= List of state routes in Washington =

State Routes in Washington
- Highway markers for State Route 4, State Route 27, and State Route 520

- The state highway system of Washington

System information
- Length: 7,054.96 mi (11,353.86 km)
- Formed: 1964
- Notes: Maintained by WSDOT

Highway names
- Interstates: Interstate X (I-X)
- US Highways: U.S. Route X (US X)
- State: State Route nn (SR nn)
- Spur Routes: State Route nn Spur (SR nn Spur)

System links
- State highways in Washington; Interstate; US; State; Scenic; Pre-1964; 1964 renumbering; Former

The U.S. state of Washington has over 7,000 miles (11,000 km) of state highways maintained by the Washington State Department of Transportation (WSDOT). The highway system is defined through acts by the state legislature and is encoded in the Revised Code of Washington as State Routes (SR). It was created in 1964 to replace an earlier numbering scheme and ratified by the state legislature in 1970. The system's 196 highways are almost entirely paved, with the exception of a gravel section on SR 165.

The state's Interstate and U.S. Highways are also defined as part of the state route system, but are omitted from this list.

== State routes ==
Number	Length (mi)	Length (km)	Southern or western terminus	Northern or eastern terminus	Formed	Removed	Notes
SR 3	59.81	96.25	US 101 in Shelton	SR 104 near Port Gamble	1964	current	
SR 4	62.27	100.21	US 101 at Johnston's Landing	I-5 in Kelso	1964	current	
SR 6	51.37	82.67	US 101 in Raymond	I-5 in Chehalis	1964	current	
SR 7	58.26	93.76	US 12 in Morton	I-5/I-705 in Tacoma	1964	current	
SR 8	20.67	33.27	US 12 in Elma	US 101 near Olympia	1967	current	
SR 8	—	—	US 410 in Elma	I-5 at Grand Mound	1964	1967	Replaced by US 12, number re-assigned to former US 410
SR 9	97.35	156.67	SR 522 near Woodinville	BC 11 in Sumas	1964	current	
SR 10	16.16	26.01	SR 970 in Teanaway	US 97 near Ellensburg	1970	current	
SR 11	21.30	34.28	I-5 in Burlington	I-5 in Bellingham	1964	current	
SR 12	—	—	US 97/US 830 near Maryhill	US 410 near Kennewick	1964	1967	Replaced by SR 14, number reassigned to US 12
SR 14	180.66	290.74	I-5 in Vancouver	I-82/US 395 near Plymouth	1968	current	
SR 14	—	—	I-5 near Napavine	US 410 in Naches	1964	1967	Replaced by US 12
SR 16	27.16	43.71	SR 3 in Gorst	I-5 in Tacoma	1964	current	Signed east–west
SR 17	136.67	219.95	US 395 in Mesa	US 97 near Brewster	1964	current	
SR 18	28.41	45.72	SR 99 in Federal Way	I-90 near North Bend	1964	current	
SR 19	14.09	22.68	SR 104 near Port Ludlow	SR 20 near Port Townsend	1992	current	
SR 20	436.13	701.88	US 101 at Discovery Bay	US 2 in Newport	1964	current	Longest state highway in Washington
SR 21	191.29	307.85	SR 260 in Kahlotus	BC Hwy 41 at Canada–US border in Danville	1964	current	
SR 22	35.84	57.68	I-82/US 12 near Zillah	I-82/US 12 in Prosser	1964	current	
SR 23	66.00	106.22	US 195 near Steptoe	SR 28 in Harrington	1964	current	
SR 24	79.23	127.51	I-82/US 12/US 97 in Yakima	SR 26 in Othello	1964	current	
SR 25	121.17	195.00	US 2 in Davenport	BC Hwy 22 at Canada–US border	1964	current	
SR 26	133.61	215.02	I-90 near Vantage	US 195 in Colfax	1964	current	
SR 27	90.00	144.84	US 195 near Pullman	SR 290 in Spokane Valley	1964	current	
SR 28	135.25	217.66	US 2/US 97 in East Wenatchee	US 2 in Davenport	1964	current	
SR 30	—	—	US 97 in Tonasket	US 395 near Kettle Falls	1964	1973	Replaced by SR 20
SR 31	26.79	43.11	SR 20 in Tiger	BC Hwy 6 at Canada–US border	1964	current	
SR 35	—	—	OR 35 at Hood River	SR 14 in White Salmon	proposed	—	
SR 41	0.41	0.66	ID 41 in Oldtown	US 2 in Newport	1997	current	
SR 92	9.16	14.74	SR 9 in Lake Stevens	Mountain Loop Highway in Granite Falls	1964	current	
SR 96	6.75	10.86	I-5 in Everett	SR 9 near Cathcart	1992	current	
SR 99	49.13	79.07	I-5 in Fife	I-5/SR 526/SR 527 in Everett	1964	current	
SR 100	4.68	7.53	US 101 in Ilwaco	SR 100 in Ilwaco	1992	current	
SR 102	2.86	4.60	Washington Corrections Center	US 101 near Shelton	1984	current	
SR 103	19.97	32.14	US 101 in Seaview	Leadbetter Point State Park	1964	current	
SR 104	31.75	51.10	US 101 near Discovery Bay	SR 522 in Lake Forest Park	1964	current	
SR 105	48.57	78.17	US 101 in Raymond	US 101 in Aberdeen	1964	current	
SR 106	20.09	32.33	US 101 in Skokomish	SR 3 near Belfair	1964	current	
SR 107	7.93	12.76	US 101 near Cosmopolis	US 12 in Montesano	1964	current	
SR 108	11.96	19.25	SR 8 in McCleary	US 101 in Kamilche	1964	current	
SR 109	40.50	65.18	US 101 in Hoquiam	Quinault Street in Taholah	1964	current	
SR 110	11.10	17.86	Olympic National Park near La Push	US 101 in Forks	1992	current	
SR 110	—	—	SR 11 in Bellingham	I-5 in Bellingham	1967	1975	Replaced by SR 11
SR 111	—	—	Hurricane Ridge in Olympic National Park	US 101 in Port Angeles	1964	1971	
SR 112	61.31	98.67	Makah Indian Reservation near Neah Bay	US 101 near Port Angeles	1964	current	
SR 113	9.98	16.06	US 101 in Sappho	SR 112 near Clallam Bay	1992	current	
SR 113	—	—	US 101 at Discovery Bay	SR 525 near Coupeville	1964	1973	Replaced by SR 20
SR 115	2.28	3.67	Point Brown Avenue in Ocean Shores	SR 109	1973	current	
SR 116	9.83	15.82	SR 19 in Irondale	Fort Flagler State Park	1992	current	
SR 117	1.40	2.25	US 101 in Port Angeles	Marine Drive in Port Angeles	1992	current	
SR 119	10.93	17.59	US 101 in Hoodsport	FH 24 near Lake Cushman	1992	current	
SR 120	—	—	US 830 in Washougal	US 830 in Prindle	1964	1967	Replaced by SR 140
SR 121	7.67	12.34	I-5 near Maytown	I-5 near Tumwater	1967	current	
SR 121	—	—	US 830 in Bingen	FR 24 near Trout Lake	1964	1967	Replaced by SR 141
SR 122	7.88	12.68	US 12 in Silver Creek	US 12 in Mossyrock	1992	current	
SR 122	—	—	US 830 in Lyle	US 97 in Goldendale	1964	1967	Replaced by SR 142
SR 123	16.36	26.33	US 12 near Packwood	SR 410 near Mount Rainier	1967	current	
SR 124	44.72	71.97	US 12 in Burbank	US 12 in Waitsburg	1964	current	
SR 125	23.65	38.06	OR 11 near Walla Walla	SR 124 near Prescott	1964	current	
SR 126	—	—	US 12 near Dayton	US 12 near Pomeroy	1964	1992	
SR 127	27.05	43.53	US 12 near Pomeroy	SR 26 at Dusty	1970	current	
SR 128	2.24	3.60	US 12 in Clarkston	ID 128 near Clarkston	1964	current	
SR 129	42.55	68.48	OR 3 near Anatone	US 12 in Clarkston	1964	current	
SR 131	2.07	3.33	FR 25 near Randle	US 12 in Randle	1992	current	
SR 131	—	—	US 10/US 97 near Ellensburg	US 97 near Virden	1964	1975	Replaced by US 97
SR 140	—	—	SR 14 in Washougal	SR 14 in Prindle	1968	1992	
SR 141	29.25	47.07	SR 14 in Bingen	FR 24 near Trout Lake	1968	current	
SR 141	—	—	SR 14 near Riffe	SR 7 in Morton	1964	1967	
SR 142	35.24	56.71	SR 14 in Lyle	US 97 in Goldendale	1968	current	
SR 143	—	—	SR 14 near Packwood	US 410 at Cayuse Pass	1964	1967	Replaced by SR 123
SR 143	—	—	SR 14 in Plymouth	Umatilla Bridge	1973	1985	Replaced by I-82
SR 150	11.76	18.93	Wapato Point Parkway in Manson	US 97 near Chelan Falls	1964	current	
SR 151	—	—	US 2 in Orondo	US 97 near Chelan	1964	1987	Replaced by US 97
SR 153	30.78	49.54	US 97 near Pateros	SR 20 near Twisp	1964	current	
SR 155	78.35	126.09	US 2 near Coulee City	US 97/SR 20 in Omak	1964	current	
SR 160	7.47	12.02	SR 16 in Port Orchard	Fauntleroy ferry terminal in Seattle	1964	current	
SR 161	36.25	58.34	SR 7 near Eatonville	SR 18 in Federal Way	1964	current	
SR 162	17.37	27.95	SR 410 in Sumner	SR 165 near Buckley	1964	current	
SR 163	3.37	5.42	SR 16 in Tacoma	Tahlequah ferry terminal in Vashon	1991	current	
SR 163	—	—	US 410 in Sumner	SR 167 in Auburn	1964	1969	Replaced by SR 167
SR 164	14.82	23.85	SR 18 in Auburn	SR 410 in Enumclaw	1969	current	
SR 165	21.18	34.09	Mowich Lake Road near Mowich Lake	SR 410 in Buckley	1964	current	
SR 166	5.13	8.26	SR 16 near Port Orchard	Whitter Avenue in Port Orchard	1993	current	
SR 167	28.60	46.03	I-5 in Tacoma	SR 900 in Renton	1964	current	
SR 168	—	—	SR 410 near Greenwater	SR 410 near Cliffdell	proposed	—	
SR 169	25.26	40.65	SR 164 in Enumclaw	SR 900 in Renton	1964	current	
SR 170	3.66	5.89	SR 17 near Warden	South Main Street in Warden	1970	current	
SR 170	—	—	Ringold River Road near Basin City	SR 17 near Mesa	1965	1967	
SR 171	3.79	6.10	I-90 in Moses Lake	SR 17 in Moses Lake	1964	current	
SR 172	35.01	56.34	US 2 at Farmer	SR 17 near Mansfield	1964	current	
SR 173	11.86	19.09	SR 17 in Bridgeport	US 97 in Brewster	1964	current	
SR 174	40.66	65.44	SR 17 in Leahy	SR 21 near Wilbur	1964	current	
SR 181	6.05	9.74	SR 516 in Kent	I-405 in Tukwila	1964	current	
SR 193	2.58	4.15	SR 128 near Clarkston	Wawawai Road near Clarkston	1964	current	
SR 194	21.01	33.81	Almota Road in Almota	US 195 near Pullman	1991	current	
SR 202	30.58	49.21	SR 522 in Woodinville	I-90 in North Bend	1970	current	
SR 202	—	—	SR 522 near Bothell	US 2 in Monroe	1964	1970	Replaced by SR 522
SR 203	24.26	39.04	SR 202 in Fall City	US 2 in Monroe	1970	current	
SR 204	2.38	3.83	US 2 near Everett	SR 9 in Lake Stevens	1964	current	
SR 206	15.30	24.62	US 2 near Mead	Mount Spokane State Park	1964	current	
SR 207	4.38	7.05	US 2 at Coles Corner	Lake Wenatchee State Park	1964	current	
SR 209	—	—	US 2 near Leavenworth	Lake Wenatchee State Park	1964	1992	
SR 211	15.18	24.43	US 2 near Diamond Lake	SR 20 in Usk	1975	current	
SR 213	0.35	0.56	US 97 near Malott	First Avenue in Malott	2008	current	
SR 215	6.24	10.04	SR 20 in Okanogan	US 97/SR 20 in Omak	1973	current	
SR 220	27.42	44.13	Fort Simcoe State Park	SR 22 in Toppenish	1964	1992	
SR 221	25.95	41.76	SR 14 in Paterson	SR 22 in Prosser	1964	current	
SR 223	3.80	6.12	SR 22 near Toppenish	I-82/US 12 in Granger	1967	current	
SR 224	10.15	16.33	I-82/US 12 in Benton City	SR 240 in Richland	1965	current	
SR 225	11.33	18.23	SR 224 in Kiona	SR 240 at Horn Rapids Dam	1991	current	
SR 230	—	—	I-90/US 395 in Ritzville	SR 23 in Ewan	proposed	—	
SR 231	74.97	120.65	SR 23 near Sprague	US 395 near Chewelah	1964	current	
SR 232	—	—	SR 231 near Valley	US 395 near Valley	1967	1991	
SR 237	—	—	SR 20 in Fredonia	SR 11 near Edison	1975	1991	
SR 240	41.31	66.48	SR 24 near Hanford Reservation	US 395 in Kennewick	1964	current	
SR 241	25.18	40.52	SR 22 in Mabton	SR 24 near Hanford Reservation	1967	current	
SR 243	28.23	45.43	SR 24 near Desert Aire	SR 26 near Vantage	1964	current	
SR 251	—	—	SR 25 in Northport	BC Hwy 22A at the Canada–US border	1964	1983	
SR 260	37.98	61.12	SR 17 near Connell	SR 26/SR 261 in Washtucna	1964	current	
SR 261	62.71	100.92	US 12 near Starbuck	I-90/US 395 in Ritzville	1964	current	
SR 262	24.22	38.98	SR 26 near Othello	SR 17 near Warden	1991	current	
SR 263	9.24	14.87	Port of Windust	SR 260 in Kahlotus	1991	current	
SR 270	9.89	15.92	US 195 in Pullman	ID 8 near Moscow	1964	current	
SR 271	8.48	13.65	SR 27 near Oakesdale	US 195 in Rosalia	1964	current	
SR 272	19.22	30.93	US 195 in Colfax	ID 6 near Palouse	1964	current	
SR 274	1.92	3.09	SR 27 in Tekoa	ID 60 near Tekoa	1964	current	
SR 276	—	—	US 195 near Pullman	SR 270 near Pullman	1973	2016	Never built
SR 278	5.50	8.85	SR 27 in Rockford	ID 58 near Rockford	1991	current	
SR 281	10.55	16.98	I-90 near George	SR 28 in Quincy	1964	current	
SR 282	4.92	7.92	SR 28 in Ephrata	SR 17 near Ephrata	1964	current	
SR 283	14.86	23.91	SR 281 Spur near George	SR 28 near Ephrata	1964	current	
SR 285	5.04	8.11	SR 28 in East Wenatchee	US 2/US 97 in Sunnyslope	1977	current	
SR 290	18.31	29.47	I-90 in Spokane	ID 53 at State Line	1964	current	
SR 291	33.09	53.25	US 2/US 395 in Spokane	SR 231 near Ford	1964	current	
SR 292	5.91	9.51	SR 231 in Springdale	US 395 in Loon Lake	1964	current	
SR 294	—	—	US 395 in Colville	SR 31 in Tiger	1964	1973	Replaced by SR 20
SR 300	3.35	5.39	Belfair State Park	SR 3 in Belfair	1964	current	
SR 302	16.87	27.15	SR 3 in Allyn	SR 16 in Gig Harbor	1964	current	
SR 303	9.27	14.92	SR 304 in Bremerton	SR 3 in Silverdale	1964	current	
SR 304	3.14	5.05	SR 3 in Navy Yard City	Colman Dock ferry terminal in Seattle	1964	current	Deleted between 1991 and 1994
SR 305	13.50	21.73	Colman Dock ferry terminal in Seattle	SR 3 in Poulsbo	1964	current	
SR 306	—	—	SR 303 in Bremerton	Illahee State Park	1964	1993	
SR 307	5.25	8.45	SR 305 in Poulsbo	SR 104 near Kingston	1991	current	
SR 308	3.42	5.50	SR 3 in Bangor	Naval Undersea Warfare Center in Keyport	1971	current	
SR 310	1.84	2.96	SR 3 in Bremerton	SR 304 in Bremerton	1991	current	
SR 311	—	—	US 2 near Diamond Lake	SR 20 in Usk	1964	1975	Replaced by SR 211
SR 339	9.8	15.8	Vashon ferry terminal	Colman Dock ferry terminal in Seattle	1994	current	Passenger-only ferry route
SR 397	22.31	35.90	I-82/US 395 near Finley	I-182/US 12/US 395 in Pasco	1992	current	
SR 401	12.13	19.52	US 101 in Megler	SR 4 in Naselle	1964	current	
SR 402	—	—	SR 4 in Grays River	SR 6 near Pe Ell	1964	1971	Never built proposal
SR 403	—	—	Altoona	SR 4 in Rosburg	1964	1992	
SR 407	—	—	SR 4 in Cathlamet	Elochoman State Forest	1964	1992	
SR 409	3.84	6.18	Wahkiakum County ferry terminal on Puget Island	SR 4 in Cathlamet	1964	current	
SR 410	107.44	172.91	SR 167 in Sumner	US 12 in Naches	1967	current	
SR 411	13.48	21.69	SR 432 in Longview	I-5/SR 504 in Castle Rock	1964	current	
SR 431	—	—	SR 4 in Kelso	I-5 in Kelso	1968	1992	
SR 432	10.32	16.61	SR 4 in West Longview	I-5 in Kelso	1968	current	
SR 433	0.94	1.51	Lewis and Clark Bridge	SR 432 in Longview	1968	current	
SR 500	22.64	36.44	I-5 in Vancouver	SR 14 in Camas	1964	current	
SR 501	12.70	20.44	I-5 in Vancouver	I-5 in Ridgefield	1964	current	Divided into two sections
SR 502	6.12	9.85	I-5 near Mount Vista	SR 503 in Battle Ground	1964	current	
SR 503	54.11	87.08	SR 500 in Orchards	I-5 in Woodland	1964	current	
SR 504	51.76	83.30	I-5/SR 411 in Castle Rock	Mount St. Helens National Volcanic Monument	1964	current	
SR 505	19.29	31.04	Kerron Street in Winlock	SR 504 near Toutle	1964	current	
SR 506	11.53	18.56	2nd Street in Ryderwood	I-5 near Toledo	1964	current	
SR 507	43.88	70.62	I-5/US 12 in Centralia	SR 7 in Spanaway	1964	current	
SR 508	32.84	52.85	I-5/US 12 in Napavine	SR 7 in Morton	1964	current	
SR 509	35.17	56.60	I-705 in Tacoma	SR 99 in Seattle	1964	current	
SR 510	13.10	21.08	SR 507 in Yelm	I-5 in Lacey	1964	current	
SR 512	12.06	19.41	I-5 in Lakewood	SR 161/SR 167 in Puyallup	1964	current	
SR 513	3.35	5.39	SR 520 in Seattle	Magnuson Park in Seattle	1964	current	
SR 514	—	—	I-5 in Fife	SR 161 in Edgewood	1964	1992	
SR 515	7.86	12.65	SR 516 in Kent	SR 900 in Renton	1964	current	
SR 516	16.49	26.54	SR 509 in Des Moines	SR 169 in Maple Valley	1964	current	
SR 518	3.42	5.50	SR 509 in Burien	I-5/I-405 in Tukwila	1964	current	
SR 519	1.14	1.83	I-90 in Seattle	Colman Dock ferry terminal in Seattle	1991	current	
SR 520	12.82	20.63	I-5 in Seattle	SR 202 in Redmond	1964	current	
SR 522	24.64	39.65	I-5 in Seattle	US 2 in Monroe	1964	current	
SR 523	2.45	3.94	SR 99 in Seattle/Shoreline	SR 522 in Lake Forest Park/Shoreline	1991	current	
SR 524	14.68	23.63	SR 104 in Edmonds	SR 522 in Maltby	1964	current	
SR 525	30.68	49.37	I-5/I-405 in Lynnwood	SR 20 near Coupeville	1964	current	
SR 526	4.52	7.27	SR 525 in Mukilteo	I-5/SR 99/SR 527 in Everett	1964	current	
SR 527	9.29	14.95	I-405 in Bothell	I-5/SR 99/SR 526 in Everett	1964	current	
SR 528	3.46	5.57	I-5 in Marysville	SR 9 in Marysville	1964	current	
SR 529	7.88	12.68	I-5 in Everett	SR 528 in Marysville	1971	current	
SR 530	50.45	81.19	I-5 near Arlington	SR 20 in Rockport	1964	current	
SR 531	9.88	15.90	Wenberg County Park near Lake Goodwin	SR 9 in Arlington	1991	current	
SR 532	10.09	16.24	Sunrise Boulevard on Camano Island	I-5 near Stanwood	1964	current	
SR 534	5.08	8.18	I-5 in Conway	SR 9 in Lake McMurray	1964	current	
SR 536	5.38	8.66	SR 20 near Mount Vernon	I-5 in Mount Vernon	1964	current	
SR 537	—	—	SR 536 in Fredonia	SR 11 near Edison	1964	1975	Replaced by SR 237
SR 538	3.61	5.81	I-5 in Mount Vernon	SR 9 near Big Lake	1964	current	
SR 539	15.18	24.43	I-5 in Bellingham	BC Hwy 13 at Canada–US border near Lynden	1964	current	
SR 540	—	—	Lummi Indian Reservation	I-5 in Ferndale	1964	1984	
SR 542	57.29	92.20	I-5 in Bellingham	Mount Baker Ski Area	1964	current	
SR 543	1.09	1.75	I-5 in Blaine	BC Hwy 15 at Canada–US border in Blaine	1964	current	
SR 544	8.94	14.39	SR 539 near Lynden	SR 9 in Nooksack	1964	current	
SR 546	8.02	12.91	SR 539 near Lynden	SR 9 near Sumas	1964	current	
SR 547	10.72	17.25	SR 542 in Kendall	SR 9 in Sumas	1984	current	
SR 548	13.85	22.29	I-5 near Ferndale	I-5 in Blaine	1991	current	
SR 599	1.75	2.82	I-5 in Tukwila	SR 99 in Tukwila	1971	current	
SR 603	—	—	I-5 near Winlock	SR 6 near Chehalis	1964	1992	Replaced by SR 505
SR 702	9.32	15.00	SR 507 in McKenna	SR 7 near Eatonville	1964	current	
SR 704	0.63	1.01	Spanaway Loop Road in Spanaway	SR 7 in Spanaway	2002	current	
SR 706	13.64	21.95	SR 7 in Elbe	Longmire in Mount Rainier National Park	1964	current	
SR 801	—	—	SR 8 in Rochester	I-5 in Maytown	1964	1967	Replaced by SR 121
SR 821	25.21	40.57	I-82/US 97 in Selah	I-82/US 97 near Ellensburg	1973	current	
SR 823	5.56	8.95	I-82/US 97 in Selah	SR 821 in Selah	1984	current	
SR 831	—	—	US 830 in Kelso	I-5 in Kelso	1964	1967	Replaced by SR 431
SR 832	—	—	US 830 in West Longview	I-5 in Kelso	1964	1967	Replaced by SR 432
SR 833	—	—	Lewis and Clark Bridge	SR 832 in Longview	1964	1967	Replaced by SR 433
SR 900	16.20	26.07	I-5 in Tukwila	I-90 in Issaquah	1964	current	
SR 901	—	—	I-90 in Issaquah	SR 202 in Redmond	1964	1992	
SR 902	12.36	19.89	I-90/US 395 near Medical Lake	I-90/US 395 near Medical Lake	1964	current	
SR 903	10.06	16.19	SR 970 near Cle Elum	Wenatchee National Forest near Lake Cle Elum	1964	current	
SR 904	16.96	27.29	I-90/US 395 in Tyler	I-90/US 395 in Four Lakes	1964	current	
SR 906	2.65	4.26	I-90 at Snoqualmie Pass	I-90 in Hyak	1967	current	
SR 908	—	—	I-405 in Kirkland	SR 202 in Redmond	1971	2010	
SR 920	—	—	SR 901 in Redmond	SR 202 in Redmond	1975	1985	Replaced by SR 520
SR 970	10.31	16.59	I-90 in Cle Elum	US 97 in Virden	1975	current	
SR 971	15.02	24.17	US 97 Alt near Entiat	US 97 Alt near Chelan	1991	current	
Former; Proposed and unbuilt

== Special routes ==
WSDOT does not maintain business routes, which are instead created and signed by local jurisdictions.

Number	Length (mi)	Length (km)	Southern or western terminus	Northern or eastern terminus	Formed	Removed	Notes
SR 9 Spur	0.24	0.39	SR 9 in Sumas	Canada–US border in Sumas	—	—	
SR 14 Spur	0.39	0.63	SR 14 in Maryhill	US 97 in Maryhill	—	—	
SR 14 Bus.	—	—	SR 14 in Camas	SR 14 near Washougal	—	—	
SR 16 Alt.	0.68	1.09	Serves Tacoma Narrows Bridge toll plaza		2007	current	
SR 16 Spur	0.39	0.63	SR 16 in Gorst	SR 3 in Gorst	1988	current	
SR 20 Spur	7.78	12.52	SR 20 near Anacortes	San Juan Islands ferry	—	—	
SR 20 Bus.	—	—	—	—	1964	1973	Replaced by SR 215
SR 26 Spur	0.07	0.11	SR 26 in Colfax	US 195 in Colfax	—	—	
SR 28 Spur	0.76	1.22	SR 285 in East Wenatchee	SR 28 in East Wenatchee	—	—	
SR 92 Spur	0.08	0.13	SR 92 in Granite Falls	Granite Falls	—	—	
SR 100 Spur	0.08	0.13	SR 100 near Fort Canby	Cape Disappointment State Park	1991	current	
SR 104 Spur	0.34	0.55	SR 99 in Edmonds/Shoreline	SR 104 in Edmonds/Shoreline	—	—	
SR 105 Spur	0.15	0.24	SR 105 in Aberdeen	US 101 in Aberdeen	—	—	
SR 105 Spur	4.02	6.47	SR 105 at Twin Harbors State Park	Westhaven Drive in Westport	—	—	
SR 108 Bus.	—	—	SR 108 near McCleary	SR 108 in McCleary	—	—	
SR 109 Spur	1.82	2.93	SR 109 in Hoquiam	US 101 in Hoquiam	—	—	
SR 110 Spur	2.67	4.30	Olympic National Park boundary near Mora	SR 110 near Mora	—	—	
SR 125 Spur	0.73	1.17	US 12 in Walla Walla	SR 125 in Walla Walla	—	—	
SR 129 Spur	0.25	0.40	SR 129 in Clarkston	US 12 in Clarkston	—	—	
SR 141 Spur	2.16	3.48	SR 14 in Underwood	SR 141 near White Salmon	—	—	
SR 151 Spur	—	—	SR 151 near Chelan	US 97 near Chelan	1964	1987	Replaced by US 97
SR 155 Spur	0.37	0.60	SR 215 in Omak	SR 155 in Omak	—	—	
SR 174 Spur	1.37	2.20	SR 174 near Grand Coulee	Crown Point Vista at Steamboat Rock State Park	1964	current	
SR 174 Spur	0.09	0.14	SR 17 in Leahy	SR 174 in Leahy	2009	current	
SR 240 Bus.	—	—	I-182/US 12/SR 240 in Richland	SR 240 in Richland	—	—	
SR 281 Spur	1.69	2.72	I-90/SR 283 near George	SR 281 near George	—	—	
SR 302 Spur	1.28	2.06	SR 302 in Purdy	SR 16 near Purdy	—	—	
SR 503 Spur	8.42	13.55	SR 503 near Yale	Swift Reservoir in Skamania County	—	—	
SR 504 Spur	0.87	1.40	SR 504 near Kid Valley	Toutle River Sediment Retention Structure	—	—	
SR 510 Spur	1.17	1.88	SR 510 in Yelm	Cullens Road in Yelm	2010	current	
SR 524 Spur	0.70	1.13	SR 104 in Edmonds	SR 524 in Edmonds	—	—	
SR 524 Spur	0.50	0.80	I-5 in Lynnwood	SR 524 in Lynnwood	—	—	
SR 525 Spur	0.86	1.38	SR 525 in Mukilteo	SR 526 in Mukilteo	2001	current	
SR 529 Spur	0.20	0.32	SR 529 in Everett	I-5 in Everett	—	—	
SR 903 Spur	0.33	0.53	SR 903 in Cle Elum	SR 970 near Cle Elum	—	—	
SR 906 Spur	0.43	0.69	SR 906 in Hyak	WSDOT Maintenance Office in Hyak	—	—	
Former
