= Lakeview, Washington =

Lakeview, Washington Lakeview Park
- Census-designated place
- Location of Lakeview, Washington
- Coordinates: 47°22′33″N 119°29′56″W
- Country: United States
- State: Washington
- County: Grant

Area
  - Total: 1.1 sq mi (2.9 km^{2})
  - Land: 1.1 sq mi (2.9 km^{2})
  - Water: 0 sq mi (0.0 km^{2})
- Elevation: 1,207 ft (368 m)

Population (2020)
  - Total: 1,068
  - Density: 950/sq mi (370/km^{2})
- Time zone: UTC-8 (Pacific (PST))
  - Summer (DST): UTC-7 (PDT)
- ZIP code: 98851
- Area code: 509
- FIPS code: 53-37926
- GNIS feature ID: 2408565

Lakeview is a census-designated place (CDP) in Grant County, Washington, United States. As of the 2020 census, Lakeview had a population of 1,068. The community is referred to as Lakeview Park on topographic maps and by locals.

== Geography ==
Lakeview is located in northern Grant County along the southern border of the city of Soap Lake. Washington State Route 28 passes through the southeast corner of the CDP, leading east 42 miles (68 km) to Odessa and southwest 5 miles (8 km) to Ephrata.

According to the United States Census Bureau, the Lakeview CDP has a total area of 1.1 square miles (2.9 km^{2}), all of it land.

== Demographics ==
Historical population
Census	Pop.	Note	%±
2000	797		—
2010	915		14.8%
2020	1,068		16.7%
U.S. Decennial Census; 1990 2000 2010

Lakeview first appeared as a census designated place in the 2000 U.S. census.

=== Racial and ethnic composition ===
Lakeview CDP, Washington – Racial and ethnic composition Note: the US Census treats Hispanic/Latino as an ethnic category. This table excludes Latinos from the racial categories and assigns them to a separate category. Hispanics/Latinos may be of any race.
Race / Ethnicity (NH = Non-Hispanic)	Pop 2000	Pop 2010	Pop 2020	% 2000	% 2010	% 2020
White alone (NH)	692	757	749	86.83%	82.73%	70.13%
Black or African American alone (NH)	8	4	0	1.00%	0.44%	0.00%
Native American or Alaska Native alone (NH)	13	6	7	1.63%	0.66%	0.66%
Asian alone (NH)	1	2	5	0.13%	0.22%	0.47%
Native Hawaiian or Pacific Islander alone (NH)	0	1	0	0.00%	0.11%	0.00%
Other race alone (NH)	1	1	0	0.13%	0.11%	0.00%
Mixed race or Multiracial (NH)	15	18	33	1.88%	1.97%	3.09%
Hispanic or Latino (any race)	67	126	274	8.41%	13.77%	25.66%
Total	797	915	1,068	100.00%	100.00%	100.00%

=== 2000 census ===
As of the census of 2000, there were 797 people, 336 households, and 233 families residing in the CDP. The population density was 700.1 people per square mile (269.9/km^{2}). There were 372 housing units at an average density of 326.8/sq mi (126.0/km^{2}). The racial makeup of the CDP was 89.46% White, 1.00% African American, 2.13% Native American, 0.25% Asian, 4.14% from other races, and 3.01% from two or more races. Hispanic or Latino of any race were 8.41% of the population.

There were 336 households, out of which 22.6% had children under the age of 18 living with them, 56.8% were married couples living together, 9.5% had a female householder with no husband present, and 30.4% were non-families. 26.2% of all households were made up of individuals, and 14.6% had someone living alone who was 65 years of age or older. The average household size was 2.37 and the average family size was 2.79.

In the CDP, the population was spread out, with 24.0% under the age of 18, 5.0% from 18 to 24, 18.9% from 25 to 44, 27.9% from 45 to 64, and 24.2% who were 65 years of age or older. The median age was 48 years. For every 100 females, there were 90.2 males. For every 100 females age 18 and over, there were 94.2 males.

The median income for a household in the CDP was $30,588, and the median income for a family was $35,313. Males had a median income of $31,607 versus $21,563 for females. The per capita income for the CDP was $17,448. About 13.4% of families and 18.6% of the population were below the poverty line, including 49.6% of those under age 18 and 2.6% of those age 65 or over.

== Education ==
The area is served by the Soap Lake School District.
