= Wilson Creek, Washington =

Wilson Creek
- Town
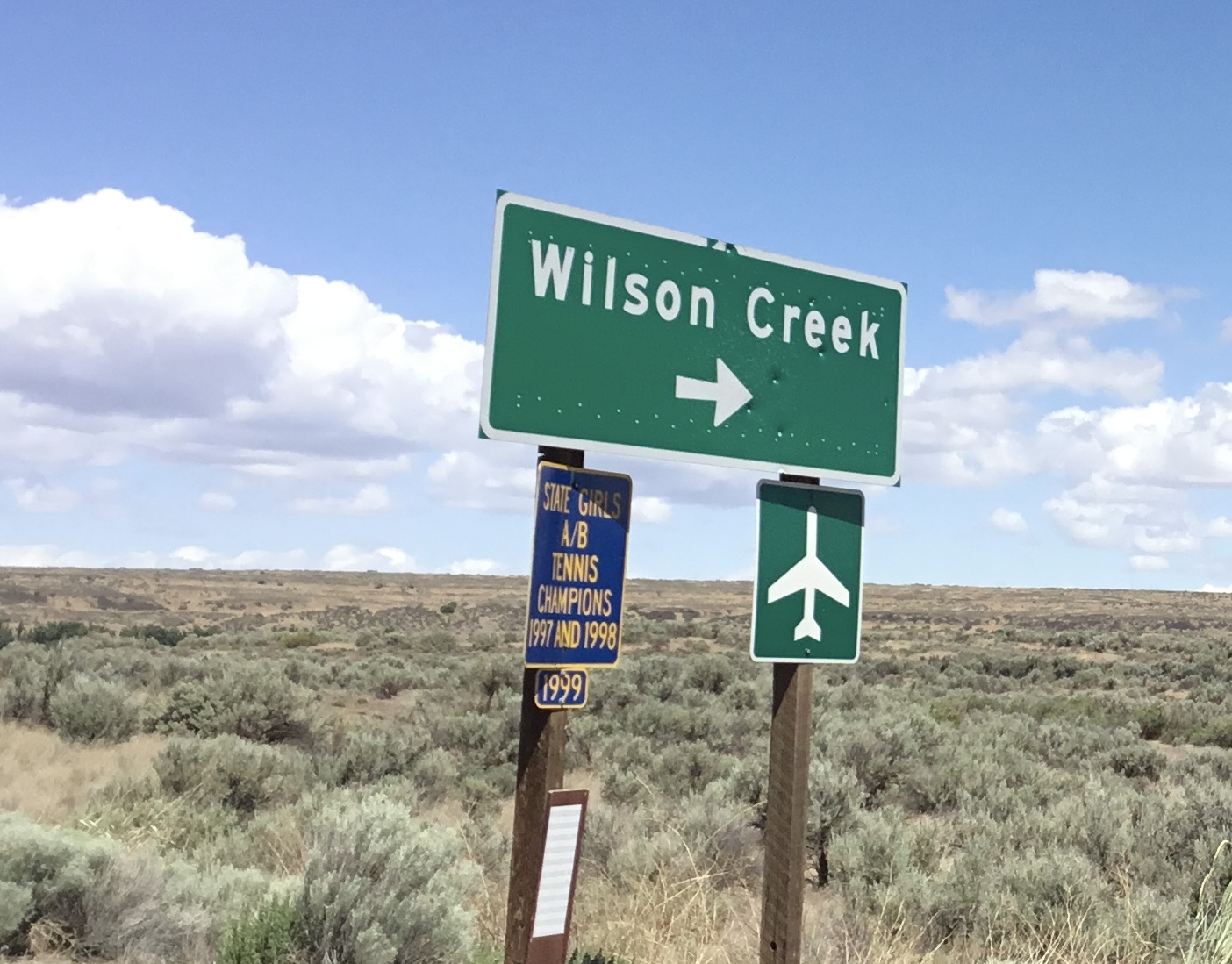
- Sign leading into Wilson Creek off of Washington State Route 28

- Location of Wilson Creek, Washington
- Coordinates: 47°25′28″N 119°07′20″W
- Country: United States
- State: Washington
- County: Grant

Government
  - Type: Mayor–council
  - Mayor: Robert Herron

Area
  - Total: 0.97 sq mi (2.50 km^{2})
  - Land: 0.97 sq mi (2.50 km^{2})
  - Water: 0 sq mi (0.00 km^{2})
- Elevation: 1,283 ft (391 m)

Population (2020)
  - Total: 204
  - Density: 222.7/sq mi (85.97/km^{2})
- Time zone: UTC-8 (Pacific (PST))
  - Summer (DST): UTC-7 (PDT)
- ZIP code: 98860
- Area code: 509
- FIPS code: 53-79135
- GNIS feature ID: 2413492
- Website: wilsoncreekwa.com

Wilson Creek is a town in Grant County, Washington, United States. The population was 204 at the 2020 census.

== History ==
The area around Crab and Wilson creeks were inhabited by Native American peoples until the arrival of settlers in the late 19th century. The town was originally known as "Nanum Creek" and was renamed after one of the first pioneers to the area, who settled there in 1886. John Marlin and the Urquhart Brothers established their homes in the area in 1870s and were followed by a military road connecting Fort Walla Walla to Camp Chelan that passed near the area. A railroad was built through the area in 1892. Wilson Creek was platted in 1903 and officially incorporated on May 8, 1903.

When Grant County was created in 1909, Wilson Creek was its largest town with around 600 people. The town grew little, however, and by the mid-20th century had been surpassed by Ephrata and Quincy. Despite the slowing of growth, Wilson Creek established a port district in March 1960. The Port of Wilson Creek is home to an airport, which was renovated in 1984 and again in the 2000s when updates were made to the 3,074-foot (937 m) runway.

== Geography ==
Wilson Creek is located alongside a creek of the same name. Crab Creek, into which the aforementioned creek flows, runs along the southern side of the town. Just west of town along Crab Creek are Billy Clapp Lake and the Pinto Dam, both of which are part of the extensive Columbia Basin Project. State Route 28 passes immediately south of the town site as it follows the valley of Crab Creek, connecting Wilson Creek to Soap Lake to the west and Odessa to the east.

According to the United States Census Bureau, the town has a total area of 0.96 square miles (2.49 km^{2}), all of it land.

=== Climate ===
According to the Köppen Climate Classification system, Wilson Creek has a semi-arid climate, abbreviated "BSk" on climate maps.

== Demographics ==
Historical population
Census	Pop.	Note	%±
1910	405		—
1920	300		−25.9%
1930	216		−28.0%
1940	210		−2.8%
1950	337		60.5%
1960	252		−25.2%
1970	184		−27.0%
1980	222		20.7%
1990	148		−33.3%
2000	227		53.4%
2010	205		−9.7%
2020	204		−0.5%
U.S. Decennial Census; 2020 Census

=== 2010 census ===
As of the 2010 census, there were 205 people, 94 households, and 56 families residing in the town. The population density was 213.5 inhabitants per square mile (82.4/km^{2}). There were 116 housing units at an average density of 120.8 per square mile (46.6/km^{2}). The racial makeup of the town was 91.2% White, 1.5% Native American, 1.0% Asian, 2.4% from other races, and 3.9% from two or more races. Hispanic or Latino of any race were 8.3% of the population.

There were 94 households, of which 24.5% had children under the age of 18 living with them, 42.6% were married couples living together, 9.6% had a female householder with no husband present, 7.4% had a male householder with no wife present, and 40.4% were non-families. 35.1% of all households were made up of individuals, and 21.3% had someone living alone who was 65 years of age or older. The average household size was 2.18 and the average family size was 2.77.

The median age in the town was 50.8 years. 20% of residents were under the age of 18; 7.3% were between the ages of 18 and 24; 14.7% were from 25 to 44; 28.2% were from 45 to 64; and 29.8% were 65 years of age or older. The gender makeup of the town was 47.3% male and 52.7% female.

=== 2000 census ===
As of the 2000 census, there were 227 people, 96 households, and 60 families residing in the town. The population density was 229.7 people per square mile (88.5/km^{2}). There were 108 housing units at an average density of 109.3 per square mile (42.1/km^{2}). The racial makeup of the town was 93.39% White, 1.32% Native American, 0.88% Asian, 0.88% from other races, and 3.52% from two or more races. Hispanic or Latino of any race were 2.64% of the population.

There were 96 households, out of which 27.1% had children under the age of 18 living with them, 53.1% were married couples living together, 5.2% had a female householder with no husband present, and 37.5% were non-families. 29.2% of all households were made up of individuals, and 14.6% had someone living alone who was 65 years of age or older. The average household size was 2.36 and the average family size was 2.97.

In the town, the population was spread out, with 25.6% under the age of 18, 4.8% from 18 to 24, 23.8% from 25 to 44, 25.6% from 45 to 64, and 20.3% who were 65 years of age or older. The median age was 42 years. For every 100 females, there were 99.1 males. For every 100 females age 18 and over, there were 96.5 males.

The median income for a household in the town was $23,750, and the median income for a family was $24,375. Males had a median income of $31,667 versus $11,250 for females. The per capita income for the town was $11,464. About 21.6% of families and 27.4% of the population were below the poverty line, including 47.2% of those under the age of eighteen and 4.7% of those 65 or over.

== Education ==
The town is served by the Wilson Creek School District.
