= Washington State Route 283 =

State highway in Grant County, Washington, US

State Route 283

- SR 283 highlighted in red

Route information
- Auxiliary route of SR 28
- Maintained by WSDOT
- Length: 14.86 mi (23.91 km)
- Existed: 1964–present

Major junctions
- South end: SR 281 Spur near George
- North end: SR 28 near Ephrata

Location
- Country: United States
- State: Washington
- Counties: Grant

Highway system
- State highways in Washington; Interstate; US; State; Scenic; Pre-1964; 1964 renumbering; Former
← SR 282	→ SR 285

State Route 283 (SR 283) is a state highway serving rural Grant County in the U.S. state of Washington. The highway travels for 15 miles (24 km) in a northeasterly direction between George and Ephrata, traveling from SR 281 Spur at its interchange with Interstate 90 (I-90) to SR 28. SR 283 was created during the 1964 highway renumbering as the successor to a branch of Primary State Highway 7 (PSH 7), codified in 1949 and built in the 1950s.

== Route description ==
SR 283 begins at an intersection with SR 281 at its interchange with I-90 northeast of George. The two-lane highway travels due northeast through farmland in rural Grant County, passing Grigg Farm Airport and crossing over the Winchester Wasteway, before ending at an intersection with SR 28 southwest of Ephrata.

Every year, the Washington State Department of Transportation (WSDOT) conducts a series of surveys on its highways in the state to measure traffic volume. This is expressed in terms of annual average daily traffic (AADT), which is a measure of traffic volume for any average day of the year. In 2011, WSDOT calculated that between 2,100 and 2,500 vehicles per day used the highway to travel between George and Ephrata.

== History ==
SR 283 was created during the 1964 highway renumbering as the successor to the George–Ephrata branch of PSH 7. The branch, created in 1949 to connect Ephrata to U.S. Route 10 (US 10), was built and paved as a two-lane highway in the 1950s. The bridge over Winchester Wasteway was built in 1953 and replaced with a newer concrete bridge that opened in April 2006.

== Major intersections ==
The entire highway is in Grant County.

Location	mi	km	Destinations	Notes
	0.00	0.00	SR 281 Spur to I-90 – Seattle, Spokane, Quincy	Southern terminus
	14.86	23.91	SR 28 – Ephrata, Soap Lake, Quincy	Northern terminus
1.000 mi = 1.609 km; 1.000 km = 0.621 mi
