= Washington State Route 281 =

Highway in Grant County, Washington, US

State Route 281

- A map of western Grant County with SR 281 highlighted in red

Route information
- Auxiliary route of SR 28
- Maintained by WSDOT
- Length: 10.55 mi (16.98 km)
- Existed: 1964–present

Major junctions
- South end: I-90 in George
- North end: SR 28 in Quincy

Location
- Country: United States
- State: Washington
- Counties: Grant

Highway system
- State highways in Washington; Interstate; US; State; Scenic; Pre-1964; 1964 renumbering; Former
← SR 278	→ SR 282

State Route 281 (SR 281) is a short state highway in Grant County, Washington. It travels north–south for 10.5 miles (16.9 km), connecting Interstate 90 (I-90) in George to SR 28 in Quincy. The highway is a major freight corridor and also has a short spur route near George that connects it to SR 283.

SR 281 was added to the state highway system in 1915 as part of the Sunset Highway, but was transferred to the North Central Highway four years later. The highway was paved in the 1930s and designated as part of Primary State Highway 7 (PSH 7) before being replaced by SR 281 in the 1964 state highway renumbering. SR 281 has since been proposed for upgrades into a four-lane highway or a freeway due to its importance in linking the Wenatchee area to I-90.

== Route description ==
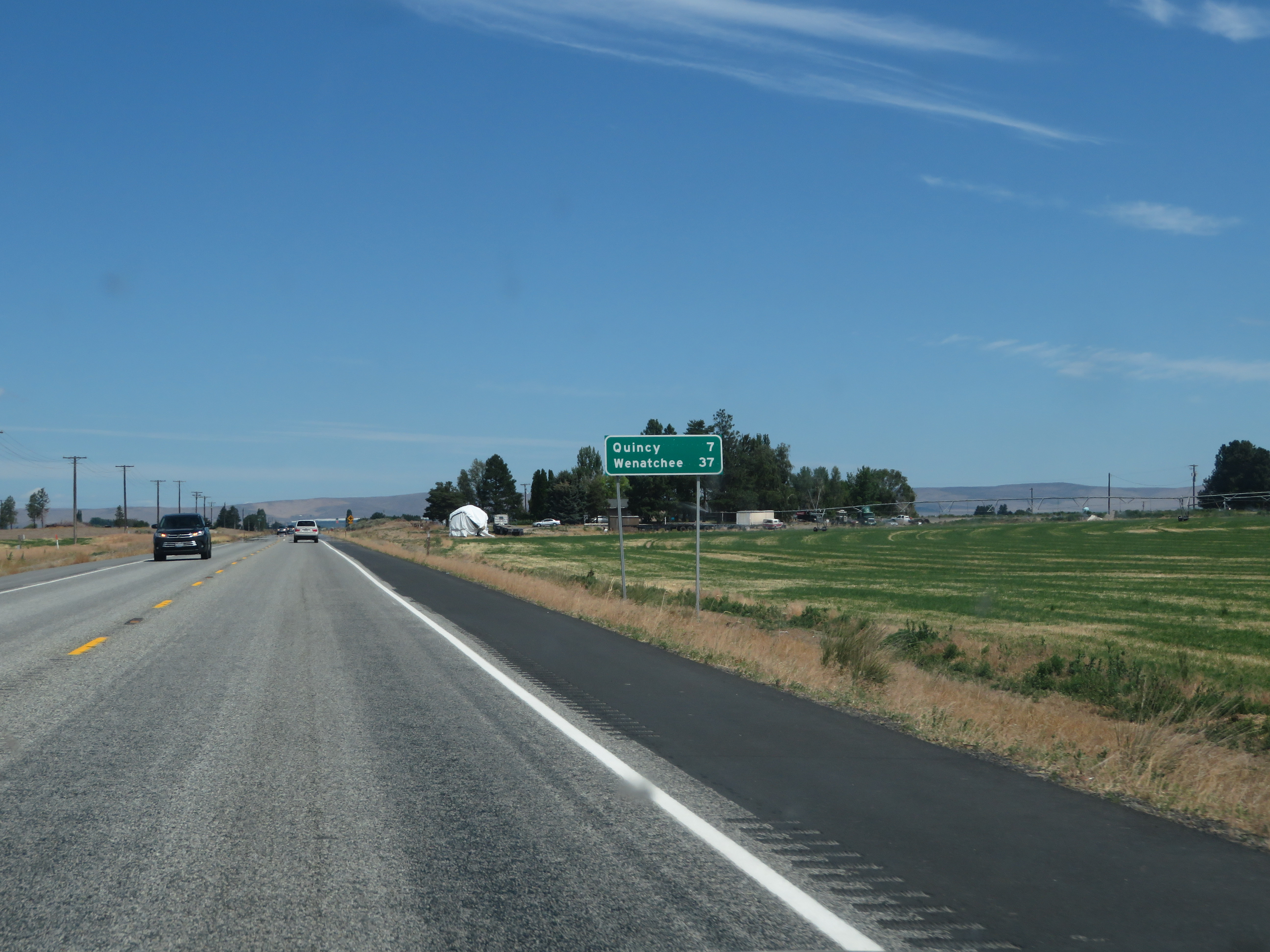
SR 281 Between Interstate 90 and Quincy

SR 281 begins at a diamond interchange on exit 149 of I-90, located on the north side of George between Vantage and Moses Lake. The two-lane highway, a continuation of Royal Anne Drive, travels northeast and crosses an irrigation canal before turning due north onto Road Q Northwest. After passing several farms and industrial businesses, SR 281 intersects Beverly Burke Road (which leads to The Gorge Amphitheatre) and is joined by its spur route, which connects it to I-90 exit 151 and SR 283. The highway continues north through farmland along an irrigation canal, passing fields of alfalfa, onions, and corn, as well as an unmanned weigh station and the Colockum Ridge Golf Course. A section of the highway has crop identification signs maintained by local organizations to inform visitors.

SR 281 approaches Quincy and passes the city's airport before crossing an irrigation canal into the city proper. The highway becomes the four-lane Central Avenue and passes through a commercial district for several blocks before terminating at an intersection with SR 28 at F Street. The corridor is served by buses from the Grant Transit Authority and Travel Washington's Apple Line. Road Q continues north from the intersection and Quincy and climbs part of the Beezley Hills, while SR 28 connects the highway to Wenatchee and Ephrata.

The highway is maintained by the Washington State Department of Transportation (WSDOT), which conducts an annual survey of traffic volume on state routes, expressed in terms of annual average daily traffic. Average vehicle counts on SR 281 measured in 2016 ranged from a minimum of 4,200 at its interchange with I-90 to a maximum of 8,800 at SR 28 in Quincy. The highway is a major freight corridor, connecting fruit-growing regions in northern Washington to I-90, and handled approximately 8 million tons (7.3 million metric tons) of cargo in 2015. The entire route of SR 281 is also listed as a Highway of Statewide Significance and is included on the National Highway System, a network of roads identified as important to the national economy, defense, and mobility.

== History ==
The road connecting Quincy to points south, including Burke and the future settlement of George, appeared on local maps as early as 1910. It was added to the state highway system in 1915 as a section of the Sunset Highway, which continued west through Ellensburg towards Seattle and east through Wenatchee and Waterville towards Spokane. The Sunset Highway was rerouted further north in 1919, leaving the Quincy section to be absorbed by an extension of the North Central Highway, which was numbered as State Road 7 in 1923.

State Road 7, later Primary State Highway 7 (PSH 7), was paved by the state government in the late 1930s and gained a short branch that connected to PSH 18 northeast of Burke. The Quincy highway's bridges were reconstructed by the state government in the early 1950s and its southern terminus was upgraded to an interchange with I-90 in 1964. SR 281 was created during the 1964 state highway renumbering to replace the Quincy–George section of PSH 7 and was codified in 1970.

Civic leaders in the Wenatchee Valley region have proposed upgrading SR 281 to four lanes or full freeway standards several times in the early 21st century, due to its importance as the primary link from Wenatchee to I-90. SR 281 was designated as Critical Rural Freight Corridor by the Federal Highway Administration in 2016, per a request by the Port of Quincy that would precede a plan to widen the highway to four lanes.

== Major intersections ==
The entire route is in Grant County.

Location	mi	km	Destinations	Notes
George	0.00	0.00	I-90 – Seattle, Spokane	
	2.65	4.26	SR 281 Spur to I-90 – Moses Lake, Spokane	
Quincy	10.55	16.98	SR 28 (F Street) – Wenatchee, Ephrata	
1.000 mi = 1.609 km; 1.000 km = 0.621 mi

== Spur route ==
State Route 281 Spur
- Location: Northeast of George
- Length: 1.69 mi (2.72 km)
- Existed: 1971–present

SR 281 has a short spur route near its southern terminus that runs 1.69 miles (2.72 km) from northwest to southeast, connecting the main highway to a junction with I-90 and SR 283. The highway, also known as the Burke Spur, serves as an alternate route for traffic heading east on I-90 and terminates at exit 151, a partial cloverleaf interchange. The spur route was added to the highway's legislative definition in 1971 and carries a daily average of 2,600 to 3,700 vehicles. The route is also listed as part of the National Highway System and primarily serves as a shortcut for traffic using I-90 east of George.

=== Spur intersections ===
The entire route is in Grant County.

Location	mi	km	Destinations	Notes
	0.00	0.00	SR 281 – George, Quincy, Wenatchee	
	1.56	2.51	SR 283 north – Ephrata, Soap Lake, Grand Coulee Dam	
	1.69	2.72	I-90 – Seattle, Spokane	
1.000 mi = 1.609 km; 1.000 km = 0.621 mi
