= Ephrata High School =

Ephrata High School may refer to:

- Ephrata High School (Pennsylvania)
- Ephrata High School (Washington)
