= Washington State Route 28 =

State highway in central Washington, US

State Route 28
- A map of central Washington with SR 28 highlighted in red

Route information
- Maintained by WSDOT
- Length: 135.25 mi (217.66 km)
- Existed: 1964–present

Major junctions
- West end: US 2 / US 97 near East Wenatchee
- SR 281 in Quincy; SR 17 in Soap Lake; SR 21 in Odessa; SR 23 in Harrington
- East end: US 2 in Davenport

Location
- Country: United States
- State: Washington
- Counties: Douglas, Grant, Lincoln

Highway system
- State highways in Washington; Interstate; US; State; Scenic; Pre-1964; 1964 renumbering; Former
← SR 27	→ SR 31

State Route 28 (SR 28) is a state highway in the U.S. state of Washington. It travels 135 miles (217 km) across the central region of the state, passing through Douglas, Grant, and Lincoln counties. The highway begins at an intersection with U.S. Route 2 (US 2) and US 97 near East Wenatchee and travels east through Quincy, Ephrata, and Odessa before terminating at US 2 in Davenport. The route follows the Columbia River and the BNSF Railway's Columbia River Subdivision through the largely rural area between Wenatchee and Davenport.

The Quincy–Davenport route was historically part of the North Central Highway, established in 1915 as part of the early state highway system along a section of the Great Northern Railway. The highway was numbered as State Road 7 in 1923 and connected to Wenatchee via State Road 10, also known as the Chelan and Okanogan Highway. The two highways retained their numbers under the primary numbering system in 1937 and were combined to form SR 28 during the 1964 state highway renumbering.

The SR 28 corridor between East Wenatchee and Quincy remains a highly traveled route and has been the subject of several expansion proposals since the 1980s. The state government reconstructed the East Wenatchee junction with SR 285 in 2013 and plans to widen the highway beginning in 2024.

== Route description ==
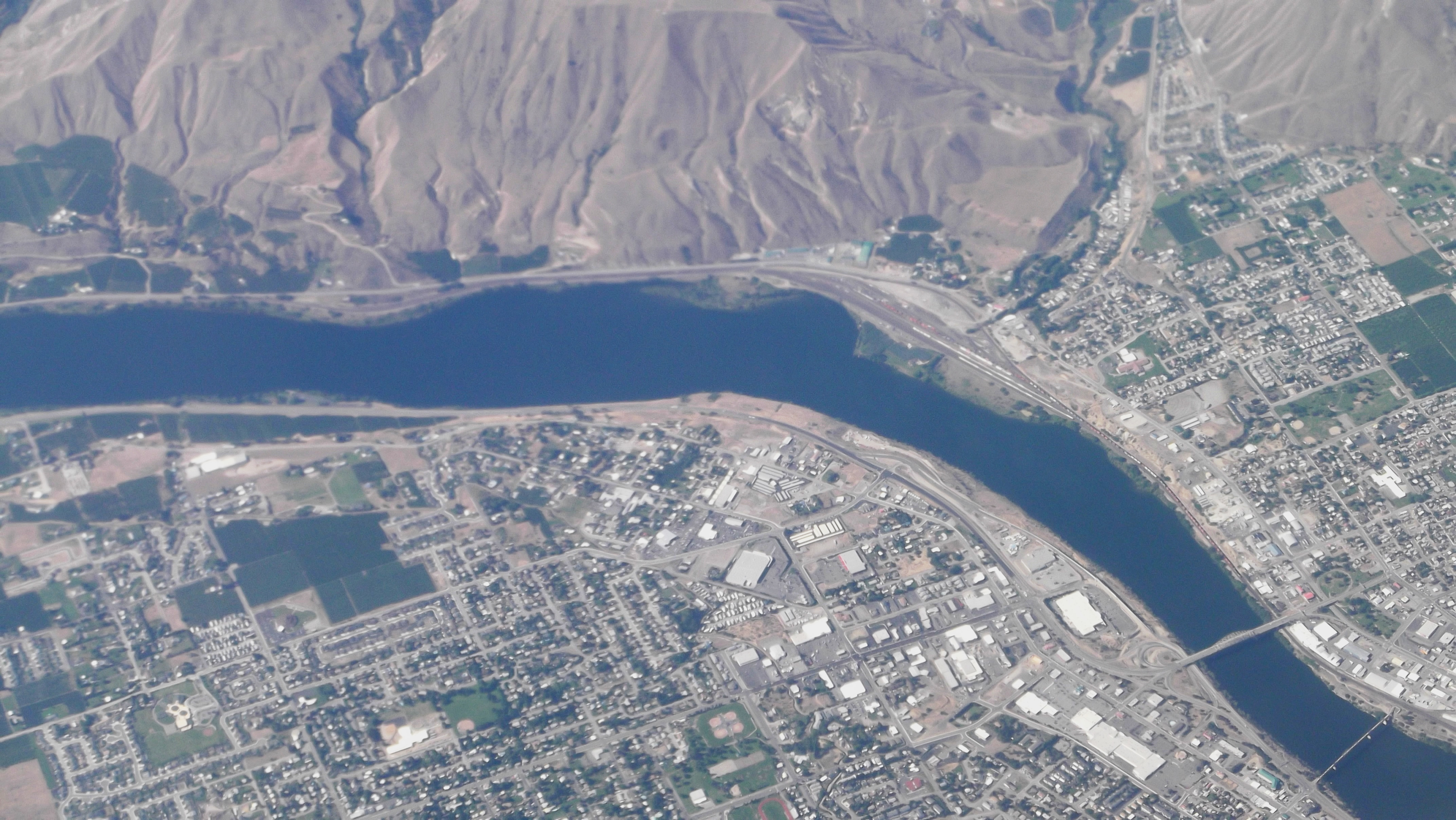
Aerial view of East Wenatchee, showing SR 28 following the Columbia River

SR 28 begins northeast of Wenatchee at an intersection with Eastmont Avenue and the concurrent US 2 and US 97 at the east end of the Richard Odabashian Bridge. The highway travels south through the rural–exurban portion of unincorporated Douglas County and enters East Wenatchee, where it turns southeasterly to follow the Columbia River and the Apple Capital Recreation Loop Trail. SR 28 continues along the west side of the city and passes the historic Columbia River Bridge before reaching an interchange with SR 285. At the interchange, located west of the Wenatchee Valley Mall, the southbound lanes of SR 28 split from the rest of the highway, which is signed as a spur route and intersects SR 285 with a roundabout.

The lanes are rejoined one mile (1.6 km) downriver at the southern city limits of East Wenatchee, from where the highway gradually turns southeast and follows the bank of the Columbia River on the south edge of the Wenatchee plateau. SR 28 passes Pangborn Memorial Airport and the town of Rock Island, where it joins a section of the BNSF Railway's Columbia River Subdivision. The highway turns south near the Rock Island Dam, following the river as it winds around Badger Mountain and the Beezley Hills, passing some scattered vineyards and orchards in the canyon. Near Trinidad, SR 28 turns east and leaves the river and railroad, entering Grant County and ascending from Lynch Coulee. At the top of the Babcock Ridge, the highway rejoins the railroad and travels east past more orchards into Quincy. SR 28 passes several data centers on the edge of the city and continues east through downtown as F Street. In downtown Quincy, the highway intersects SR 281, a connecting route that travels south towards a junction with Interstate 90 (I-90) near George.

The highway leaves Quincy and turns northeast at an intersection with SR 283, crossing under and following the railroad into Ephrata, located on the east edge of the Beezley Hills. SR 28 travels through downtown Ephrata as Basin Street, intersecting SR 282 and passing the city's Amtrak station before leaving the city. The highway continues northeast to a junction with SR 17 in Soap Lake and gradually turns east to follow Crab Creek. SR 28 travels along Crab Creek through the farming communities of Adco, Stratford, and Wilson Creek and passes a Hutterite colony before climbing out of the valley and crossing into Lincoln County. The highway travels southeasterly across the barren shrub-steppe and turns northeast before reaching Odessa, where it intersects SR 21. SR 28 continues northeast along the railroad and Coal Creek through Lamona and reaches the terminus of SR 23 in Harrington. The highway continues northeast from Harrington through rolling terrain and makes a gradual turn to the north, leaving the railroad to follow a section of Bluestem Creek as it approaches Davenport. SR 28 terminates at a junction with US 2 near Davenport Municipal Airport on the west side of the city, several blocks west of the southern terminus of SR 25.

SR 28 is maintained by the Washington State Department of Transportation (WSDOT), which conducts an annual survey on the state's highways to measure traffic volume in terms of annual average daily traffic. The busiest section of the highway, at the interchange with SR 285 in East Wenatchee, carried a daily average of 30,000 vehicles in 2016; the least busiest section of the highway, southwest of Harrington, carried only 530 vehicles. The Wenatchee–Quincy section of SR 28 is listed as a Highway of Statewide Significance and is included on the National Highway System, a network of roads identified as important to the national economy, defense, and mobility.

== History ==
SR 28 was added to the state highway system in 1915 as sections of two major highways: the relocated Sunset Highway from East Wenatchee to Quincy and the new North Central Highway from Quincy to Davenport. The state took over existing county roads along the route of the Great Northern Railway, which was built in 1893 to connect Everett to Spokane. In 1919, the Sunset Highway was moved further north and the East Wenatchee–Quincy section was transferred to the Chelan and Okanogan Highway, which continued north to Chelan and Okanogan.

The 1923 legislature established a numbering system for state highways, designating the North Central Highway as State Road 7 and Chelan and Okanogan Highway as State Road 10. The Wenatchee–Quincy highway was fully completed in 1926, using $200,000 in state appropriations (equivalent to $2.83 million in 2024 dollars) and replacing an earlier road-and-ferry on the west side of the river. Macadam paving of the North Central Highway began in 1927, as part of an accelerated push for improving cross-state highways, and was fully complete by the end of 1930. Both highways were fully paved by the late 1930s and designated in 1937 as Primary State Highway 10 (PSH 10) from East Wenatchee to Quincy and PSH 7 from Quincy to Davenport.

SR 28 was established during the 1964 state highway renumbering, with instituted a system of sign routes (now state routes) to replace the earlier system of primary and secondary highways by 1970. It replaced the East Wenatchee–Quincy section of PSH 10, with the rest absorbed into US 97, and all of PSH 7 except for the Quincy–George section, which became SR 281, a child route of SR 28. In the early 1960s, business groups in Grant County had unsuccessfully sought to move US 2 or a designated alternate route to the corridor that would later become SR 28. The Washington State Highway Commission, chaired by a state senator from Ephrata, endorsed the proposal based on the higher traffic volumes compared to the US 2 corridor through Waterville, but the renumbering was denied in 1963 by the route numbering committee of the American Association of State Highway Officials.

The highway was extended further north through East Wenatchee in 1975 after US 2 was rerouted onto the newly-completed Richard Odabashian Bridge. In the 1980s and 1990s, government officials in East Wenatchee proposed the construction of a parkway along the Columbia River to replace a section of SR 28 with a wider, modern highway. The proposal was shelved due to opposition from local residents and potential impacts on the environment. Parallel to the riverfront proposal, Wenatchee officials announced plans for a four-lane freeway replacing 38 miles (61 km) of SR 28 and SR 281 between Wenatchee and George in 2000. The $430 million project (costing equivalent to $742 million in 2024 dollars), which would have connected Wenatchee to Interstate 90, was rejected by the state government due to the need to fund more urgent projects in the Puget Sound region.

Traffic congestion on the urban sections of SR 28 had grown considerably by the early 2000s, leading to WSDOT publishing new traffic studies and project plans for the corridor. The SR 285 interchange in East Wenatchee was identified in a 2002 study as in need of a near-term rebuild and long-term conversion into a single-point urban interchange. The interim configuration, comprising a southbound bypass roadway with several ramps, was constructed between 2011 and 2013 at a cost of $28 million. The original intersection, now serving northbound traffic, was replaced with a roundabout in August 2017.

A long-term plan adopted in 2006 proposed widening the East Wenatchee section of the highway to four lanes by 2025 to meet projected demand from a larger regional population. The plan also included an extension of Eastmont Avenue to the US 2 and US 97 intersection, functioning as a bypass of East Wenatchee. The 3.2-mile (5.1 km) extension project was completed in November 2013 and cost $10 million to construct. The widening of SR 28 between 9th and 19th streets, estimated to cost $58 million, was funded by the legislature in 2015 and is scheduled to begin construction in 2024.

== Major intersections ==
County	Location	mi	km	Destinations	Notes
Douglas		0.00	0.00	US 2 / US 97 / Eastmont Avenue – Seattle, Ellensburg, Spokane, Okanogan	Western terminus
Douglas	East Wenatchee	4.05	6.52	SR 285 north / 5th Street – Wenatchee	Interchange
Grant	Quincy	33.84	54.46	SR 281 south (Central Avenue) to I-90 – George	
Grant		46.16	74.29	SR 283 south to I-90 – Ellensburg	
Grant	Ephrata	50.70	81.59	SR 282 east to I-90 – Moses Lake	Western terminus of SR 282
Grant	Soap Lake	56.96	91.67	SR 17 – Soap Lake, Grand Coulee Dam, Moses Lake	
Lincoln	Odessa	97.79	157.38	SR 21 – Wilbur, Lind	
Lincoln	Harrington	122.19	196.65	SR 23 south – Harrington, Sprague	
Lincoln	Davenport	135.25	217.66	US 2 to SR 25 north – Wenatchee, Spokane	Eastern terminus
1.000 mi = 1.609 km; 1.000 km = 0.621 mi
