= Washington State Route 285 =

State highway in Washington, US

State Route 285

- SR 285 highlighted in red

Route information
- Auxiliary route of SR 28
- Maintained by WSDOT
- Length: 5.04 mi (8.11 km)
- Existed: 1977–present

Major junctions
- South end: SR 28 in East Wenatchee
- North end: US 2 / US 97 in Sunnyslope

Location
- Country: United States
- State: Washington
- Counties: Douglas, Chelan

Highway system
- State highways in Washington; Interstate; US; State; Scenic; Pre-1964; 1964 renumbering; Former
← SR 283	→ SR 290

State Route 285 (SR 285) is a short state highway serving Douglas and Chelan counties, located in the U.S. state of Washington. The highway serves Wenatchee and runs 5 miles (8 km) from an interchange with State Route 28 (SR 28) in East Wenatchee to Downtown Wenatchee, crossing the Columbia River on the Senator George Sellar Bridge. After traversing downtown, the highway ends at an interchange with U.S. Route 2 (US 2) and US 97 north of the Wenatchee River in Sunnyslope.

The highway originally crossed the Columbia River on an earlier bridge built in 1908. The bridge was signed as part of State Road 7 in 1909 and later State Road 2 (the Sunset Highway) in 1923. The roadway was used by US 10 from 1926 until 1940, when it was re-routed and replaced by an alternate route. US 2 was extended from Idaho into Washington in 1946 and used the bridge until the newer Senator George Sellar Bridge was built to the south in 1950. SR 285 was designated in 1977 after US 2 was routed onto the Richard Odabashian Bridge north of Wenatchee and East Wenatchee. The area around the Senator George Sellar Bridge is being improved by the Washington State Department of Transportation to handle increased traffic.

== Route description ==
SR 285 begins its 5.04-mile-long (8.11 km) long route at a partial cloverleaf interchange with SR 28 west of the Wenatchee Valley Mall in East Wenatchee. The freeway crosses the Columbia River from Douglas County into Wenatchee and Chelan County on the Senator George Sellar Bridge, listed as a part of the National Register of Historic Places. The highway becomes Stevens Street and has a small interchange with Wenatchee Avenue before turning north onto Mission Street.

SR 285 serves Downtown Wenatchee and splits into a one-way pair with southbound lanes on Chelan Avenue and northbound lanes staying on Mission Street, passing the Wenatchee branch of the NCW Libraries at Memorial Park and the Wenatchee Valley Hospital. The one-way pair rejoins the main route, turning north as Miller Street and then northwest as Wenatchee Avenue into West Wenatchee near Wenatchee Confluence State Park. Wenatchee Avenue crosses the Wenatchee River into Sunnyslope and becomes a freeway, intersecting Penny Road and Easy Street in an incomplete diamond interchange before ending at an interchange with US 2 and US 97.

The Senator George Sellar Bridge is the busiest section of SR 285, being used by a daily average of 52,000 vehicles in 2011. The southern end of the one-way pair, at the intersection of Chelan Avenue and Mission Street, had a daily average of 22,000 vehicles in 2011.

== History ==
The cantilever truss Columbia River Bridge was built in 1908 by the Washington Bridge Company and purchased by the Washington State Highway Commission the following year to serve Wenatchee and East Wenatchee, divided by the Columbia River. The bridge and the streets were signed as State Road 7 in 1909 as part of the highway from Renton to Idaho, later named the Sunset Highway in 1913. The Sunset Highway became State Road 2 in a 1923 renumbering before the creation of US 10 in 1926.

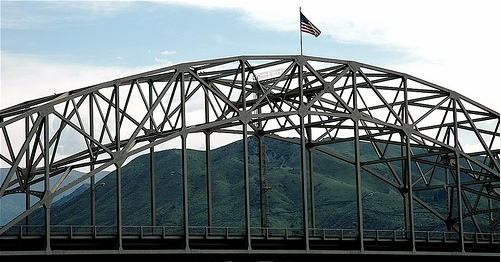
The Senator George Sellar Bridge, constructed in 1950, was used by US 2 until 1975 and is now used by SR 285.

State Road 2 became Primary State Highway 2 (PSH 2) in 1937 during the creation of the primary and secondary state highway system. US 10 was re-routed south to cross the Columbia River at Vantage in the 1940s and was designated as US 10 Alternate, until US 2 was extended from Bonners Ferry, Idaho to Everett in 1946. The Columbia River Bridge was replaced by a new bridge (since 2000 named Senator George Sellar Bridge) in 1950 and US 2 was re-routed south onto the bridge. PSH 2 was decommissioned during the 1964 renumbering and US 2 remained. US 2 was re-routed, along with US 97, onto the Richard Odabashian Bridge in Sunnyslope, bypassing Wenatchee in 1975. SR 285 was established in 1977 to maintain the Senator George Sellar Bridge and only included the short route until 1991, when it was extended to Sunnyslope.

Between May 2009 and July 2011, the Washington State Department of Transportation (WSDOT) added an additional eastbound lane on the Sellar Bridge by moving the sidewalks to a new structure on the outside of the bridge, opening on July 29, 2011. A southbound bypass lane for SR 28 was completed in 2013. At the west end of the bridge, in Downtown Wenatchee, a new off-ramp to Crescent Street and signal improvements at Mission Street were completed in December 2013.

== Major intersections ==
County	Location	mi	km	Destinations	Notes
Douglas	East Wenatchee	0.00	0.00	SR 28 to US 2 – Quincy, Ephrata, Ninth Street, Valley Mall Parkway, East Wenatchee City Center	Southern terminus
Columbia River		0.16– 0.39	0.26– 0.63	Senator George Sellar Bridge	
Chelan	Wenatchee	0.39– 0.47	0.63– 0.76	Wenatchee Avenue – Business Center, Convention Center	Interchange, northbound exit and southbound entrance
Chelan	Wenatchee	1.11	1.79	Chelan Avenue	Southern terminus of one-way pair
Chelan	Wenatchee	2.86	4.60	Miller Street	Northern terminus of one-way pair
Chelan	Sunnyslope			South end of freeway	
Chelan	Sunnyslope	4.48– 4.58	7.21– 7.37	Easy Street, Penny Road	Northbound exit and southbound entrance
Chelan	Sunnyslope	4.93– 5.04	7.93– 8.11	US 2 / US 97 – Yakima, Ellensburg, Okanogan, Spokane	Northern terminus
1.000 mi = 1.609 km; 1.000 km = 0.621 mi: Incomplete access
