= Lamona, Washington =

Unincorporated community in Washington, United States

- Unincorporated community
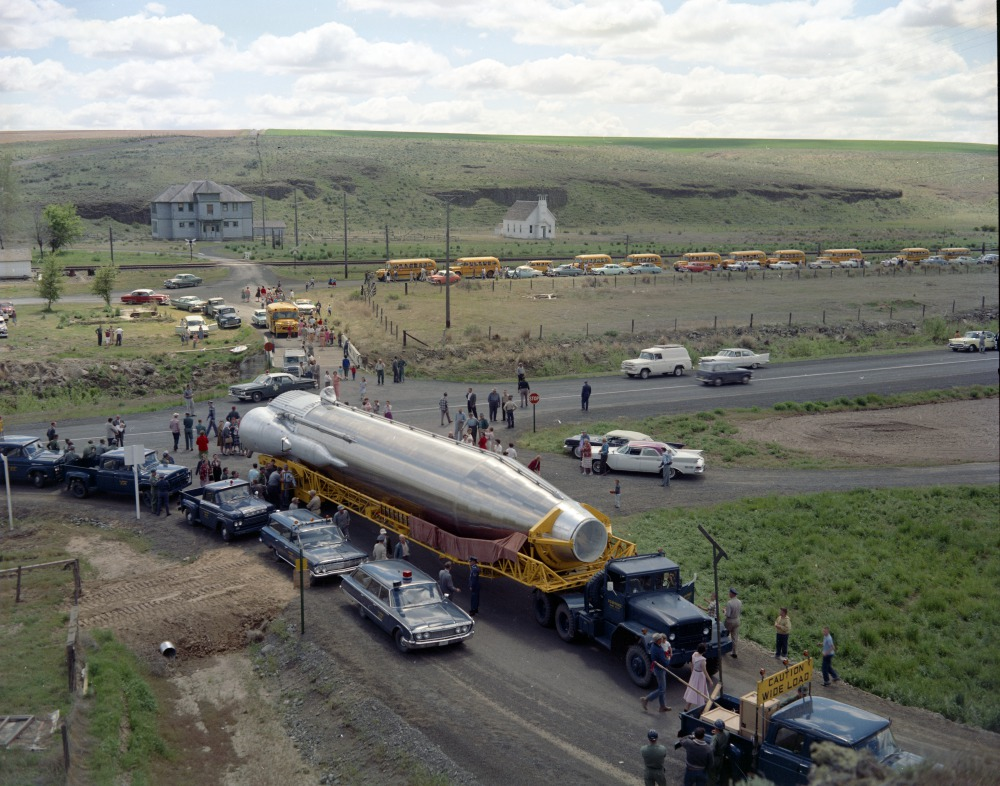
- Atlas 41E missile on its way to Fairchild Air Force Base making a brief stop for school children in Lamona in 1961.

- Location within Washington (state) Location within the United States
- Coordinates: 47°21′34″N 118°28′53″W
- Country: United States
- State: Washington
- County: Lincoln
- Elevation: 1,797 ft (548 m)
- Time zone: UTC-8 (Pacific (PST))
  - Summer (DST): UTC-7 (PDT)
- ZIP codes: 99144
- GNIS feature ID: 1511086

Lamona is an unincorporated community located in southern Lincoln County, Washington, United States, between Odessa and Harrington on State Route 28. Lamona is located at an elevation of 1,797 feet (548 m) above sea level.

Lamona was named for its first merchant, in 1892–1893, J.H. Lamona.
