= Washington State Route 282 =

State highway in Grant County, Washington, US

State Route 282

- SR 282 highlighted in red

Route information
- Auxiliary route of SR 28
- Maintained by WSDOT
- Length: 4.92 mi (7.92 km)
- Existed: 1964–present

Major junctions
- West end: SR 28 in Ephrata
- East end: SR 17 near Ephrata

Location
- Country: United States
- State: Washington
- Counties: Grant

Highway system
- State highways in Washington; Interstate; US; State; Scenic; Pre-1964; 1964 renumbering; Former
← SR 281	→ SR 283

State Route 282 (SR 282) is a 4.92-mile-long (7.92 km) state highway in the U.S. state of Washington, serving Grant County. The highway travels southeast from SR 28 in Ephrata to Ephrata Municipal Airport and an intersection with SR 17. Prior to its establishment during the 1964 highway renumbering, SR 282 was a branch of Secondary State Highway 11G (SSH 11G).

== Route description ==
SR 282 begins at an intersection with Basin Street, signed as SR 28, located within the city of Ephrata in Grant County. The highway travels southeast over a BNSF rail line south of Amtrak Station before leaving Ephrata and passing Ephrata Municipal Airport. SR 282 continues southeast and ends at SR 17 southeast of Ephrata as SR 17 turns southeast towards Moses Lake.

Every year, the Washington State Department of Transportation (WSDOT) conducts a series of surveys on its highways in the state to measure traffic volume. This is expressed in terms of annual average daily traffic (AADT), which is a measure of traffic volume for any average day of the year. In 2011, WSDOT calculated that between 6,400 and 8,000 vehicles per day used the highway as a shortcut between Ephrata and Moses Lake.

== History ==
SR 282 was established during the 1964 highway renumbering as the successor to a branch route of SSH 11G connecting the main highway to Ephrata, established in 1951. After being codified in 1970, SR 282 was built and opened to traffic. The highway was repaved in fall 2009 as part of the American Recovery and Reinvestment Act.

== Major intersections ==
The entire highway is in Grant County.

Location	mi	km	Destinations	Notes
Ephrata	0.00	0.00	SR 28 – Quincy, City Center	Western terminus
	4.92	7.92	SR 17 – Soap Lake, Moses Lake	Eastern terminus
1.000 mi = 1.609 km; 1.000 km = 0.621 mi
