= East Wenatchee Bench, Washington =

- Former CDP
- Location of East Wenatchee Bench, Washington
- Coordinates: 47°25′0″N 120°16′31″W
- Country: United States
- State: Washington
- County: Douglas

Area
  - Total: 9.0 sq mi (23.4 km^{2})
  - Land: 8.4 sq mi (21.8 km^{2})
  - Water: 0.62 sq mi (1.6 km^{2})
- Elevation: 920 ft (280 m)

Population (2000)
  - Total: 13,658
  - Density: 1,622/sq mi (626.4/km^{2})
- Time zone: UTC-8 (Pacific (PST))
  - Summer (DST): UTC-7 (PDT)
- FIPS code: 53-20190
- GNIS feature ID: 1867607

East Wenatchee Bench is a former census-designated place in Douglas County, Washington, United States. Most of the area has been annexed by the city of East Wenatchee. It was part of the Wenatchee–East Wenatchee Metropolitan Statistical Area. The population was 13,658 at the 2000 census, but it was no longer a CDP in the 2010 census because most of its populated area was annexed by East Wenatchee.

== Geography ==
East Wenatchee Bench is located at 47°25′0″N 120°16′31″W (47.416541, -120.275336).

According to the United States Census Bureau, the CDP has a total area of 9.0 square miles (23 km^{2}), of which, 8.4 square miles (22 km^{2}) is land and 0.6 square miles (1.6 km^{2}) (6.76%) is water.

== Demographics ==
As of the census of 2000, there were 13,658 people, 4,834 households, and 3,765 families residing in the CDP. The population density was 1,622.3 people per square mile (626.4 people/km^{2}). There were 5,048 housing units at an average density of 599.6 units per square mile (231.5 units/km^{2}). The racial makeup of the CDP was 89.73% White, 0.21% African American, 0.91% Native American, 0.61% Asian, 0.07% Pacific Islander, 6.68% from other races, and 1.79% from two or more races. Hispanic or Latino of any race were 12.64% of the population.

There were 4,834 households, out of which 40.0% had children under the age of 18 living with them, 62.6% were married couples living together, 10.9% had a female householder with no husband present, and 22.1% were non-families. 17.6% of all households were made up of individuals, and 7.1% had someone living alone who was 65 years of age or older. The average household size was 2.79 and the average family size was 3.14.

In the CDP, the age distribution of the population shows 29.3% under the age of 18, 8.0% from 18 to 24, 27.8% from 25 to 44, 23.0% from 45 to 64, and 12.0% who were 65 years of age or older. The median age was 36 years. For every 100 females, there were 94.4 males. For every 100 females age 18 and over, there were 91.6 males.

The median income for a household in the CDP was $45,496, and the median income for a family was $50,246. Males had a median income of $39,448 versus $25,226 for females. The per capita income for the CDP was $18,176. About 8.3% of families and 11.0% of the population were below the poverty line, including 15.9% of those under age 18 and 7.3% of those age 65 or over.
