= Senator George Sellar Bridge =

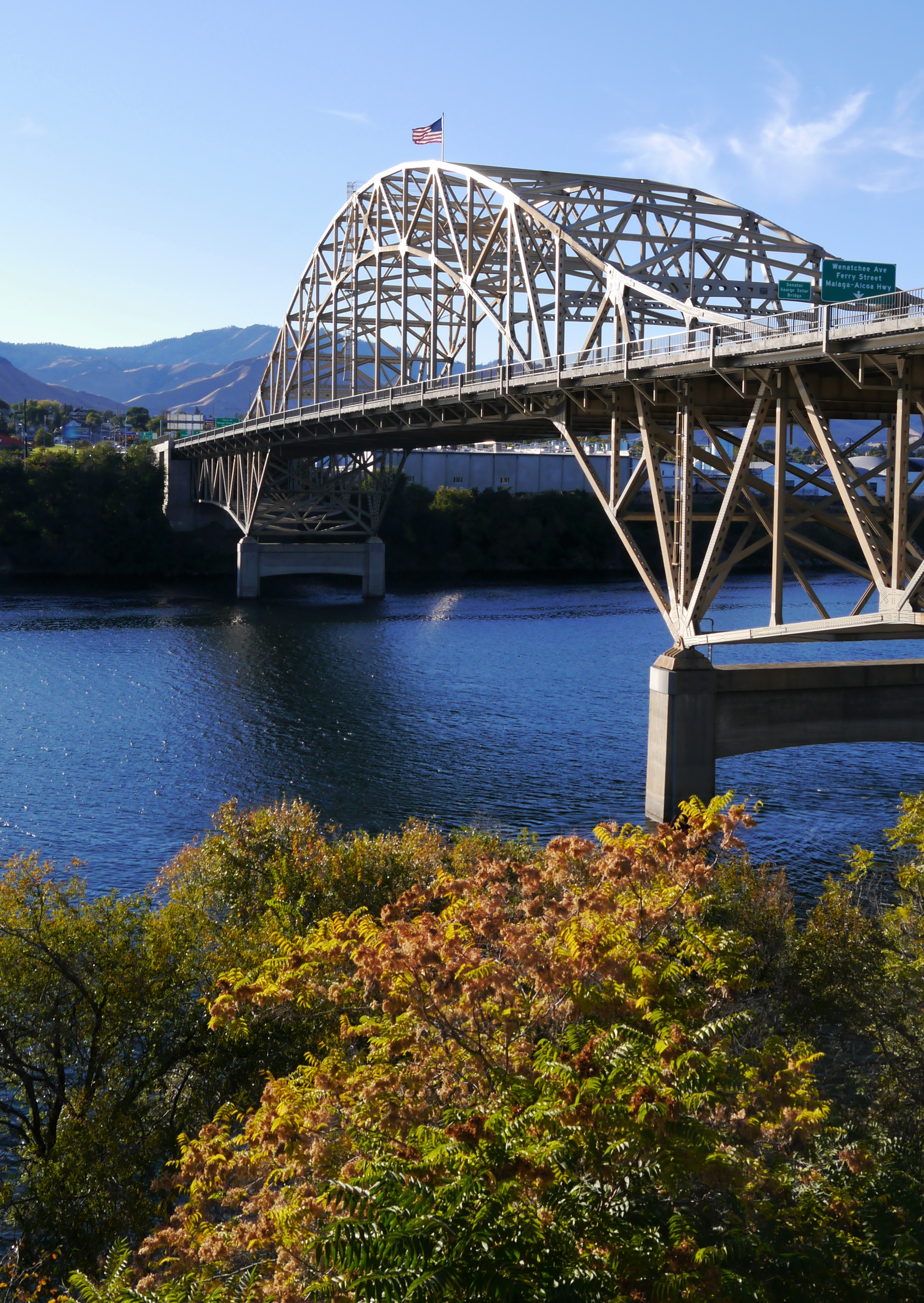
- Coordinates: 47°24′35″N 120°17′44″W
- Carries: SR 285
- Crosses: Columbia River
- Locale: East Wenatchee, Washington / Wenatchee, Washington
- Maintained by: State of Washington

Characteristics
- Design: Through arch bridge
- Total length: 1,208 feet (368 m)
- Longest span: 480 feet (150 m)
- Clearance below: 85 feet (26 m)

History
- Opened: October 28, 1950
- Replaces: Columbia River Bridge (Wenatchee, Washington)
- Senator George Sellar Bridge
- U.S. National Register of Historic Places
- Location within Washington (state)
- Nearest city: Wenatchee, Washington
- Area: less than one acre
- Built: 1950
- Built by: Washington State Department of Highways
- MPS: Bridges of Washington State MPS
- NRHP reference No.: 95000623
- Added to NRHP: May 24, 1995

Location
- Interactive map of Senator George Sellar Bridge

The Senator George Sellar Bridge at Wenatchee, Washington was built in 1950 as the "Columbia River Bridge" to carry U.S. Route 2 across the Columbia River.

The steel suspended tied-arch bridge has a main span of 480 feet (150 m) with 224-foot (68 m) anchor arms. The suspended portion of roadway comprises 352 feet (107 m) and is 54 feet (16 m) wide, carrying five lanes (originally four) with a median divider strip at a height of 180 feet (55 m) above mean water level. The new bridge was recognized by the American Institute of Steel Construction as the most beautiful bridge of 1950 for spans over 400 feet (120 m) in length. The bridge's engineer was R. W. Finke. The contractor was the General Construction Company of Seattle, using steel fabricated by the American Bridge Company. The bridge rests on two concrete piers in the river, with the central arch between them, and cantilever spans extending to concrete abutments high on the riverbanks.

The bridge was renamed in 2000 after George L. Sellar, a Washington state senator who died that year. Since then, the name "Columbia River Bridge" refers to the older bridge (built in 1908) nearby. Senator George Sellar Bridge carries Washington State Route 285 since the construction of the Richard Odabashian Bridge for Route 2 farther north. An additional lane was added in 2009–2010. The bridge was placed on the National Register of Historic Places on May 24, 1995.

== See also ==
- List of crossings of the Columbia River
