= East Wenatchee, Washington =

- City
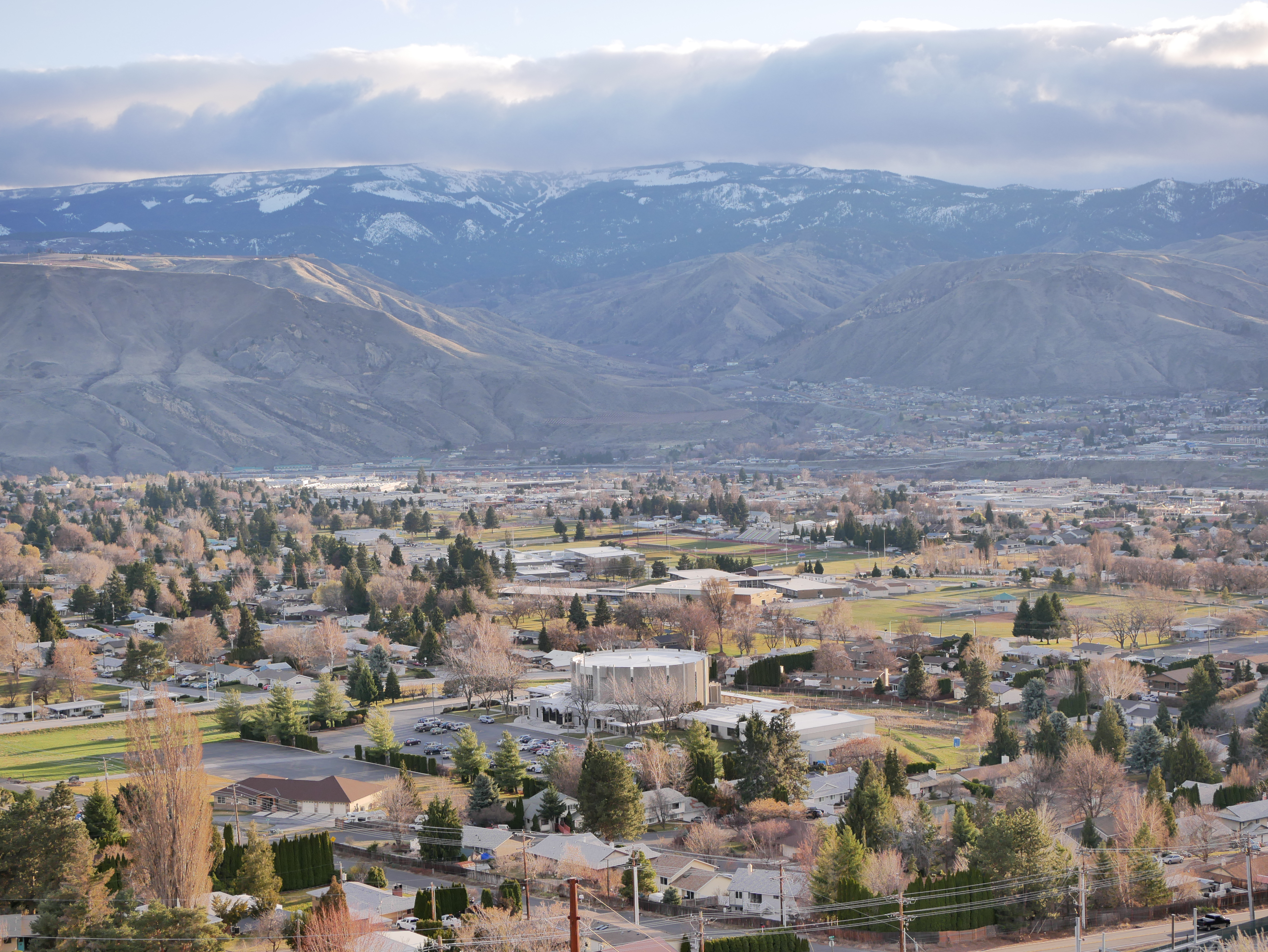
- View of the Columbia River from the eastern hills of East Wenatchee

- Seal

- Location in the state of Washington
- Coordinates: 47°25′03″N 120°16′56″W
- Country: United States
- State: Washington
- County: Douglas
- Incorporated: March 11, 1935

Government
  - Type: Mayor–council
  - Mayor: Jerrilea Crawford

Area
  - Total: 4.10 sq mi (10.61 km^{2})
  - Land: 3.79 sq mi (9.81 km^{2})
  - Water: 0.31 sq mi (0.79 km^{2})
- Elevation: 846 ft (258 m)

Population (2020)
  - Total: 14,158
  - Density: 3,740/sq mi (1,440/km^{2})
- Time zone: UTC-8 (PST)
  - Summer (DST): UTC-7 (PDT)
- ZIP code: 98802
- Area code: 509
- FIPS code: 53-20155
- GNIS feature ID: 2410391
- Website: www.eastwenatcheewa.gov

East Wenatchee is a city in Douglas County, Washington, United States. The population at the 2010 census was 13,190, a 129.1% increase on the 2000 census, having annexed much of the East Wenatchee Bench CDP. As of the 2020 census, the population increased to 14,158.

East Wenatchee lies on the east shore of the Columbia River, opposite Wenatchee on the west shore. On November 10, 2002, East Wenatchee was designated a principal city of the Wenatchee – East Wenatchee Metropolitan Statistical Area by the Office of Management and Budget.

== History ==
=== Founding and early years ===
At the turn of the 20th century irrigation projects, including the Columbia Basin Project east of the region, fostered the development of intensive agriculture in the shrub-steppe native to the region. Fruit orchards become one of the area's leading industries.

In 1908, the first highway bridge to span the Columbia River opened. The privately owned bridge carried people, horses, wagons, and automobiles; it also supported two large water pipelines along its sides. It connected Chelan County on the west (Wenatchee) shore with Douglas County on the East Wenatchee shore. The bridge opened East Wenatchee and the rest of Douglas County to apple orchard development. Still standing today, the bridge is a 1,060-foot (320 m) pin-connected steel cantilever bridge and cost $177,000 to build. It once carried the Sunset Highway (State Highway 2) across the river.

The bridge was the brainchild of W. T. Clark, one of the builders of the Highline Canal, a major irrigation project to water the apple orchards in the valley. It was financed in part by James J. Hill (1838–1916), of the Great Northern Railway (which arrived in Wenatchee in 1892). In its second year of operation the canal firm that owned it decided to start charging tolls.

This prompted local leaders to hasten to the state legislature to persuade the state to purchase the bridge as part of the state highway system. The state purchased the bridge despite the state-employed consultant's opinion "that the ugliness of the structure is very apparent" (Dorpat), despite defects in the timber floor and concrete piers, and despite leaks in the waterpipes.

The structure remained in full use until 1950 when the Senator George Sellar Bridge was built. Today, it remains as a footbridge on the Apple Capital Recreation Loop Trail and still has the old pipeline running across it.

=== Incorporation and growth ===
On February 28, 1935, citizens voted, 48 in favor and 46 against, to incorporate the town of East Wenatchee. When the town was incorporated on March 11, 1935, the original town site was 50 acres (200,000 m^{2}). Through subsequent annexations, the town has grown into a city. Today, East Wenatchee's boundaries encompass 3.67 square miles (9.5 km^{2}). From its foundation in agriculture, the region's economy has diversified to include year-round tourism and a variety of other industries.

=== Landing of first trans-pacific airplane flight ===
On October 5, 1931, East Wenatchee became part of aviation history. Having taken off from Misawa, Japan, pilots Clyde Pangborn and Hugh Herndon Jr. safely belly-landed their Bellanca airplane, Miss Veedol, on a nearby airstrip known then as Fancher Field. After take off, the pilots intentionally jettisoned the landing gear to conserve fuel. This flight was the first nonstop flight across the Pacific Ocean. In honor of this pioneering flight, East Wenatchee's airport is called Pangborn Memorial Airport, the Pangborn-Herndon Memorial Site, listed on the National Register of Historic Places, is nearby, and Miss Veedol's propeller is displayed in the Wenatchee Valley Museum & Cultural Center.

=== Clovis points discovery ===
On May 27, 1987, East Wenatchee became part of archaeological history. On that date, while digging in an orchard just east of the city, farmworkers accidentally discovered a cache of 11,000-year-old Clovis points and other artifacts, left there by Pleistocene hunters. The East Wenatchee Clovis Site, near Pangborn Airport, was explored in two subsequent archaeological digs in 1988 and 1990, was closed to science by the landowner after protests by local Native American tribes. The legal moratorium on new archaeological work at the site ended on June 1, 2007.

== Geography ==
According to the United States Census Bureau, the city has a total area of 3.81 square miles (9.87 km^{2}), of which, 3.80 square miles (9.84 km^{2}) is land and 0.01 square miles (0.03 km^{2}) is water.

=== Climate ===
Climate data for Pangborn Memorial Airport
Month	Jan	Feb	Mar	Apr	May	Jun	Jul	Aug	Sep	Oct	Nov	Dec	Year
Record high °F (°C)	60 (16)	65 (18)	78 (26)	93 (34)	103 (39)	109 (43)	108 (42)	109 (43)	101 (38)	90 (32)	70 (21)	62 (17)	109 (43)
Mean daily maximum °F (°C)	33.9 (1.1)	42.2 (5.7)	53.1 (11.7)	62.2 (16.8)	71.3 (21.8)	78.9 (26.1)	87.5 (30.8)	86.2 (30.1)	76.9 (24.9)	61.6 (16.4)	44.3 (6.8)	33.6 (0.9)	61.0 (16.1)
Mean daily minimum °F (°C)	22.1 (−5.5)	27.1 (−2.7)	33.3 (0.7)	39.7 (4.3)	47.2 (8.4)	54.3 (12.4)	60.5 (15.8)	59.9 (15.5)	51.5 (10.8)	40.4 (4.7)	30.6 (−0.8)	23.2 (−4.9)	40.8 (4.9)
Record low °F (°C)	−12 (−24)	−15 (−26)	6 (−14)	25 (−4)	32 (0)	38 (3)	43 (6)	42 (6)	31 (−1)	15 (−9)	−5 (−21)	−21 (−29)	−21 (−29)
Average precipitation inches (mm)	1.09 (28)	0.79 (20)	0.62 (16)	0.59 (15)	0.64 (16)	0.55 (14)	0.26 (6.6)	0.31 (7.9)	0.30 (7.6)	0.46 (12)	1.07 (27)	1.38 (35)	8.06 (205.1)
Average snowfall inches (cm)	10.3 (26)	4.3 (11)	1.6 (4.1)	0.0 (0.0)	0.0 (0.0)	0.0 (0.0)	0.0 (0.0)	0.0 (0.0)	0.0 (0.0)	0.2 (0.51)	4.2 (11)	12.0 (30)	32.6 (82.61)

== Economy ==
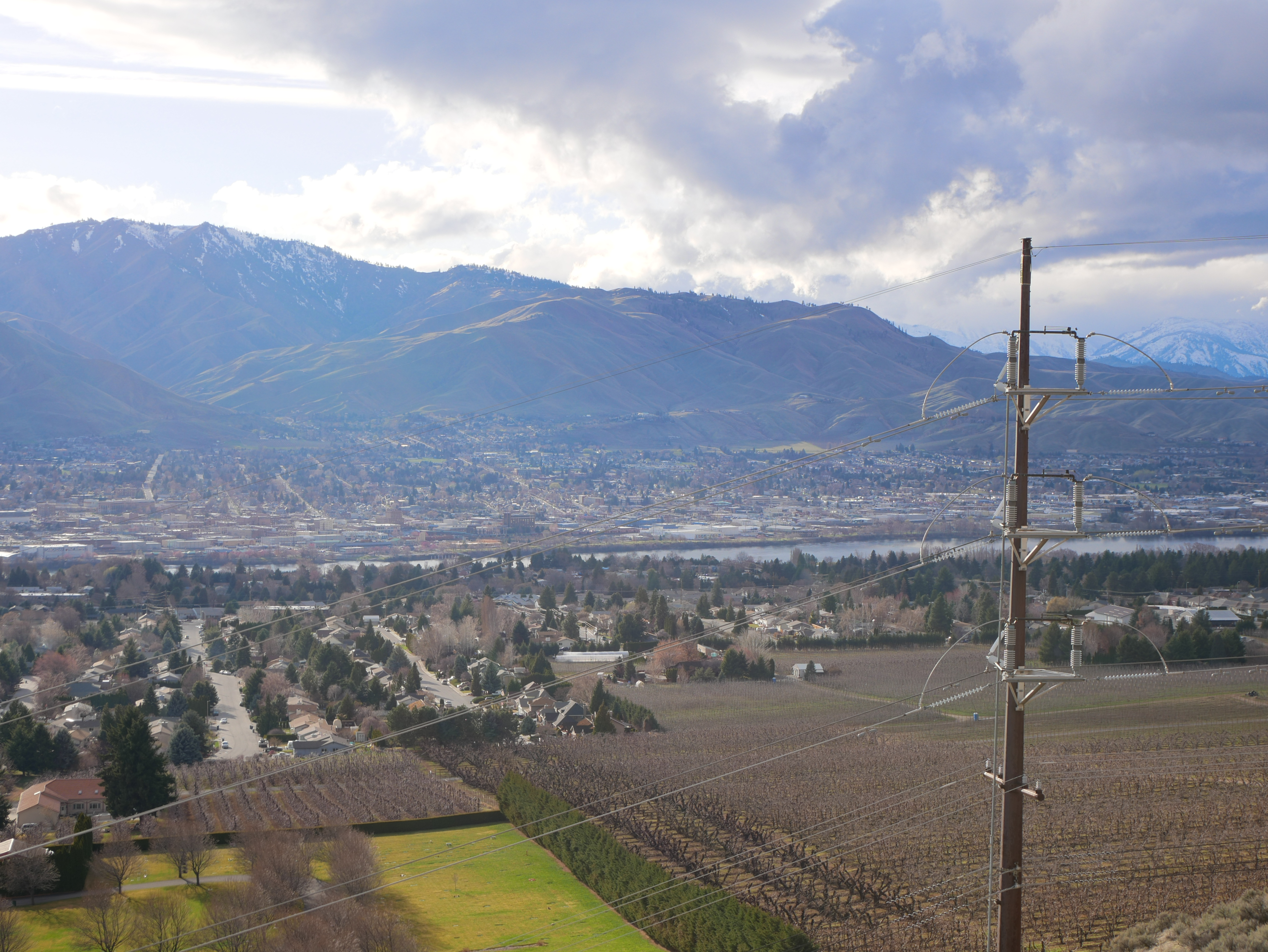
East Wenatchee Washington- looking NW, Columbia River in the valley below

There are many orchards surrounding East Wenatchee. Commercial crops primarily include apples, sweet cherries and pears. Apricots, peaches, nectarines, and plums are also grown. Wheat and other grain are also grown on farms in the outlying areas near East Wenatchee.

The area's major shopping centers are Wenatchee Valley Mall and Valley North Mall.

== Recreational activities ==
Activities in East Wenatchee include:

- Alpine skiing (Mission Ridge, Stevens Pass)
- Boating, water skiing, and wake boarding (Columbia River)
- Hiking (trails and area parks, including the Apple Capital Recreation Loop Trail)
- Kayaking and rafting (Columbia or Wenatchee rivers)
- Fishing
- Parks (Confluence, Hydro, Walla Walla, Lincoln, all parks by the water)

== Demographics ==
Historical population
Census	Pop.	Note	%±
1940	268		—
1950	389		45.1%
1960	383		−1.5%
1970	913		138.4%
1980	1,640		79.6%
1990	2,701		64.7%
2000	5,757		113.1%
2010	13,190		129.1%
2020	14,158		7.3%
U.S. Decennial Census

=== 2020 census ===
As of the 2020 census, East Wenatchee had a population of 14,158, 5,295 households, and 3,631 families. The population density was 3,736.6 per square mile (1,442.7/km^{2}). There were 5,479 housing units at an average density of 1,446.0 per square mile (558.3/km^{2}).

100.0% of residents lived in urban areas, while 0.0% lived in rural areas.

There were 5,295 households in East Wenatchee, of which 35.2% had children under the age of 18 living in them. Of all households, 47.5% were married-couple households, 17.6% were households with a male householder and no spouse or partner present, and 26.4% were households with a female householder and no spouse or partner present. About 23.9% of all households were made up of individuals and 10.9% had someone living alone who was 65 years of age or older.

There were 5,479 housing units, of which 3.4% were vacant. The homeowner vacancy rate was 0.9% and the rental vacancy rate was 2.1%.

The average household size was 2.8 and the average family size was 3.2. The percent of those with a bachelor's degree or higher was estimated to be 12.6% of the population.

The median age was 36.4 years. 25.4% of residents were under the age of 18; 8.7% were from 18 to 24; 26.4% were from 25 to 44; 22.1% were from 45 to 64; and 17.4% were 65 years of age or older. For every 100 females there were 96.2 males, and for every 100 females age 18 and over there were 93.6 males.

Racial composition as of the 2020 census
Race	Number	Percent
White	9,533	67.3%
Black or African American	73	0.5%
American Indian and Alaska Native	206	1.5%
Asian	170	1.2%
Native Hawaiian and Other Pacific Islander	29	0.2%
Some other race	2,232	15.8%
Two or more races	1,915	13.5%
Hispanic or Latino (of any race)	4,435	31.3%

=== 2010 census ===
As of the 2010 census, there were 13,190 people, 4,997 households, and 3,517 families residing in the city. The population density was 3,471.1 inhabitants per square mile (1,340.2/km^{2}). There were 5,275 housing units at an average density of 1,388.2 per square mile (536.0/km^{2}). The racial makeup of the city was 80.1% White, 0.3% African American, 1.2% Native American, 0.9% Asian, 0.1% Pacific Islander, 14.0% from other races, and 3.4% from two or more races. Hispanic or Latino of any race were 23.4% of the population.

There were 4,997 households, of which 36.5% had children under the age of 18 living with them, 50.4% were married couples living together, 14.3% had a female householder with no husband present, 5.6% had a male householder with no wife present, and 29.6% were non-families. 22.9% of all households were made up of individuals, and 9% had someone living alone who was 65 years of age or older. The average household size was 2.63 and the average family size was 3.08.

The median age in the city was 35.2 years. 26.4% of residents were under the age of 18; 9.9% were between the ages of 18 and 24; 24.9% were from 25 to 44; 24.5% were from 45 to 64; and 14.2% were 65 years of age or older. The gender makeup of the city was 48.4% male and 51.6% female.

== Government and politics ==
East Wenatchee has a mayor–council government. The city council consists of seven members; the mayor presides at city council meetings and acts as the city's executive officer.

== Education ==
Public K-12 education is provided by the Eastmont School District #206. The district has several schools in the city:

- Cascade Elementary
- Grant Elementary
- Kenroy Elementary
- Lee Elementary
- Rock Island Elementary
- Clovis Intermediate School
- Sterling Junior High School
- Eastmont Junior High School
- Eastmont High School

East Wenatchee was home to the only public school in Washington named after Confederate general Robert E. Lee. It was constructed in 1955 and the school district rejected a name change in 2015 and again in August 2017. The school district voted to change the name from Robert E. Lee Elementary School to Lee Elementary School in 2018.

== Transportation ==
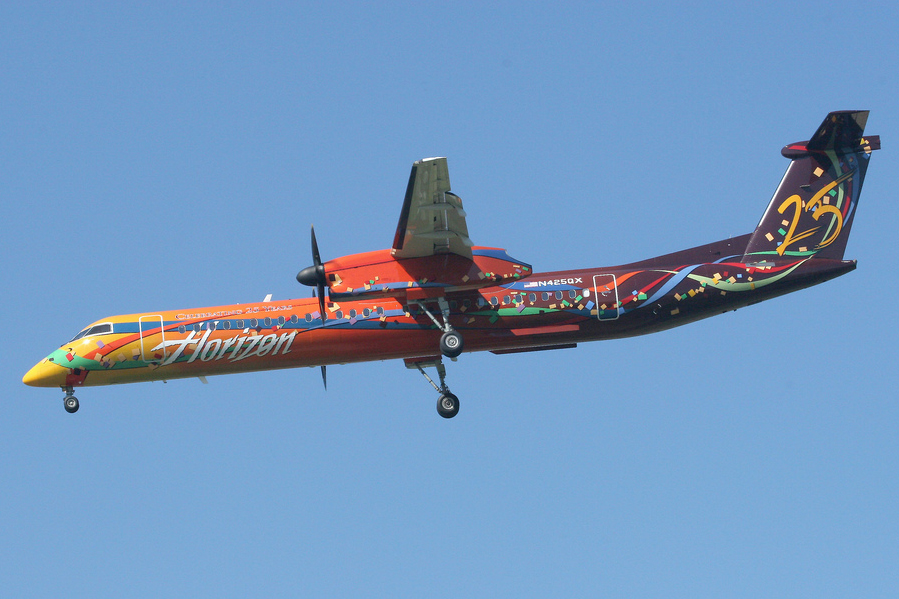
Horizon Air Dash 8 Q-400 landing at Pangborn Airport

=== Bus ===
Link Transit provides public transportation throughout the Wenatchee valley including routes that connect the cities of Wenatchee and East Wenatchee with Leavenworth, Chelan, and Waterville.

=== Air ===
The city is served by Pangborn Memorial Airport with daily flights to Seattle–Tacoma International Airport provided by Alaska Airlines.

=== Roads and highways ===
East Wenatchee is serviced by State Route 28, State Route 285, U.S. Route 97, and U.S. Route 2.

== Notable people ==
- Clyde Ballard, politician and former state representative
- Cary Condotta, politician and former state representative
- Brad Hawkins, politician
- Jack Owen Spillman, serial killer
- Karla Wilson, politician and former state representative

== Sister cities ==
East Wenatchee has one sister city:

- Misawa, Aomori Prefecture, Japan
