= Ephrata High School (Washington) =

Coordinates: 47°19′32.28″N 119°33′1.68″W

Location
- 333 4th Avenue Northwest; Ephrata, (Grant County), Washington 98823; United States

Information
- Type: Public high school
- Motto: Tiger Strong
- Established: 1914
- Principal: Ashlie Miller
- Staff: 43.43 (FTE)
- Enrollment: 925 (2023-2024)
- Student to teacher ratio: 21.30
- Colors: Black and orange
- Fight song: Fight On
- Mascot: Tiger
- Nickname: Tigers

Ephrata High School, located in Ephrata, Washington, is a high school that serves 731 students in grades 9 through 12. The current principal is Ashlie Miller.

== Demographics ==
77% of the school's students are white, while 17% are Hispanic, 2% are Asian, 2% are black and 1% are American Indian.
