= Columbia River Subdivision =

Railway line in Washington State

The Columbia River Subdivision or Columbia River Sub is a railway line running about 167 miles (269 km) from Wenatchee to Spokane, Washington. It is operated by BNSF Railway as part of their Northern Transcon. The original line (built in 1893) was built as part of James J. Hill's Great Northern Railway transcontinental railway line.

== Train service ==
The Amtrak Empire Builder operates once each way per day along the corridor. The far western part of the line sees upwards of 40 freight trains a day. But the section between Everett and Spokane can see 25 trains per day.
