= Odessa, Washington =

- Town
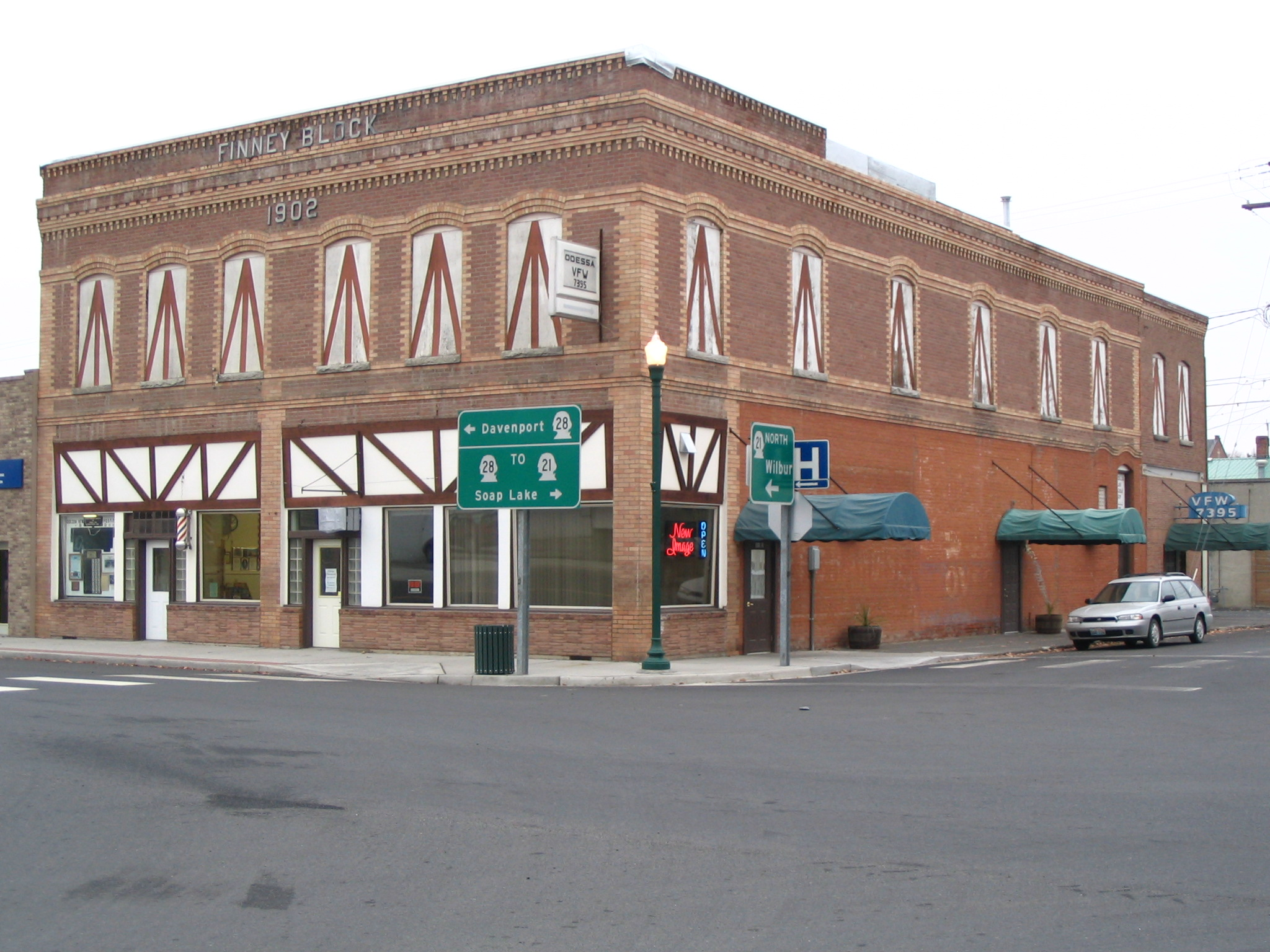

- Location of Odessa, Washington
- Coordinates: 47°20′N 118°41′W
- Country: United States
- State: Washington
- County: Lincoln

Government
  - Type: Mayor–council
  - Mayor: William Crossley

Area
  - Total: 0.81 sq mi (2.10 km^{2})
  - Land: 0.81 sq mi (2.10 km^{2})
  - Water: 0 sq mi (0.00 km^{2})
- Elevation: 1,549 ft (472 m)

Population (2020)
  - Total: 896
  - Density: 1,110/sq mi (427/km^{2})
- Time zone: UTC-8 (Pacific (PST))
  - Summer (DST): UTC-7 (PDT)
- ZIP codes: 99144, 99159
- Area code: 509
- FIPS code: 53-50745
- GNIS feature ID: 1507143
- Website: odessawa.org

Odessa is a town in Lincoln County, Washington, United States. The population was 896 at the 2020 census.

== History ==
A post office called Odessa has been in operation since 1898. The area was originally built up chiefly by Volga Germans, and was named after Odesa, Ukraine.

Odessa was officially incorporated on September 25, 1902.

== Geography ==
Odessa is located at 47°20′N 118°41′W (47.3332, -118.6882) in southeastern Lincoln County near the border with Adams County.

Washington State Routes 21 and 28 have a junction in Odessa. State Route 21 connects Odessa with U.S. Route 2 to the north and Interstate 90 to the south. State Route 28 provides east-west connections with communities in Lincoln County and to the west in Grant County.

Crab Creek passes through Odessa, and State Route 28 roughly follows its path in the broader Odessa area. The town lies near the middle of the Channeled Scablands region, carved by the Missoula Floods at the end of the last ice age.

According to the United States Census Bureau, the town has a total area of 0.82 square miles (2.12 km^{2}), all of it land.

== Climate ==
Odessa has a Cold semi-arid climate (BSk) according to the Köppen climate classification system.

Climate data for Odessa, Washington (1991–2020 normals, extremes 1902–present)
Month	Jan	Feb	Mar	Apr	May	Jun	Jul	Aug	Sep	Oct	Nov	Dec	Year
Record high °F (°C)	62 (17)	68 (20)	83 (28)	93 (34)	100 (38)	115 (46)	112 (44)	112 (44)	104 (40)	91 (33)	73 (23)	63 (17)	115 (46)
Mean daily maximum °F (°C)	36.3 (2.4)	43.2 (6.2)	52.9 (11.6)	61.8 (16.6)	71.3 (21.8)	78.2 (25.7)	87.6 (30.9)	87.1 (30.6)	77.8 (25.4)	61.9 (16.6)	45.9 (7.7)	35.8 (2.1)	61.6 (16.4)
Daily mean °F (°C)	29.7 (−1.3)	34.1 (1.2)	41.3 (5.2)	47.9 (8.8)	56.3 (13.5)	62.5 (16.9)	69.9 (21.1)	69.2 (20.7)	60.6 (15.9)	48.1 (8.9)	36.7 (2.6)	28.8 (−1.8)	48.8 (9.3)
Mean daily minimum °F (°C)	23.1 (−4.9)	25.0 (−3.9)	29.7 (−1.3)	33.9 (1.1)	41.2 (5.1)	46.8 (8.2)	52.1 (11.2)	51.3 (10.7)	43.4 (6.3)	34.3 (1.3)	27.5 (−2.5)	21.9 (−5.6)	35.8 (2.1)
Record low °F (°C)	−33 (−36)	−27 (−33)	−1 (−18)	10 (−12)	20 (−7)	25 (−4)	32 (0)	25 (−4)	15 (−9)	−2 (−19)	−17 (−27)	−24 (−31)	−33 (−36)
Average precipitation inches (mm)	1.51 (38)	1.01 (26)	1.07 (27)	0.83 (21)	1.01 (26)	0.77 (20)	0.37 (9.4)	0.24 (6.1)	0.34 (8.6)	0.90 (23)	1.37 (35)	1.66 (42)	11.08 (281)
Average snowfall inches (cm)	4.9 (12)	1.5 (3.8)	0.8 (2.0)	0.0 (0.0)	0.0 (0.0)	0.0 (0.0)	0.0 (0.0)	0.0 (0.0)	0.0 (0.0)	0.0 (0.0)	2.0 (5.1)	4.7 (12)	13.9 (35)
Average precipitation days (≥ 0.01 in)	9.4	7.4	7.9	6.0	6.2	4.8	2.3	2.3	2.8	5.8	9.1	8.7	72.7
Average snowy days (≥ 0.1 in)	3.0	1.2	0.6	0.0	0.0	0.0	0.0	0.0	0.0	0.0	1.0	3.5	9.3
Source: NOAA

== Demographics ==
Historical population
Census	Pop.	Note	%±
1910	885		—
1920	1,050		18.6%
1930	830		−21.0%
1940	816		−1.7%
1950	1,127		38.1%
1960	1,231		9.2%
1970	1,074		−12.8%
1980	1,009		−6.1%
1990	935		−7.3%
2000	957		2.4%
2010	910		−4.9%
2020	896		−1.5%
U.S. Decennial Census; 2020 Census

=== 2010 census ===
As of the 2010 census, there were 910 people, 394 households, and 253 families living in the town. The population density was 1,109.8 inhabitants per square mile (428.5/km^{2}). There were 460 housing units at an average density of 561.0 per square mile (216.6/km^{2}). The racial makeup of the town was 95.5% White, 0.3% African American, 1.3% Native American, 0.2% Asian, 1.0% from other races, and 1.6% from two or more races. Hispanic or Latino of any race were 2.6% of the population.

There were 394 households, of which 23.9% had children under the age of 18 living with them, 50.5% were married couples living together, 8.4% had a female householder with no husband present, 5.3% had a male householder with no wife present, and 35.8% were non-families. 32.7% of all households were made up of individuals, and 17.7% had someone living alone who was 65 years of age or older. The average household size was 2.23 and the average family size was 2.78.

The median age in the town was 50.8 years. 21.9% of residents were under the age of 18; 4.8% were between the ages of 18 and 24; 15.6% were from 25 to 44; 31.3% were from 45 to 64; and 26.4% were 65 years of age or older. The gender makeup of the town was 47.1% male and 52.9% female.

=== 2000 census ===
As of the 2000 census, there were 957 people, 405 households, and 268 families living in the town. The population density was 1,170.9 people per square mile (450.6/km^{2}). There were 472 housing units at an average density of 577.5 per square mile (222.2/km^{2}). The racial makeup of the town was 97.39% White, 0.21% African American, 0.52% Native American, 0.94% from other races, and 0.94% from two or more races. Hispanic or Latino of any race were 1.25% of the population.

There were 405 households, out of which 26.7% had children under the age of 18 living with them, 56.0% were married couples living together, 6.9% had a female householder with no husband present, and 33.6% were non-families. 29.1% of all households were made up of individuals, and 17.3% had someone living alone who was 65 years of age or older. The average household size was 2.28 and the average family size was 2.83.

In the town, the population was spread out, with 23.7% under the age of 18, 4.4% from 18 to 24, 21.2% from 25 to 44, 23.5% from 45 to 64, and 27.2% who were 65 years of age or older. The median age was 46 years. For every 100 females, there were 93.7 males. For every 100 females age 18 and over, there were 88.1 males.

The median income for a household in the town was $34,038, and the median income for a family was $38,594. Males had a median income of $30,764 versus $20,357 for females. The per capita income for the town was $17,461. About 7.9% of families and 10.6% of the population were below the poverty line, including 14.8% of those under age 18 and 9.9% of those age 65 or over.

== Special events ==
Each year the town hosts the Odessa Deutschesfest, which occurs on the third weekend in September. Several thousand guests travel from distant places to experience the German festival. Attractions include the Sausage Bowl (Odessa High School 8-man football), quilt display, art show, horseshoe tournament, Historisches Museum, bed and tricycle races, flea market, parade featuring modern farm machinery, Jugend (Youth) Garten, German Biergarten, and food circus. Some of the foods featured at the event include traditional German sausage, kartoffel und kloese, reuben sandwiches, borscht soup, kuchen, apple strudel, hot potato salad, pfeffernüsse, cabbage rolls, and a variety of homemade pies.
