= George, Washington =

- City
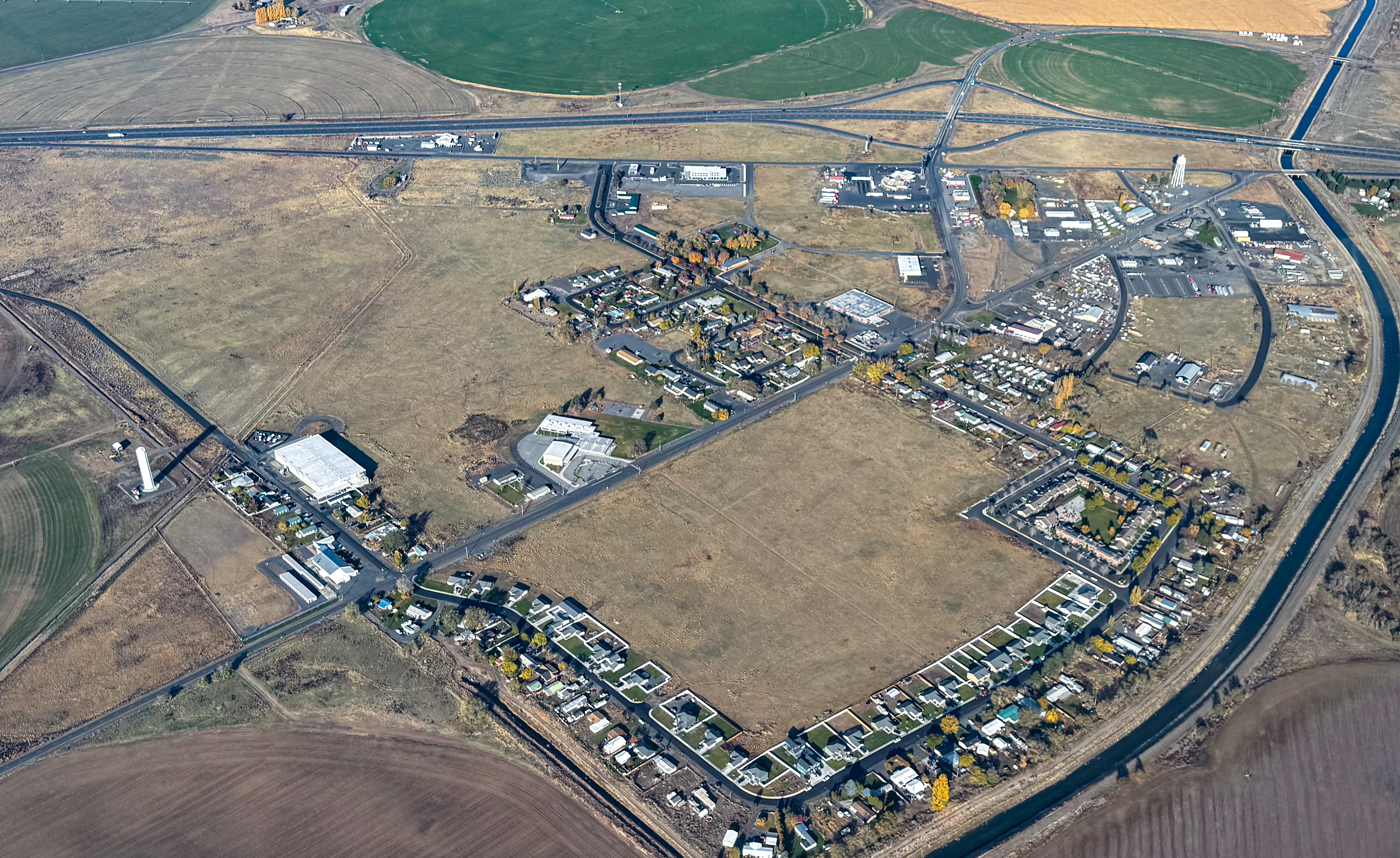

- Location of George, Washington

- Location in Washington George, Washington (the United States)
- Coordinates: 47°04′37″N 119°51′28″W
- Country: United States
- State: Washington
- County: Grant

Government
  - Type: Mayor–council
  - Mayor: Juan Villalpando

Area
  - Total: 1.38 sq mi (3.57 km^{2})
  - Land: 1.38 sq mi (3.57 km^{2})
  - Water: 0 sq mi (0.00 km^{2})
- Elevation: 1,224 ft (373 m)

Population (2020)
  - Total: 809
  - Density: 374.6/sq mi (144.64/km^{2})
- Time zone: UTC-8 (Pacific (PST))
  - Summer (DST): UTC-7 (PDT)
- ZIP codes: 98824, 98848
- Area code: 509
- FIPS code: 53-26455
- GNIS feature ID: 2410581
- Website: cityofgeorge.org

George is a city in Grant County, Washington, United States. The population was 809 at the 2020 census. The "humorous homage" to President George Washington has landed George on lists of unusual place names.

The city is known for being near The Gorge Amphitheatre, sometimes called "The Gorge at George". The Gorge Amphitheatre was the location of the annual Sasquatch! Music Festival.

The city also celebrates national holidays such as the Fourth of July and Washington's Birthday, with cherry pies. The world's largest cherry pie is also baked every year on July 4, and served to a crowd.

== History ==
George began as a large irrigation district between Quincy and Moses Lake. In the early 1950s, the need for a town to support local agricultural businesses was evident, and the Bureau of Land Management agreed to 339 acres (1.37 km^{2}) for this purpose. The sole bid was from a local pharmacist, Charlie Brown, who invested his own money in the venture and solicited planning help from a University of Washington instructor. The plan included streets, utilities, and other infrastructure.

When filing the papers for the town with the BLM, Brown decided that the town should be named after the first President of the United States, George Washington.

The citizens of the town have named their streets after varieties of cherries grown in the area, such as Bing and Royal Anne.

The town was officially incorporated on November 4, 1957, at a ceremony including Governor Albert Rosellini and a 1,000-pound (450 kg) cherry pie.

== Geography ==
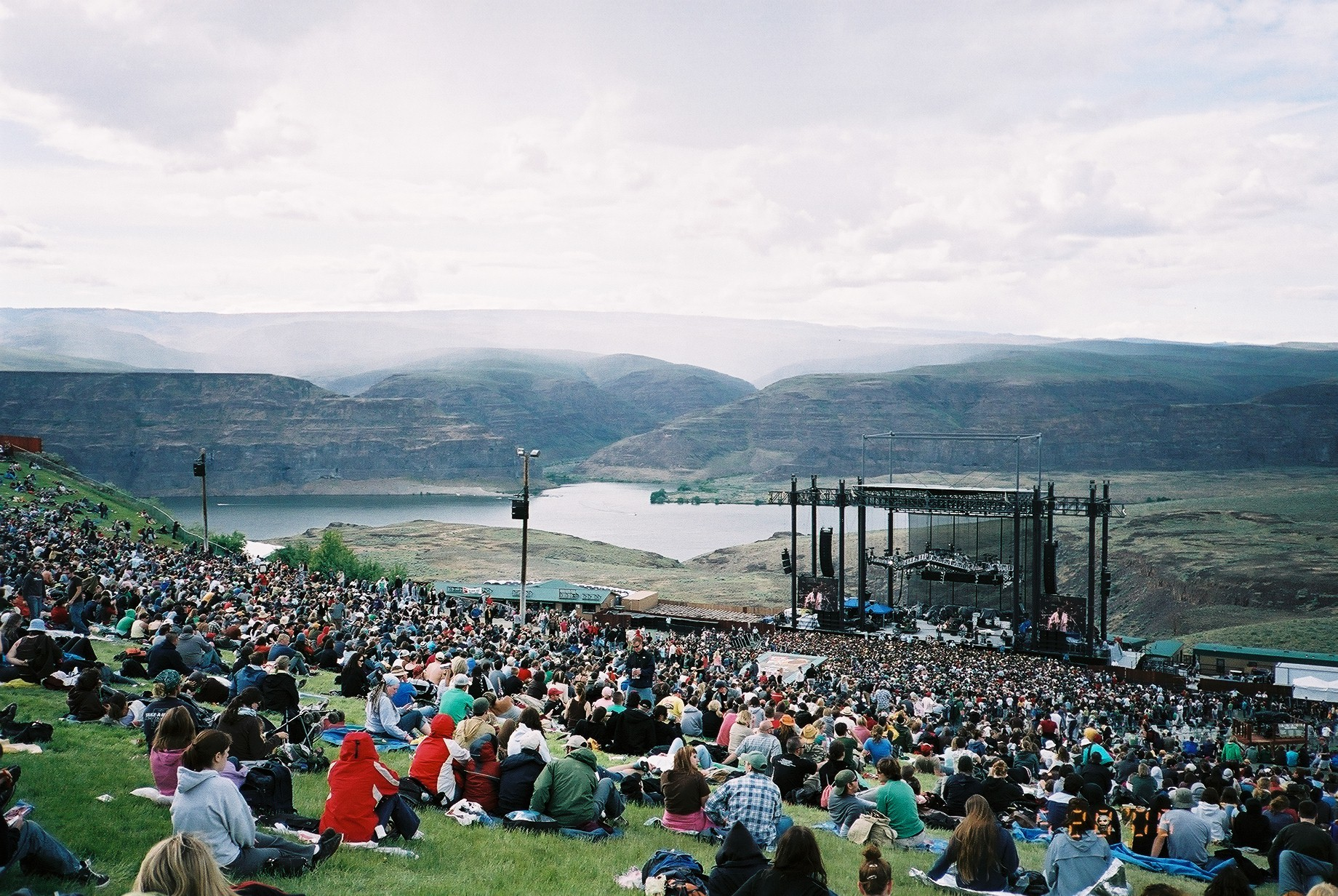
The Gorge Amphitheatre in George

According to the United States Census Bureau, the city has a total area of 1.33 square miles (3.44 km^{2}), all of it land.

=== Climate ===
According to the Köppen Climate Classification system, George has a cold desert climate, abbreviated "BWk" on climate maps.

Climate data for George, WA
Month	Jan	Feb	Mar	Apr	May	Jun	Jul	Aug	Sep	Oct	Nov	Dec	Year
Record high °F (°C)	63 (17)	73 (23)	78 (26)	92 (33)	99 (37)	113 (45)	109 (43)	107 (42)	100 (38)	89 (32)	75 (24)	64 (18)	113 (45)
Mean daily maximum °F (°C)	36 (2)	44 (7)	55 (13)	64 (18)	73 (23)	81 (27)	88 (31)	88 (31)	78 (26)	64 (18)	47 (8)	37 (3)	63 (17)
Mean daily minimum °F (°C)	22 (−6)	27 (−3)	32 (0)	38 (3)	46 (8)	52 (11)	58 (14)	57 (14)	48 (9)	37 (3)	30 (−1)	23 (−5)	39 (4)
Record low °F (°C)	−29 (−34)	−25 (−32)	0 (−18)	14 (−10)	21 (−6)	33 (1)	34 (1)	37 (3)	26 (−3)	9 (−13)	−15 (−26)	−19 (−28)	−29 (−34)
Average precipitation inches (mm)	0.95 (24)	0.75 (19)	0.71 (18)	0.49 (12)	0.66 (17)	0.55 (14)	0.39 (9.9)	0.33 (8.4)	0.41 (10)	0.57 (14)	1.08 (27)	1.22 (31)	8.11 (206)
Average snowfall inches (cm)	4.8 (12)	1.5 (3.8)	0.3 (0.76)	0 (0)	0 (0)	0 (0)	0 (0)	0 (0)	0 (0)	0 (0)	1.2 (3.0)	5 (13)	12.8 (33)

== Demographics ==
Historical population
Census	Pop.	Note	%±
1970	273		—
1980	261		−4.4%
1990	253		−3.1%
2000	528		108.7%
2010	501		−5.1%
2020	809		61.5%
U.S. Decennial Census; 2020 Census

=== 2020 census ===
As of the 2020 census, George had a population of 809. The median age was 24.4 years. 39.2% of residents were under the age of 18 and 6.6% of residents were 65 years of age or older. For every 100 females there were 101.2 males, and for every 100 females age 18 and over there were 108.5 males age 18 and over.

0.0% of residents lived in urban areas, while 100.0% lived in rural areas.

There were 219 households in George, of which 56.2% had children under the age of 18 living in them. Of all households, 47.5% were married-couple households, 18.3% were households with a male householder and no spouse or partner present, and 24.2% were households with a female householder and no spouse or partner present. About 14.1% of all households were made up of individuals and 4.5% had someone living alone who was 65 years of age or older.

There were 248 housing units, of which 11.7% were vacant. The homeowner vacancy rate was 2.5% and the rental vacancy rate was 10.3%.

Racial composition as of the 2020 census
Race	Number	Percent
White	142	17.6%
Black or African American	2	0.2%
American Indian and Alaska Native	13	1.6%
Asian	1	0.1%
Native Hawaiian and Other Pacific Islander	0	0.0%
Some other race	471	58.2%
Two or more races	180	22.2%
Hispanic or Latino (of any race)	722	89.2%

=== 2010 census ===
At the 2010 census there were 501 people, 131 households, and 109 families living in the city. The population density was 376.7 inhabitants per square mile (145.4/km^{2}). There were 168 housing units at an average density of 126.3 per square mile (48.8/km^{2}). The racial makeup of the city was 38.1% White, 1.4% Native American, 59.9% from other races, and 0.6% from two or more races. 75.0% of all residents were Hispanic or Latino.

Of the 131 households 60.3% had children under the age of 18 living with them, 61.8% were married couples living together, 9.9% had a female householder with no husband present, 11.5% had a male householder with no wife present, and 16.8% were non-families. 8.4% of households were one person and 2.3% were one person aged 65 or older. The average household size was 3.82 and the average family size was 4.14.

The median age was 24.8 years. 35.9% of residents were under the age of 18; 14.9% were between the ages of 18 and 24; 28% were from 25 to 44; 15% were from 45 to 64; and 6.4% were 65 or older. The gender makeup of the city was 54.1% male and 45.9% female.

=== 2000 census ===
At the 2000 census, there were 528 people, 141 households, and 106 families living in the city. The population density was 879.2 people per square mile (339.8/km^{2}). There were 162 housing units at an average density of 269.8 per square mile (104.2/km^{2}). The racial makeup of the city was 80.11% White, 0.57% Native American, 0.38% Asian, 16.10% from other races, and 2.84% from two or more races. Hispanic or Latino of any race were 60.23% of the population.

Of the 141 households 49.6% had children under the age of 18 living with them, 58.2% were married couples living together, 6.4% had a female householder with no husband present, and 24.8% were non-families. 18.4% of households were one person and 5.7% were one person aged 65 or older. The average household size was 3.74, and the average family size was 4.39. The age distribution was 37.7% under the age of 18, 16.5% from 18 to 24, 26.9% from 25 to 44, 14.0% from 45 to 64, and 4.9% 65 or older. The median age was 23 years. For every 100 females, there were 118.2 males. For every 100 females age 18 and over, there were 140.1 males.

The median household income was $21,181 and the median family income was $23,571. Males had a median income of $21,667 versus $13,875 for females. The per capita income for the city was $7,779. About 33.0% of families and 36.2% of the population were below the poverty line, including 46.8% of those under age 18 and 14.0% of those age 65 or over.

== Education ==
The city is served by the Quincy School District.

== See also ==
- Cristóbal, Colón
- Fillmore, Utah
- Joe, Montana
