= Ephrata, Washington =

- City
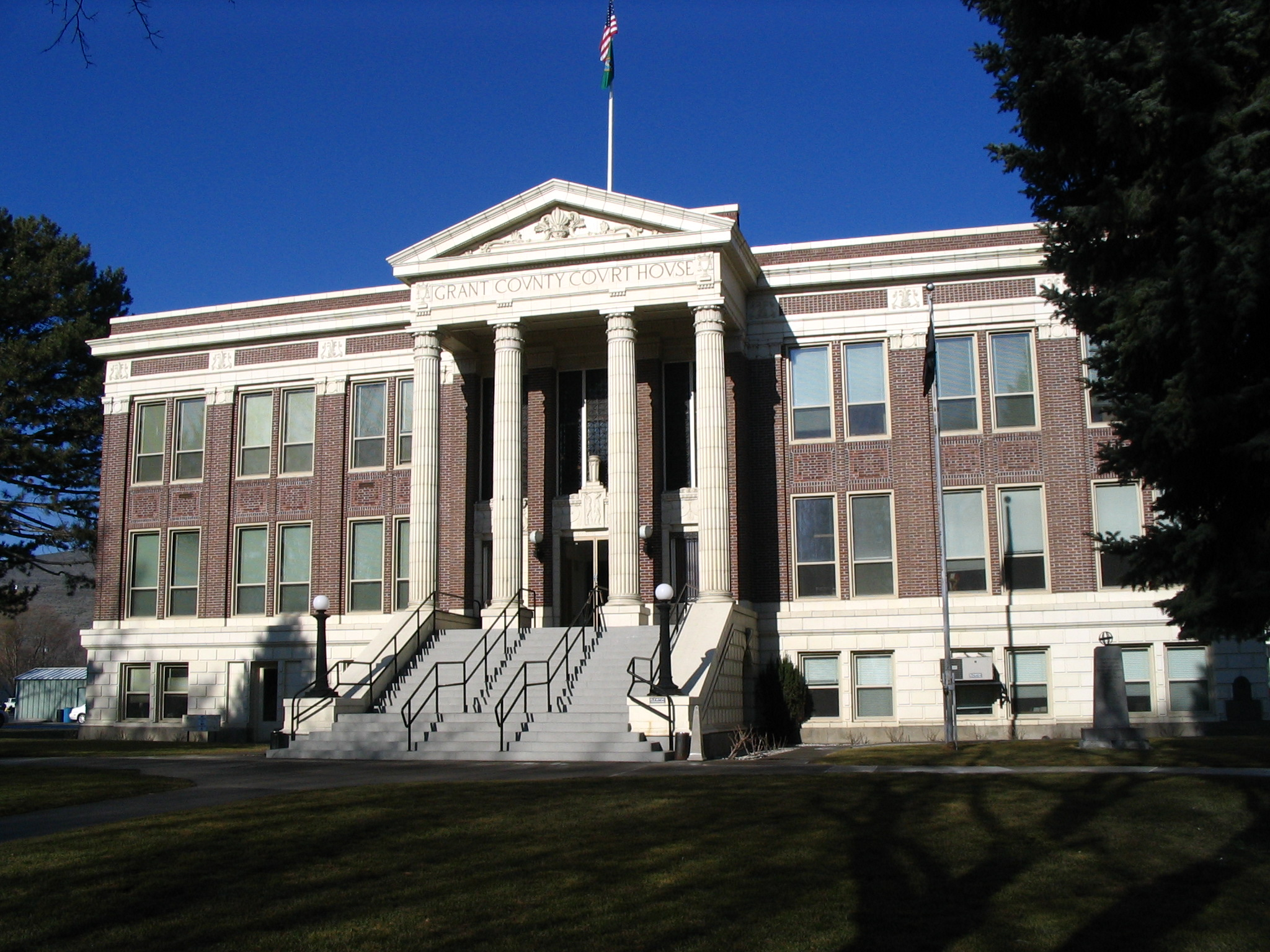
- Grant County Courthouse in Ephrata, pictured in 2008

- Location of Ephrata, Washington
- Coordinates: 47°19′1″N 119°32′53″W
- Country: United States
- State: Washington
- County: Grant

Government
  - Type: Mayor–council
  - Mayor: Bruce Reim

Area
  - Total: 10.44 sq mi (27.03 km^{2})
  - Land: 10.44 sq mi (27.03 km^{2})
  - Water: 0 sq mi (0.00 km^{2})
- Elevation: 1,276 ft (389 m)

Population (2020)
  - Total: 8,477
  - Estimate (2024): 8,718
  - Density: 812/sq mi (313.6/km^{2})
- Time zone: UTC-8 (PST)
  - Summer (DST): UTC-7 (PDT)
- ZIP Code: 98823
- Area code: 509
- FIPS code: 53-22080
- GNIS feature ID: 2410450
- Website: www.ephrata.org

Ephrata (/iːˈfreɪtə/ ee-FRAY-tə) is a city in and the county seat of Grant County, Washington, United States. Its population was 8,477 at the 2020 census, and was estimated to be 8,718 in 2024.

== History ==
Ephrata was officially incorporated on June 21, 1909 and was given the county seat for the newly created Grant County.

The settlement of Ephrata is quite recent. There was no known settlement until 1886, just three years before Washington gained statehood. The horse rancher Frank Beezley was the first to settle near the natural springs, thus the area was known as Beezley Springs. As the climate and topography were not promising to settlement, the entire region remained sparsely populated until several federal congressional actions, including the Northern Pacific Land Grant Act, the Homestead Act, and Desert Claims Act, encouraged the settlement of this semi-arid desert-like area. Originally, Douglas County spread over the entire territory of the Big Bend of the Columbia River. In 1909, the Washington State legislature divided it, creating Grant County. When the time came to present arguments to the state legislature regarding which town should be the county seat, someone apparently intentionally intoxicated the representative of a rival community, and Ephrata was chosen.

It is generally believed that the city was named Ephrata by a man who worked for the Great Northern Railway. The name Ephrata is derived from a biblical description of an orchard in the middle of the desert. It is also the ancient name for the town of Bethlehem.

The region was known at the turn of the century for the great herds of wild horses that roamed the land. Horse trading was an important element of the local economy, and Ephrata served as the staging area for the horse round-ups. The last "Grand Horse Round-up" was held in Ephrata in 1906. Ephrata then developed as a trade and service center for cattle and sheep ranches in the area until the construction of the Columbia Basin Reclamation Project.

In 1939, one of the state's longest runways was built at Ephrata Municipal Airport and served the U.S. Army Air Corps until 1945, when the field was turned into a commercial airport. The airport and hangars were used in Steven Spielberg's 1989 film Always, the final movie to feature Audrey Hepburn.

Ephrata was in the national spotlight in a segment on 60 Minutes II after the 2003 murder of Craig Sorger by Evan Savoie and Jake Eakin. The two accused were the youngest defendants in state history to be tried as adults.

Grant County Public Utility District has its headquarters located in Ephrata.

=== Columbia Basin Irrigation Project ===
Beginning in July 1918, several prominent Ephrata residents started the promotion of a plan to redirect waters of the Columbia River in order to irrigate the dry but fertile soils of the Big Bend country. Labeled "The Dam University", Ephrata residents persistently lobbied at the local, state, and federal levels to gather support for the project. Initial funding for the Grand Coulee Dam was through the Public Works Administration created under Franklin Roosevelt's promise of a "New Deal" in 1933. However, the irrigation waters would not be released as the nation focused on ending World War II during the 1940s. During this era, Grand Coulee Dam's main mission was to produce electricity for the Hanford Reservation and for aluminum manufacturing, vital to military aircraft production. When the war ended, the Project returned to its original mission, to irrigate the desert.

=== Population growth ===
The construction of the Irrigation Project and the military activity increased the population of Ephrata by a factor of eight between 1940 and 1960. As the federal projects phased out, the town experienced a population decrease of 22% between 1960 and 1975. The population stabilized between 1975 and 1982, with a slight decrease between 1980 and 1990. The city has seen steady population growth since 1990. The population was estimated to be 8,718 in 2024.

== Geography and climate ==
According to the United States Census Bureau, the city has a total area of 10.09 square miles (26.13 km^{2}), all of it land.

Ephrata has a semi-arid climate (Köppen BSk).

Climate data for Ephrata, Washington
Month	Jan	Feb	Mar	Apr	May	Jun	Jul	Aug	Sep	Oct	Nov	Dec	Year
Record high °F (°C)	61 (16)	65 (18)	75 (24)	94 (34)	101 (38)	116 (47)	109 (43)	115 (46)	106 (41)	86 (30)	72 (22)	63 (17)	116 (47)
Mean daily maximum °F (°C)	33.9 (1.1)	42.1 (5.6)	53.1 (11.7)	62.8 (17.1)	72.6 (22.6)	80.3 (26.8)	88.8 (31.6)	87.3 (30.7)	78.2 (25.7)	62.8 (17.1)	45.1 (7.3)	35.0 (1.7)	61.8 (16.6)
Mean daily minimum °F (°C)	21.3 (−5.9)	26.5 (−3.1)	32.4 (0.2)	38.8 (3.8)	47.5 (8.6)	55.0 (12.8)	61.5 (16.4)	59.9 (15.5)	51.4 (10.8)	40.0 (4.4)	30.0 (−1.1)	23.1 (−4.9)	40.6 (4.8)
Record low °F (°C)	−22 (−30)	−24 (−31)	2 (−17)	21 (−6)	28 (−2)	33 (1)	40 (4)	36 (2)	28 (−2)	8 (−13)	−15 (−26)	−21 (−29)	−24 (−31)
Average precipitation inches (mm)	0.91 (23)	0.68 (17)	0.68 (17)	0.51 (13)	0.60 (15)	0.60 (15)	0.32 (8.1)	0.23 (5.8)	0.32 (8.1)	0.53 (13)	0.98 (25)	1.16 (29)	7.53 (191)
Average snowfall inches (cm)	5.9 (15)	2.7 (6.9)	1.0 (2.5)	0 (0)	0 (0)	0 (0)	0 (0)	0 (0)	0 (0)	0 (0)	2.2 (5.6)	6.8 (17)	18.6 (47)
Source: Desert Research Institute

== Demographics ==
Historical population
Census	Pop.	Note	%±
1910	323		—
1920	628		94.4%
1930	516		−17.8%
1940	951		84.3%
1950	4,589		382.5%
1960	6,548		42.7%
1970	5,255		−19.7%
1980	5,359		2.0%
1990	5,349		−0.2%
2000	6,808		27.3%
2010	7,664		12.6%
2020	8,477		10.6%
2024 (est.)	8,718		2.8%
U.S. Decennial Census; 2020 Census

=== 2020 census ===
As of the 2020 census, Ephrata had a population of 8,477, a median age of 34.8 years, 28.3% of residents younger than 18, and 15.5% who were 65 years of age or older. For every 100 females there were 98.9 males, and for every 100 females age 18 and over there were 97.8 males overall.

92.7% of residents lived in urban areas, while 7.3% lived in rural areas.

There were 3,139 households in Ephrata, of which 36.9% included children under the age of 18, 46.2% were married-couple households, 17.7% were male householders with no spouse or partner present, and 27.2% were female householders with no spouse or partner present. About 27.1% of all households were made up of individuals and 13.1% had someone living alone who was 65 years of age or older.

There were 3,342 housing units, of which 6.1% were vacant; the homeowner vacancy rate was 1.7% and the rental vacancy rate was 7.1%.

Racial composition as of the 2020 census
Race	Number	Percent
White	6,029	71.1%
Black or African American	60	0.7%
American Indian and Alaska Native	161	1.9%
Asian	79	0.9%
Native Hawaiian and Other Pacific Islander	0	0.0%
Some other race	1,285	15.2%
Two or more races	863	10.2%
Hispanic or Latino (of any race)	2,230	26.3%

=== 2010 census ===
As of the 2010 census, there were 7,664 people, 2,856 households, and 1,915 families residing in the city. The population density was 759.6 inhabitants per square mile (293.3/km^{2}). There were 3,086 housing units at an average density of 305.8 per square mile (118.1/km^{2}). The racial makeup of the city was 84.1% White, 0.8% African American, 1.1% Native American, 1.3% Asian, 0.1% Pacific Islander, 9.5% from other races, and 3.1% from two or more races. Hispanic or Latino of any race were 16.7% of the population.

There were 2,856 households, of which 36.1% had children under the age of 18 living with them, 49.6% were married couples living together, 12.6% had a female householder with no husband present, 4.8% had a male householder with no wife present, and 32.9% were non-families. 28.7% of all households were made up of individuals, and 12.7% had someone living alone who was 65 years of age or older. The average household size was 2.57 and the average family size was 3.14.

The median age in the city was 34.7 years. 27.4% of residents were under the age of 18; 9.4% were between the ages of 18 and 24; 25% were from 25 to 44; 23.6% were from 45 to 64; and 14.6% were 65 years of age or older. The gender makeup of the city was 49.7% male and 50.3% female.

=== 2000 census ===
As of the 2000 census, there were 6,808 people, 2,561 households, and 1,776 families residing in the city. The population density was 683.0 people per square mile (263.6/km^{2}). There were 2,788 housing units at an average density of 279.7 per square mile (108.0/km^{2}). The racial makeup of the city was 90.64% White, 0.40% African American, 0.71% Native American, 0.72% Asian, 0.12% Pacific Islander, 5.32% from other races, and 2.10% from two or more races. Hispanic or Latino of any race were 10.30% of the population.

There were 2,561 households, out of which 35.8% had children under the age of 18 living with them, 54.5% were married couples living together, 10.7% had a female householder with no husband present, and 30.7% were non-families. 27.1% of all households were made up of individuals, and 13.7% had someone living alone who was 65 years of age or older. The average household size was 2.56 and the average family size was 3.09.

In the city, the age distribution of the population shows 28.9% under the age of 18, 8.0% from 18 to 24, 26.9% from 25 to 44, 20.1% from 45 to 64, and 16.1% who were 65 years of age or older. The median age was 36 years. For every 100 females, there were 97.6 males. For every 100 females age 18 and over, there were 94.5 males.

The median income for a household in the city was $35,060, and the median income for a family was $43,500. Males had a median income of $38,571 versus $26,320 for females. The per capita income for the city was $17,929. About 8.7% of families and 12.9% of the population were below the poverty line, including 16.0% of those under age 18 and 10.0% of those age 65 or over.

== Education ==
The city is served by the Ephrata School District.

Public elementary schools

- Columbia Ridge Elementary
- Grant Elementary

Public intermediate through high schools

- Parkway Intermediate School
- Ephrata Middle School
- Ephrata High School

Private schools

- New Life Christian School
- St. Rose Of Lima Catholic School

== Transportation ==
Ephrata is bisected by State Route 28, which travels west to Wenatchee and east to Soap Lake and Davenport. The highway also intersects State Route 282 in Ephrata, which connects to State Route 17 for onward travel towards Moses Lake. The city has a public use airport, Ephrata Municipal Airport, that is used for limited cargo operations and general aviation.

The BNSF Railway's Columbia River Subdivision travels through Ephrata and is primarily used for freight. These tracks also carry the Empire Builder, an Amtrak passenger train that stops in the city at Ephrata station. The Grant Transit Authority operates bus service in Ephrata that connects to Soap Lake and Moses Lake.

== Notable people ==
- Danica Dart, racing driver
- Ken Dow, professional American football player
- Thomas Jesse Drumheller, lawyer and sheep rancher
- Shane Johnson, actor
- Robert K. Preston, helicopter pilot and perpetrator of 1974 White House helicopter incident
- Bobby Rich, radio broadcaster
- Craig Sorger, murder victim
- Baxter Ward, TV news anchor
- Jim Wickwire, mountaineer and lawyer
