= Wenatchee Confluence State Park =

State park in Washington (state), United States

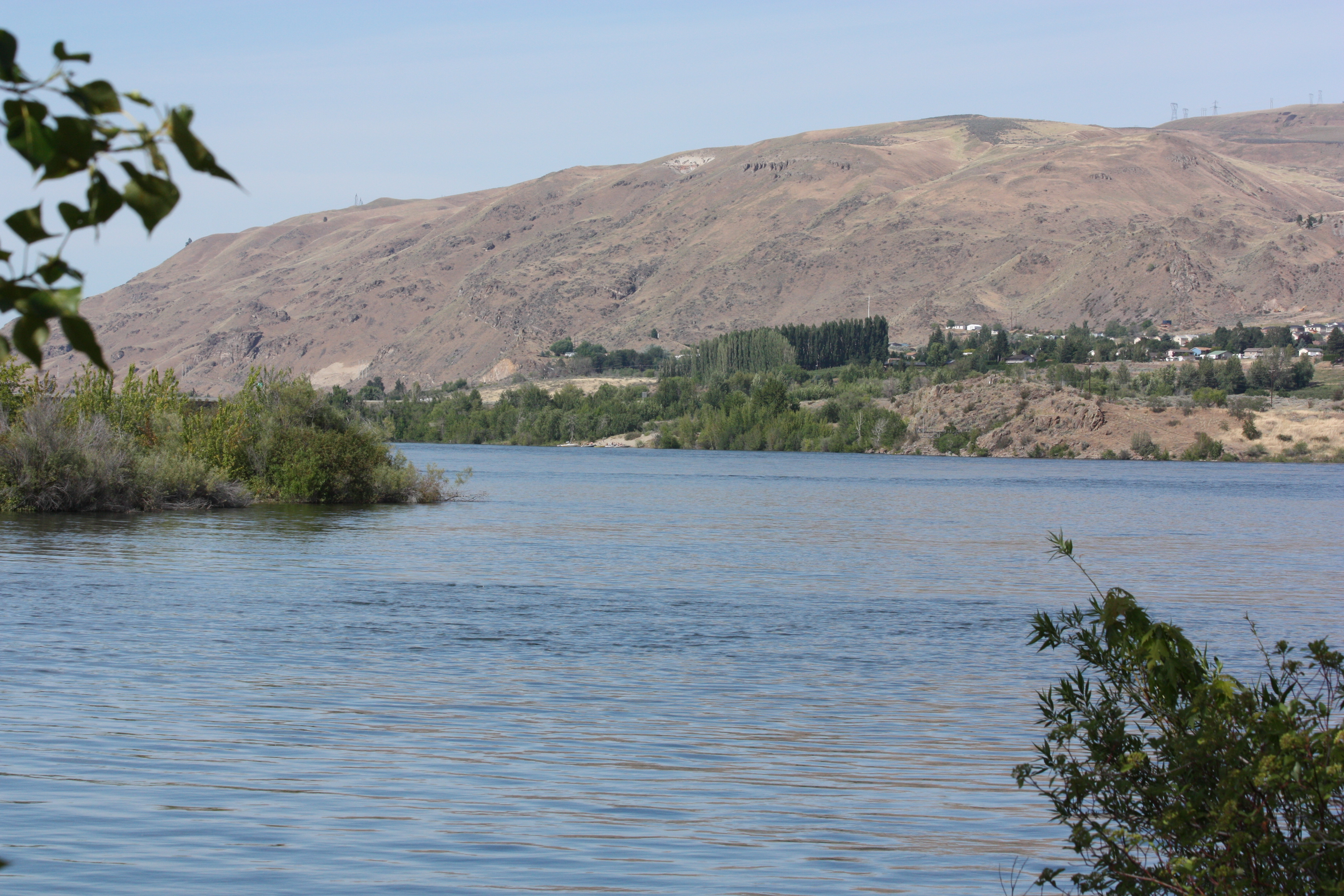
- Rock Island Pool of the Columbia River at its confluence with the Wenatchee River

- Location within Washington (state) Location within the United States
- Location: Chelan County, Washington, United States
- Coordinates: 47°27′32″N 120°19′34″W
- Area: 197 acres (80 ha)
- Established: 1990
- Administrator: Washington State Parks and Recreation Commission
- Website: Official website

Wenatchee Confluence State Park is a public recreation area and nature preserve at the north end of the city of Wenatchee in Chelan County, Washington. The state park consists of 197 acres (80 ha) spanning the Wenatchee River at its confluence with the Columbia River. The park is divided by the Wenatchee River into north and south sections that are connected by a footbridge. The north section, located in Sunnyslope, is suburban and recreational while the south section, located in West Wenatchee, is a man-made wetland area designated as the Horan Natural Area. The park is operated by the Washington State Parks and Recreation Commission under lease from the Chelan County Public Utility District, which owns the land. Park offerings include camping, boating, fishing, swimming, and various sports activities.

The Apple Capital Recreation Loop Trail runs through the park and connects it to downtown Wenatchee.
