= Cascade School District (Washington) =

Public school district in Washington, US

Coordinates: 47°36′N 120°40′W

The Cascade School District No. 228 is a public school district in Chelan County, Washington, United States. The district includes Dryden, Lake Wenatchee, Leavenworth, Peshastin, Plain and Winton. It covers 1,175 square miles (3,040 km^{2}) in the western portions of Chelan County. Four of the district schools are located in Leavenworth, while the fifth, an elementary school, is in Peshastin. The district office is located in Leavenworth, and the school board has five members elected from geographic districts. This school district also has a homeschool program called homelink, where students go to school for the first part of the day, and homeschools the rest.

As of 2023, the school district has an enrollment of 1,199 students—a decline from years prior to the COVID-19 pandemic. Cascade has 85 full-time teachers and a student–teacher ratio of 14.82 The largest school is Cascade High School with an enrollment of 535 students; it was rebuilt in 2019.

== Schools ==
- Cascade High School — grades 9–12
- Icicle River Middle School — grades 6–8
- Alpine Lakes Elementary School — grades 3–5
- Peshastin Dryden Elementary School — grades K–2
- Beaver Valley School — grades K–5

== Mascots ==
- Cascade High School - Kodiac
- Icicle River Middle School - Mountain Lion
- Alpine Lakes Elementary School - Eagles
- Peshastin Dryden Elementary - Cubs
- Beaver Valley School - Benjamin Beaver

== Principals ==
- Cascade High School - Mr. James Swanson
- Icicle River Middle School - Mr. Micheal Miller
- Alpine Lakes Elementary School - Dr. Kenny Renner-Singer
- Peshastin Dryden Elementary School - Mrs. Emily Ross
- Beaver Valley School - Dr. Kenny Renner-Singer
