= Sunnyslope, Washington =

- Census-designated place
- Location of Sunnyslope, Washington
- Coordinates: 47°29′30″N 120°21′40″W
- Country: United States
- State: Washington
- County: Chelan

Area
  - Total: 10.0 sq mi (26.0 km^{2})
  - Land: 9.6 sq mi (24.8 km^{2})
  - Water: 0.50 sq mi (1.3 km^{2})
- Elevation: 1,194 ft (364 m)

Population (2020)
  - Total: 4,041
  - Density: 340/sq mi (131.3/km^{2})
- Time zone: UTC-8 (Pacific (PST))
  - Summer (DST): UTC-7 (PDT)
- FIPS code: 53-68785
- GNIS feature ID: 2410032

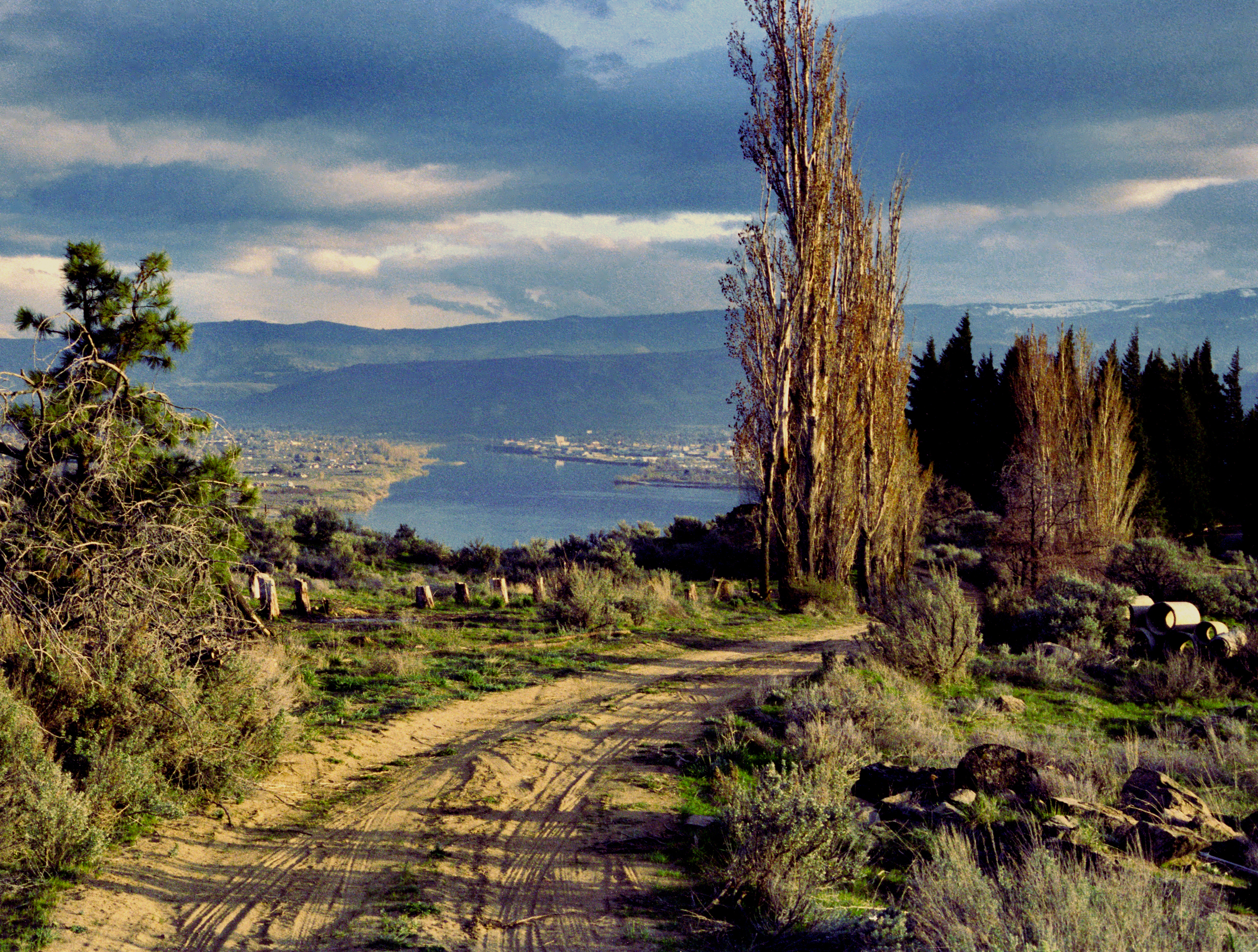
Columbia River and Wenatchee from near Ohme Gardens.

Sunnyslope is an unincorporated community and census-designated place (CDP) in Chelan County, Washington, United States. It is part of the Wenatchee–East Wenatchee Metropolitan Statistical Area. The population was 4,041 at the 2020 census, up from 3,252 at the 2010 census.

By per capita income, Sunnyslope ranks 53rd of 522 areas in the state of Washington to be ranked. It is also the highest rank achieved in Chelan County.

== Geography ==
Sunnyslope is located in southern Chelan County at the confluence of the Columbia River to the east and the Wenatchee River to the south. The city limits of Wenatchee are directly to the south of the river.

U.S. Route 2 and U.S. Route 97 pass through the southern part of Sunnyslope in the Wenatchee River valley, crossing the Columbia River into Douglas County via the Richard Odabashian Bridge. State Route 285 leads south from US 2/97 into Wenatchee.

According to the United States Census Bureau, the Sunnyslope CDP has a total area of 10.0 square miles (26.0 km^{2}), of which 9.6 square miles (24.8 km^{2}) is land and 0.50 square miles (1.3 km^{2}), or 4.85%, is water.

The headquarters of the Okanogan–Wenatchee National Forest, administered by the United States Forest Service, is located in Sunnyslope.

Ohme Gardens is an alpine garden located in Sunnyslope, on a hill overlooking the community.

== Olds Station ==
The area south of US 2/97 near the confluence but above the Wenatchee River and Sleepy Hollow areas are commonly known and signed as "Olds Station", which is referenced in the former name of the Richard Odabashian Bridge which carries US 2/97 and the Apple Capital Recreation Loop Trail over the Columbia River. Olds Station was built by the Great Northern Railroad in 1914, so named because it was built on land donated from the Olds Company, a fruit orchard business run by Alfred J. Olds and his three sons.

== Public services ==
Sunnyslope receives most public services from Chelan County. It is under the jurisdiction of Chelan county sheriff's department, and is headquarters seat of Chelan County fire district 1. Utility services including electricity, water, and fiber optic communication lines are provided by the Chelan County Public Utility District Number 1.

Sunnyslope is served by Wenatchee School District #246; elementary students attend Sunnyslope Elementary School on School Street at Peters Street West. Secondary students attend Foothills Middle School and then Wenatchee High School.

Link Transit serves Sunnyslope through a transfer station at the Food Pavilion Plaza at Easy Street and US 2/97, and a transit route along Easy Street.

== Demographics ==
Historical population
Census	Pop.	Note	%±
1980	1,485		—
1990	1,907		28.4%
2000	2,521		32.2%
2010	3,252		29.0%
2020	4,041		24.3%
U.S. Decennial Census; 1970 1980 1990; 2000 2010

As of the census of 2000, there were 2,521 people, 915 households, and 756 families residing in the CDP. The population density was 262.1 people per square mile (101.2/km^{2}). There were 952 housing units at an average density of 99.0/sq mi (38.2/km^{2}). The racial makeup of the CDP was 92.19% White, 0.16% African American, 0.44% Native American, 1.31% Asian, 0.12% Pacific Islander, 3.41% from other races, and 2.38% from two or more races. Hispanic or Latino of any race were 6.62% of the population.

There were 915 households, out of which 37.4% had children under the age of 18 living with them, 74.5% were married couples living together, 5.4% had a female householder with no husband present, and 17.3% were non-families. 13.4% of all households were made up of individuals, and 6.0% had someone living alone who was 65 years of age or older. The average household size was 2.76 and the average family size was 3.02.

In the CDP, the age distribution of the population shows 27.4% under the age of 18, 4.6% from 18 to 24, 24.0% from 25 to 44, 29.6% from 45 to 64, and 14.3% who were 65 years of age or older. The median age was 42 years. For every 100 females, there were 99.0 males. For every 100 females age 18 and over, there were 97.8 males.

The median income for a household in the CDP was $68,224, and the median income for a family was $71,447. Males had a median income of $55,156 versus $36,250 for females. The per capita income for the CDP was $28,024. About 3.9% of families and 5.5% of the population were below the poverty line, including 7.8% of those under age 18 and 6.1% of those age 65 or over.
