= Cascade School District =

Cascade School District may refer to:

- Cascade School District, Idaho
- Cascade School District (Oregon)
- Cascade School District, Washington
