= Columbia River Bridge (Wenatchee, Washington) =

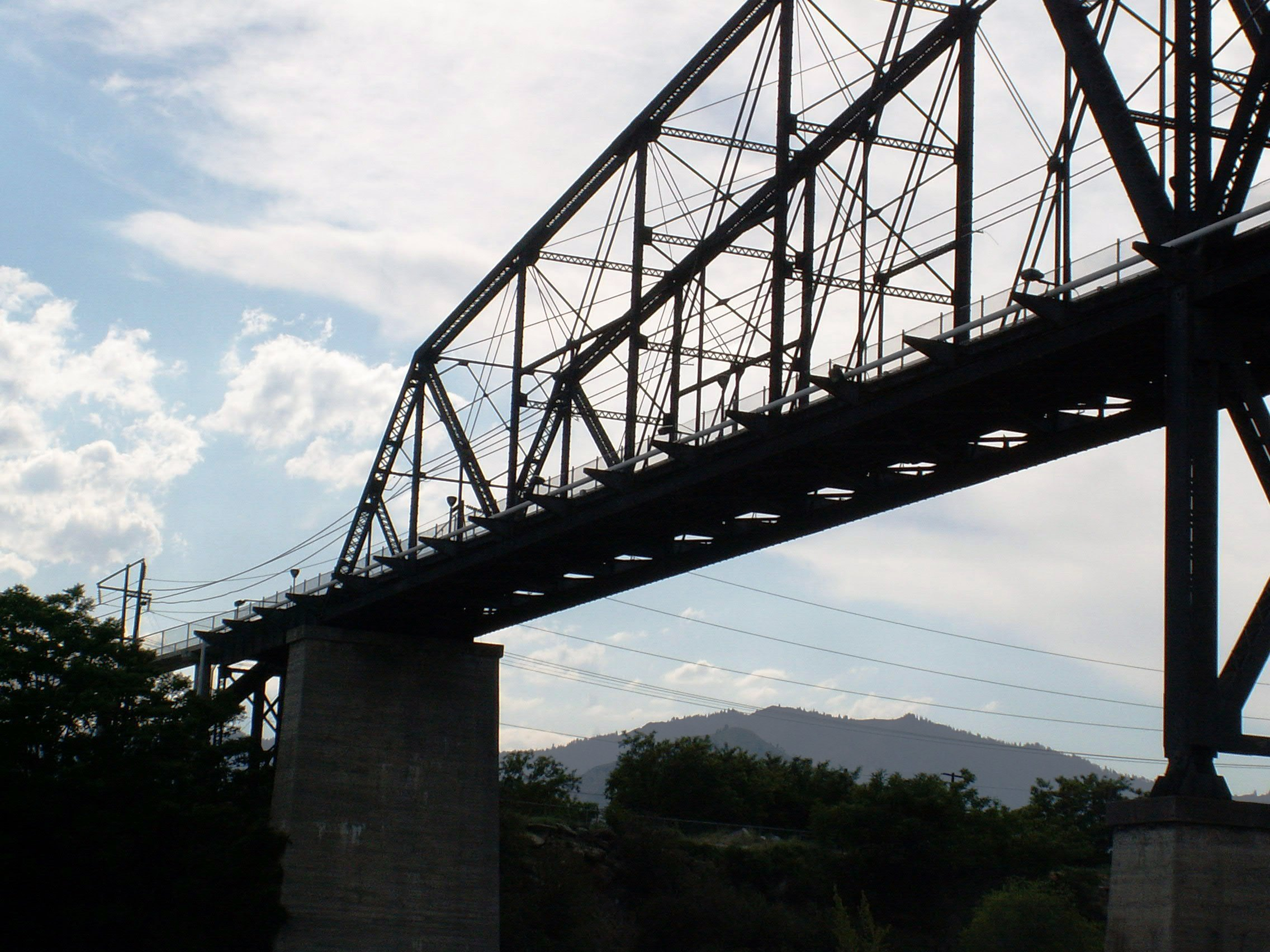
- Coordinates: 47°24′53″N 120°17′50″W
- Crosses: Columbia River
- Locale: East Wenatchee, Washington / West Wenatchee, Washington
- Maintained by: Wenatchee Reclamation District, State of Washington

Characteristics
- Design: Pin-connected cantilever through truss
- Total length: 1,600 feet (490 m)
- Longest span: 520 feet (160 m)
- Clearance below: 85 feet (26 m)

History
- Opened: 1908
- Replaces: Ferry
- Columbia River Bridge
- U.S. National Register of Historic Places
- Nearest city: Wenatchee, Washington
- Area: less than one acre
- Built by: Washington Bridge Company
- MPS: Historic Bridges/Tunnels in Washington State TR
- NRHP reference No.: 82004198
- Added to NRHP: July 16, 1982

Location
- Interactive map of Columbia River Bridge

The Columbia River Bridge at Wenatchee, Washington, also known as the Old Wenatchee Bridge and W.T. Clark Pipeline Bridge was built by the Washington Bridge Company in 1908, primarily as a means to carry irrigation water pipelines across the Columbia River. It was the first road bridge over the Columbia south of Canada. The bridge is a pin-connected cantilever truss, 1,600 feet (490 m) long, with one 200-foot (61 m) Pratt truss between two 160-foot (49 m) cantilever arms, with 240-foot (73 m) side arms and a 60 feet (18 m) girder span. The bridge was purchased by the Washington highway department for $182,000 for highway use. As originally built, the bridge carried a 20.5-foot (6.2 m) wide timber roadway, with additional ability to carry a street railway. However, the east approach to the bridge was built at a 6% grade, limiting its potential.

The bridge was replaced in 1950 by the Senator George Sellar Bridge. The next year the Wenatchee Reclamation District bought the bridge for $1.00, moving the pipes from outside the truss to within. The bridge was opened to foot traffic. In 2007 concerns were raised about the bridge's ability to sustain foot traffic. Repairs were made in 2010.

The bridge currently carries pedestrian and bicycle traffic as part of the Apple Capital Recreation Loop Trail. It was placed on the National Register of Historic Places on July 16, 1982. The bridge was renamed for irrigation canal builder William T. Clark in 2023.

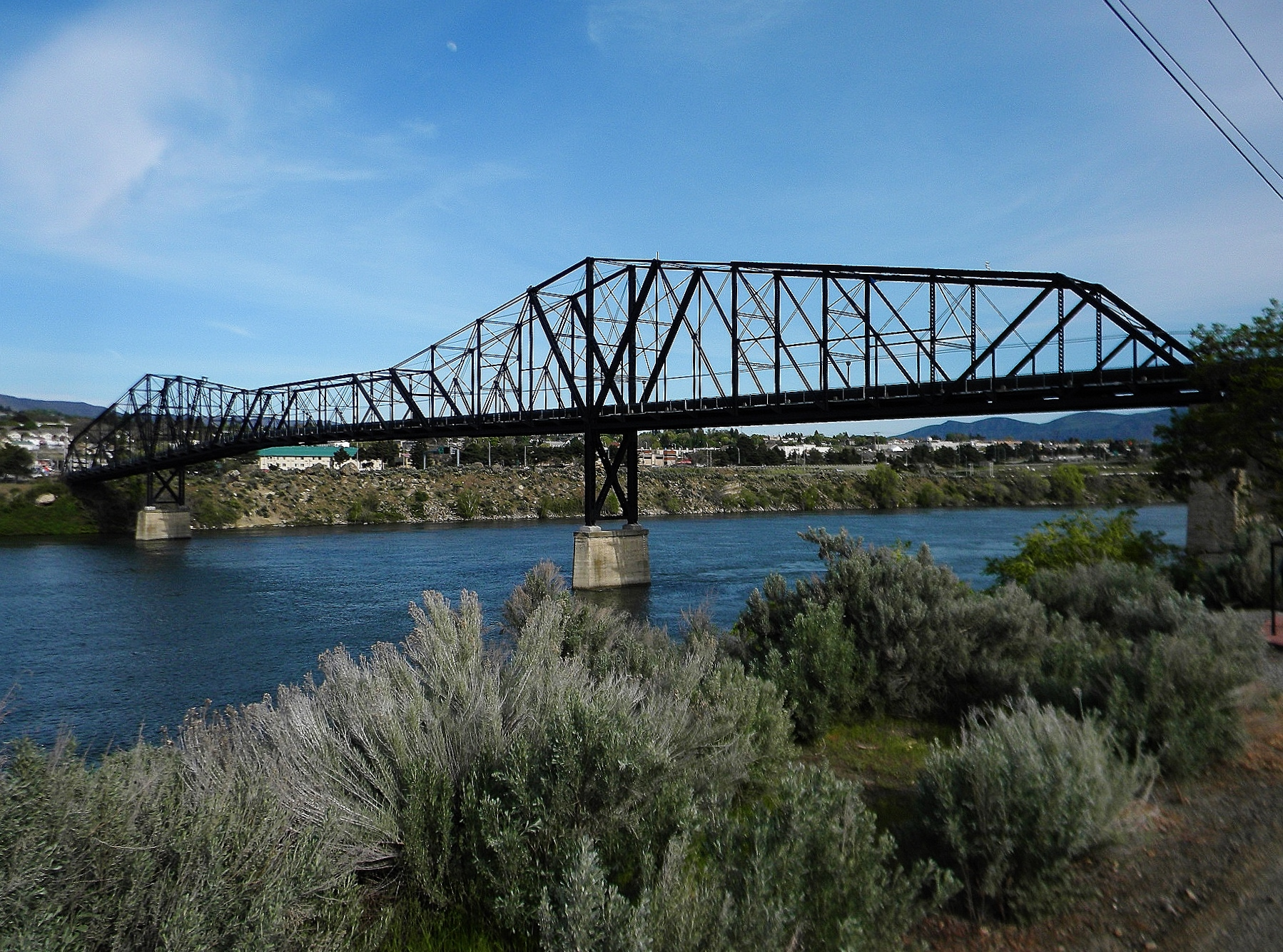
Bridge in 2016
