= Peshastin, Washington =

Unincorporated community in Washington, US

- Unincorporated community
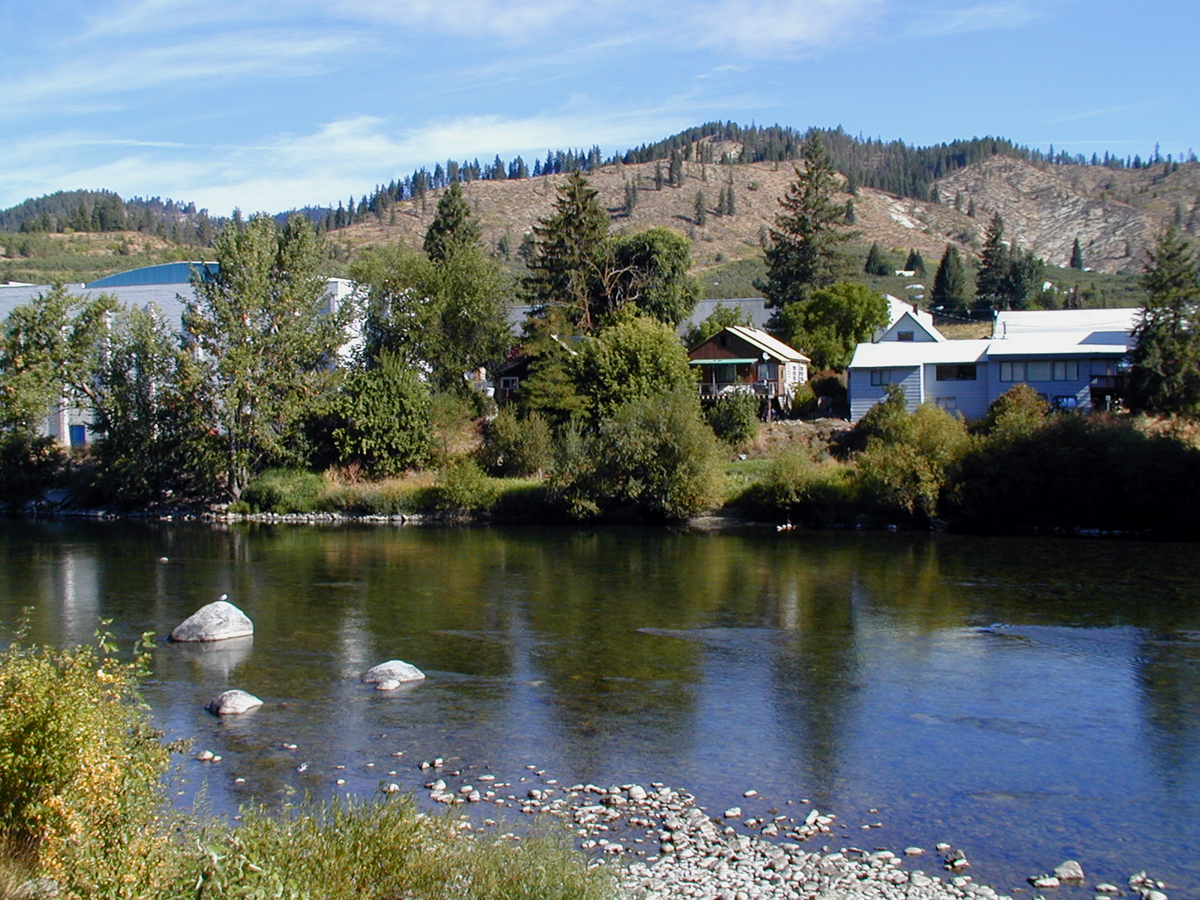
- Peshastin from the Wenatchee River

- Location within Washington (state)
- Coordinates: 47°34′14.4″N 120°36′14.3″W
- Country: United States
- State: Washington
- County: Chelan
- Elevation: 1,034 ft (315 m)
- Time zone: UTC-8 (Pacific (PST))
  - Summer (DST): UTC-7 (PDT)
- ZIP code: 98847
- Area code: 509
- GNIS feature ID: 1524346

Peshastin is a small unincorporated community in Chelan County, Washington, United States. The community's roots are found in the "Peshastin Ditch" dug by pioneers beginning in 1889. This ditch was an important part of the overall irrigation system in the area, delivering water to the orchards on the slopes above Cashmere. The town was first platted in the early 1890s by two brothers, J. Q. Gilbert and A. C. Gilbert. It is also noted on an 1895 map of the area, indicating it was in existence by then.

Today, Peshastin is still a small community with one elementary school and a library.

== Geography ==
Peshastin is located in the valley of the Wenatchee River with the communities of Leavenworth upstream and Dryden downstream. The valley floor is located at approximately 1,034 feet above sea level, with peaks rising to over 2,000 feet within a mile of Peshastin on both sides of the river.

U.S. Route 2 passes Peshastin on the south side of the river, connecting the community with the regional center of Wenatchee where the Wenatchee River meets the Columbia River, about 19 miles by road to the southeast. U.S. 2 has a junction with U.S. Route 97 about a mile southeast of Peshastin.
