= Wenatchee Heights, Washington =

Unincorporated community in Washington, United States

- Unincorporated community
- Location within the state of Washington
- Coordinates: 47°21′35.5″N 120°17′14.3″W
- Country: United States
- State: Washington
- County: Chelan
- Elevation: 1,870 ft (570 m)
- Time zone: UTC-8 (Pacific (PST))
  - Summer (DST): UTC-7 (PDT)
- ZIP codes: 98801
- FIPS code: 53007
- GNIS feature ID: 1527899

Wenatchee Heights is an unincorporated community in Chelan County, Washington, United States. Wentachee Heights is assigned the ZIP code 98801.

Wenatchee Heights is on the Wenatchee Heights U.S. Geological Survey Map.
