= Winton, Washington =

Unincorporated community in Washington, United States

- Unincorporated community
- Location within the state of Washington
- Coordinates: 47°44′07″N 120°44′28″W
- Country: United States
- State: Washington
- County: Chelan
- Elevation: 2,077 ft (633 m)
- Time zone: UTC-8 (Pacific (PST))
  - Summer (DST): UTC-7 (PDT)
- ZIP codes: 98826
- FIPS code: 53007
- GNIS feature ID: 1528263

Winton, Washington is an unincorporated community close to Lake Wenatchee and surrounded by the Wenatchee National Forest. It is in Chelan County in the state of Washington. Winton belongs to the Cascade School District, based in Leavenworth, Washington, approximately 10 mi (16 km) to the south.

Both U.S. Route 2 and the BNSF Scenic Subdivision pass through Winton.
