= Apple Capital Recreation Loop Trail =

Urban bicycle and pedestrian trail in the United States

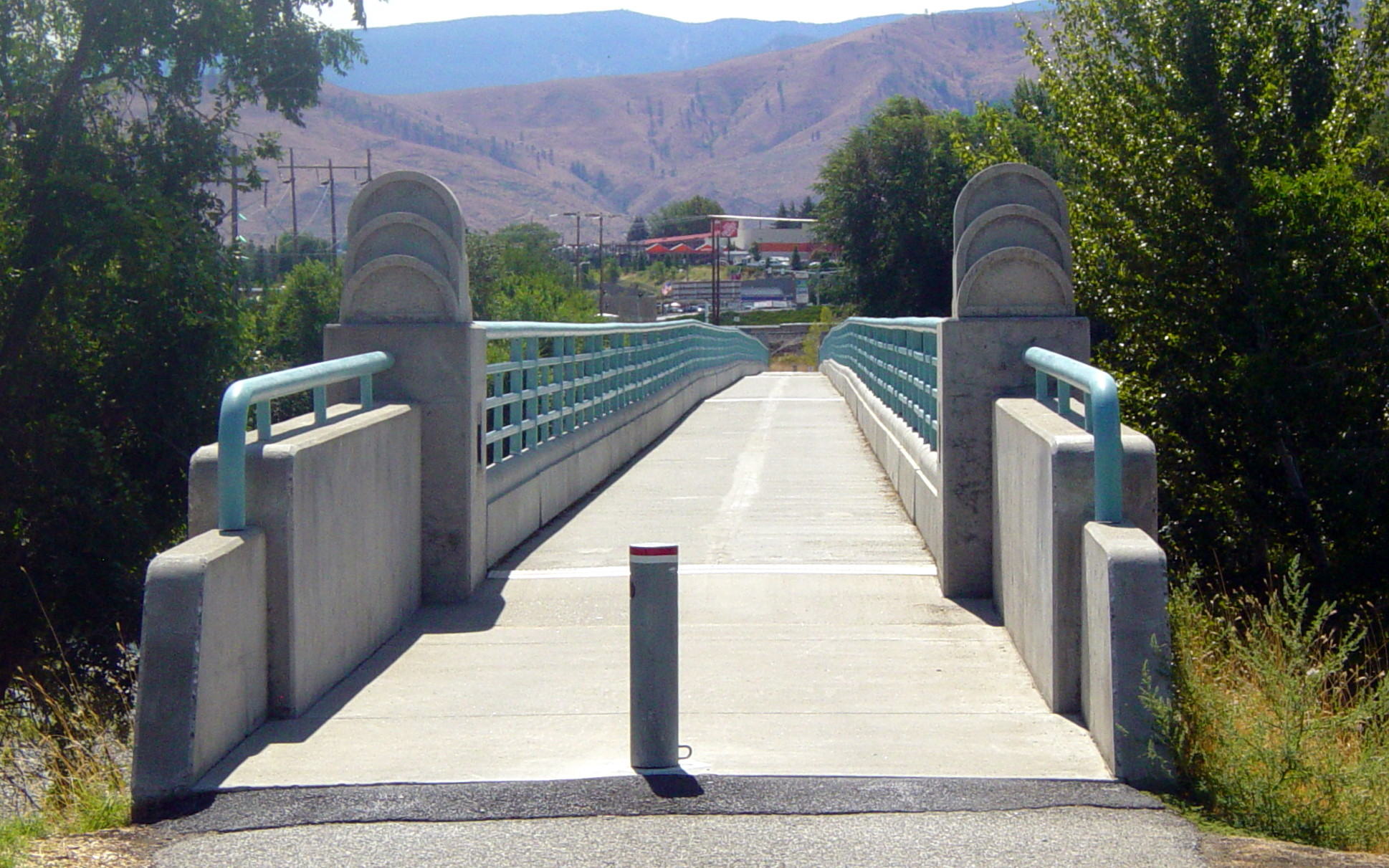
- A bridge carrying the trail over the Wenatchee River
- Length: 10 miles (16 km)
- Location: Wenatchee, Washington
- Established: 1995
- Use: Cycling, walking, skateboarding, snowshoeing (seasonal)
- Surface: Asphalt or concrete
Trail map

The Apple Capital Recreation Loop Trail is an urban bicycle and pedestrian trail in Wenatchee, Washington, United States. It follows the west and east shores of the Columbia River for 10 miles (16 km) and was completed in 1995.

== Route ==
The trail runs counterclockwise from the foot of 9th Street at Wenatchee Riverfront Park and follows the west bank of the Columbia River along Worthen Street. It crosses the river on the historic Columbia River Bridge into East Wenatchee and joins a 2.2-mile (3.5 km) branch that travels southeast towards Rock Island Hydro Park. The trail continues north on the river's east bank, passing through the Porter's Pond Natural Area and intersecting two trailheads located a few blocks west of State Route 28 before reaching a junction with the Rocky Reach Trail. It then crosses the Columbia River on the south side of the Richard Odabashian Bridge, which also carries U.S. Route 2 and U.S. Route 97, and turns south to enter Wenatchee Confluence State Park. The trail crosses the Wenatchee River and re-enters Wenatchee, passing through Walla Walla Point Park and terminating at Riverfront Park.

The 10 miles (16 km) loop trail was reportedly the longest in Washington state as of 2006, and was largely developed by the Chelan County Public Utility District as part of hydroelectric dam mitigation. The trail is typically used by pedestrians, cyclists, and skateboarders, but also functions as a cross-country skiing and snowshoeing route during the wintertime. It has views of the Columbia and Wenatchee rivers, as well as the surrounding mountains and hills.

== History ==
The riverside loop trail was conceived in the 1980s by the Chelan County Public Utility District as part of Exhibit R, an environmental mitigation program required by federal authorities before renewing the agency's licenses to operate hydroelectric dams on the Columbia River. The Wenatchee side was completed in 1990.

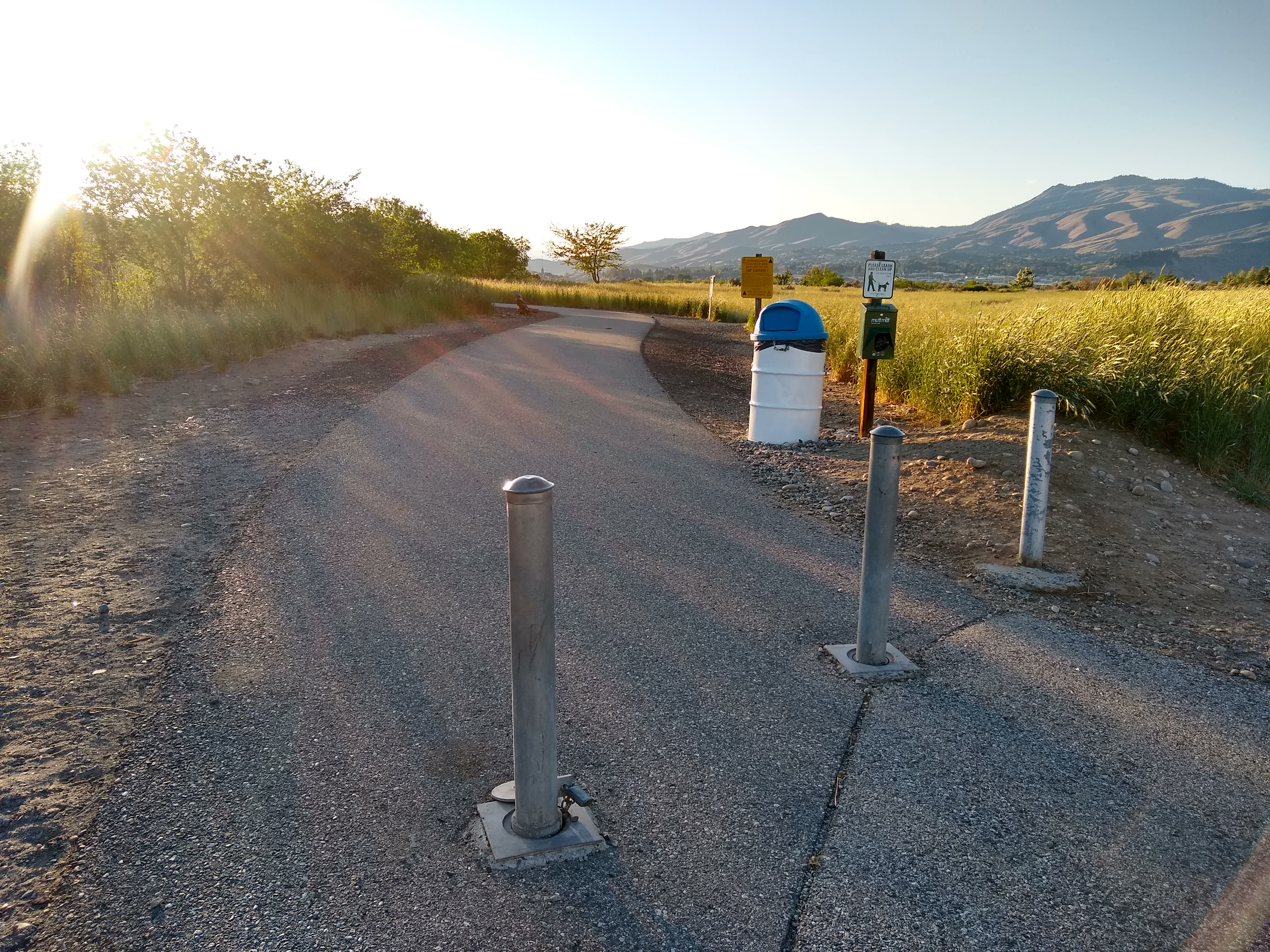
River Drive entrance to the Apple Capital Recreation Loop Trail in East Wenatchee

The Eastside trail, named the Apple Capital Recreation Loop, was funded by donations from local businesses and grants from the state government and began construction in April 1993. The trail's Eastside portion was completed in October 1994, and its link to the west side was finished in May 1995. The section within East Wenatchee was also designated as the Russell T. Congdon Memorial Trail, named for a major donor. A major renovation of the trail began in 2008 and was completed in 2013, rebuilding curves, adding mile markers, and building new bridges and undercrossings at the north end.

The Hydro Park branch to Rock Island was constructed and paved in 2002. The trail network was extended north in 2015 with the opening of the Rocky Reach Trail, which travels 5 miles (8.0 km) from the east end of the Richard Odabashian Bridge to Lincoln Rock State Park.
