= Ardenvoir, Washington =

Unincorporated community in Washington, United States

- Unincorporated community
- Location within Washington (state)
- Coordinates: 47°44′44″N 120°22′02″W
- Country: United States
- State: Washington
- County: Chelan
- Elevation: 1,273 ft (388 m)
- Time zone: UTC-8 (Pacific (PST))
  - Summer (DST): UTC-7 (PDT)
- ZIP code: 98811
- Area code: 509
- GNIS feature ID: 1515943

Ardenvoir (/ˈɑːrdənvɔːr/) is an unincorporated community in Chelan County, Washington, United States. Ardenvoir is 9 miles (14 km) west-northwest of Entiat. Ardenvoir has a post office with ZIP code 98811.

== Geography ==
Ardenvoir is located in the steep, thin valley of the Entiat River, which passes through the community. The Mad River enters the Entiat River from the west at Ardenvoir. The Entiat Valley runs in a north-northwest to south-southeast direction in this area. Peaks in the immediate vicinity of the community rise more than 2,000 feet above the valley floor. The community is 11.5 miles from the city of Entiat, where the Entiat River joins the Columbia River. Chelan County Highway 19 connects the community with the Entiat and the outside world.

== Climate ==
This climatic region is typified by large seasonal temperature differences, with warm to hot (and often humid) summers and cold (sometimes severely cold) winters. According to the Köppen Climate Classification system, Ardenvoir has a humid continental climate, abbreviated "Dfb" on climate maps.

== History ==
Ardenvoir began as a logging/mining camp and was built up during the Civilian Conservation Corps era. Not many people live in the area now and mostly rural homes can be found. Coopers General Store is the only storefront in the area (also where the post office is located).
