= Wenatchee Dome =

Coordinates: 47°23′46″N 120°19′29″W

The Wenatchee Dome is a large, igneous intrusion located on the southern end of Miller Street in Wenatchee, Washington.

The Wenatchee Dome was the location of the Cannon-Asamera gold mining operation. The mine closed in the 1990s and all mining operations ended by 1994. The mine entrance on the north of the dome was sealed by concrete. Much of the mine activities included a strip mine in Dry Gulch to the southwest of the dome. The mining company worked to restore the area.
