= Dryden, Washington =

Unincorporated community in Washington, United States

- Unincorporated community
- Location within Washington (state)
- Coordinates: 47°32′28″N 120°33′39″W
- Country: United States
- State: Washington
- County: Chelan
- Elevation: 968 ft (295 m)

Population (2010)
  - Total: 519
- Time zone: UTC-8 (Pacific (PST))
  - Summer (DST): UTC-7 (PDT)
- ZIP code: 98821
- Area code: 509
- GNIS feature ID: 1518980

Dryden is a small unincorporated community in Chelan County, Washington, United States. It is situated along the Wenatchee River in the fertile Wenatchee Valley between the towns of Cashmere and Leavenworth. The community serves as a supply and shipping point for local farms and orchards.

Dryden is part of the Wenatchee–East Wenatchee Metropolitan Statistical Area.

According to data from the 2010 census, the total population in the Dryden ZIP code was 519 persons across 319 households. Dryden itself is not incorporated, and is not tracked by the Census.

== History ==
The area that is now Dryden was historically called Pine Flat by local ranchers because of the large Pine trees growing in the area. In the 1890s these trees were logged and floated down the Wenatchee River to be milled, leaving the land barren and dry. Also in 1892, the Great Northern Railway built its main line through the valley but no town or station were established at that time. Only the name Dryden was assigned to the area by the railroad in honor of Canadian horticulturist and Minister of Agriculture John Dryden who toured with Great Northern Railway president James J. Hill. Native American homesteaders Dan and Topen Nason were the first to see any value in the then undeveloped area and filed a land claim in 1904. Other settlers soon followed with the intent of planting orchards, specifically apple trees. The land was cut into small tracts which were quickly sold.

The Dryden Fruit Growers Union was incorporated in 1909 and the first fruit warehouse was constructed. That same year 18 railroad cars of apples were shipped out. The next year a post office was established for the small settlement growing by the warehouse. Orchard planting greatly escalated with the completion of the Icicle Canal in 1913. By 1915, the railroad had established a station at Dryden and by 1919, the town had its own bank and school as well as two churches. Currently, Dryden retains a post office, a general store, a tienda, and a small cafe called the Take A Break Cafe which has been a cafe consistently since the early 1930s.

== Geography ==
Dryden is located in the Wenatchee Valley along the Wenatchee River at an elevation of 968 feet above sea level. The valley is very thin in this area, with the slopes surrounding the community rising to heights above 2,400 feet within two miles on either side of Dryden. U.S. Route 2 and U.S. Route 97 run concurrently through Dryden and split into separate roads about two miles up the valley from the community. Dryden is three miles by highway from the community of Peshastin to the northwest, and 5 miles by highway from the community of Cashmere to the southeast.

== Climate ==
This climatic region is typified by large seasonal temperature differences, with warm to hot (and often humid) summers and cold (sometimes severely cold) winters. According to the Köppen Climate Classification system, Dryden has a humid continental climate, abbreviated "Dfb" on climate maps.
