= Richard Odabashian Bridge =

Highway bridge in Wenatchee, Washington, US

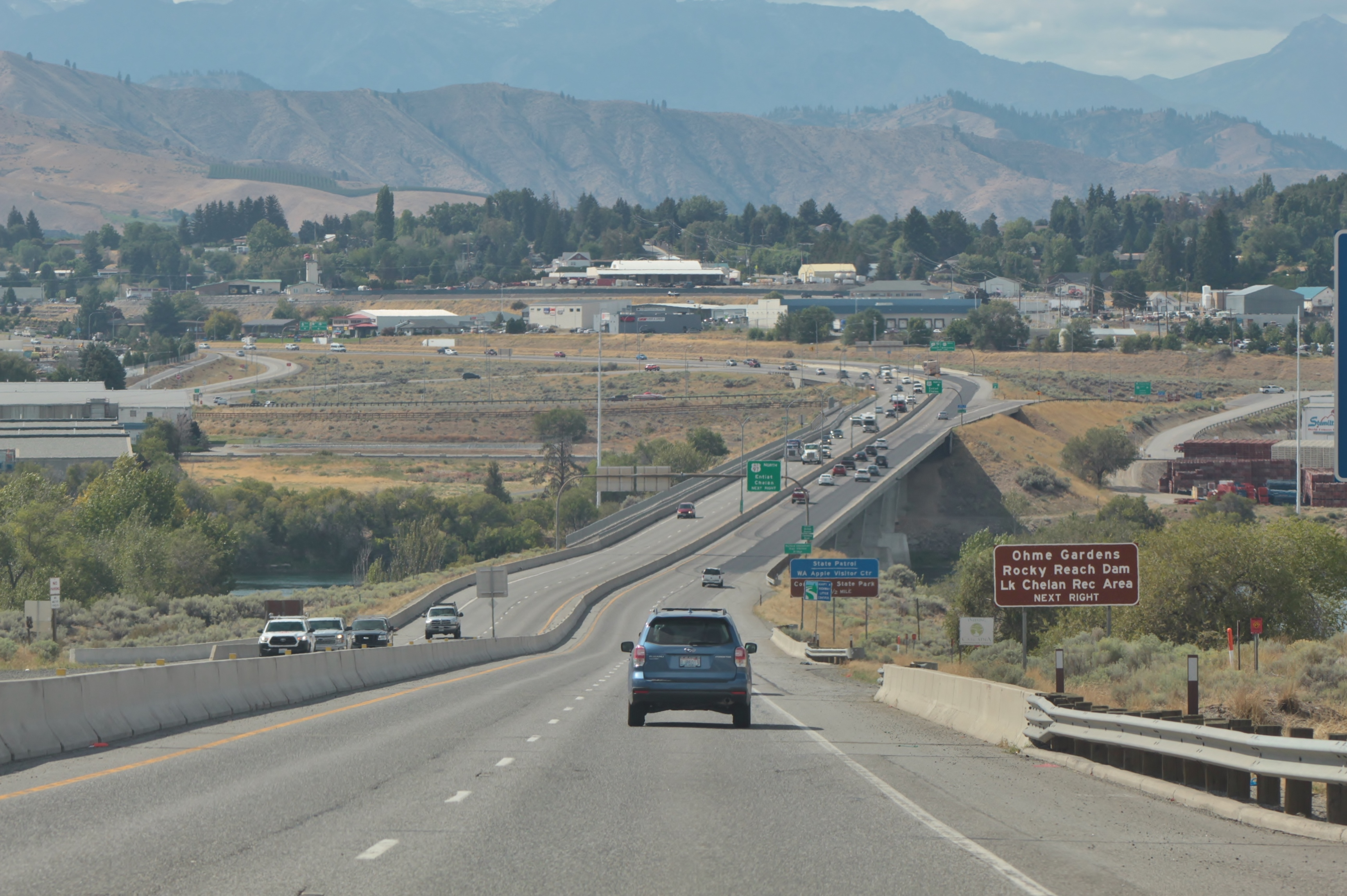
- Coordinates: 47°28′16″N 120°19′01″W
- Carries: US 2 / US 97
- Crosses: Columbia River
- Locale: Wenatchee, Washington, US
- Other name(s): Olds Station Bridge
- Owner: Washington State Department of Transportation
- Maintained by: Washington State Department of Transportation
- National Bridge Inventory: 0009102A0000000

Characteristics
- Design: Box girder bridge
- Material: Concrete
- Total length: 1,400 feet (430 m)
- Width: 80 feet (24 m)
- No. of spans: 3

History
- Construction start: 1971
- Opened: September 5, 1975

The Richard Odabashian Bridge, formerly the Olds Station Bridge, is a box girder bridge crossing the Columbia River in Wenatchee, Washington, United States. It carries four lanes of U.S. Route 2 (US 2) and US 97, as well as a bicycle and pedestrian pathway that is part of the Apple Capital Recreation Loop Trail. The 1,400-foot (430 m) bridge opened in 1975 and is located north of downtown Wenatchee at Olds Station.

== History ==
A bridge crossing the Columbia River in Sunnyslope north of Wenatchee had been proposed since the 1960s to bypass a section of US 2 through downtown Wenatchee that crossed the Columbia River on the Senator George Sellar Bridge. Early proposals favored a bridge at either Walla Walla Point in northern Wenatchee or Olds Station on the north side of the Wenatchee River; the latter option won out. Construction began in 1971 and was completed in 1975, including a narrow bicycle/pedestrian trail and two highway lanes, which were later expanded to four. The bridge was dedicated by 300 people, including local mayors and state highway officials, on September 5, 1975. US 2 was re-routed onto the bridge and the old alignment later became State Route 285.

The bridge was renamed in May 1991 for Richard Odabashian, a state transportation commissioner from Cashmere. The pedestrian trail on the bridge was originally 5 feet (1.5 m) wide until it was expanded to 10 feet (3.0 m) in 2001, to eliminate a major bottleneck on the Apple Capital Recreation Loop Trail and allow bicycles to pass.
