= USS Chelan County =

1944 LST-542-class tank landing ship

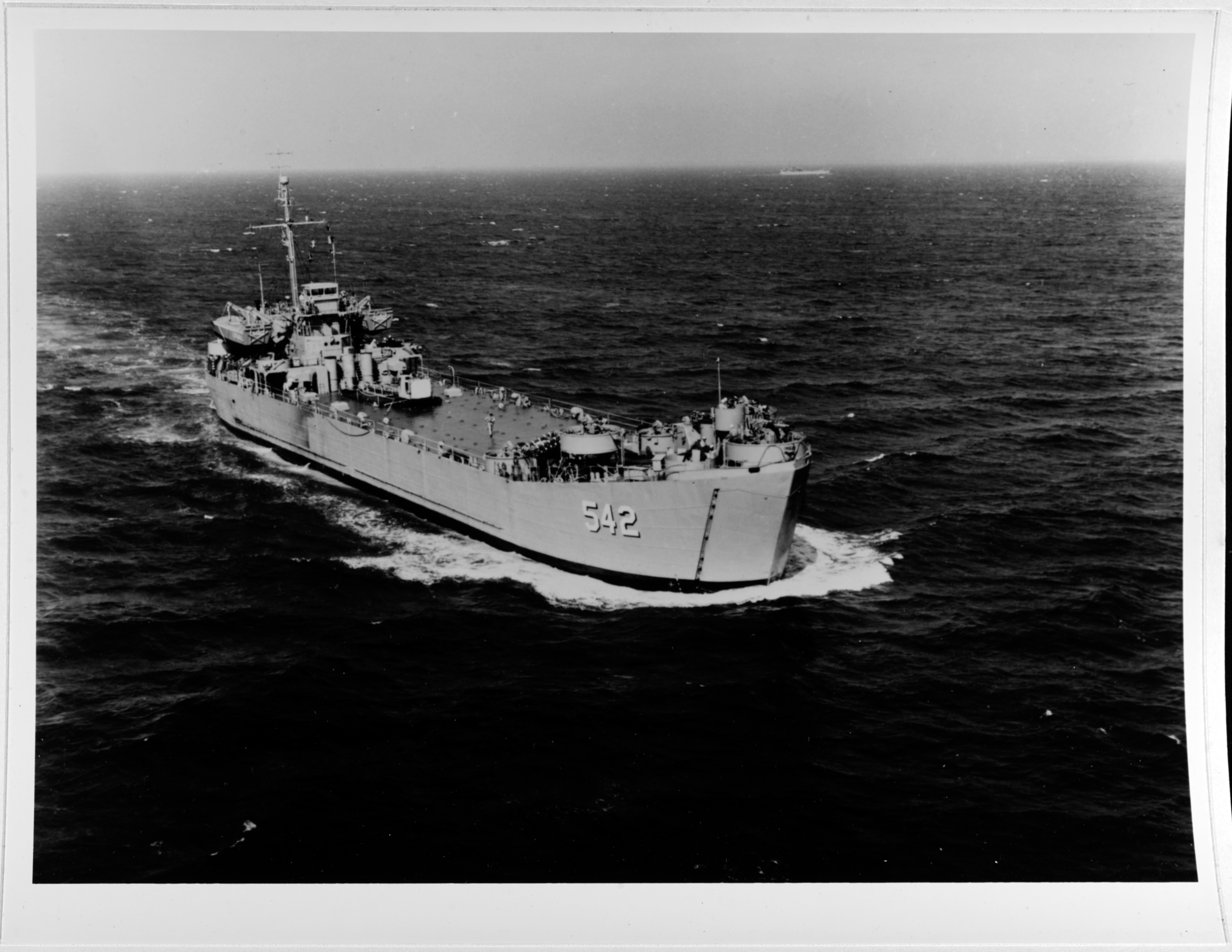
- LST-542 underway c. 1950

History

United States
- Name: USS LST-542, later USS Chelan County
- Namesake: Chelan County, Washington
- Builder: Missouri Valley Bridge and Iron Company, Evansville, Indiana
- Laid down: 29 November 1943
- Launched: 28 January 1944
- Commissioned: 29 February 1944
- Decommissioned: 1956
- Renamed: USS Chelan County (LST-542), 1 July 1955
- Stricken: 1 November 1959
- Honours and awards: 1 battle star (World War II)

General characteristics
- Class & type: LST-542-class tank landing ship
- Displacement: 1,625 long tons (1,651 t) light; 4,080 long tons (4,145 t) full
- Length: 328 ft (100 m)
- Beam: 50 ft (15 m)
- Draft: Unloaded : 2 ft 4 in (0.71 m) forward; 7 ft 6 in (2.29 m) aft; Loaded : 8 ft 2 in (2.49 m) forward; 14 ft 1 in (4.29 m) aft
- Propulsion: 2 × General Motors 12-567 diesel engines, two shafts, twin rudders
- Speed: 12 knots (22 km/h; 14 mph)
- Boats & landing craft carried: 4 LCVPs
- Troops: 16 officers, 147 enlisted men
- Complement: 7 officers, 104 enlisted men
- Armament: 2 × twin 40 mm gun mounts w/Mk.51 directors; 4 × single 40 mm gun mounts; 12 × single 20 mm gun mounts

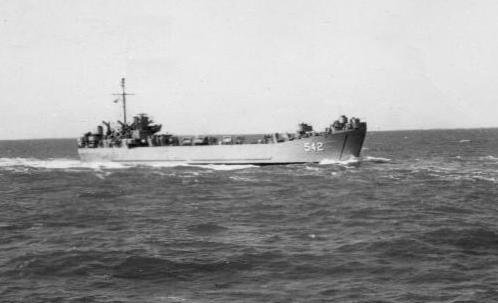
LST-542 underway c. 1951

USS LST–542 was the lead ship of her class of tank landing ships built for the United States Navy during World War II. She was later named USS Chelan County (LST-542) for the county in Washington, the only U.S. Naval vessel to bear the name. The LST-542-class was built with a water-distilling plant and heavier armament than the earlier LST-1 class, which slightly decreased their payload.

LST-542 was laid down on 29 November 1943 at Evansville, Indiana by the Missouri Valley Bridge & Iron Company; launched on 28 January 1944; sponsored by Mrs. Robert C. Dean; and commissioned on 29 February 1944.

== Service history ==
During World War II, LST-542 was assigned to the European Theater and participated in the invasion of Normandy in June 1944. Following the war, LST-542 saw service as a part of the Amphibious Force, U.S. Atlantic Fleet.

She was named Chelan County (LST-542) on 1 July 1955. The ship was decommissioned in 1956 and struck from the Naval Vessel Register on 1 November 1959.

LST-542 earned one battle star for World War II service.

== See also ==
- List of United States Navy LSTs
