= Washington State Apple Blossom Festival =

Spring festival held in Wenatchee, WA

Coordinates: 47°25′30″N 120°19′30″W

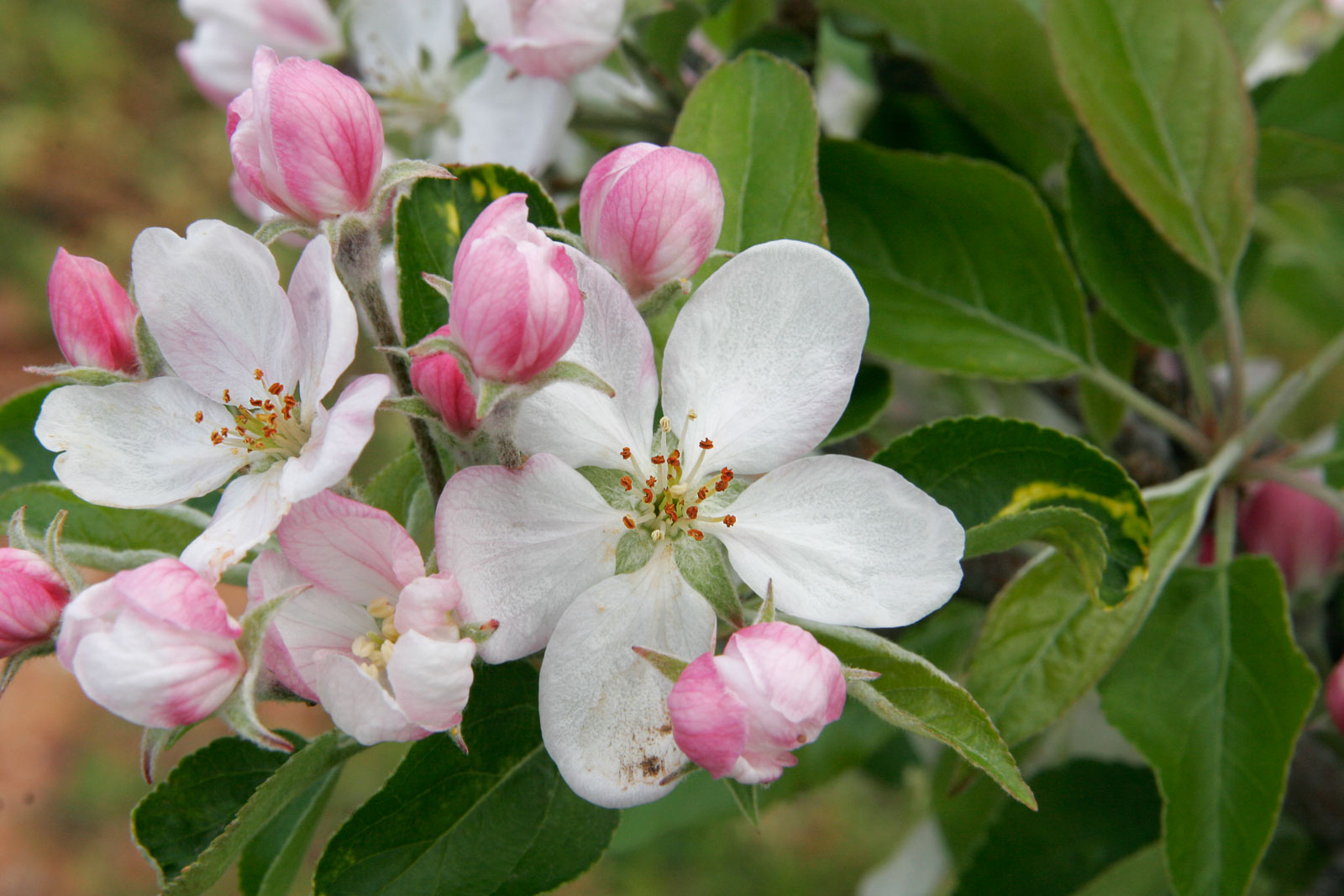
- Apple blossoms in early spring
- Begins: late April
- Ends: early May
- Frequency: annual
- Location: Wenatchee, Washington
- Inaugurated: 1920
- Attendance: 100,000 (2011)
- Website: appleblossoms.org

The Washington State Apple Blossom Festival is a festival held annually in Wenatchee, Washington from the last weekend in April to the first weekend in May. The festival, first held in 1920, has grown from a one-day event to an eleven-day affair including a carnival, golf tournament, food fair, multiple parades, an arts and crafts fair, entertainment on a stage in Memorial Park, and other amusements.

== History ==
The Washington State Apple Blossom Festival, originally called "Blossom Days", was founded in 1919 to celebrate the importance of the apple industry to the region. The Ladies Musical Club produced the first festival in 1920, a one-day event in Memorial Park involving songs, speeches, maypoles, and baseball. The festival's relative success in drawing in large crowds from the area assured the continuation of the festival in subsequent years. In 1921, the Commercial Club, forerunner of the Wenatchee Valley Chamber of Commerce, took over sponsorship of the celebration.

When the festival began again after World War II, the festival was renamed the Washington State Apple Blossom Festival to more accurately reflect the importance of the apple industry in North Central Washington.

In 1967, Wenatchee established a sister city relationship with the Aomori Apple Blossom Festival in Japan.

On what would've been the centennial anniversary in 2020, officials cite the COVID-19 pandemic as grounds for cancellation. The next year saw the festival defer to early June.

There were other cancellations from 1942 to 1945.
