= West Wenatchee, Washington =

- Unincorporated community
- Location of West Wenatchee, Washington
- Coordinates: 47°26′16″N 120°20′46″W
- Country: United States
- State: Washington
- County: Chelan

Area
  - Total: 4.1 sq mi (10.7 km^{2})
  - Land: 3.9 sq mi (10.2 km^{2})
  - Water: 0.19 sq mi (0.5 km^{2})
- Elevation: 889 ft (271 m)

Population (2000)
  - Total: 1,681
  - Density: 425/sq mi (164.2/km^{2})
- Time zone: UTC-8 (Pacific (PST))
  - Summer (DST): UTC-7 (PDT)
- ZIP code: 98801
- Area code: 509
- FIPS code: 53-77910
- GNIS feature ID: 1867647

West Wenatchee is a former census-designated place (CDP) and now an unincorporated community in Chelan County, Washington, United States. The United States Census Bureau removed the community at the 2010 census, with most of its former area being merged into Wenatchee city limits, raising the population significantly. The area that was West Wenatchee is part of the Wenatchee–East Wenatchee Metropolitan Statistical Area.

== Geography ==
West Wenatchee is located at 47°26′16″N 120°20′46″W (47.437855, -120.346030).

According to the United States Census Bureau, the CDP had a total area of 4.1 square miles (10.7 km^{2}), of which 4.0 square miles (10.2 km^{2}) was land and 0.2 square miles (0.5 km^{2}) (4.36%) was water, in 2000. This area was merged into that of Wenatchee's municipal boundaries at the 2010 census.

== Demographics ==
Historical population
Census	Pop.	Note	%±
1950	2,690		—
1960	2,518		−6.4%
1970	2,134		−15.3%
1980	2,187		2.5%
1990	2,220		1.5%
2000	1,681		−24.3%
U.S. Decennial Census; 1960 1970 1980 1990; 2000 2010

West Wenatchee first appeared as an unincorporated community in the 1950 U.S. census; and as a census designated place in the 1980 U.S. census. The CDP was mostly annexed to the city of Wenatchee prior to the 2010 U.S. census.

As of the 2000 United States census, there were 1,681 people, 628 households, and 509 families residing in the CDP. The population density was 425.4 people per square mile (164.3/km^{2}). There were 661 housing units at an average density of 167.3/sq mi (64.6/km^{2}). The racial makeup of the CDP was 93.75% White, 0.18% African American, 0.24% Native American, 1.07% Asian, 0.06% Pacific Islander, 3.45% from other races, and 1.25% from two or more races. Hispanic or Latino of any race were 8.09% of the population.

There were 628 households, out of which 32.5% had children under the age of 18 living with them, 70.7% were married couples living together, 7.0% had a female householder with no husband present, and 18.9% were non-families. 14.5% of all households were made up of individuals, and 5.3% had someone living alone who was 65 years of age or older. The average household size was 2.67 and the average family size was 2.94.

In the CDP, the age distribution of the population shows 25.3% under the age of 18, 6.5% from 18 to 24, 22.7% from 25 to 44, 29.6% from 45 to 64, and 15.9% who were 65 years of age or older. The median age was 43 years. For every 100 females, there were 95.5 males. For every 100 females age 18 and over, there were 97.2 males.

The median income for a household in the CDP was $44,028, and the median income for a family was $47,155. Males had a median income of $37,171 versus $23,750 for females. The per capita income for the CDP was $21,536. About 1.7% of families and 4.0% of the population were below the poverty line, including 6.2% of those under age 18 and none of those age 65 or over.
