= Chelan County, Washington =

County in Washington, United States

- County
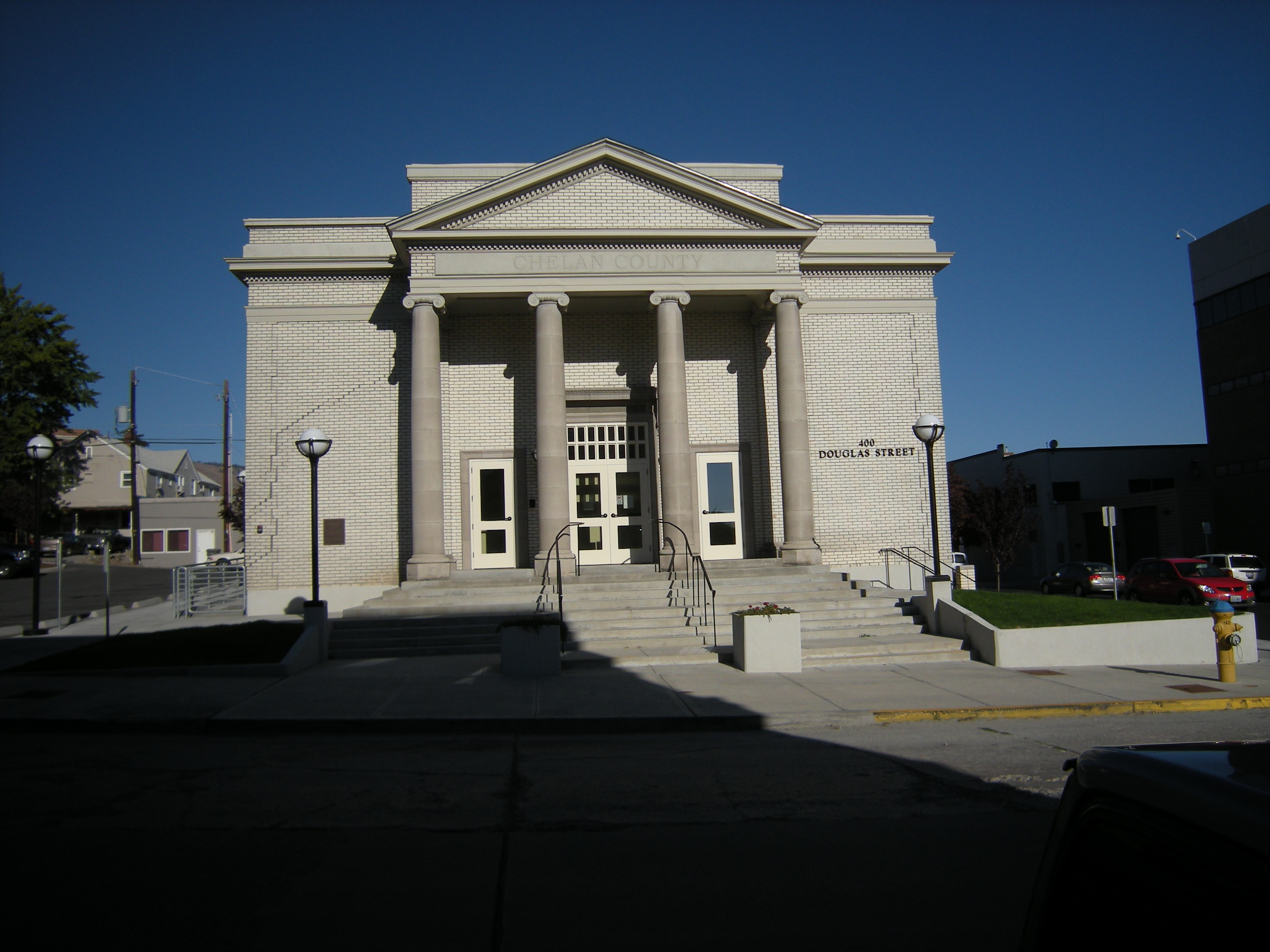
- Chelan County Administration Building

- Seal

- Location within the U.S. state of Washington
- Coordinates: 47°51′40″N 120°37′09″W
- Country: United States
- State: Washington
- Founded: March 13, 1899
- Seat: Wenatchee
- Largest city: Wenatchee

Area
  - Total: 2,994 sq mi (7,750 km^{2})
  - Land: 2,921 sq mi (7,570 km^{2})
  - Water: 73 sq mi (190 km^{2}) 2.5%

Population (2020)
  - Total: 79,074
  - Estimate (2025): 81,941 ▲
  - Density: 26/sq mi (10/km^{2})
- Time zone: UTC−8 (Pacific)
  - Summer (DST): UTC−7 (PDT)
- Congressional district: 8th
- Website: co.chelan.wa.us

Chelan County (/ʃəˈlæn/, shə-LAN) is a county in the U.S. state of Washington. As of the 2020 census, its population was 79,074. The county seat and largest city is Wenatchee. The county was created out of Okanogan and Kittitas Counties on March 13, 1899. It derives its name from a Chelan Indian word meaning "deep water," likely a reference to 55-mile (89 km)-long Lake Chelan, which reaches a maximum depth of 1,486 feet (453 m).

Chelan County is part of the Wenatchee, Washington, Metropolitan Statistical Area.

== Geography ==
According to the United States Census Bureau, the county has a total area of 2,994 square miles (7,750 km^{2}), of which 2,921 square miles (7,570 km^{2}) is land and 73 square miles (190 km^{2}) (2.5%) is water. It is the third-largest county in Washington by area.

=== Geographic features ===
- Bonanza Peak, highest point in Chelan County
- Cascade Mountains
- Chelan Mountains
- Chelan River
- Chiwaukum Mountains
- Columbia River
- Entiat Mountains
- Entiat River
- Lake Chelan
- Lake Wenatchee
- Stuart Range
- The Enchantments
- Wenatchee Mountains
- Wenatchee River
- Columbia River Basalt

=== Major highways ===
- U.S. Route 2
- U.S. Route 97
- U.S. Route 97 Alternate

=== Adjacent counties ===
- Okanogan County - northeast
- Douglas County - east
- Kittitas County - south
- King County - southwest
- Snohomish County - west
- Skagit County - northwest

=== National protected areas ===
- Lake Chelan National Recreation Area
- North Cascades National Park (part)
- Wenatchee National Forest (part)
- Alpine Lakes Wilderness

== Demographics ==
Historical population
| Census | Pop. | Note | %± |
|---|---|---|---|
| 1900 | 3,931 | | — |
| 1910 | 15,104 | | 284.2% |
| 1920 | 20,906 | | 38.4% |
| 1930 | 31,634 | | 51.3% |
| 1940 | 34,412 | | 8.8% |
| 1950 | 39,301 | | 14.2% |
| 1960 | 40,744 | | 3.7% |
| 1970 | 41,355 | | 1.5% |
| 1980 | 45,061 | | 9.0% |
| 1990 | 52,250 | | 16.0% |
| 2000 | 66,616 | | 27.5% |
| 2010 | 72,453 | | 8.8% |
| 2020 | 79,074 | | 9.1% |
| 2025 (est.) | 81,941 | ▲ | 3.6% |
U.S. Decennial Census; 1790–1960 1900–1990; 1990–2000 2010–2020

=== 2020 census ===
As of the 2020 census, the county had a population of 79,074. Of the residents, 22.3% were under the age of 18 and 20.6% were 65 years of age or older; the median age was 41.0 years. For every 100 females there were 99.9 males, and for every 100 females age 18 and over there were 97.6 males. 66.4% of residents lived in urban areas and 33.6% lived in rural areas.

Chelan County, Washington – Racial and ethnic composition Note: the US Census treats Hispanic/Latino as an ethnic category. This table excludes Latinos from the racial categories and assigns them to a separate category. Hispanics/Latinos may be of any race.
| Race / Ethnicity (NH = Non-Hispanic) | Pop 2000 | Pop 2010 | Pop 2020 | % 2000 | % 2010 | % 2020 |
|---|---|---|---|---|---|---|
| White alone (NH) | 51,590 | 51,202 | 52,093 | 77.44% | 70.67% | 65.88% |
| Black or African American alone (NH) | 111 | 177 | 253 | 0.17% | 0.24% | 0.32% |
| Native American or Alaska Native alone (NH) | 552 | 514 | 408 | 0.83% | 0.71% | 0.52% |
| Asian alone (NH) | 441 | 570 | 787 | 0.66% | 0.79% | 1.00% |
| Pacific Islander alone (NH) | 66 | 89 | 109 | 0.10% | 0.12% | 0.14% |
| Other race alone (NH) | 93 | 76 | 381 | 0.14% | 0.10% | 0.48% |
| Mixed race or Multiracial (NH) | 932 | 1,112 | 2,939 | 1.40% | 1.53% | 3.72% |
| Hispanic or Latino (any race) | 12,831 | 18,713 | 22,104 | 19.26% | 25.83% | 27.95% |
| Total | 66,616 | 72,453 | 79,074 | 100.00% | 100.00% | 100.00% |

The racial makeup of the county was 69.9% White, 0.4% Black or African American, 1.0% American Indian and Alaska Native, 1.0% Asian, 16.8% from some other race, and 10.7% from two or more races. Hispanic or Latino residents of any race comprised 28.0% of the population.

There were 30,296 households in the county, of which 29.8% had children under the age of 18 living with them and 24.1% had a female householder with no spouse or partner present. About 26.6% of all households were made up of individuals and 13.0% had someone living alone who was 65 years of age or older.

There were 37,267 housing units, of which 18.7% were vacant. Among occupied housing units, 65.0% were owner-occupied and 35.0% were renter-occupied. The homeowner vacancy rate was 1.2% and the rental vacancy rate was 6.5%.

=== 2010 census ===
As of the 2010 census, there were 72,453 people, 27,827 households, and 18,795 families living in the county. The population density was 24.8 inhabitants per square mile (9.6/km^{2}). There were 35,465 housing units at an average density of 12.1 units per square mile (4.7 units/km^{2}). The racial makeup of the county was 79.3% white, 1.0% American Indian, 0.8% Asian, 0.3% black or African American, 0.1% Pacific islander, 15.7% from other races, and 2.7% from two or more races. Those of Hispanic or Latino origin made up 25.8% of the population. In terms of ancestry, 17.6% were German, 15.0% were American, 11.3% were English, and 8.3% were Irish.

Of the 27,827 households, 32.4% had children under the age of 18 living with them, 52.7% were married couples living together, 9.7% had a female householder with no husband present, 32.5% were non-families, and 26.3% of all households were made up of individuals. The average household size was 2.57 and the average family size was 3.10. The median age was 39.3 years.

The median income for a household in the county was $48,674 and the median income for a family was $57,856. Males had a median income of $41,076 versus $34,261 for females. The per capita income for the county was $24,378. About 8.2% of families and 11.5% of the population were below the poverty line, including 16.8% of those under age 18 and 9.0% of those age 65 or over.

=== 2000 census ===
As of the 2000 census, there were 66,616 people, 25,021 households, and 17,364 families living in the county. The population density was 23 people per square mile (8.9 people/km^{2}). There were 30,407 housing units at an average density of 10 units per square mile (3.9 units/km^{2}). The racial makeup of the county was 83.63% White, 0.26% Black or African American, 0.99% Native American, 0.68% Asian, 0.12% Pacific Islander, 12.19% from other races, and 2.14% from two or more races. 19.26% of the population were Hispanic or Latino of any race. 16.9% were of German, 11.2% English, 9.3% United States or American and 7.1% Irish ancestry. 80.9% spoke English and 18.1% Spanish as their first language.

There were 25,021 households, out of which 34.50% had children under the age of 18 living with them, 56.40% were married couples living together, 8.70% had a female householder with no husband present, and 30.60% were non-families. 25.10% of all households were made up of individuals, and 10.80% had someone living alone who was 65 years of age or older. The average household size was 2.62 and the average family size was 3.14.

In the county, 28.00% of the population was under the age of 18, 8.30% was from 18 to 24, 27.20% from 25 to 44, 22.70% from 45 to 64, and 13.90% was 65 years of age or older. The median age was 36 years. For every 100 females, there were 99.10 males. For every 100 females age 18 and over, there were 96.80 males.

The median income for a household in the county was $37,316, and the median income for a family was $46,293. Males had a median income of $35,065 versus $25,838 for females. The per capita income for the county was $19,273. About 8.80% of families and 12.40% of the population were below the poverty line, including 16.00% of those under age 18 and 7.40% of those age 65 or over.

== Communities ==
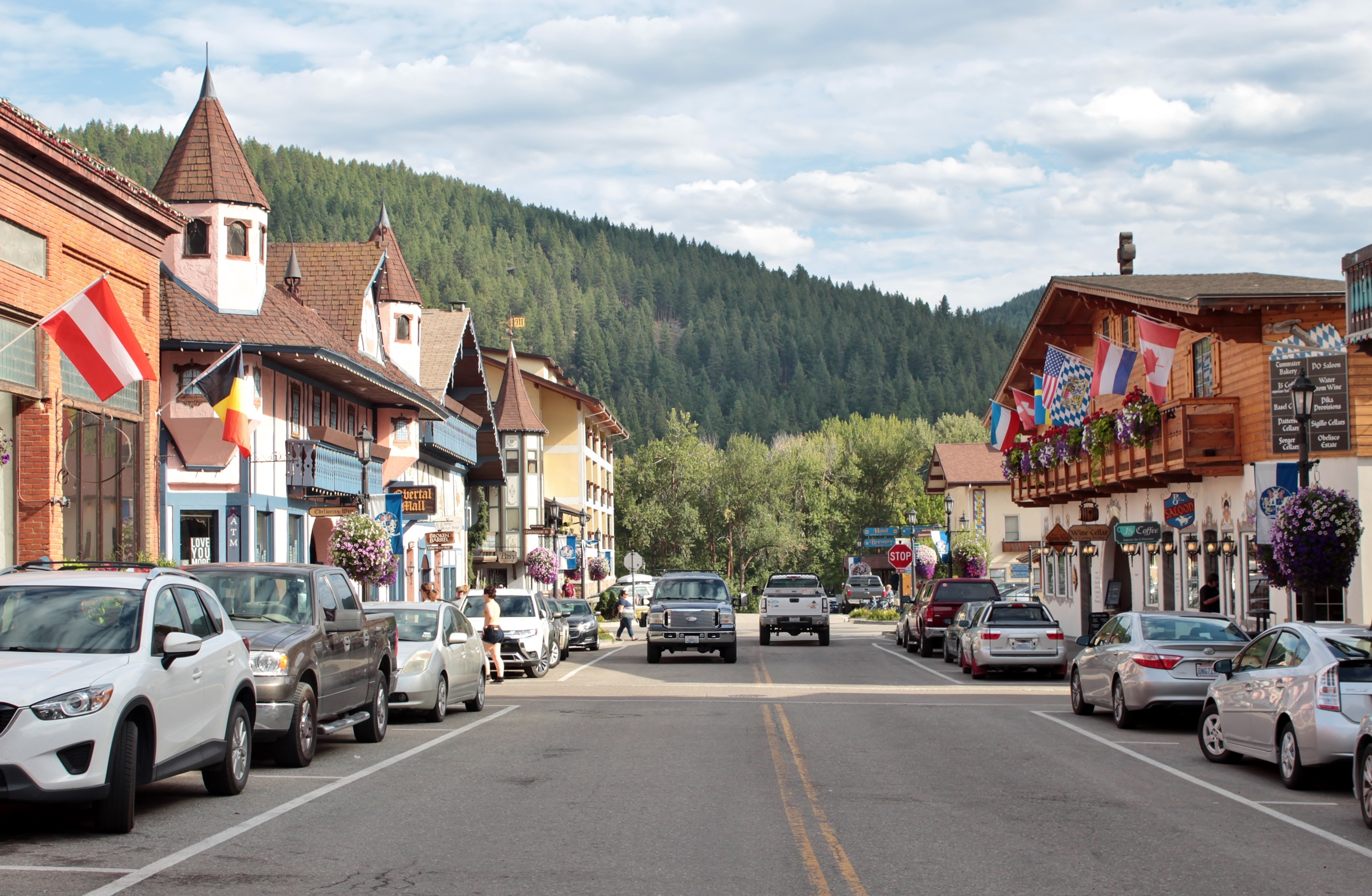
A street in Leavenworth, Washington

=== Cities ===
- Cashmere
- Chelan
- Entiat
- Leavenworth
- Wenatchee

=== Census-designated places ===
- Chelan Falls
- Manson
- South Wenatchee
- Sunnyslope

=== Unincorporated communities ===
- Ardenvoir
- Coles Corner
- Dryden
- Holden Village
- Lucerne
- Malaga
- Merritt
- Monitor
- Peshastin
- Plain
- Telma
- Wenatchee Heights
- West Wenatchee
- Winton

=== Ghost towns ===
- Blewett
- Moore
- Winesap

== Politics ==
Chelan County is part of the 8th Congressional District federally, represented by Democrat Kim Schrier. A Republican Party stronghold, it has become more competitive in recent years; though he carried the county in all three of his runs, Donald Trump won it by single-digit margins in 2020 and 2024.

United States presidential election results for Chelan County, Washington
| Year | Republican | | Democratic | | Third party(ies) | |
| Year | No. | % | No. | % | No. | % |
|---|---|---|---|---|---|---|
| 1900 | 577 | 48.98% | 573 | 48.64% | 28 | 2.38% |
| 1904 | 1,248 | 72.18% | 372 | 21.52% | 109 | 6.30% |
| 1908 | 1,639 | 59.71% | 871 | 31.73% | 235 | 8.56% |
| 1912 | 970 | 18.83% | 1,331 | 25.84% | 2,849 | 55.32% |
| 1916 | 3,011 | 47.63% | 2,747 | 43.46% | 563 | 8.91% |
| 1920 | 3,885 | 58.55% | 1,540 | 23.21% | 1,210 | 18.24% |
| 1924 | 4,543 | 55.56% | 995 | 12.17% | 2,639 | 32.27% |
| 1928 | 7,672 | 77.07% | 2,239 | 22.49% | 43 | 0.43% |
| 1932 | 5,584 | 40.29% | 7,316 | 52.79% | 959 | 6.92% |
| 1936 | 4,975 | 36.89% | 8,030 | 59.54% | 481 | 3.57% |
| 1940 | 8,019 | 52.50% | 7,181 | 47.02% | 73 | 0.48% |
| 1944 | 7,081 | 51.64% | 6,557 | 47.82% | 75 | 0.55% |
| 1948 | 7,392 | 48.15% | 7,702 | 50.17% | 257 | 1.67% |
| 1952 | 11,164 | 61.73% | 6,867 | 37.97% | 53 | 0.29% |
| 1956 | 10,405 | 57.42% | 7,600 | 41.94% | 117 | 0.65% |
| 1960 | 9,854 | 54.10% | 8,177 | 44.89% | 183 | 1.00% |
| 1964 | 7,406 | 41.56% | 10,295 | 57.77% | 121 | 0.68% |
| 1968 | 9,093 | 52.77% | 6,787 | 39.39% | 1,350 | 7.84% |
| 1972 | 10,470 | 60.13% | 5,889 | 33.82% | 1,054 | 6.05% |
| 1976 | 10,492 | 56.13% | 7,623 | 40.78% | 577 | 3.09% |
| 1980 | 11,299 | 56.92% | 6,483 | 32.66% | 2,068 | 10.42% |
| 1984 | 13,667 | 65.10% | 6,978 | 33.24% | 349 | 1.66% |
| 1988 | 11,601 | 57.82% | 8,183 | 40.78% | 281 | 1.40% |
| 1992 | 10,716 | 45.65% | 7,860 | 33.48% | 4,900 | 20.87% |
| 1996 | 12,363 | 51.79% | 8,595 | 36.01% | 2,912 | 12.20% |
| 2000 | 16,980 | 64.03% | 8,412 | 31.72% | 1,125 | 4.24% |
| 2004 | 18,482 | 62.87% | 10,471 | 35.62% | 443 | 1.51% |
| 2008 | 17,605 | 55.09% | 13,781 | 43.12% | 572 | 1.79% |
| 2012 | 18,402 | 57.06% | 13,112 | 40.66% | 736 | 2.28% |
| 2016 | 18,114 | 52.61% | 13,032 | 37.85% | 3,287 | 9.55% |
| 2020 | 22,746 | 52.52% | 19,349 | 44.68% | 1,211 | 2.80% |
| 2024 | 22,363 | 53.00% | 18,397 | 43.60% | 1,431 | 3.39% |

== See also ==
- Chelan County Public Utility District
- Indian Pass, Washington
- Lake Chelan AVA
- National Register of Historic Places listings in Chelan County, Washington
- USS Chelan County (LST-542)
- Wenatchee Valley College
- Wenatchee School District
