= Wenatchee, Washington =

- City
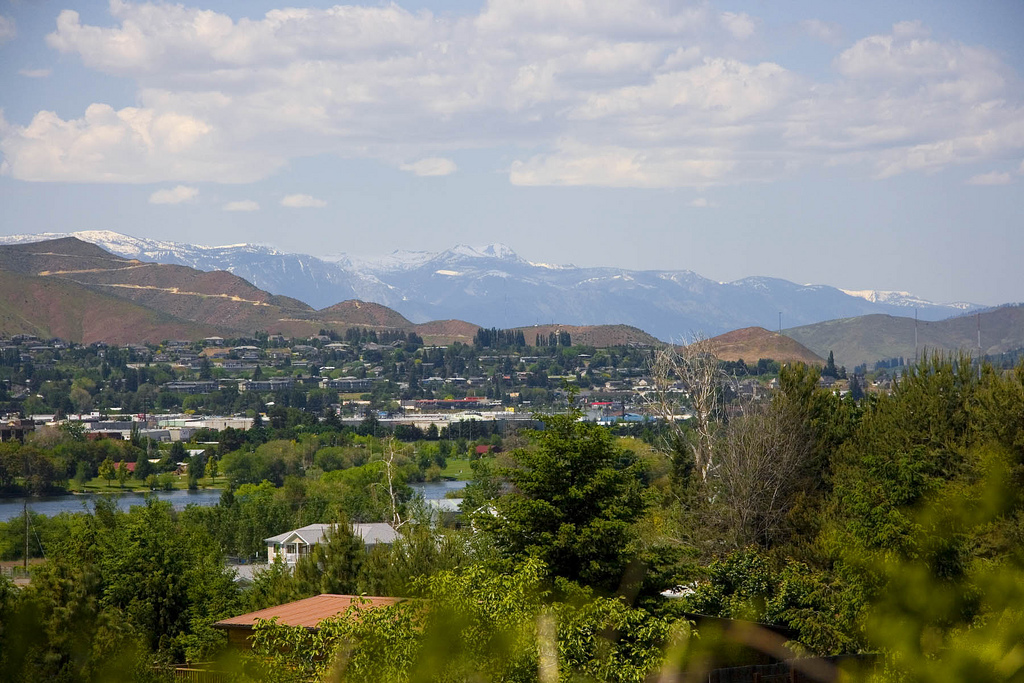
- View over the city in 2009

- Flag
- Nickname: Apple Capital of the World
- Location of Wenatchee in Chelan County, Washington

- Location within Washington (state) Location within the United States
- Coordinates: 47°28′24″N 120°19′20″W
- Country: United States
- State: Washington
- County: Chelan
- Established: 1892
- Incorporated: February 29, 1892
- Named for: Wenatchi tribe

Government
  - Type: Mayor–council
  - Mayor: Mike Poirier
  - Council: Wenatchee City Council

Area
  - City: 11.49 sq mi (29.75 km^{2})
  - Land: 10.58 sq mi (27.39 km^{2})
  - Water: 0.91 sq mi (2.36 km^{2})
  - Urban: 31.373 sq mi (81.256 km^{2})
  - Metro: 1,870 sq mi (4,843 km^{2})
- Elevation: 715 ft (218 m)

Population (2020)
  - City: 35,508
  - Estimate (2024): 35,401 ▼
  - Density: 3,249.3/sq mi (1,254.56/km^{2})
  - Urban: 67,227 (US: 412th)
  - Urban density: 210.45/sq mi (81.256/km^{2})
  - Metro: 119,943 (US: 324th)
  - Metro density: 22.9/sq mi (8.84/km^{2})
  - Demonym: Wenatcheeite
- Time zone: PST
- ZIP Codes: 98801 and 98807
- Area code: 509
- FIPS code: 53-77105
- GNIS feature ID: 2412212
- Website: www.wenatcheewa.gov

Wenatchee (/wɛˈnætʃiː/ wen-ACH-ee) is the county seat of and the most populous city in Chelan County, Washington, United States. The population was 35,508 as of the 2020 census. The city lies at the confluence of the Columbia and Wenatchee rivers near the eastern foothills of the Cascade Range in north-central Washington. Wenatchee is on the west side of the Columbia River in Chelan County, across from the city of East Wenatchee in Douglas County.

The city was named for the Wenatchi, a Native American tribe that inhabited the area around the confluence at the time of European-American contact. The name is a Sahaptin word that means "river which comes [or whose source is] from canyons" or "robe of the rainbow". Awenatchela means "people at the source [of a river]". The city of Wenatchee shares its name with the Wenatchee River, Lake Wenatchee and the Wenatchee National Forest.

Wenatchee is the principal city of the Wenatchee–East Wenatchee, Washington Metropolitan Statistical Area, which encompasses all of Chelan and Douglas counties (total population around 110,884). However, the "Wenatchee Valley Area" generally refers to the land between Rocky Reach and Rock Island Dam on both banks of the Columbia River. Wenatchee is referred to as the "Apple Capital of the World" due to the valley's many orchards. The city is also sometimes referred to as the "Buckle of the Power Belt of the Great Northwest" which is a metaphor for the series of hydroelectric dams on the Columbia River. Rock Island Dam is located nearest to the middle of this "belt", and so was labeled the "Buckle". This saying is printed at the top of every issue of Wenatchee's newspaper, The Wenatchee World, but is no longer in common use elsewhere.

== History ==
=== Prehistoric era ===
The Wenatchee Reach of the Columbia River was formed during the Missoula floods, a series of ice age floods that inundated much of modern-day Eastern Washington. The earliest known human artifacts in the area were from the prehistoric Clovis culture and discovered in a cache at the East Wenatchee Clovis Site. The site was uncovered in 1987 and include stone and bone tools covered in volcanic ash from a Glacier Peak eruption approximately 13,410 to 13,710 years before present, as determined by radiocarbon dating.

=== Indigenous villages and early settlers ===
Several indigenous villages existed in the area prior to and during Anglo American exploration. The village Nikwikwi'estku was a fishing and gathering camp located in present-day downtown Wenatchee. In 1811, North West Company surveyor David Thompson encountered a group of Native American horsemen at Wenatchee and was invited into a village with huts, the largest measuring 209 feet long. Fur traders document friendly relations through the mid 19th century, even during the smallpox epidemic of 1817 and food shortages in 1841.

During the Yakima War in 1856, US Army Colonel Wright intervened on a possible alliance between Yakama and Wenatchi tribes by removing the Wenatchi to Kittitas. The resulting march was estimated to include 1,000 horses and extend five miles long. A contingent stayed behind to fish at Wenatchapam Fishery in preparation for winter.

In 1863, Father Respari, a Catholic priest, began his missionary work with local Native Americans. He was followed some 20 years later by Father De Grassi, who built a log cabin on the Wenatchee River near the present town of Cashmere. Throughout the 19th century, other white settlers came to homestead the land.

Wenatchee was platted in September 1888 and officially incorporated as a city on January 7, 1893. Frank and Belle Reeves founded The Wenatchee Advance, the city's first newspaper, in 1891. The 1900 U.S. Census counted 451 residents.

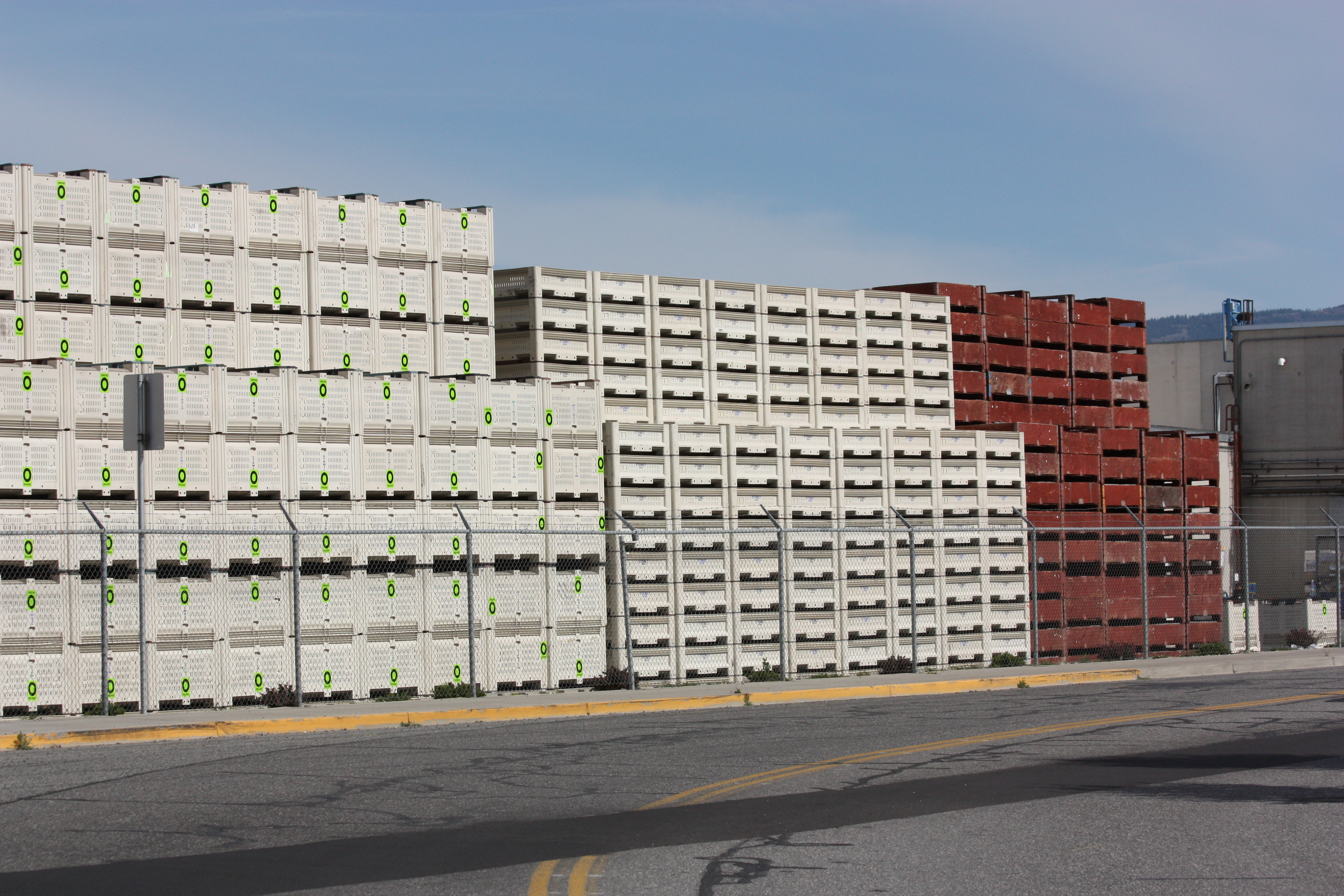
Apple field bins stacked high at a processing facility in Wenatchee

=== Continued growth ===
The Great Northern Railway completed its railroad line between St. Paul, Minnesota, and Seattle in 1893. Its route through the Wenatchee Valley was significant to the development of this region. The railroad not only provided passenger travel to and from Wenatchee, but it provided for freight service for shipments of wheat, apples, and other products to out-of-state markets.

By the early 20th century, the Wenatchee Commercial Club, now the Wenatchee Valley Chamber of Commerce, was advertising the region as the "Home of the World's Best Apples." The tree fruit industry provided the economic backbone for the region for a century and still is an important source of revenue.

On May 22, 1910, the Wenatchee free speech fight occurred when members of the Industrial Workers of the World (IWW) were arrested for speaking in the street in front of the local hall of the Socialist Party of America. The town had freed imprisoned IWW members by June; however, tensions resumed in September 1911 when police raided a house rented by six IWW men and arrested twenty-five migrant workers found carrying IWW literature. Again, the men were all quickly released.

In 1922, a Ku Klux Klan chapter of nearly 100 men demanded that black residents leave on threat of violence. By 1923 they hosted meetings of up to 400 members and burned a large cross above Fancher airfield in East Wenatchee. The Wenatchee chapter hosted the 1926 state Klan convention and marched in the Apple Blossom Parade. In the wave of anti-Filipino sentiment, Filipino immigrant workers were targeted by violence and deportation through the late 1920s.

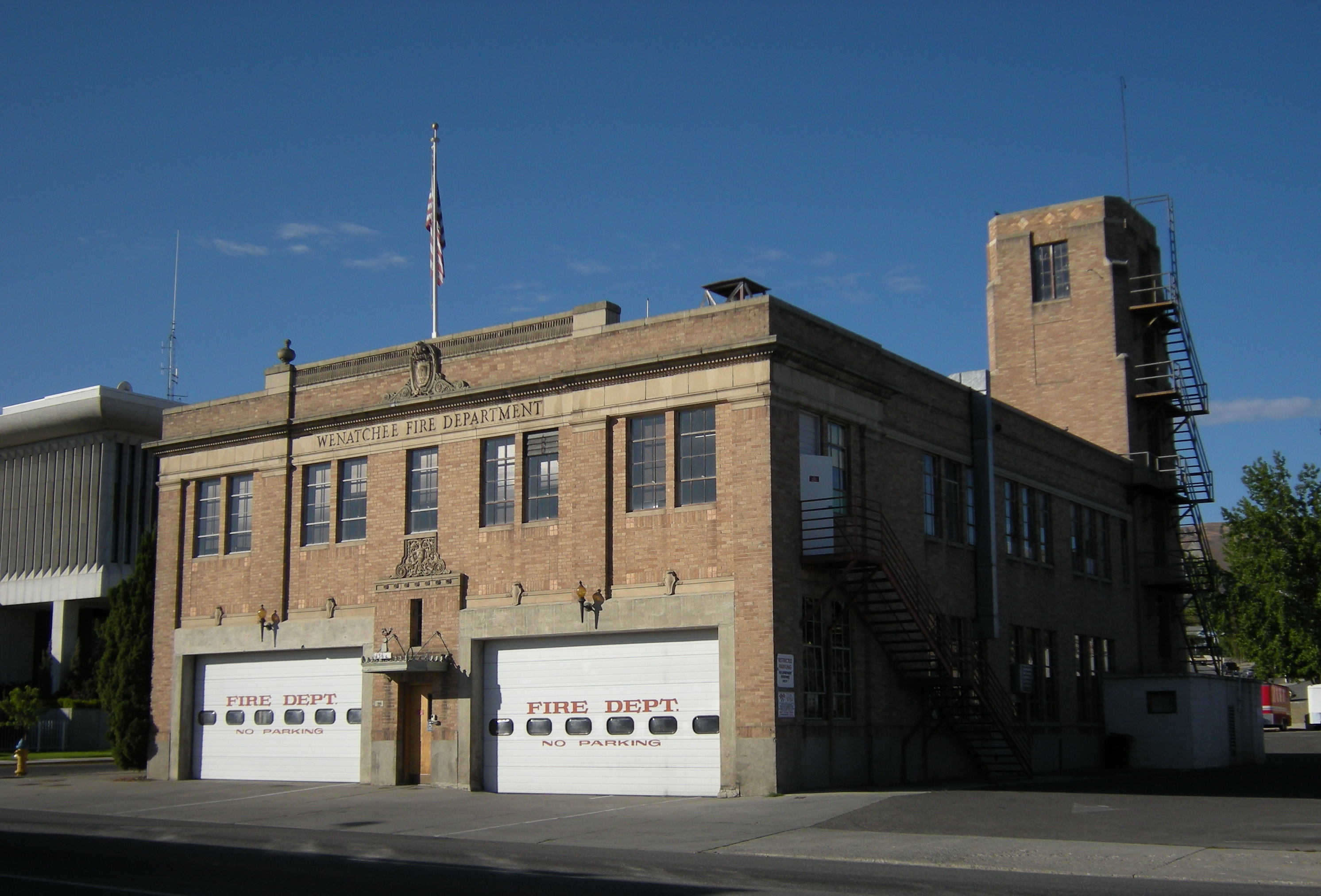
Wenatchee Fire Station No. 1 is listed on the National Register of Historic Places (NRHP).

On October 5, 1931, Clyde Pangborn and his copilot Hugh Herndon landed their airplane, named the Miss Veedol, in the hills of East Wenatchee, and thus became the first aviators to fly nonstop across the Pacific Ocean. The 41-hour flight from Sabishiro Beach, Misawa, Aomori Prefecture, Japan, won them the Harmon Trophy for the greatest achievement in flight of 1931. Miss Veedol's propeller is on display at the Wenatchee Valley Museum & Cultural Center.

In 1936, with the completion of Rock Island Dam, Wenatchee was protected from the summer flooding of the Columbia River, and the first of 14 hydroelectric projects on the Columbia began generating electric power. The reservoirs thus generated also made it possible to irrigate hundreds of thousands of acres of farmland in the Columbia Basin.

In 2019, the Wenatchee Valley was named by Forbes magazine as one of the top 25 places to retire.

=== Modern era ===
In 1975, Stemilt Growers moved its headquarters from nearby Stemilt Hill to Olds Station, Wenatchee. The company grows, packs and ships tree fruit. It went on to become the largest fresh market sweet cherry shipper in the world.

Every year from the last week of April to the end of the first week of May, Wenatchee hosts the Washington State Apple Blossom Festival, which probably brings in the largest number of people Wenatchee sees annually, with the exception of migrant workers travelling for harvest. It features two relatively large parades: the Apple Blossom Youth Parade on the last Saturday in April and the Apple Blossom Grand Parade on the first Saturday in May, a food fair representing cuisine from around the world, and a traveling carnival.

The Wenatchee child abuse prosecutions in Wenatchee, Washington, also known as the "Wenatchee Witch Hunt", that occurred in 1994 and 1995, are examples of the hysteria over child molestation in the 1980s and early 1990s.

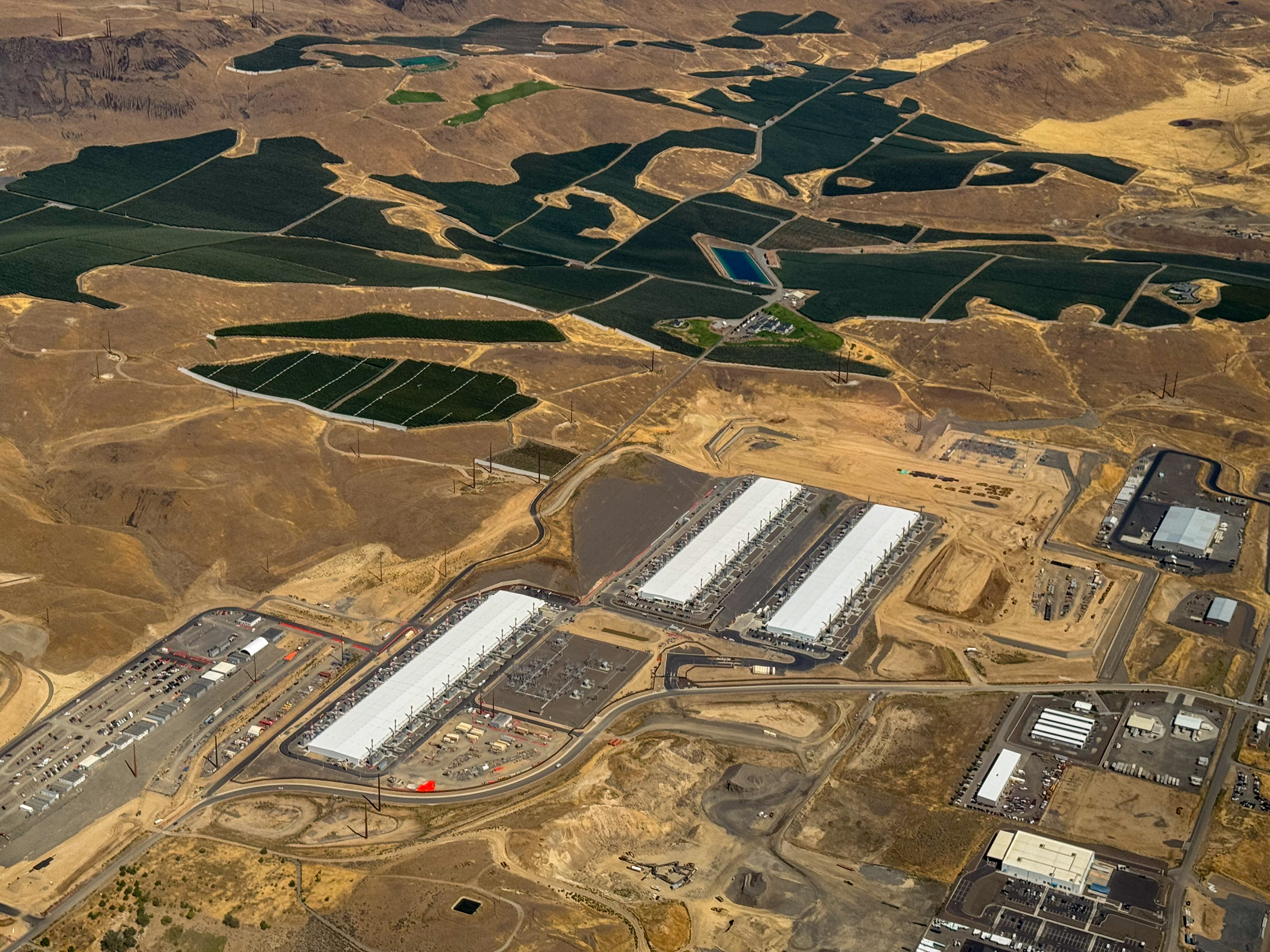
Microsoft Azure datacenters in the Pangborn area

In the early 1990s Wenatchee had a reputation as the "happy pill town" and "Happy Valley", with psychologist James Goodwin, "the Pied Piper of Prozac".

According to CNN's Money Magazine, Wenatchee had the second fastest forecast real estate value growth in the country for June 2006–June 2007. In November 2018, USA Today listed Wenatchee as experiencing the 22nd highest employment growth in the country.

On July 29, 2013, a large wildfire spreading over 31 miles (50 km) south of Wenatchee occurred, affecting over 40 nearby homes.

The Riverfront Park Ice Arena closed its doors in July 2008, and Awaken Church was later opened at the site.

The Wenatchee Valley also boasts one of only two aluminum smelters remaining in the Northwestern United States, at the Alcoa plant in Malaga. The plant announced in November 2015 that it would be shutting down operations on January 5, 2016. Other growing areas of the regional economy are tourism and information technology.

Wenatchee Pride began organizing LGBT Pride festivals 2017. The 2023 festival was held at Memorial Park with an estimated 4,000 attendance.

== Geography ==
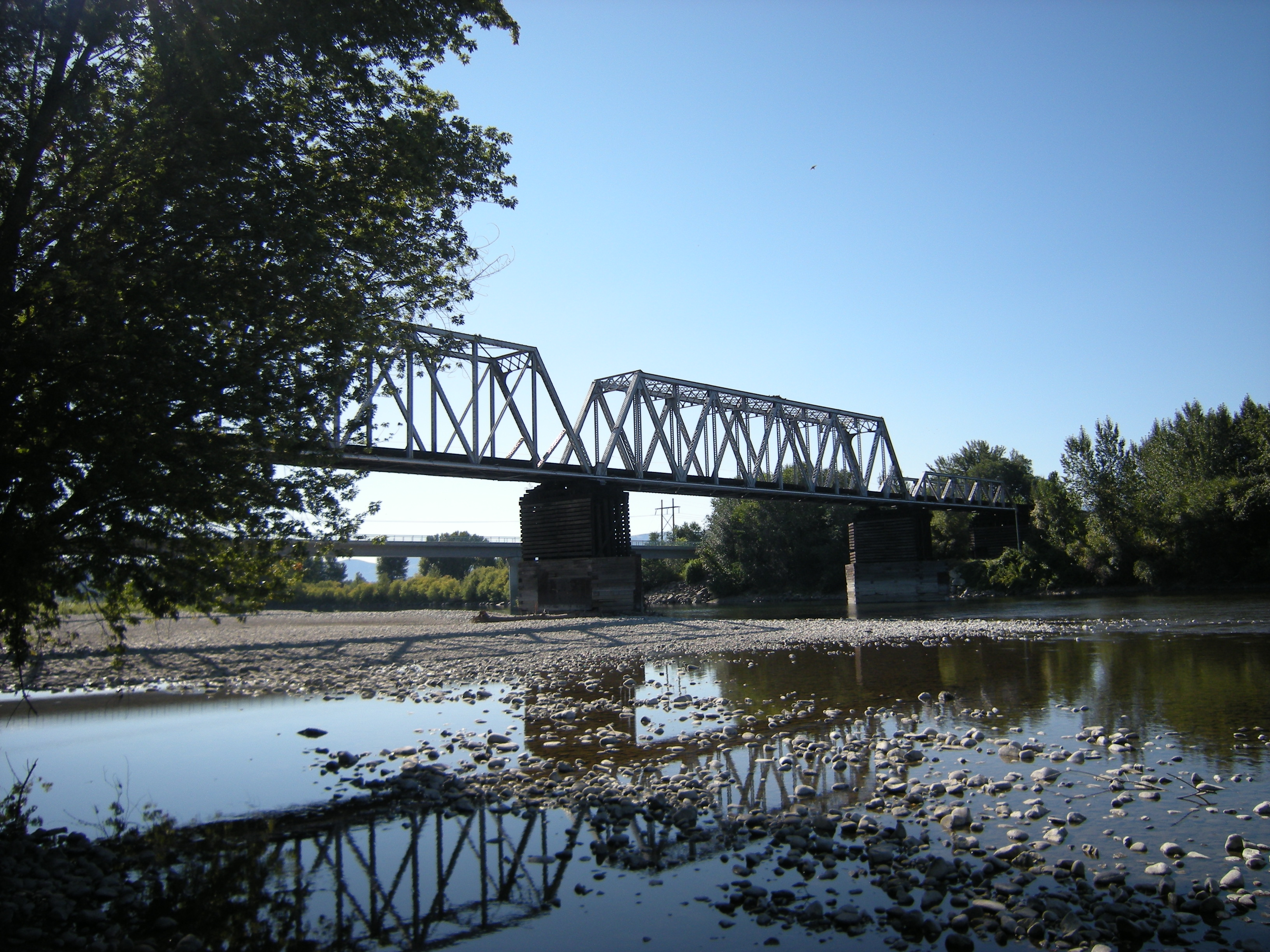
The Wenatchee River, near where it flows into the Columbia River

Wenatchee is located at the confluence of the Wenatchee and Columbia rivers in the Columbia Basin, just east of the foothills of the Cascade Range. Irrigation from the Columbia River and its tributaries allows for the large amount of agriculture in Wenatchee and the surrounding areas.

The city of Wenatchee is bordered by the Wenatchee River on the north, the Columbia River to the east, and the Wenatchee Mountains to the south and west. These ridges and peaks form a wall around the western and southern sides of the city. According to the United States Census Bureau, the city has a total area of 8.04 square miles (20.82 km^{2}), of which 7.77 square miles (20.12 km^{2}) is land and 0.27 square miles (0.70 km^{2}) is water.

=== Climate ===
Wenatchee experiences a semi-arid climate (Köppen BSk) with cold winters and hot, dry summers.

Climate data for Wenatchee, Washington (1991–2020 normals, extremes 1931–present)
Month	Jan	Feb	Mar	Apr	May	Jun	Jul	Aug	Sep	Oct	Nov	Dec	Year
Record high °F (°C)	65 (18)	66 (19)	78 (26)	93 (34)	104 (40)	113 (45)	110 (43)	106 (41)	101 (38)	90 (32)	76 (24)	74 (23)	113 (45)
Mean daily maximum °F (°C)	35.8 (2.1)	43.9 (6.6)	54.3 (12.4)	63.9 (17.7)	73.2 (22.9)	79.6 (26.4)	89.0 (31.7)	88.2 (31.2)	78.8 (26.0)	63.3 (17.4)	46.6 (8.1)	36.2 (2.3)	62.7 (17.1)
Daily mean °F (°C)	30.7 (−0.7)	35.7 (2.1)	43.8 (6.6)	52.2 (11.2)	61.2 (16.2)	67.7 (19.8)	75.5 (24.2)	74.6 (23.7)	65.6 (18.7)	52.3 (11.3)	39.4 (4.1)	31.3 (−0.4)	52.5 (11.4)
Mean daily minimum °F (°C)	25.6 (−3.6)	27.6 (−2.4)	33.4 (0.8)	40.4 (4.7)	49.3 (9.6)	55.8 (13.2)	62.1 (16.7)	61.1 (16.2)	52.3 (11.3)	41.3 (5.2)	32.3 (0.2)	26.4 (−3.1)	42.3 (5.7)
Record low °F (°C)	−17 (−27)	−18 (−28)	5 (−15)	20 (−7)	27 (−3)	39 (4)	40 (4)	41 (5)	21 (−6)	19 (−7)	0 (−18)	−19 (−28)	−19 (−28)
Average precipitation inches (mm)	1.32 (34)	0.92 (23)	0.73 (19)	0.58 (15)	0.75 (19)	0.60 (15)	0.22 (5.6)	0.18 (4.6)	0.24 (6.1)	0.72 (18)	1.15 (29)	1.59 (40)	9.00 (229)
Average snowfall inches (cm)	5.6 (14)	3.0 (7.6)	0.4 (1.0)	0.0 (0.0)	0.0 (0.0)	0.0 (0.0)	0.0 (0.0)	0.0 (0.0)	0.0 (0.0)	0.0 (0.0)	1.5 (3.8)	6.0 (15)	16.5 (42)
Average precipitation days (≥ 0.01 in)	9.5	7.2	6.0	4.6	5.5	4.0	1.9	1.8	2.2	6.1	8.6	10.0	67.4
Average snowy days (≥ 0.1 in)	4.2	1.8	0.4	0.0	0.0	0.0	0.0	0.0	0.0	0.0	1.2	5.3	12.9
Source: NOAA

== Demographics ==
Historical population
Census	Pop.	Note	%±
1900	451		—
1910	4,050		798.0%
1920	6,324		56.1%
1930	11,627		83.9%
1940	11,620		−0.1%
1950	13,072		12.5%
1960	16,726		28.0%
1970	16,912		1.1%
1980	17,257		2.0%
1990	21,756		26.1%
2000	27,856		28.0%
2010	31,925		14.6%
2020	35,508		11.2%
2024 (est.)	35,401		−0.3%
U.S. Decennial Census

=== 2020 census ===
As of the 2020 census, Wenatchee had a population of 35,508, 13,793 households, and 8,445 families.

The population density was 3,357.4 per square mile (1,296.3/km^{2}). There were 14,594 housing units at an average density of 1,379.9 per square mile (532.8/km^{2}).

Of the 13,793 households, 30.7% had children under the age of 18; 42.8% were married-couple households; 19.5% were households with a male householder and no spouse or partner present; and 30.1% were households with a female householder and no spouse or partner present. About 31.7% of households were made up of individuals, and 14.7% had someone living alone who was 65 years of age or older. The average household size was 2.5 and the average family size was 3.2.

23.3% of residents were under the age of 18, 9.1% from 18 to 24, 26.8% from 25 to 44, 22.3% from 45 to 64, and 18.5% were 65 years of age or older. The median age was 37.5 years. For every 100 females there were 96.1 males, and for every 100 females age 18 and over there were 92.6 males age 18 and over.

About 99.7% of residents lived in urban areas, while 0.3% lived in rural areas.

Racial composition as of the 2020 census
Race	Number	Percent
White	23,390	65.9%
Black or African American	182	0.5%
American Indian and Alaska Native	497	1.4%
Asian	465	1.3%
Native Hawaiian and Other Pacific Islander	64	0.2%
Some other race	6,701	18.9%
Two or more races	4,209	11.9%
Hispanic or Latino (of any race)	11,571	32.6%

=== Education ===
According to the 2020 American Community Survey 5-year estimates, 16.7% of residents held a bachelor's degree or higher.

=== 2010 census ===
As of the 2010 census, there were 31,925 people, 12,379 households, and 7,721 families residing in the city. The population density was 4,108.8 inhabitants per square mile (1,586.4/km^{2}). There were 13,175 housing units at an average density of 1,695.6 per square mile (654.7/km^{2}). The racial makeup of the city was 76.7% White, 0.4% African American, 1.2% Native American, 1.1% Asian, 0.2% Pacific Islander, 17.3% from other races, and 3.1% from two or more races. Hispanic or Latino people were 29.4% of the population.

There were 12,379 households, of which 33.4% had children under the age of 18 living with them, 44.6% were married couples living together, 11.9% had a female householder with no husband present, 5.8% had a male householder with no wife present, and 37.6% were non-families. 31.2% of all households were made up of individuals, and 14.2% had someone living alone who was 65 years of age or older. The average household size was 2.53 and the average family size was 3.19.

The median age in the city was 35.2 years. 26.1% of residents were under the age of 18; 10% were between the ages of 18 and 24; 25.2% were from 25 to 44; 23.4% were from 45 to 64; and 15.2% were 65 years of age or older. The gender makeup of the city was 48.9% male and 51.1% female.

=== 2000 census ===
As of the 2000 census, there were 27,856 people, 10,741 households, and 6,884 families residing in the city. The population density was 4,049.6 people per square mile (1,563.3/km^{2}). There were 11,486 housing units at an average density of 1,669.8 per square mile (644.6/km^{2}). The racial makeup of the city was 80.93% White, 0.39% African American, 1.13% Native American, 0.95% Asian, 0.13% Pacific Islander, 13.99% from other races, and 2.48% from two or more races. Hispanic or Latino were 21.52% of the population.

There were 10,741 households, out of which 33.4% had children under the age of 18 living with them, 49.4% were married couples living together, 10.2% had a female householder with no husband present, and 35.9% were non-families. 30.1% of all households were made up of individuals, and 13.4% had someone living alone who was 65 years of age or older. The average household size was 2.53 and the average family size was 3.17.

In the city, the age distribution of the population shows 27.4% under the age of 18, 10.0% from 18 to 24, 28.3% from 25 to 44, 19.3% from 45 to 64, and 15.0% who were 65 years of age or older. The median age was 34 years. For every 100 females, there were 95.6 males. For every 100 females age 18 and over, there were 92.8 males.

The median income for a household in the city was $34,897, and the median income for a family was $45,982. Males had a median income of $35,245 versus $26,062 for females. The per capita income for the city was $19,498. About 10.6% of families and 15.3% of the population were below the poverty line, including 19.7% of those under age 18 and 5.7% of those age 65 or over.

== Arts and culture ==
The Wenatchee post office contains an oil on canvas mural, The Saga of Wenatchee, painted in 1940 by Peggy Strong. Murals were produced from 1934 to 1943 in the United States through the Section of Painting and Sculpture, later called the Section of Fine Arts, of the Treasury Department. The WPA was the largest and most ambitious American New Deal agency, employing individuals to carry out public works projects.

Wenatchee is home to many performing arts groups including the Wenatchee Valley Symphony, Wenatchee Big Band, Columbia Chorale, Wenatchee Valley Appleaires and The Apollo Club. Music Theater of Wenatchee, Stage Kids, and several other theatre companies offer stage productions year-round. Wenatchee also is home to Mariachi Huenachi, a much-celebrated mariachi program in the Wenatchee School District which performed at the US Capitol for National Hispanic Heritage Month in 2017. The group was featured in a 2018 TVW documentary.

The Town Toyota Center has featured high school mariachi ensembles from across the region. Mariachi Sol De Mexico gives clinics to high school musicians and gives an evening concert sometimes featuring famous musical artists.

== Sports ==
=== Professional sports ===
==== Current teams ====
Club	Sport	League	Venue	Established	Championships
Wenatchee AppleSox	Baseball	West Coast League	Paul Thomas Sr. Field	2000	6
Wenatchee All-Stars Football Club	Soccer	Western Washington Premier League	Mike Hollis Field at WVC	2019	1
Wenatchee Bighorns	Basketball	The Basketball League	Town Toyota Center	2022	0
Wenatchee Valley Skyhawks	Arena football	American West Football Conference	Town Toyota Center	2019	0
Wenatchee Wild	Ice hockey	Western Hockey League	Town Toyota Center	2023	0

==== Former teams ====
Club	Sport	League	Venue	Folded
Wenatchee Chiefs	Baseball	Northwest League	Recreation Park	1965
Wenatchee Valley Venom	Arena football	Indoor Football League	Town Toyota Center	2011
Wenatchee Fire FC	Indoor soccer	Premier Arena Soccer League	Wenatchee Valley Sportsplex	2015
Wenatchee FC	Soccer	Evergreen Premier League	Apple Bowl	2016
Wenatchee Valley Rams	Football	Washington Football League	Wildcat Stadium	2018

=== Amateur sports ===
Club	Sport	League	Venue
Wenatchee FC Youth	Soccer		Wenatchee Valley Sportsplex
Wenatchee Figure Skating Club	Figure skating	United States Figure Skating Association	Town Toyota Center
Wenatchee Curling Club	Curling	United States Curling Association	Town Toyota Center
Wenatchee Wolves	Ice hockey	Northern Pacific Hockey League	Town Toyota Center
Wenatchee Jr. Wild	Ice hockey	USA Hockey	Town Toyota Center
Wenatchee Banshees Women's Hockey	Ice hockey	USA Hockey	Town Toyota Center
Wenatchee Banshees Men's Hockey	Ice hockey	USA Hockey	Town Toyota Center
Wenatchee Packers	Baseball	American Legion	Recreation Park

The Wenatchee Valley Super Oval in East Wenatchee is a quarter-mile-long banked asphalt oval used for local racing.

In the fall of 2008, the Town Toyota Center was completed, and hosts some professional and junior professional sporting events, in addition to touring events and expositions, and the 2010 NAHL Pepsi Robertson Cup.

== Parks and recreation ==
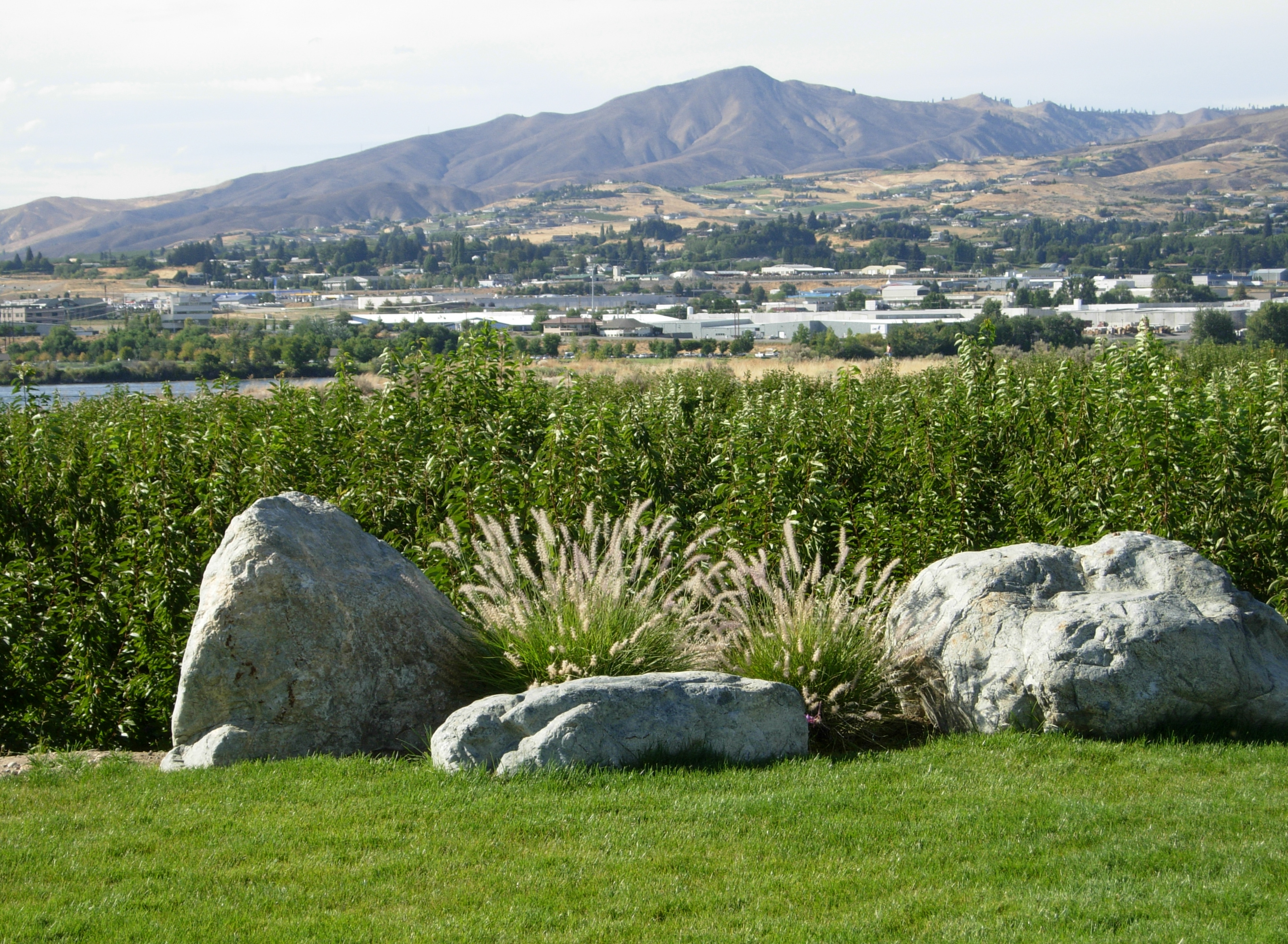
Burch Mountain above Wenatchee

The Wenatchee Valley and the surrounding areas provide an abundance of sports and recreational activities for any season. There are several facilities including the WRAC tennis club, an Olympic size swimming pool, an ice arena, several 18-hole and 9-hole golf courses, a 9-hole disc golf course, and countless baseball diamonds and soccer fields as well as two skateboard parks. As of 2023, Pickleball is also becoming extremely popular with multiple parks providing outside play in the Valley as well as indoor play. There are many places to hike, fish and hunt for both birds and larger game. Boating and water recreation are also quite common. Many kayak, windsurf and water-ski on the Columbia. Whitewater rafting and inner-tubing is frequent on the Wenatchee River. In the winter, the mountains near Wenatchee provide great snowmobiling, sledding at Squilchuck State Park, as well as skiing and snowboarding at Mission Ridge (30 minutes drive) and Stevens Pass (1 hour and a half drive). Nordic skiing is available at the Stevens Pass Nordic Center, Leavenworth (25 minute drive), and the Methow Valley (1 hour and 45 minute drive).

The city also offers a large system of parks and paved trails known as the Apple Capital Recreation Loop Trail. The 10-mile (16 km) loop along both banks of the Columbia River is used by cyclists, walkers, joggers, and skaters. A project to extend the eastern segment of the trail 5 miles (8.0 km) north to Lincoln Rock State Park was completed on July 9, 2015. An additional 3.2-mile (5.1 km) extension on the east side runs south to Kirby Billingsley Hydro Park. A short extension slated for completion in Fall 2017 is planned from the west end of the Odabashian bridge to the corner of Easy Street and the highway. In the winter, cross-country skiers and snowshoers also use the trail. The trail connects in the south at the historic Columbia River Bridge, also known as the pipeline bridge, and in the north at the Richard Odabashian Bridge. It passes through Wenatchee Confluence State Park. Much of the hillside areas surrounding the city of Wenatchee have been purchased by or have their rights held by the Chelan-Douglas Land Trust which protects them as a natural resource and as a site for hiking in the foothills.

== Government and politics ==
Wenatchee has a non-partisan mayor–council form of government, with five council members elected in districts and the mayor and two council positions elected at-large. The terms are staggered four-year terms elected in November of odd years. The current mayor of Wenatchee is Mike Poirier, who was first elected in 2023.

The city lies within the 8th congressional district, which includes all of Chelan County and crosses the Cascades to the rural areas of King, Pierce, and Snohomish counties. The district was enlarged to include Chelan County during the 2012 redistricting; Wenatchee was previously part of the 4th congressional district. The city is also within the 7th legislative district, which has two state representatives and one state senator. Wenatchee was part of the 12th legislative district with the rest of Chelan County until it was redrawn in 2024 to comply with a U.S. District Court order for districts in Yakima County.

Public safety in Wenatchee is provided by three law enforcement agencies (Wenatchee Police Department, Chelan County Sheriff's Office, and the Washington State Patrol), one fire department (Chelan County Fire District No. 1), and two private ambulance companies (Ballard Ambulance and Lifeline Ambulance). East Wenatchee Police and Douglas County Fire District No. 2 (East Wenatchee) also assist with police and fire protection services within the city through mutual aid agreements. On September 30, 2022, The Chelan County Fire District #1 and the Douglas County Fire District #2 joined to form one agency known as the Wenatchee Valley Fire Department with Regional Fire Authority in the Wenatchee Valley.

== Education ==
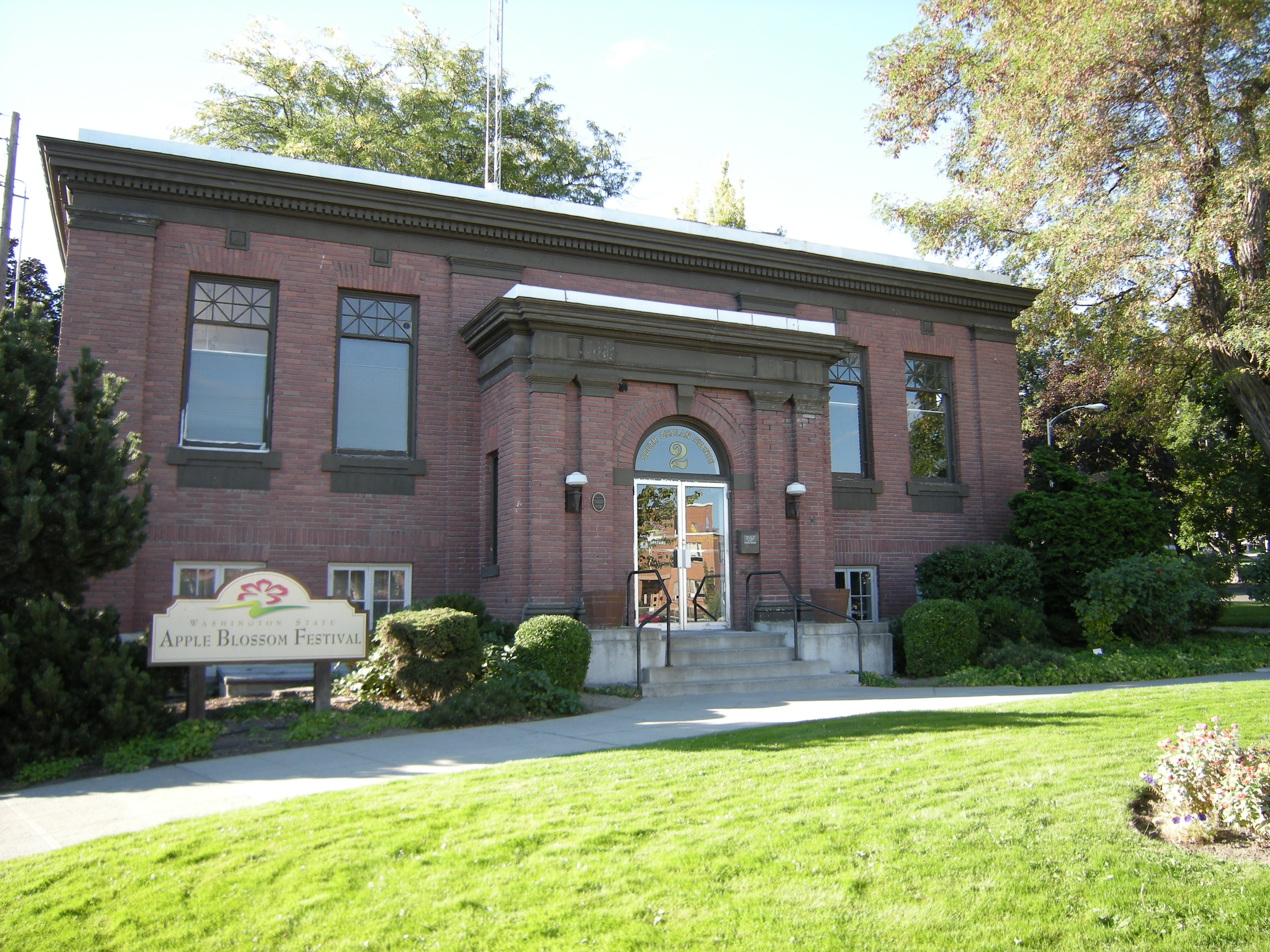
The former Carnegie Library, also listed on the NRHP, is now home to the Washington State Apple Blossom Festival.

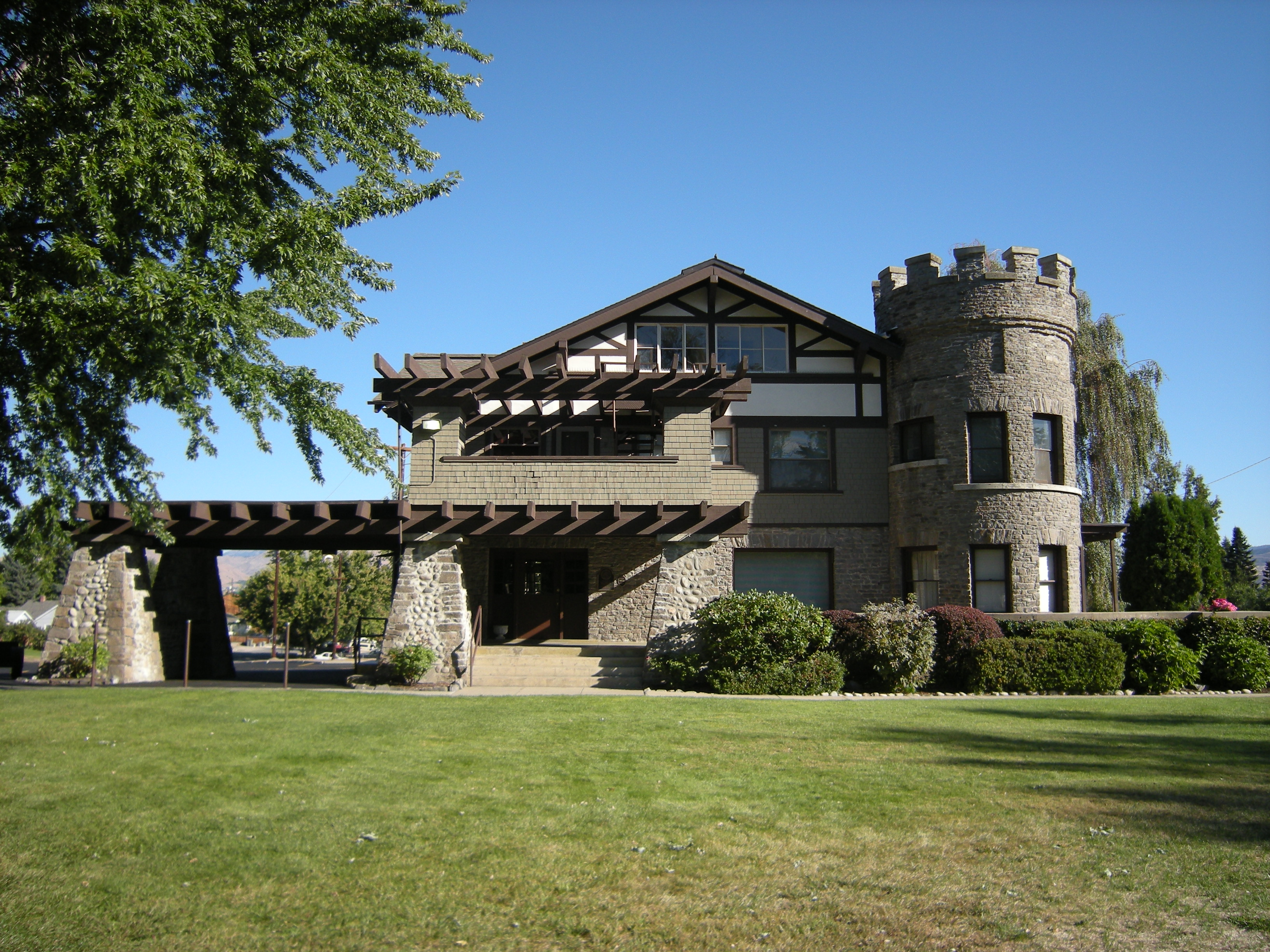
Wells House, another NRHP building. Its former grounds are now home to Wenatchee Valley College.

Public K-12 education in Wenatchee is provided by the Wenatchee School District, which also serves the communities of Malaga, Olds Station, South Wenatchee, Sunnyslope, and Wenatchee Heights. The city has seven elementary schools, three middle schools, and one high school (Wenatchee High School). The Wenatchee School District voted to close Columbia Elementary at the end of the 2024 School year reducing the number of elementary schools to six. The School District also maintains WestSide High School, an alternative high school, and the Valley Academy of Learning, which is an alternative education program where parents play the active role in education of their children.

In 2006, the Wenatchee School District began offering students of Wenatchee High School and WestSide High School the ability to take selected classes online at the Wenatchee Internet Academy. These classes employ use of Moodle and Blackboard software packages for managing the distance-learning program. All classes are designed by educators at Wenatchee High School and operated by local instructors within the Wenatchee School District.

The city also has several private schools, most of which are religious: Children's Gate Montessori School, Cascade Christian Academy, The River Academy, St. Joseph Catholic School, and St. Paul's Lutheran School.

=== Higher education ===
Wenatchee is also the home of the North Central Educational Service District, serving all of north-central Washington, and the Wenatchee Valley College, a two-year community college with its main campus in Wenatchee and a satellite campus in Omak, Washington. Its main campus has an average student population of 3500 of all ages. Wenatchee Valley College has one of the largest community college service areas in the State of Washington, covering more than 10,000 square miles (30,000 km^{2}).

The Washington State University is represented in Wenatchee by the Tree Fruit Research and Extension Center, the North Central Washington Learning Center, and Chelan Co. Cooperative Extension.

== Transportation ==
The city is served by U.S. Route 2 passing by in Sunnyslope, less than a mile north of city limits. U.S. Route 97 also passes north of the city, while State Route 28 passes through East Wenatchee just across the river.

Columbia River can be crossed by three bridges: the Richard Odabashian Bridge and the Senator George Sellar Bridge for motor vehicles, and the Old Wenatchee Bridge for pedestrians.

=== Public transportation ===
Transit services within Wenatchee is provided by Link Transit, which serves all of Chelan County and parts of Douglas County. Link Transit also runs commuter bus service from Wenatchee to many outlying communities in the region, including Leavenworth and Chelan. The agency adopted its first electric buses with batteries in 2014, running on three trolley routes in Wenatchee branded as "The Current". In 2021 Link Transit moved to a "fare free" model and every trip is now "zero fare". In 2024, Link Transit was awarded grant funding to implement a 100% electric transit fleet (fixed urban routes) by 2026 including construction of a new bus garage facility to support the vehicles.

Columbia Station, the city's Amtrak station, is also served by intercity coach buses from Greyhound, the Washington State Department of Transportation's AppleLine, and Northwestern Trailways.

=== Aviation ===
The city is served by Pangborn Memorial Airport which is located about five miles to the east, and supports commercial flights from Wenatchee to and from Seattle on Alaska Air. In 2023, Alaska Air began flying jet aircraft (replacing turbo prop aircraft) into Pangborn (EAT). Runway and Terminal improvements are expected to allow larger jet aircraft to service the airport in the future, and there is an ongoing campaign to spur Airline interest into providing routes and service to the California Bay Area.

=== Railroad ===
Wenatchee is in the major railroad line of the BNSF Railway (formerly Great Northern Railway) to Seattle. Wenatchee was once the eastern terminus of the Great Northern electric-driven train service (1928/1929–1956) on its New Cascade Tunnel route via the Chumstick Valley, which went all the way to Skykomish. There, steam locomotives or diesel locomotives replaced electric locomotives along this route, as well as having a maintenance base for the electric locomotives. Today, Amtrak's Empire Builder passenger train serves Wenatchee at Columbia Station. The Cascade and Columbia River short line freight railroad interfaces with BNSF in Wenatchee, and runs north to Okanogan and further north to Oroville.

On August 6, 1974, a tank car belonging to Burlington Northern (now BNSF) exploded in the Appleyard Terminal in south Wenatchee, killing 2 people.

== Notable people ==
- Gary J. Coleman (b. 1941), Mormon leader
- Chris DeGarmo (b. 1963), member of the heavy metal band, Queensrÿche, born in Wenatchee
- Tyler Farrar (b. 1984), pro tour cyclist, born and raised in Wenatchee
- Dan Hamilton (1946-1994), lead singer for Hamilton, Joe Frank & Reynolds was raised in Wenatchee
- Susan Hart (b.1941), actress and producer
- Brad Lamm (b.1966), educator and author born in Wenatchee
- Don Lanphere (1928–2003), jazz saxophonist, born in Wenatchee
- Noreen Nash (b. 1924-2023), actress, born in Wenatchee
- Casey Parsons (b. 1954), baseball player, born in Wenatchee
- Joseph Rose (b. 1969), award-winning journalist, Episcopal priest and theologian, born and grew up in Wenatchee
- Bud Sagendorf (1915–1994), cartoonist known for drawing Popeye, born in Wenatchee
- Heidi Schreck (b. 1971), actress and playwright, grew up in Wenatchee.
- Kurt Schulz (b. 1968), NFL player who played for the Buffalo Bills and Detroit Lions, born in Wenatchee
- Hailey Van Lith (b. 2001), college basketball player, born and raised in Wenatchee
- Sammy Charles White, (1927–1991), baseball player, born in Wenatchee
- Elizabeth Zharoff (b. 1986), opera singer, voice teacher, and YouTuber (The Charismatic Voice), born and raised in Wenatchee

== Sister cities ==
Wenatchee has four sister cities:

- Kuroishi, Japan
- Misawa, Japan
- Tynda, Russia
- Naju, South Korea

== See also ==
- Wenatchee Dome
