= Wenatchee River =

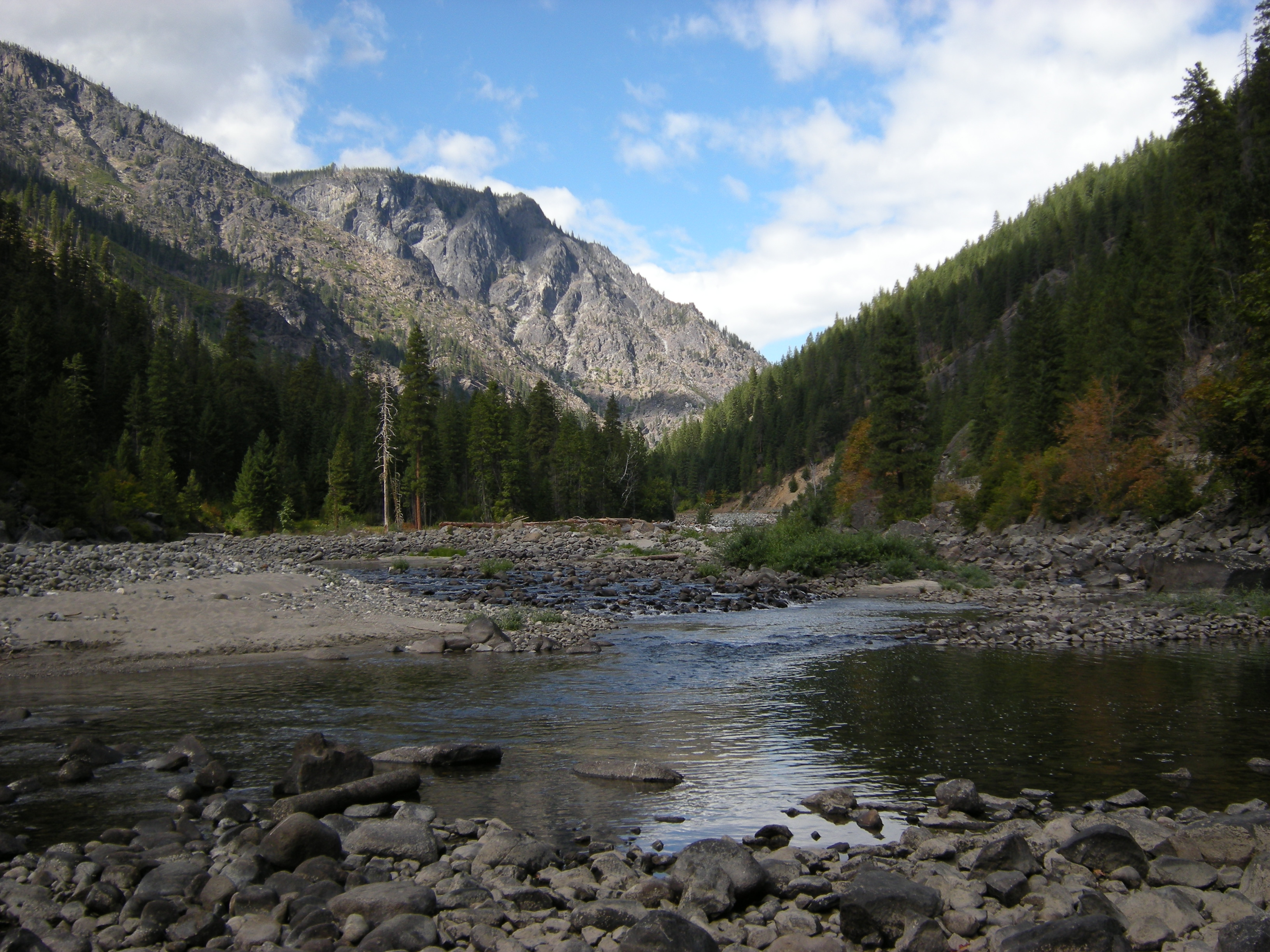
- The Wenatchee River west of Leavenworth

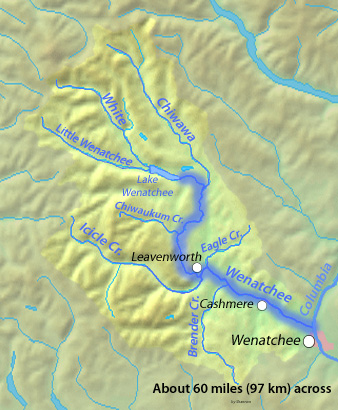
- Map of the Wenatchee River

- Mouth of the Wenatchee River in Washington

Location
- Country: United States
- State: Washington
- County: Chelan

Physical characteristics
- Source: Lake Wenatchee
  - coordinates: 47°48′28″N 120°43′39″W
- Mouth: Columbia River
  - location: Wenatchee
  - coordinates: 47°27′19″N 120°19′28″W
- Length: 53 mi (85 km)
- Basin size: 1,333 sq mi (3,450 km^{2})
- Discharge
  - location: river mile 7 at Monitor
  - average: 3,231 cu ft/s (91.5 m^{3}/s)
  - minimum: 221 cu ft/s (6.3 m^{3}/s)
  - maximum: 45,200 cu ft/s (1,280 m^{3}/s)

The Wenatchee River is a river in the U.S. state of Washington, originating at Lake Wenatchee and flowing southeast for 53 miles (85 km), emptying into the Columbia River immediately north of Wenatchee, Washington. On its way it passes the towns of Plain, Leavenworth, Peshastin, Dryden, Cashmere, Monitor, and Wenatchee, all within Chelan County. The river attracts kayaking and river rafting enthusiasts and tourism.

Tributaries include the Chiwawa River, Nason Creek, Peshastin Creek, and Icicle Creek. Its drainage basin is 1,333 square miles (3,450 km^{2}) in area.

== History ==
Historically the dividing line between Okanogan County and Kittitas County, the river has been in the center of Chelan County since the county's formation around 1899.

Water from the Wenatchee River and its tributaries has been diverted for irrigation since 1891, mainly for orchards. There are two small dams on the Wenatchee River, the Tumwater Canyon Dam, which sits just west of the community of Leavenworth, and the Dryden dam, a low-head dam situated just outside the town of Dryden. The Tumwater Canyon dam originally provided power to the original 2-mile (3.2 km)-long railroad tunnel used near Stevens Pass to get trains across the Cascade Mountains, it was later (starting in 1928) used to power the railroad's electrification from Wenatchee to Skykomish.

== Pollution ==
Toxic chemicals banned decades ago in Washington continue to linger in the environment and concentrate in the food chain, threatening people and the environment, according to three recent studies by the Washington state Department of Ecology. In 2007, the Washington Department of Health advised the public to not eat mountain whitefish from the Wenatchee River from Leavenworth downstream to where the river joins the Columbia, due to unhealthy levels of PCBs.

== See also ==
- List of rivers of Washington (state)
- Tributaries of the Columbia River
