= Columbia Station (Washington) =

Railway station in Wenatchee, United States

Columbia Station Wenatchee, WA
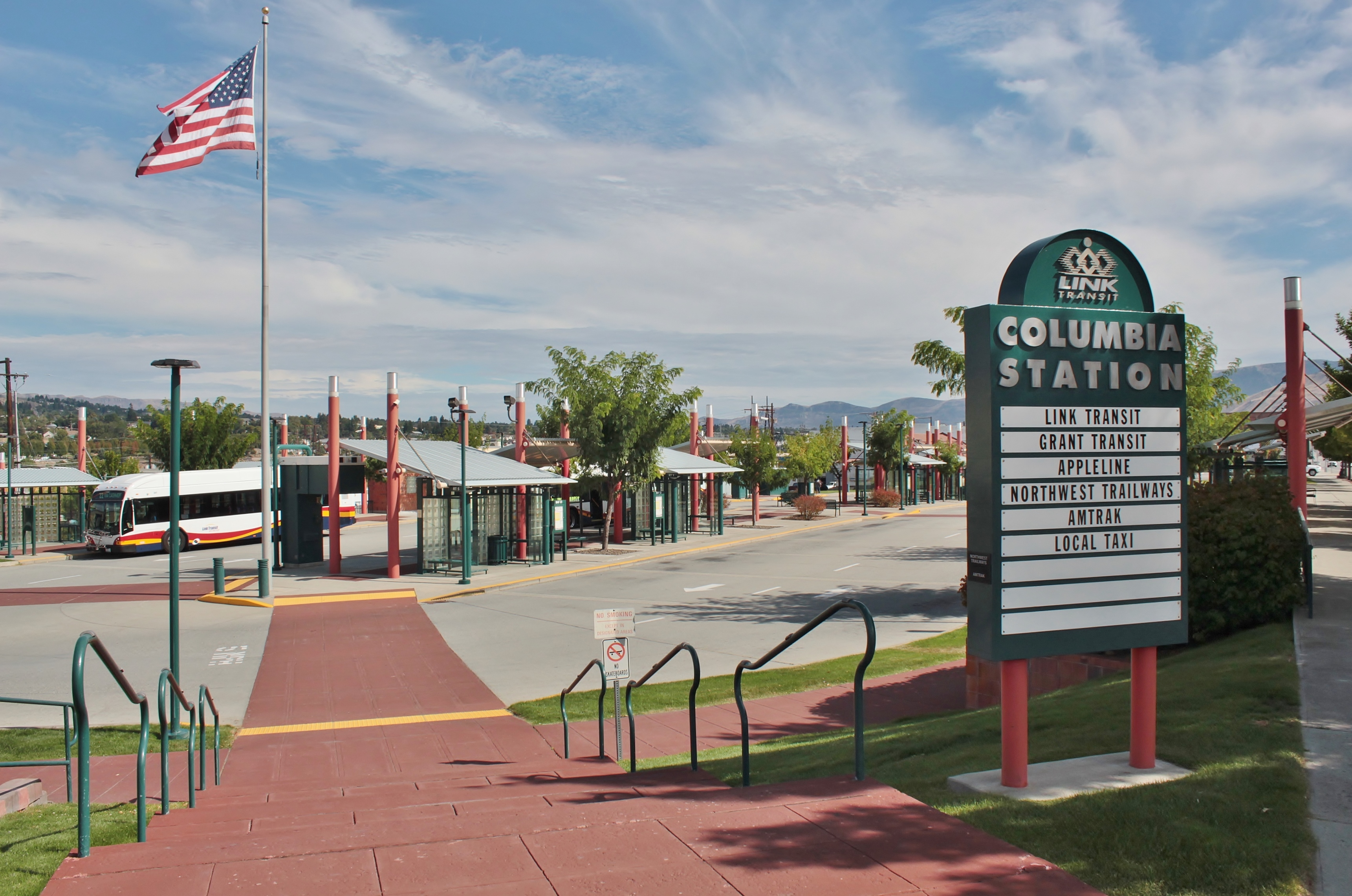
- Bus bays at Columbia Station

General information
- Location: 300 South Columbia Street; Wenatchee, Washington; United States
- Coordinates: 47°25′15″N 120°18′27″W
- Owner: Link Transit
- Line: BNSF Columbia River / Scenic Subdivisions
- Platforms: 1 side platform
- Tracks: 2
- Bus stands: 19
- Bus operators: Link Transit, Grant Transit Authority, Northwestern Trailways, Travel Washington

Construction
- Parking: 67 short-term stalls
- Accessible: Yes

Other information
- Station code: Amtrak: WEN

History
- Opened: October 25, 1981
- Rebuilt: 1997–1998

Passengers
- FY 2025: 12,512 (Amtrak)

Services
Preceding station	Amtrak	Following station
Leavenworth toward Seattle	Empire Builder	Ephrata toward Chicago
Former services
Preceding station	Amtrak	Following station
Everett toward Seattle	North Coast Hiawatha	Ephrata toward Chicago
Everett toward Seattle	Expo '74	Ephrata toward Spokane
Preceding station	Great Northern Railway	Following station
Monitor toward Seattle	Main Line	Malaga toward St. Paul
Terminus	Wenatchee – Mansfield	Malaga toward Mansfield
Olda toward Oroville	Oroville – Wenatchee	Terminus
Location

Columbia Station, also known as Wenatchee station, is an intermodal train and bus station in Wenatchee, Washington, United States. It is a stop on Amtrak's Empire Builder train and is the main hub for Link Transit, the local bus system serving Wenatchee and surrounding areas. The station is also served by intercity buses operated by Grant Transit Authority, Northwestern Trailways, and Travel Washington.

The station is located at the site of an earlier depot built by the Great Northern Railway in 1910. Amtrak service to Wenatchee began in 1973 with the short-lived North Coast Hiawatha, which ceased operations in 1979. It was followed by the relocated Empire Builder in October 1981, which stopped at a temporary platform on the site of the demolished depot. Columbia Station was opened for bus services on July 13, 1997, and a new Amtrak platform opened a year later in June 1998 following construction delays.

== Description ==
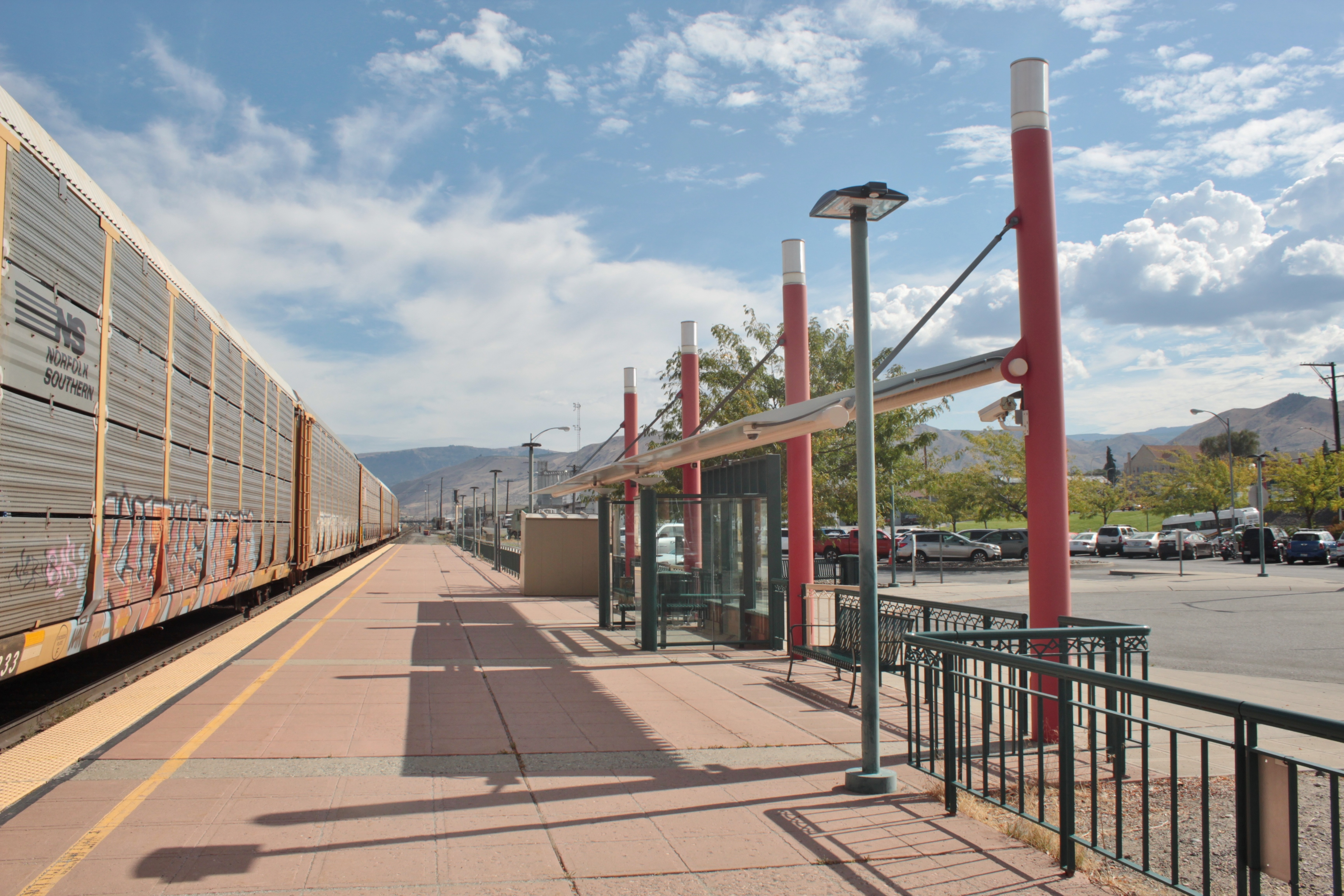
The train platform at Columbia Station, served by Amtrak's Empire Builder

Columbia Station spans two city blocks in downtown Wenatchee, bound to the west by Wenatchee Avenue and to the north by Kittitas Street. The bus platforms are located on the west half of the complex, consisting of 16 bays arranged around a loop and central island, including an electric bus charger. The three-story station building is located in the northeast corner of the block and includes the Link Transit guest services center, a passenger waiting room, offices, public restrooms, and a cafe. A set of separate bus bays are located on Columbia Street and are used by intercity buses. The 400-foot-long (120 m) train platform is located across Columbia Street from the rest of the complex, adjacent to a park and ride lot with 67 stalls. Link Transit owns the building, bus bays, and parking lot, while BNSF Railway owns the train platform and other facilities. The Apple Capital Recreation Loop Trail runs a block to the east of the train platform on the banks of the Columbia River.

The station has several pieces of public artwork designed by local residents and schoolchildren in 1997. The building lobby has a large panoramic mural by Jan Cook Mack that depicts the Wenatchee Valley from Burch Mountain. The wall of the outer bus platform has 276 ceramic tiles painted by elementary school students from eight school districts within the Link Transit service area. The shelters above the bus bays have eight stainless steel funnels sculpted by Terry Valdez that use ethnic imagery and symbolism to represent the Wenatchee Valley. The station also has a 9-foot (2.7 m), four-sided street clock that is located at the corner of Kittitas Street and Wenatchee Avenue.

== History ==
=== Great Northern depot ===
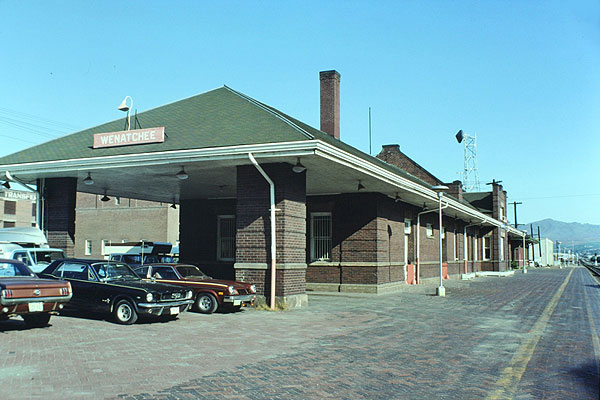
The Great Northern depot in Wenatchee, photographed before its demolition

The modern settlement of Wenatchee began in 1890 with real estate developers planning a town along the proposed route of the Seattle, Lake Shore and Eastern Railway, which was never completed. The Great Northern Railway arrived in the area on October 17, 1892, and completed its railroad over Stevens Pass to Seattle the following year. The town's Great Northern depot was originally located at Columbia Street and First Street, near the center of the original plat, but was deemed too small to handle both passenger and freight uses. The railroad announced plans in May 1906 to build a new depot to the south at Kittitas Street exclusively for passenger services.

In April 1909, Great Northern filed plans to build a $50,000 depot at Columbia Street and Orondo Avenue, located between Kittitas and First streets, with additional tracks in a city-owned alley. The plan was opposed by property owners on Orondo Avenue who would be removed to make way for the depot and new tracks. Great Northern announced the following month that they would use the Kittitas Street site for the depot, for which the Wenatchee city council granted a franchise. Construction of the new depot began in June with excavation for a basement heating plant, and moved to above-ground construction by August. A section of track was raised two feet (0.61 m) by Great Northern to bring trains to platform level for the new depot, which would use granite and brick masonry.

The new depot was substantially completed in October 1909, along with an underpass for Kittitas Street, a new roundhouse, and freight facilities at the old depot. The Great Northern depot cost $100,000 to construct and was opened on February 11, 1910, on the same day as Wenatchee's new commercial club and high school. All three dedications were attended by officials from the city, Great Northern, as well as Governor Marion E. Hay. The station building measured 156 feet (48 m) long and 33 feet (10 m) wide with a 500-foot (150 m) covered platform. The interior had two waiting rooms with oak furniture, electric lighting, and a dining area.

=== Amtrak and Link Transit ===
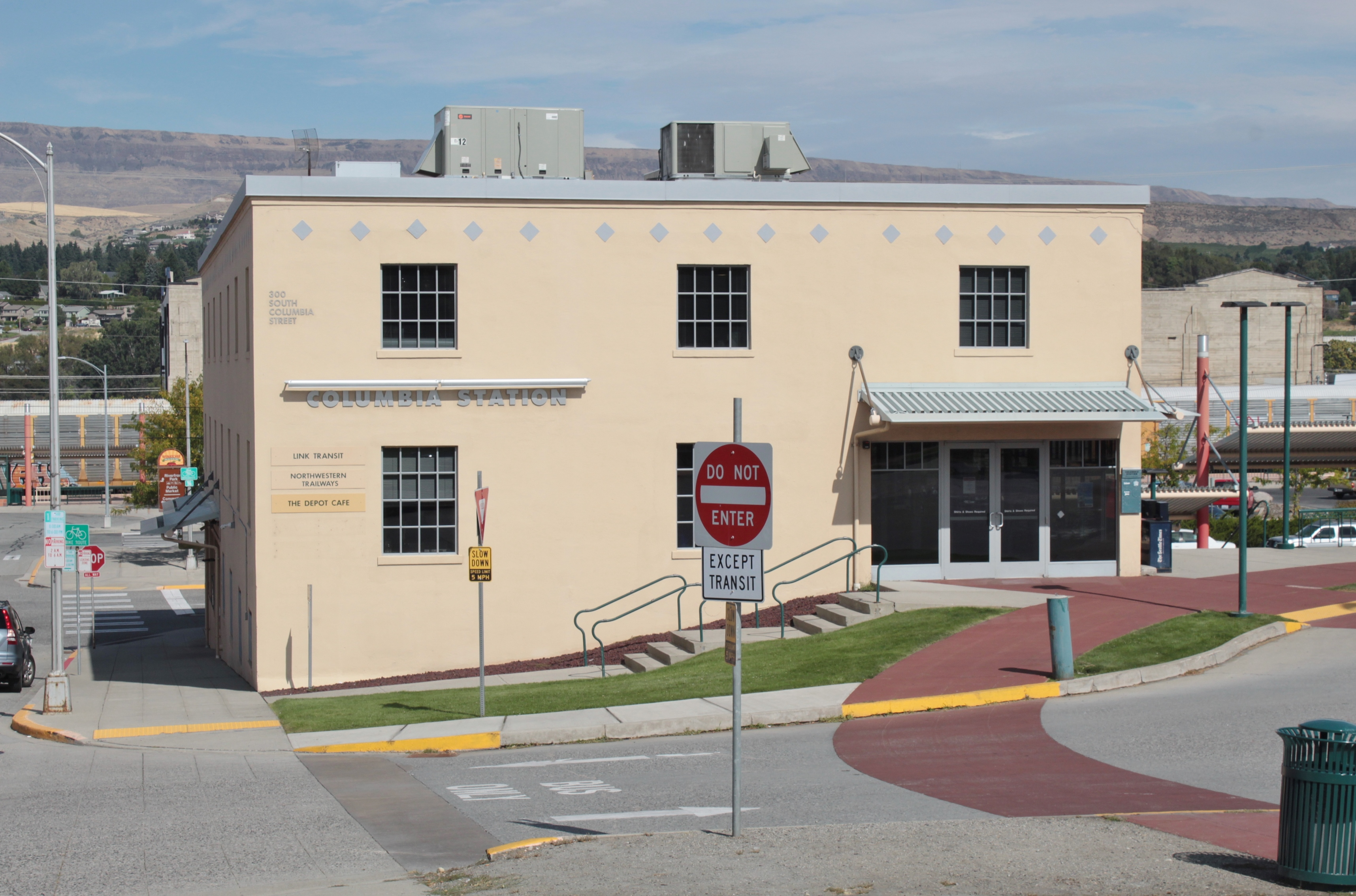
The station building at Columbia Station, renovated in 1997

Amtrak took over passenger rail operations from Burlington Northern (which Great Northern was merged into) on May 1, 1971. The Empire Builder was moved to the former Northern Pacific Railway route between Seattle and Spokane via Stampede Pass, leaving Wenatchee without passenger rail service. On June 13, 1973, Amtrak restored passenger rail service to Wenatchee by moving the tri-weekly North Coast Hiawatha to the Stevens Pass route. During the 1974 World's Fair, hosted in Spokane, Amtrak ran a daytime train along the North Coast Hiawatha route that stopped in Wenatchee and Ephrata. The North Coast Hiawatha was discontinued by Amtrak in October 1979 as part of national cuts to low-performing corridors, blamed in part by poor scheduling and reliability issues.

The Great Northern depot was demolished by Burlington Northern in August 1981, citing the costs of maintaining the historic building. Amtrak restored rail service to Wenatchee a second time on October 25, 1981, by rerouting the Empire Builder over Stevens Pass and installed a plastic shelter at Kittitas Street to serve as a temporary station. The city government began lobbying Amtrak and Burlington Northern for the construction of a permanent passenger rail station adjacent to the Wenatchee Convention Center on First Street.

The newly created Link Transit began planning of a downtown intermodal transit center in 1992 with a federal grant, favoring the convention center site and the adjacent Casscadian Building. The plan for an intermodal transit center received support from Amtrak, Burlington Northern, private bus operators, and local businesses owners as a replacement for the existing Amtrak facility and temporary downtown transfer center for Link Transit. Link Transit proposed a $10.2 million facility for buses and trains that would also include a pedestrian bridge from the convention center to Wenatchee Riverfront Park and a small park and ride lot.

The use of the Casscadian Building on Mission Street for the transit center came into question in April 1994 after a state historic preservationist determined that the building was eligible to be listed as a historic landmark, as it was a surviving example of early parking garage design. After outcry over the project's budget and a plan to condemn an adjacent parking lot, Link Transit began considering a new site for the facility that would be eligible for state and federal funding. Burlington Northern offered the city government an annual lease of $1 for the site of the old depot at Kittitas Street if it were to be used for a transit center. Link Transit adopted the Kittitas Street site as the preferred location of its Wenatchee transit center, along with a block to the west that would be largely demolished.

Several options for the Kittitas Street site were considered by Link Transit, including a separate waiting area for Amtrak passengers and the orientation of the bus bays. The project was approved by Link Transit in September 1995, with a cost of $8.2 million that would be partially covered by a federal grant. By the following year, Link Transit had acquired the property needed for the transit center for $1.5 million, including an existing three-story building that would be renovated for use by passengers, and named the project "Columbia Station". Link Transit and Wenatchee broke ground on the new Columbia Station on August 23, 1996, after the Franklin House was demolished. Construction costs for the project were lower than expected, allowing for Link Transit to re-add several decorative features that had been deferred in the planning process, including the street clock.

Columbia Station was dedicated and opened to service on July 13, 1997, with 500 people in attendance and speeches from local officials. Northwestern Trailways was the first intercity operator to use the facility, having moved from their old depot at First Street and Chelan Street. The rebuilding of the Amtrak platform was scheduled to be completed in tandem with the bus station, but was delayed while waiting for finalization of the lease agreement with BNSF Railway. Construction began in October 1997 on the new platform, three waiting shelters, and a parking lot. The new platform was dedicated on June 26, 1998, shortly after it was opened for use by passengers. Columbia Station underwent a minor renovation in 2018 that added a new comfort station for drivers and remodeled Link Transit's administrative offices on the third floor.

== Services ==
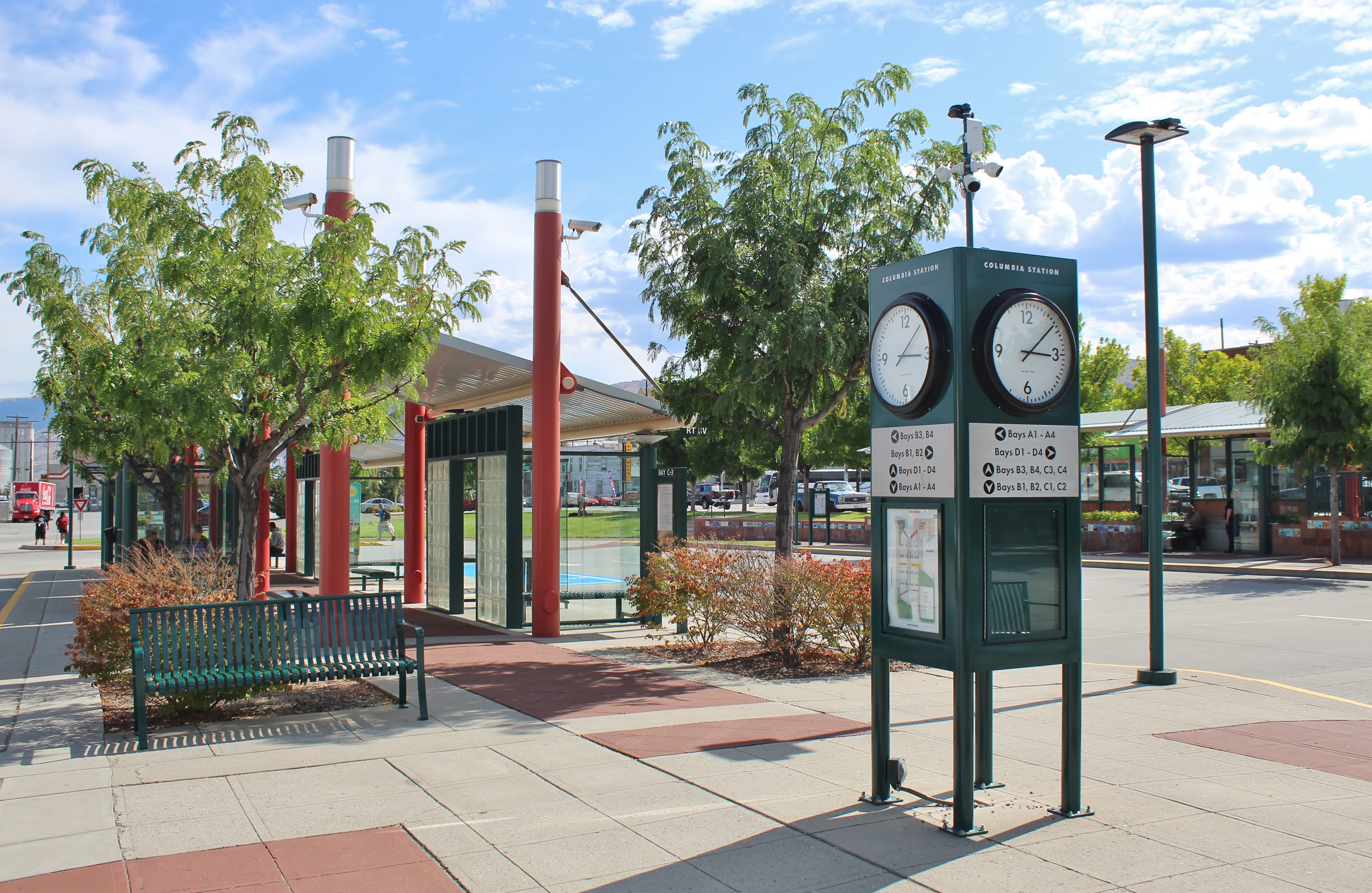
The central bus platform at Columbia Station

Columbia Station is the main hub for Link Transit, a regional bus system that serves Wenatchee and other communities in Chelan and Douglas counties. The transit system operates intercity routes and local service from the station, including frequent shuttles that use electric buses and seasonal winter service to Mission Ridge Ski Area. Columbia Station is also served by two daily Amtrak trains on the Empire Builder, a transcontinental route connecting to Seattle, Spokane, and Chicago. The next stops on the Empire Builder are Icicle Station in Leavenworth to the west and Ephrata station to the east.

In addition to Link Transit, the station is also served by several intercity bus routes from other operators that use the lower bus bays on Columbia Street or other parts of the facility. The Travel Washington Apple Line provides daily service from Wenatchee to Omak and Ellensburg. The Grant Transit Authority formerly ran buses on weekdays from Wenatchee to Moses Lake until 2021. Private coach operator Northwestern Trailways has an office at the station and runs daily buses from Wenatchee to Omak, Ellensburg, Everett, Seattle, Tacoma, and Spokane. The Wenatchee Valley Shuttle provides service to Seattle–Tacoma International Airport from the park and ride lot at Columbia Station's train platform.
