= Ephrata station =

Train station in Ephrata, Washington, U.S.

Ephrata, WA
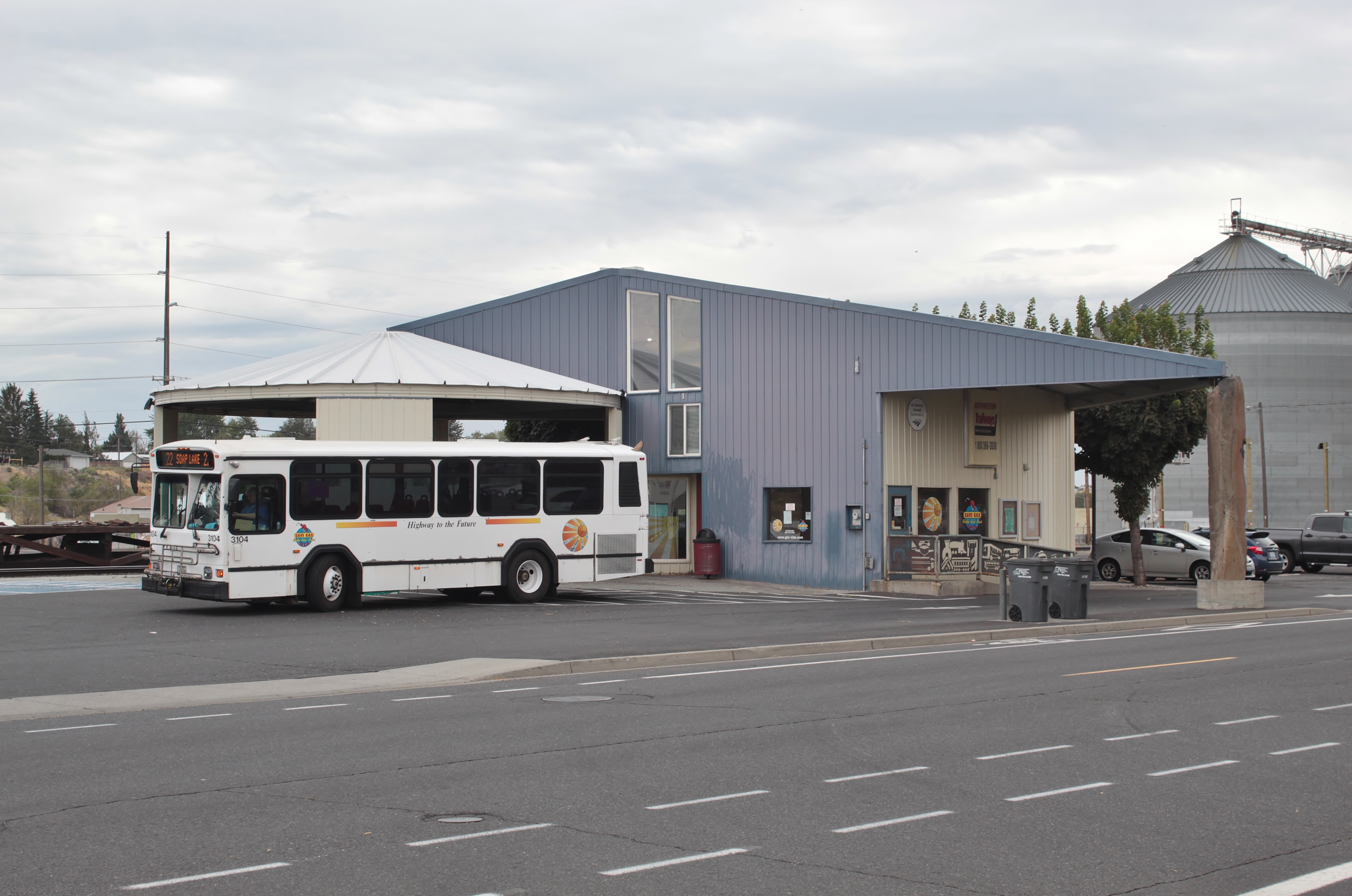
- Ephrata station with Grant Transit Authority bus

General information
- Location: 24 Alder Street; Ephrata, Washington; United States
- Coordinates: 47.32089°N 119.54935°W
- Owner: City of Ephrata
- Line: BNSF Columbia River Subdivision
- Platforms: 1 side platform
- Tracks: 2
- Connections: Amtrak Thruway; Grant Transit Authority; Northwestern Trailways

Construction
- Parking: Yes

Other information
- Station code: Amtrak: EPH

History
- Rebuilt: 1994

Passengers
- FY 2025: 3,727 (Amtrak)

Services
Preceding station	Amtrak	Following station
Wenatchee toward Seattle	Empire Builder	Spokane toward Chicago
Former services
Preceding station	Amtrak	Following station
Wenatchee toward Seattle	North Coast Hiawatha	Spokane toward Chicago
Wenatchee toward Seattle	Expo '74	Spokane Terminus
Location

Ephrata is a train station on Amtrak's Empire Builder line in Ephrata, Washington. The station and parking are owned by the city government, while the track and platforms are owned by BNSF Railway. Northwestern Trailways provides inter-city bus transportation next to the station while local transit is provided by the Grant Transit Authority.

== History ==
Passenger rail service to Ephrata began in 1893 with the arrival of the Great Northern Railway, particularly services like the Empire Builder and Western Star. Ephrata was the smallest town to be served by Great Northern's streamlined passenger trains through the mid-20th century. After Amtrak took over the national passenger rail network in 1971, the Western Star was eliminated and the Empire Builder stopped serving Ephrata. The loss of passenger rail service also affected postal deliveries to Ephrata, which were switched from trains to trucks. Amtrak service to Ephrata began on June 11, 1973, with a routing change for the North Coast Hiawatha. The trains stopped at an existing depot that served freight until December 1973.

The Ephrata stop served few passengers and was slated for closure as part of cuts in 1977, but was kept as an unstaffed station. The North Coast Hiawatha was discontinued in 1979, ending passenger service to Ephrata and Wenatchee. The Empire Builder returned to its original route in 1981, restoring passenger service to Ephrata. The existing Amtrak station was renovated and expanded to include a new multimodal transportation center and office space for the local chamber of commerce, re-opening on November 7, 1994.
