= Icicle Station =

Train station in Leavenworth, Washington, U.S.

Leavenworth, WA
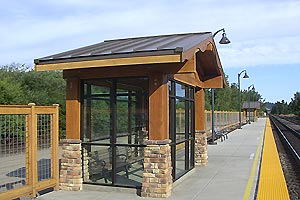
- Icicle Station platform

General information
- Other names: Icicle Station
- Location: 11645 North Road; Leavenworth, Washington; United States
- Coordinates: 47°36′23″N 120°38′38″W
- Owner: BNSF Railway
- Line: BNSF Scenic Subdivision
- Platforms: 1 side platform
- Tracks: 2

Construction
- Parking: 20 short-term spaces
- Cycle facilities: Rack
- Accessible: Yes

Other information
- Station code: Amtrak: LWA

History
- Opened: September 25, 2009

Passengers
- FY 2025: 12,460 (Amtrak)

Services
Preceding station	Amtrak	Following station
Everett toward Seattle	Empire Builder	Wenatchee toward Chicago
Former services
Preceding station	Great Northern Railway	Following station
Chumstick toward Seattle	Main Line	Peshastin toward St. Paul
Location

Icicle Station, also known as Leavenworth station, is a train station in Leavenworth, Washington, United States. It is served by two daily Amtrak trains on the Empire Builder, which travels west to Seattle and east to Chicago. The station has one platform and is located northeast of downtown Leavenworth, which is noted for its Bavarian village theme.

Leavenworth was served by the Great Northern Railway from 1893 until the cancellation of passenger service in the 1950s. The railroad and its successor, Amtrak, continued to run excursion trains and other special services until 1991. The local government began lobbying for a permanent train station in the early 2000s and earned funding from the federal government and private donations. The permanent station, named Icicle Station, opened in September 2009 after three months of construction.

== Description ==
Icicle Station is located one mile (1.6 km) northeast of downtown Leavenworth on North Road. It consists of a single platform on the north side of a double-tracked section of the Scenic Subdivision, owned and operated by BNSF Railway. The platform is 600 feet (180 m) long and has two small covered shelters, a bicycle rack, and a portable toilet. The station has 20 short-term parking spaces and a small cabin with a passenger waiting room.

== History ==
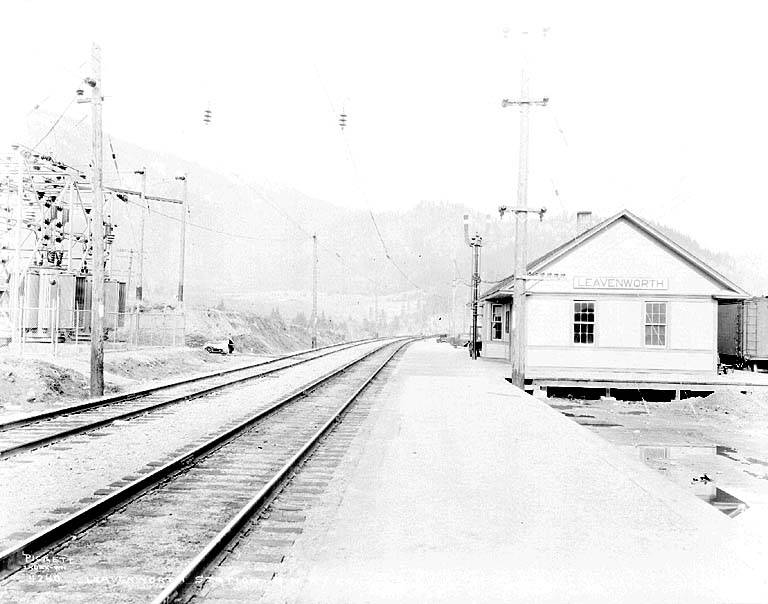
The Great Northern station around 1929

Leavenworth was founded in 1892, shortly after the Great Northern Railway arrived in the area to begin construction of its route across Stevens Pass towards Seattle, which was completed on January 6, 1893. The town grew around the railroad, as Great Northern operated mines and lumber mills in the area, until the railroad relocated its train operations in 1926. Great Northern ceased its regular passenger train service to Leavenworth in the mid-1950s, but continued to run special trains from Seattle to serve spectators for the city's annual ski jumping competition.

A city program in the 1960s promoted the renovation of buildings to fit a Bavarian Alpine theme that successfully began to draw tourists to Leavenworth. Annual excursion trains for the Autumn Leaf Festival and holiday festivals began in 1964, which were initially operated by Great Northern and funded by a nonprofit group until private travel agencies took over. The excursion trains continued for a year under Burlington Northern, the successor to Great Northern, and Amtrak after it took over national passenger rail operations in 1971. The excursion trains were canceled in 1991 because of inadequate facilities and partially replaced by a free shuttle bus from Wenatchee station.

The regional economic development council and the Port of Chelan County began studying the feasibility of year-round train service to Leavenworth in the early 1990s. The two agencies lured an undisclosed company from Utah to run an all-year weekend dinner train service after negotiations with Burlington Northern and Amtrak in 1993, including the construction of a 300-foot (91 m) platform in Leavenworth and a depot to fit the city's Bavarian theme. Negotiations with Burlington Northern were stalled over scheduling issues and existing freight congestion, but civic boosters in Leavenworth returned with alternate proposals the following year.

In April 1995, Amtrak announced its interest in adding a Leavenworth stop to the transcontinental Empire Builder if a platform were to be built with local funding. The port proposed joint funding of the platform with Leavenworth on the condition that Amtrak would commit to adding service once construction was completed. Amtrak and the port entered into further negotiations with an undisclosed tour operator who would organize potential excursion trains during the holiday season and other festival periods, rather than using the Empire Builder. The tour operator, Alki Tours, began running holiday excursion trains in December 1996. Amtrak, the port, and the local chamber of commerce contributed to funding a new temporary platform on North Road for the excursion train. Alki Tours also chartered a special round-trip train between Seattle and Spokane for the Lilac Festival in 1997, with a stop in Leavenworth.

Following a second market feasibility study in 2002, the Leavenworth city government began campaigning for a permanent all-year stop on the Empire Builder to be located on North Road. The proposal earned the support of U.S. Senator Patty Murray and state senator Linda Evans Parlette, and the city government entered into negotiations with Amtrak and BNSF Railway. The city was awarded a $75,000 grant from the federal government to initiate design work on the station project, which would be funded by a mix of government grants and private donations.

In February 2007, Amtrak and BNSF gave conditional approval for an Empire Builder stop in Leavenworth that would begin after completion of the permanent station, named "Icicle Station". In the agreement with BNSF, the city government was required to acknowledge that the Empire Builder could move to the Stampede Pass corridor and bypass Leavenworth entirely. The $750,000 project received $250,000 from the state government and $300,000 from the federal government's development funds, in addition to $200,000 raised by the city government.

The station was designed by HNTB and split into two project phases, to be built on a former BNSF staging area. The first phase would construct a platform, two shelters, and a parking lot. The second phase would include a larger, Bavarian-style shelter, additional parking stalls, and a longer platform. In May 2008, the first phase's estimated cost was revised to $850,000, with the shortfall planned to covered by private donations in a funding campaign launched by the city mayor. The planned opening date of November 2008 was also delayed to September 2009. By the end of the year, the city government had raised an additional $175,000 to cover the construction of the first phase.

Construction of Icicle Station began in late June 2009 shortly after the bid was awarded to a Wenatchee firm. The first half of the platform was completed in July and the second half was poured in early August. Icicle Station was opened on September 25, 2009, with a crowd of 200 people attending a dedication ceremony upon the arrival of the first eastbound train from Seattle. The new station served 4,461 passengers in its first four months of service, exceeding ridership estimates set by Amtrak. In January 2013, a small cabin was installed in the station's parking lot to act as a warming shelter for passengers. The second phase of the station project remains partially funded, with $900,000 allocated by the federal government in 2010.

== Services ==
Icicle Station is served by two daily Amtrak trains on the Empire Builder, a transcontinental route connecting to Seattle, Spokane, and Chicago. The next stops on the Empire Builder are Everett to the west and Wenatchee to the east. During Saturdays in December, Alki Tours has offered daytime excursion trains between Seattle and Leavenworth using chartered Amtrak trains.

The station has no direct bus service, with Northwestern Trailways and Amtrak Thruway using a separate facility in Leavenworth on U.S. Route 2. Link Transit, the local transit operator serving Leavenworth, does not operate buses that reach the station. A private company, Leavenworth Shuttle & Taxi, operates fixed-rate taxi service between Icicle Station and other areas of Leavenworth.
