= 1974 in rail transport =

This article lists events related to rail transport that occurred in 1974.

== Events ==
=== January ===
- January 2 – SEMTA begins subsidizing the Grand Trunk Western Railroad's commuter rail service between Detroit and Pontiac, Michigan.
- January 19–20 – New Zealand Railways K class (1877) steam locomotive K 88 Washington is recovered from the Branxholme locomotive dump in the Ōreti River.

=== March ===
- March 6 – Amtrak begins passenger service in the Central Valley of California with the first run of the San Joaquins between Oakland and Bakersfield.
- March 17 – A freight train on Canadian Pacific Railway is derailed when it hits a rock slide near Spences Bridge, British Columbia; the accident leads to the installation of ditch lights on all Canadian diesel locomotives, a practice later copied by American railroads.

=== May ===
- May 6 – Inauguration of full electric service on British Rail West Coast Main Line through to Glasgow.
- May 8–27 – Railway strike in India. The strike by 17 million workers of Indian Railways is the largest known.
- May 9 – A first section of Prague Metro Line C, from Florenc to Kacerov in Czechoslovakia, officially opens.
- May 17 – State-of-the-Art Car enters revenue service, on the New York City Subway.
- May 19
  - At the insistence of the Atchison, Topeka, and Santa Fe Railway Amtrak renames the Super Chief the Southwest Limited.
  - Amtrak renames the Texas Chief service it inherited from Santa Fe Railway to become the Lone Star due to objections from Santa Fe over Amtrak's quality of service.
  - Amtrak introduces the Expo '74 passenger train between Spokane and Seattle, Washington.

=== June ===
- June 16 – The Milwaukee Road ends operation of its electric locomotives in Montana and Idaho. Trains over the Rocky Mountains are now solely powered by diesels.

=== July ===
- July 23 – Shin-Koshigaya Station on what is now the Tobu Skytree Line in Koshigaya, Saitama, Japan, is opened.

=== August ===
- August 4 – Italicus Express bombing was a terrorist bombing in Italy which killed 12 people.
- August 5 – Amtrak introduces the Adirondack passenger train between New York City and Montreal, Quebec.
- August 10 – A Philippine National Railways express train from San Fernando, La Union to Manila collided with a Baliwag Transit bus at a railroad crossing in Calumpit, Bulacan, killing 18 people and injuring another 53.
- August 15 – Line 1 of the Seoul Metro opens a 7.1 km (4.4 mi) section between Seoul and Cheongnwangnyi.
- August 30 – In the Zagreb train disaster an express traveling from Belgrade to Dortmund derailed before entering Zagreb Main Station, killing 153 people.

=== September ===
- September 14
  - Commercial operation begins on São Paulo Metro, Brazil.
  - Amtrak discontinues its Expo '74 service.
- September 15 – Amtrak introduces the Blue Water Limited passenger train between Chicago and Port Huron, Michigan.
- September 16 – Passenger traffic begins through the Bay Area Rapid Transit (BART) 3.6 mi (5.8 km) Transbay Tube between Oakland and San Francisco beneath San Francisco Bay, the world's longest and deepest immersed tube tunnel.

=== October ===
- October 14 – The Tono Railway Dachi Line, connecting Tokishi and Higashi-dachi in Gifu Prefecture, Japan, is permanently closed.
- October 30 – In Tokyo, Japan, the Yurakucho Line is opened between Ikebukuro and Ginza-itchome.

=== Unknown date ===
- The original Norfolk Southern Railway is merged into the Southern Railway (US).
- John W. Barriger III steps down from the presidency of the Boston and Maine Railroad.
- The Atchison, Topeka and Santa Fe Railway operates the last train ever on its subsidiary Grand Canyon Railway; it is a maintenance of way train.
