= Spokane Intermodal Center =

Train station in Spokane, Washington, United States

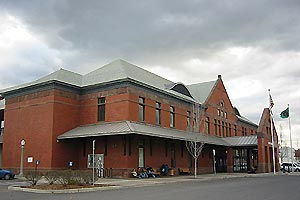

General information
- Location: 221 West 1st Avenue; Spokane, Washington; United States
- Coordinates: 47.6563°N 117.4153°W
- Owner: City of Spokane
- Line: BNSF Spokane Subdivision
- Platforms: 1 island platform
- Tracks: 5
- Connections: Amtrak Thruway; FlixBus; Greyhound Lines; Northwestern Trailways; Jefferson Lines; Travel Washington; Spokane Transit Authority

Construction
- Structure type: At-grade
- Parking: Yes
- Accessible: Yes

Other information
- Station code: Amtrak: SPK

History
- Opened: March 5, 1891
- Rebuilt: 1994

Passengers
- FY 2025: 37,480 (Amtrak)

Services
Preceding station	Amtrak	Following station
Ephrata toward Seattle	Empire Builder	Sandpoint toward Chicago
Pasco toward Portland	Empire Builder	Sandpoint toward Chicago
Former services
Preceding station	Amtrak	Following station
Yakima Closed 1981 toward Seattle	Empire Builder	Sandpoint toward Chicago
Ephrata toward Seattle	North Coast Hiawatha	Sandpoint toward Chicago
Ephrata toward Seattle	Expo '74	Terminus
Preceding station	Northern Pacific Railway	Following station
Marshall toward Seattle or Tacoma	Main Line	Hauser toward St. Paul
Marshall toward Coulee City	Washington Central Branch	Terminus
Terminus	Spokane – Lewiston	Marshall toward Lewiston
Preceding station	Spokane, Portland and Seattle Railway	Following station
Marshall toward Portland	Main Line	Terminus
Preceding station	Milwaukee Road	Following station
Cheney toward Seattle or Tacoma	Main Line	Dishman toward Chicago
Location

The Spokane Intermodal Center is an intermodal transport facility located in Spokane, Washington, United States. It serves as a service stop for the Amtrak Empire Builder, as well as the FlixBus, Greyhound, Trailways, and Jefferson Lines station for Spokane. The Empire Builder provides service daily between Chicago, Illinois and Spokane before continuing on to Seattle, Washington or Portland, Oregon. (Note: As of October 6, 2013, the westbound trains (Routes 7 & 27) are scheduled to arrive together at 1:40 am and depart to Seattle (Route 7) at 2:15 am and to Portland (Route 27) at 2:45 am. The eastbound train from Portland (Route 28) is scheduled to arrive at 12:13 and the train from Seattle (Route 8) at 12:45 am. Both trains are scheduled to depart together at 1:30 am.)

The station was built in 1891 for the Northern Pacific Railway. It was remodeled in 1994 to allow buses to share the station, creating an intermodal facility.

Since 1981, when the westbound Empire Builder arrives in the middle of the night, the first six Superliner cars (five passenger cars, a diner and a baggage car) go to King Street Station in Seattle, while a single locomotive from Spokane takes the last four cars (the Sightseer Lounge, two coaches and a sleeper) to Portland Union Station. The eastbound trains join in Spokane in the middle of the night and run combined to Chicago Union Station. (The next eastbound stop is in Sandpoint, Idaho and the next westbound stops are in Ephrata, Washington for the Seattle section and Pasco, Washington for the Portland section.) In pre-Amtrak days, the Empire Builder split into Seattle and Portland sections at Spokane for most of the 1940s and 1950s.

The station is located just north of Interstate 90 and is about 0.5 miles (0.80 km) southwest of the Spokane Center of the University of Washington and 1 mile (1.6 km) southwest of the campus of Gonzaga University.

The station, parking lot, and passenger platform are owned by the City of Spokane. The tracks are owned by BNSF Railway.
