= Link Transit =

Bus operator in Chelan and Douglas counties, Washington, U.S.

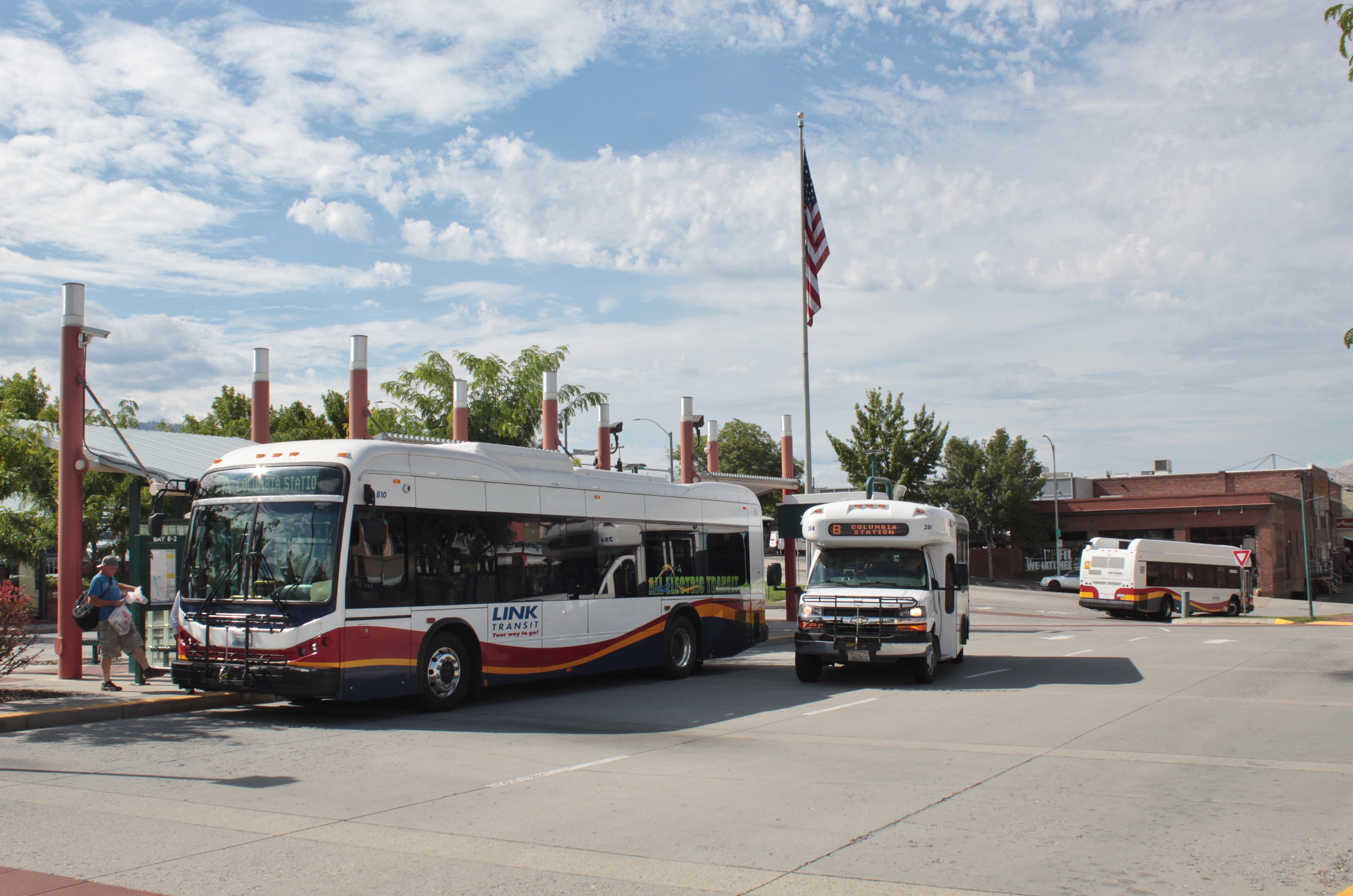
- Link Transit buses at Columbia Station
- Founded: November 21, 1989
- Commenced operation: December 16, 1991
- Headquarters: 2700 Euclid Avenue; Wenatchee, WA 98801
- Locale: Wenatchee–East Wenatchee metropolitan area
- Service type: Bus service, paratransit
- Routes: 18
- Stops: 573
- Fleet: 65 buses and paratransit vehicles
- Daily ridership: 3,610 (2014)
- Annual ridership: 987,376 (2014)
- Fuel type: Diesel
- General Manager: Nick Covey
- Website: www.linktransit.com

Link Transit is the public transit authority of Chelan and Douglas counties in the U.S. state of Washington. It operates fixed bus and paratransit services between 17 communities in the Wenatchee–East Wenatchee metropolitan area, including the cities of Chelan, Leavenworth, Waterville and Wenatchee. In 2014, Link Transit carried 987,376 passengers on its 18 bus routes.

It is one of only two public transportation benefit areas, along with Ben Franklin Transit in the Tri-Cities, to cover more than one county. The Chelan-Douglas Public Transportation Benefit Area was founded in November 1989 and a 0.4% sales tax was approved by voters in September 1990 to fund a bus system. The Link Transit moniker was adopted shortly before bus service began on December 16, 1991. Link Transit was initially a fare-free system until February 2000.

== Routes ==
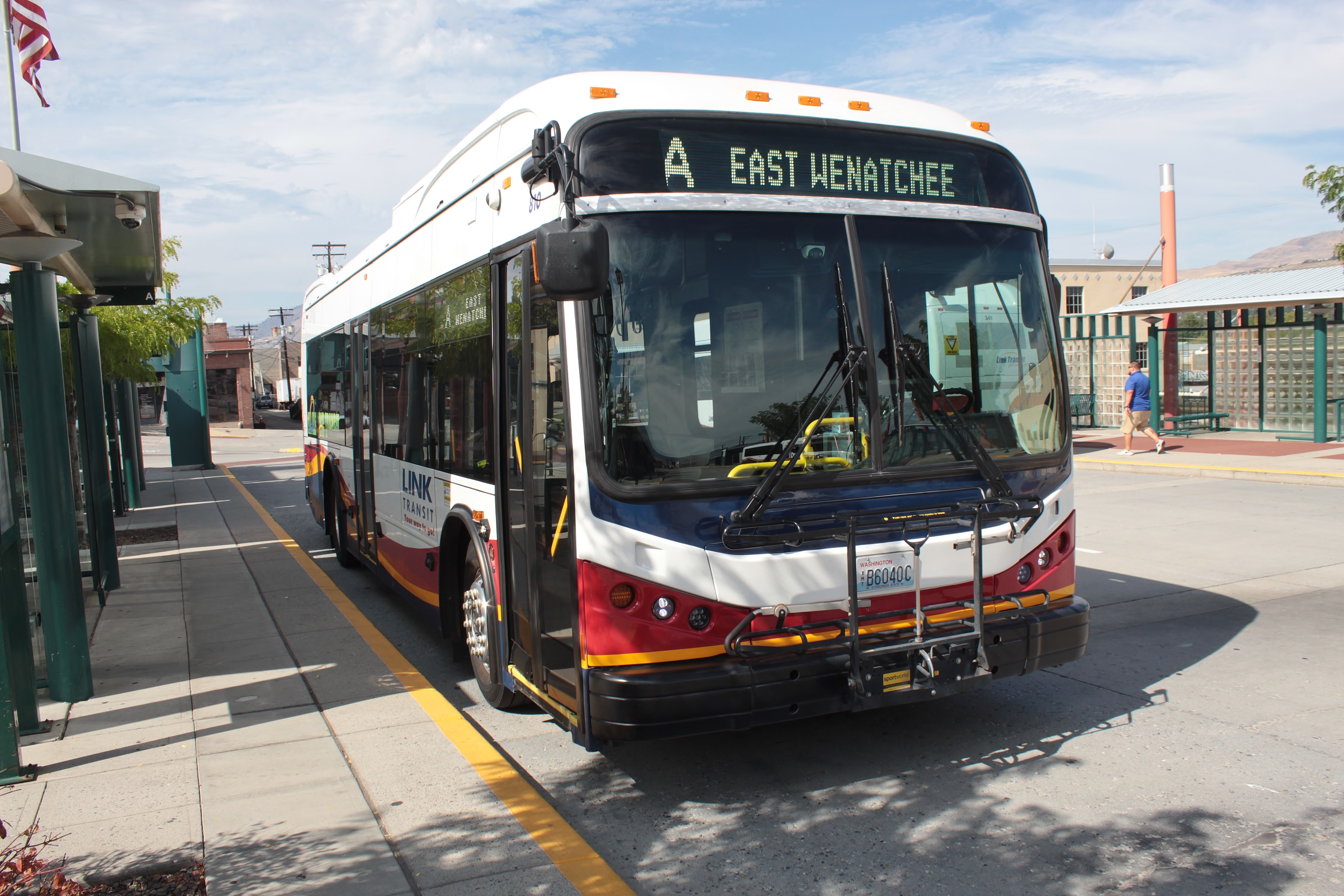
An electric bus operated by Link Transit on Route A

Link Transit operates 18 bus routes, with service operating from Monday through Sunday. Three of these routes are "trolley" routes using trolley-replica buses branded as "The Current", running electric battery buses and not charging fares; six are intercity routes connecting Wenatchee to outlying communities via major highways; and one is a season route to the Mission Ridge Ski Area, branded as "SkiLink", which is free for pass holders to the resort. Link Transit also operates one dial-a-ride service in Leavenworth.

Most of these bus routes connect to the three main transit centers in Wenatchee and its suburbs: Columbia Station, Wenatchee Valley Mall in East Wenatchee, and Olds Station Park & Ride. Most routes also operate in loops with one-way segments.

=== Bus routes ===
Route	Inbound terminus	Outbound terminus	Via	Bi-directional	Saturday service	Notes
1	Columbia Station		Methow Street, Crawford Avenue, Miller Street, Russell Street, Ferry Street	No	Yes	
5	Columbia Station	Walmart	Cherry Street, Western Avenue, Fifth Street, Wenatchee Valley College, Maple Street	No	Yes	
7	Columbia Station		Ninth Street, Wenatchee Valley College, Western Avenue, Washington Street	No	Yes	
8W/8E	Columbia Station		Wenatchee Valley Mall, Olds Station Park and Ride, Central Washington Hospital	Yes	Yes	Routes split by direction
11	Wenatchee Valley Mall		Eastmont Avenue, 4th Street, Kentucky Avenue, 3rd Street, 5th Street, 8th Street	Yes (route 12)	No	Running in opposite direction as route 12
12	Wenatchee Valley Mall		8th Street, 5th Street, 3rd Street, Kentucky Avenue, 4th Street, Eastmont Avenue	Yes (route 11)	No	Running in opposite direction as route 11

=== Intercity routes ===
Route	Inbound terminus	Outbound terminus	Via	Off-peak service	Saturday service	Notes
20	Columbia Station	Manson	Orondo, Chelan	No	No	
21	Columbia Station	Manson	Entiat, Chelan	Yes	Yes	
22	Columbia Station	Leavenworth	Olds Station, Cashmere, Peshastin	Yes	Yes	
23	Columbia Station	Rock Island	East Wenatchee	Yes	Yes	
24	Columbia Station	Malaga		Yes	Yes	
25	Columbia Station	Waterville	East Wenatchee, Orondo	No	No	
26	Columbia Station	Ardenvoir	Olds Station, Entiat	No	No	
28	Columbia Station	Cashmere	Olds Station	Yes	Yes	
40 (SkiLink)	Olds Station	Columbia Station, East Wenatchee	Mission Ridge Ski Area	No	Yes	Seasonal route, only operates from November to April primarily on weekends

=== Shuttle and urban routes ===
Shuttle routes are fare-free and run at higher frequencies.

Route	Inbound terminus	Outbound terminus	Via	Saturday service	Notes
A	Columbia Station	Wenatchee Valley Mall	Mission Street	Yes	Replaced route 19
B	Columbia Station	Wenatchee Valley College	Worthen Street, Riverside Drive, Fifth Street	Yes	
C	Columbia Station	Wenatchee Valley Medical Center	Wenatchee Avenue	Yes	Replaced route 9
D	Wilkommen Park and Ride	Icicle River Road	Highway 2	Yes	
E	Johnson and Columbia (Chelan)		Lakeside Park, Don Morse Park	Yes	Seasonal service during summer

== Fleet ==
Link Transit operates electric buses, powered by batteries, on its "Current" frequent routes in Wenatchee and East Wenatchee. The first batch of five buses manufactured by EBus was delivered in 2014 and funded by a $2.9 million grant from the Federal Transit Administration (FTA). In 2016, the FTA awarded a $3.8 million grant to Link Transit to purchase additional electric buses to replace older diesel vehicles; Link Transit awarded a four-bus order to BYD Auto for their K9 electric buses.

Link Transit received its BYD electric buses in 2017 and outfitted one with an experimental wireless 200 kW charger, the first of its kind in the United States.

=== Current Bus Fleet ===
As of December 31, 2014

Year	Manufacturer	Model	Fleet numbers	Fuel type	Notes
1999	Gillig	Phantom	327–332	Diesel	329 is retired.
2000	Chance	AH-28	504, 507	Diesel	Formerly used on trolley routes
2003	Gillig	Low Floor	333–337	Diesel	
2004	Gillig	Low Floor	305–308	Diesel	
2005	Gillig	Low Floor	309–312	Diesel	
2007	Gillig	Low Floor	313–315	Diesel	
2008	Gillig	Low Floor	316–326	Diesel	
2010	EBus	22T	803–806	Electric battery	Branded for "The Current" trolley routes
