= Travel Washington =

Intercity bus service in U.S. state of Washington

- Parent: Washington State Department of Transportation
- Commenced operation: December 2007
- Headquarters: 310 Maple Park Avenue SE; Olympia, Washington
- Service area: Washington state
- Service type: Intercity bus
- Alliance: Greyhound Lines
- Routes: 5
- Operator: Northwestern Stage Lines, Greyhound Lines, Bellair Charters and Airporter
- Website: wsdot.wa.gov/business-wsdot/grants/public-transportation-grants/grant-programs-and-awards/travel-washington-intercity-bus

Travel Washington is an intercity bus service in the U.S. state of Washington funded by the Washington State Department of Transportation (WSDOT). It has five routes that connect major cities to other modes, including Amtrak and Greyhound Lines.

== History ==
Greyhound Lines formerly ran extensive intercity service in Washington state that was cut in 2004 as part of a regional restructure to focus on profitable routes. In 2007, the Washington State Department of Transportation began planning for an intercity bus network pilot project.

The first Travel Washington bus route to open was the Grape Line, which began service in December 2007. It was also the first bus service to be funded through a private-public partnership between the Federal Transit Administration and private operators, with the former matching the latter's investments with grant money.

The Dungeness Line's contract was transferred to Greyhound in 2018 and came with the addition of a new stop in Port Townsend. A 2019 plan proposed several extensions and new corridors for the system, including U.S. Route 12 between Aberdeen and Yakima; service to Republic from Tonasket and Colville; and service on several Palouse routes. A fifth route, the Wheat Line, launched in May 2026 with twice-daily service between Pasco and Spokane. The route was funded by a federal grant with the goal of connecting two 2026 FIFA World Cup fan zones in Pasco and Spokane.

== Routes ==
Travel Washington consists of five routes connecting major cities in Washington to other intercity transit services offered by Amtrak, Greyhound and Northwestern Stage Lines, as well as regional airports in Seattle and Pasco. Most stops are sited at major transfer points with local bus systems.

Routes are named after Washingtonian products and resources, such as Dungeness crab and apples.

Route	Termini		Other stops	Length		Daily roundtrips	Began service	Operator	Website
Route	Southern/western	Northern/eastern	Other stops	mi	km	Daily roundtrips	Began service	Operator	Website
Apple Line	Ellensburg	Omak	George, Quincy, Wenatchee (Columbia Station), Orondo, Chelan Falls, Pateros, Brewster, Malott, Okanogan	49	79	1	October 28, 2008	Northwestern Trailways	appleline.us
Dungeness Line	Port Angeles	Seattle–Tacoma International Airport	Sequim, Port Townsend, Discovery Bay, Downtown Seattle (King Street Station)	98	158	2	September 17, 2008	MTR Western	dungeness-line.com
Gold Line	Spokane International Airport	Kettle Falls	Downtown Spokane (Spokane Intermodal Center & STA Plaza), Deer Park, Loon Lake, Chewelah, Addy, Arden, Colville	80	130	2	September 8, 2010	Belair Charters	gold-line.us
Grape Line	Tri-Cities Airport	Walla Walla Regional Airport	Pasco (Pasco Intermodal Train Station), Burbank, Wallula, Touchet	160	260	3	December 10, 2007	Belair Charters	grapeline.us
Wheat Line	Pasco (Pasco Intermodal Train Station)	Spokane (Spokane Intermodal Center)	Tri-Cities Airport, Moses Lake, Cheney (Eastern Washington University), Spokane International Airport			2	May 1, 2026	Belair Charters	wheatline.us

== See also ==
- Intercity buses in the United States
- Oregon POINT
