= Leavenworth, Washington =

City in Washington, United States

- City
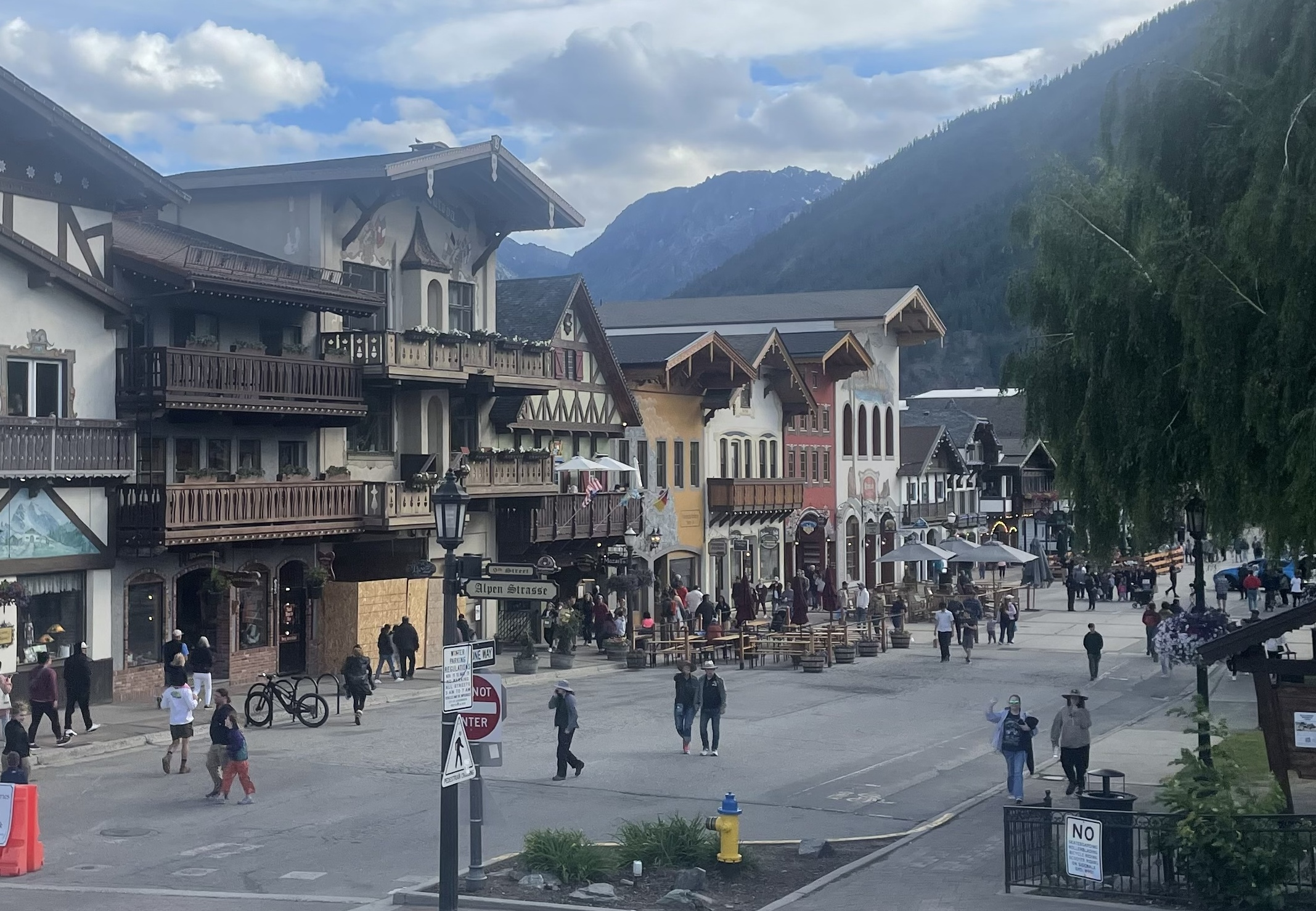
- Leavenworth's main street was modeled on a Bavarian village.

- Location of Leavenworth in Chelan County, Washington

- Location within Washington (state) Location within the United States
- Coordinates: 47°35′42″N 120°39′46″W
- Country: United States
- State: Washington
- County: Chelan
- Established: 1885
- Incorporated: September 5, 1906

Government
  - Mayor: Carl Florea

Area
  - Total: 1.47 sq mi (3.81 km^{2})
  - Land: 1.45 sq mi (3.76 km^{2})
  - Water: 0.019 sq mi (0.05 km^{2})
- Elevation: 1,168 ft (356 m)

Population (2020)
  - Total: 2,263
  - Density: 1,397/sq mi (539.2/km^{2})
- Time zone: UTC-8 (PST)
  - Summer (DST): UTC-7 (PDT)
- ZIP code: 98826
- Area code: 509
- FIPS code: 53-38845
- GNIS feature ID: 2410814
- Website: cityofleavenworth.com

Leavenworth is a city in Chelan County, Washington, United States. The population was 2,263 at the 2020 census. The entire town center is modeled on a Bavarian village as part of a civic initiative that began in the 1960s. Leavenworth is part of the Wenatchee–East Wenatchee metropolitan area.

The city is connected to the Seattle metropolitan area by U.S. Route 2, which also provides access to the Stevens Pass Ski Area.

== History ==
The area near the confluence of Icicle Creek and the Wenatchee River in modern-day Leavenworth is within the traditional territories of the indigenous Wenatchi and Yakama peoples. The tribes had settlements on both waterways, including the villages of scəm̓ ̓áw̓s and sĭnpŭsqốĭsoḣ near modern-day Leavenworth, which was also a camas and root-gathering area. The Wenatchi and Yakama were signatories to the 1855 Treaty of Walla Walla; an Indian reservation for the Wenatchi covering 36 square miles (93 km^{2}) around a fishery at the confluence was promised in the treaty but never surveyed by the federal government. Most members of the Wenatchi relocated to the Colville Indian Reservation and Yakama Indian Reservation in the early 20th century, while few remained in the Leavenworth and Cashmere area.

The first non-native settlers in the area were John Emig and Nicholas Kinscherf, who staked their homestead claims near Icicle Creek in 1885. A community named "Icicle Flats" was established by other settlers on the south side of the Wenatchee River in 1891. According to surveyor Albert Hale Sylvester, the "Icicle" name was derived from the indigenous name "Nasikelt", which translates to a narrow canyon or gorge. The Great Northern Railway purchased land on the north side of the river for a division point and railyard for its route across Stevens Pass in October 1892, which prompted residents to move across the river. A new town was established there in 1893 and named Leavenworth for Charles Leavenworth, a Portland-based land investor with the Okanogan Investment Company who surveyed the site and laid its streets. Leavenworth was a relative of U.S. Army colonel Henry Leavenworth, the founder of Fort Leavenworth and namesake of Leavenworth, Kansas. The Stevens Pass route, which connected Seattle to Wenatchee, was completed in January 1893 and was the final section of the transcontinental Great Northern Railway.

By February 1893, the new town of Leavenworth had grown to approximately 700 people and over 40 businesses, including hotels, general stores, and saloons. Lafayette Lamb arrived in 1903 from Clinton, Iowa, to build the second largest sawmill in Washington. The settlement had three major fires at the turn of the 20th century that destroyed several buildings. Leavenworth was officially incorporated as a city on September 5, 1906. A small timber community, it became a regional office of the Great Northern Railway in the early 1900s. The railroad relocated to Wenatchee in 1925, greatly affecting Leavenworth's economy. The city's population declined well into the 1950s as the lumber mills closed and stores relocated.

The city looked to tourism and recreation as a major economy as early as 1929, when they opened a ski jump. In 1962, the Project LIFE (Leavenworth Improvement For Everyone) Committee was formed in partnership with the University of Washington to investigate strategies to revitalize the struggling logging town. The idea to create a "Bavarian-Swiss" alpine theme town came from two Seattle businessmen, Ted Price and Bob Rodgers, who had bought a failing cafe at Coles Corner in 1960. Price and Rodgers had chosen the theme based on the latter's experience in Bavaria while deployed by the U.S. Army during World War II; the cafe was renamed The Squirrel Tree and expanded with a motel and gift shop. Price was chair of the Project LIFE tourism subcommittee, and in 1965 the pair led a trip to a Danish-themed town, Solvang, California, to build support for the idea. Before the Bavarian village concept was adopted, community leaders had initially favored a Gay Nineties theme. The partners had also considered a Native American theme for The Squirrel Tree.

The Project LIFE members acquired properties in Leavenworth and were joined by architects Earl Petersen, who designed Solvang's Danish buildings, and Germany-born designer Heinz Ulbricht. The first building to be rebuilt in the Bavarian style was the Chikamin Hotel, which had been damaged in a fire and reopened as the Edelweiss Hotel (named for the state flower of Bavaria) on July 1, 1965. Several buildings were renovated later that year after business loans were secured to prepare the city for the 1966 Washington Autumn Leaf Festival. By 1970, Leavenworth was hosting several annual festivals and had formed a design review board to enforce and maintain the standards set by Project LIFE.

On July 28, 1994, the Rat Creek Fire was ignited in the Icicle Creek basin and grew to 24,371 acres (9,863 ha) over the next three weeks as it moved towards northeast Leavenworth. It was one of 34 fires in the Hatchery Complex Fire that were ignited in late July by thunderstorms and other causes. The city was placed under an evacuation alert for several days as the fire surrounded parts of the valley and shut down U.S. Route 2. The evacuation alert in Leavenworth was lifted by August 10, coinciding with the reopening of U.S. Route 2. Later fires in 2001, 2004, and 2012 burned areas around Leavenworth. The Wenatchee River underwent a major flood in December 2025 and crested at a maximum of 17 feet (5.2 m); a widespread power outage in Leavenworth, caused in part by high winds, resulted in the initial cancellation of holiday events. The city's holiday lights and Christmastown festival were both rescheduled after power was restored.

== Geography ==
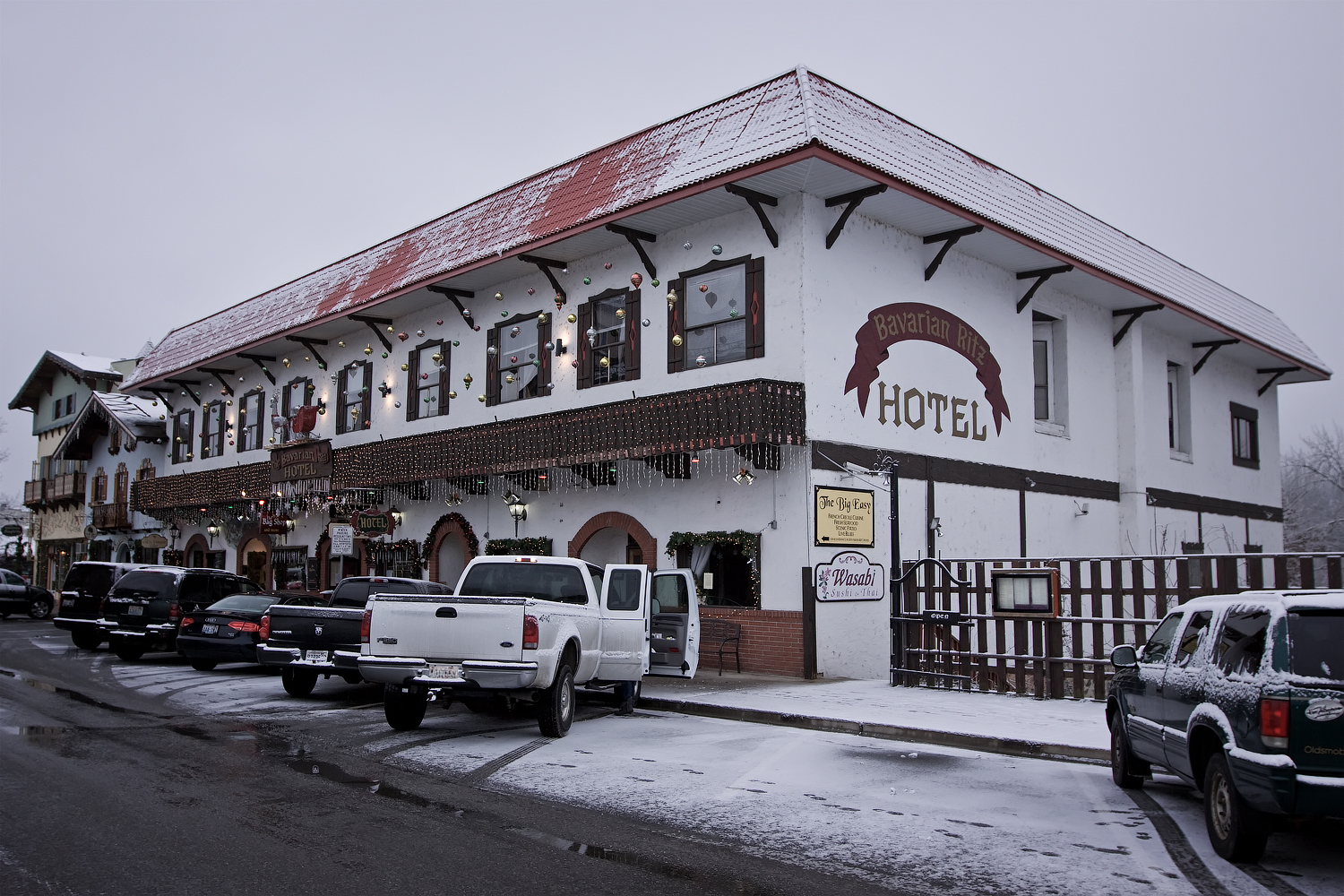
Bavarian Ritz Hotel

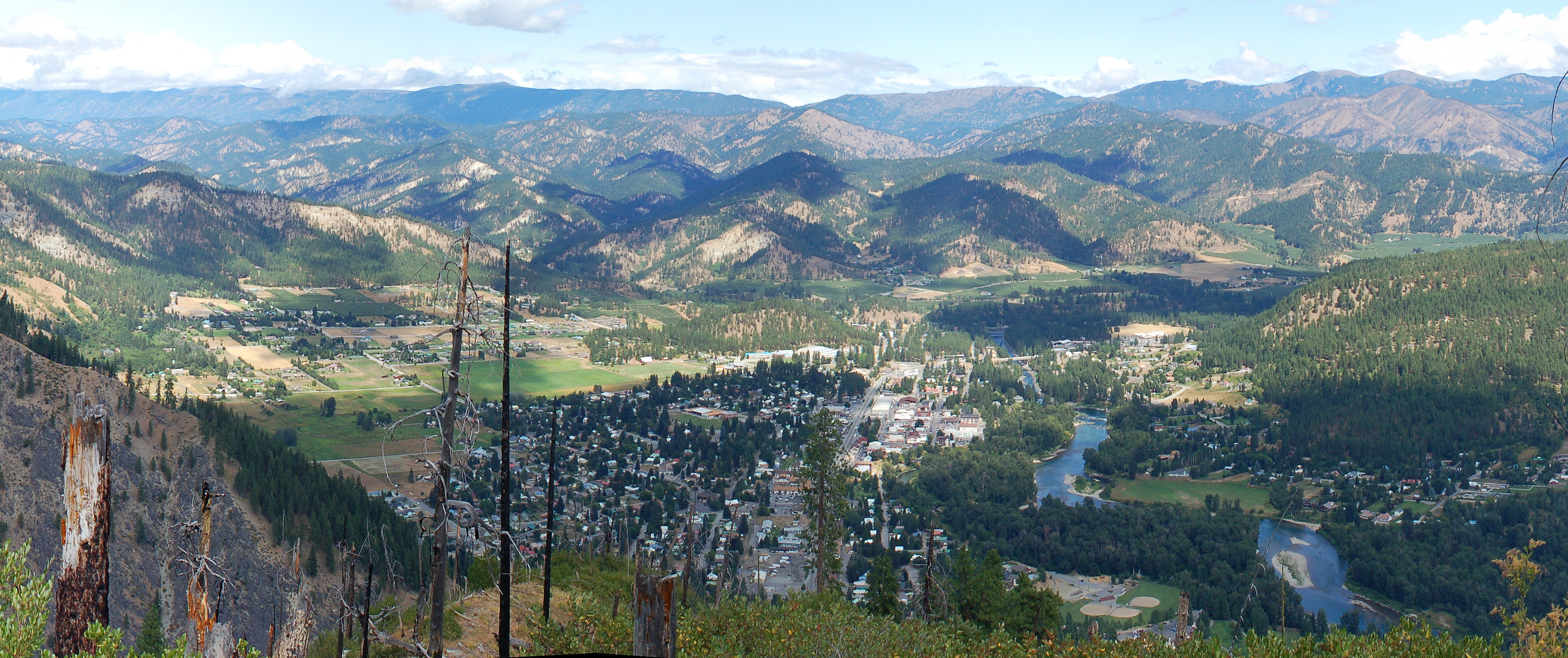
Downtown Leavenworth, 1,500 feet (460 m) below, as viewed from the adjacent Icicle Ridge on an August afternoon

Leavenworth is situated in the Cascade Mountains at an elevation of 1,168 feet (356 m) above sea level and is surrounded by mountains that range from 5,000 to 8,000 feet (1,500 to 2,400 m) in height. The city lies along the Wenatchee River near its confluence with Icicle Creek. According to the United States Census Bureau, the city has a total area of 1.25 square miles (3.24 km^{2}), of which 1.23 square miles (3.19 km^{2}) is land and 0.02 square miles (0.05 km^{2}) is water.

=== Geology ===
Leavenworth sits on the southeast side of the North Cascades collage, a group of terranes that accreted to North America approximately 90 million years before present during the Cretaceous period. The presence of marine fossils in the terranes indicates that they may have been a group of islands originating in the South Pacific. They originally were oriented into north–south slices until further accretion cut the terranes into horizontal, east–west slices.

During the Eocene epoch about 50 million years before present, the area was once again cut into north–south slices that created several local fault lines, including the Leavenworth fault and the Entiat fault. The Chiwaukum graben was created between these faults; it is about 12 miles (19 km) wide and trends northwest from Wenatchee for about 50 miles (80 km). As the graben dropped, it began to fill with clastic sediment from the surrounding hills, creating the Chumstick formation. About 30 million years before present in the Oligocene epoch, the Chiwaukum graben underwent compressional deformation creating several folds in the region that are visible today. Leavenworth is on the western edge of the graben; the Leavenworth fault runs through the western edge of town. The area to the west and southwest of Leavenworth was created in the middle Cretaceous period with the uplift of the Mount Stuart batholith, forming the granite rock seen today in Icicle Ridge and Tumwater Mountain.

During the Pleistocene and into the Holocene epochs, an alpine glacier originating from the southwest in the Stuart Range made its way to where the town is today. Leavenworth sits on the terminal moraine of that glacier and has many glacial erratics that originated 20 miles up the Icicle Valley near Mount Stuart. Approximately 19,000 years before present, a large rock slide dammed the Columbia River near Rock Island, just south of Wenatchee. The temporary dam, in conjunction with one of the Lake Missoula floods, caused the water to flow back up the Wenatchee Valley, where it was stopped by the glacier at Leavenworth. As the leading edge of the glacier interacted with the flood, ice rafts formed carrying granite erratics from the Stuart batholith, which ended up in the town of Dryden about 15 miles down the valley from Leavenworth. As the glacier retreated, the south side of Leavenworth was a lake dammed up by the moraine.

=== Climate ===
Leavenworth has a continental Mediterranean climate (Köppen Dsb) with summers characterized by hot, sunny days and chilly nights, and cold, snowy winters.

During the summer, the weather is typically anticyclonic due to the presence of the North Pacific anticyclone, with resultant clear skies and large diurnal temperature ranges. Rainfall is limited by the Cascade rain shadow as well as by the anticyclone, and all months from May to October have recorded zero precipitation on occasions, including 114 consecutive days without precipitation from June to October 2003. When a continental flow enters the Columbia Basin, the temperature can be very hot during the day, with the hottest temperature being 110 °F or 43.3 °C during the heatwave of July 1941. However, on cooler, stiller days, summer nights can still be cold and frosts have been recorded as early as August 29 in 1980.

The fall months have steady cooling and a gradual increase in the frequency of frontal storms producing rainfall, while winter weather is typically cold and snowy, with an annual mean snowfall of 90.1 inches or 2.29 metres and a maximum monthly total of 92.3 inches (2.34 m) recorded in December 1996. The snowiest season has been from July 1968 to June 1969 with 217.2 inches (5.52 m) and the least snowy from July 1962 to June 1963 when just 19.4 inches (0.49 m) of snow fell. The lowest temperature recorded in Leavenworth was −36 °F (−37.8 °C) on December 30, 1968, but typically five mornings per year will fall at or below 0 °F or −17.8 °C. Approximately 4 feet (1.2 m) of snow fell in a 48-hour period in January 2022, causing widespread disruption and a shortage of space to store plowed and collected snow.

The wettest "rain year" was recorded from July 1955 to June 1956 with a total of 41.13 inches (1,044.7 mm) and the driest was from July 1929 to June 1930 with 11.77 inches (299.0 mm). The spring months see gradual warming and drying, though frosts remain frequent well into the start of April. During an average year, over 168 mornings see temperatures fall to freezing or below. May 16 is the average date of last freeze; 2016 was the first year to record a last frost in March.

Climate data for Leavenworth, Washington (1991–2020 normals, extremes 1914-present)
| Month | Jan | Feb | Mar | Apr | May | Jun | Jul | Aug | Sep | Oct | Nov | Dec | Year |
|---|---|---|---|---|---|---|---|---|---|---|---|---|---|
| Record high °F (°C) | 64 (18) | 66 (19) | 79 (26) | 92 (33) | 101 (38) | 109 (43) | 110 (43) | 108 (42) | 104 (40) | 91 (33) | 74 (23) | 66 (19) | 110 (43) |
| Mean maximum °F (°C) | 48.5 (9.2) | 56.2 (13.4) | 67.2 (19.6) | 77.6 (25.3) | 89.4 (31.9) | 93.6 (34.2) | 100.9 (38.3) | 100.9 (38.3) | 93.7 (34.3) | 80.4 (26.9) | 59.1 (15.1) | 46.9 (8.3) | 102.5 (39.2) |
| Mean daily maximum °F (°C) | 33.5 (0.8) | 42.4 (5.8) | 52.0 (11.1) | 61.3 (16.3) | 71.0 (21.7) | 77.2 (25.1) | 87.0 (30.6) | 86.9 (30.5) | 77.9 (25.5) | 62.1 (16.7) | 43.9 (6.6) | 33.6 (0.9) | 60.7 (16.0) |
| Daily mean °F (°C) | 26.4 (−3.1) | 31.7 (−0.2) | 39.2 (4.0) | 46.7 (8.2) | 55.4 (13.0) | 61.5 (16.4) | 69.0 (20.6) | 68.6 (20.3) | 59.8 (15.4) | 47.6 (8.7) | 35.0 (1.7) | 26.8 (−2.9) | 47.3 (8.5) |
| Mean daily minimum °F (°C) | 19.4 (−7.0) | 21.1 (−6.1) | 26.3 (−3.2) | 32.0 (0.0) | 39.7 (4.3) | 45.8 (7.7) | 51.0 (10.6) | 50.3 (10.2) | 41.7 (5.4) | 33.1 (0.6) | 26.2 (−3.2) | 20.0 (−6.7) | 33.9 (1.1) |
| Mean minimum °F (°C) | 4.0 (−15.6) | 10.0 (−12.2) | 18.5 (−7.5) | 26.6 (−3.0) | 31.4 (−0.3) | 38.2 (3.4) | 44.0 (6.7) | 43.5 (6.4) | 34.5 (1.4) | 24.7 (−4.1) | 15.6 (−9.1) | 8.6 (−13.0) | −0.8 (−18.2) |
| Record low °F (°C) | −27 (−33) | −25 (−32) | −6 (−21) | 19 (−7) | 24 (−4) | 24 (−4) | 34 (1) | 30 (−1) | 19 (−7) | 11 (−12) | −7 (−22) | −36 (−38) | −36 (−38) |
| Average precipitation inches (mm) | 4.12 (105) | 2.90 (74) | 2.46 (62) | 1.22 (31) | 1.40 (36) | 1.04 (26) | 0.45 (11) | 0.37 (9.4) | 0.76 (19) | 2.37 (60) | 4.08 (104) | 4.52 (115) | 25.69 (652.4) |
| Average snowfall inches (cm) | 22.1 (56) | 12.6 (32) | 4.7 (12) | 0.0 (0.0) | 0.0 (0.0) | 0.0 (0.0) | 0.0 (0.0) | 0.0 (0.0) | 0.0 (0.0) | 0.3 (0.76) | 8.1 (21) | 32.4 (82) | 80.2 (203.76) |
| Average extreme snow depth inches (cm) | 25.0 (64) | 20.0 (51) | 10.8 (27) | 0.1 (0.25) | 0.0 (0.0) | 0.0 (0.0) | 0.0 (0.0) | 0.0 (0.0) | 0.0 (0.0) | 0.2 (0.51) | 4.5 (11) | 18.5 (47) | 30.1 (76) |
| Average precipitation days (≥ 0.01 in) | 14.0 | 10.6 | 9.3 | 7.0 | 6.7 | 5.6 | 2.8 | 2.4 | 4.0 | 8.9 | 13.7 | 14.0 | 99.0 |
| Average snowy days (≥ 0.1 in) | 8.7 | 5.1 | 2.7 | 0.0 | 0.0 | 0.0 | 0.0 | 0.0 | 0.0 | 0.2 | 3.3 | 8.9 | 28.9 |
Source: NOAA

== Economy and tourism ==
The city's largest industry is tourism, primarily in the hospitality and service sectors. Leavenworth and its Bavarian-style village drew 3.4 million visitors in 2024, of which 59 percent were from the Seattle metropolitan area. At its peak in December, the city's daytime population increases to 33,000 due to a large number of visitors during winter events organized by local businesses and the chamber of commerce. Within the city limits, there are 869 hotel and motel rooms as well as 369 other short-term rental rooms; Leavenworth has a lodging tax that funds programs and projects that attract visitors or generate economic development.

== Demographics ==
Leavenworth, Washington – Racial and ethnic composition Note: the US Census treats Hispanic/Latino as an ethnic category. This table excludes Latinos from the racial categories and assigns them to a separate category. Hispanics/Latinos may be of any race.
| Race / Ethnicity (NH = Non-Hispanic) | Pop 2000 | Pop 2010 | Pop 2020 | % 2000 | % 2010 | % 2020 |
|---|---|---|---|---|---|---|
| White alone (NH) | 1,877 | 1,692 | 1,813 | 90.50% | 86.11% | 80.11% |
| Black or African American alone (NH) | 2 | 7 | 11 | 0.10% | 0.36% | 0.49% |
| Native American or Alaska Native alone (NH) | 28 | 10 | 2 | 1.35% | 0.51% | 0.09% |
| Asian alone (NH) | 7 | 11 | 19 | 0.34% | 0.56% | 0.84% |
| Native Hawaiian or Pacific Islander alone (NH) | 2 | 4 | 0 | 0.10% | 0.20% | 0.00% |
| Other race alone (NH) | 3 | 1 | 17 | 0.14% | 0.05% | 0.75% |
| Mixed race or Multiracial (NH) | 27 | 27 | 113 | 1.30% | 1.37% | 4.99% |
| Hispanic or Latino (any race) | 128 | 213 | 288 | 6.17% | 10.84% | 12.73% |
| Total | 2,074 | 1,965 | 2,263 | 100.00% | 100.00% | 100.00% |

Historical population
| Census | Pop. | Note | %± |
|---|---|---|---|
| 1910 | 1,551 | | — |
| 1920 | 1,791 | | 15.5% |
| 1930 | 1,415 | | −21.0% |
| 1940 | 1,608 | | 13.6% |
| 1950 | 1,503 | | −6.5% |
| 1960 | 1,480 | | −1.5% |
| 1970 | 1,322 | | −10.7% |
| 1980 | 1,522 | | 15.1% |
| 1990 | 1,692 | | 11.2% |
| 2000 | 2,074 | | 22.6% |
| 2010 | 1,965 | | −5.3% |
| 2020 | 2,263 | | 15.2% |
U.S. Decennial Census; 2015 Estimate

=== 2020 census ===
As of the 2020 census, Leavenworth had a population of 2,263. The median age was 42.2 years. 19.5% of residents were under the age of 18 and 22.3% of residents were 65 years of age or older. For every 100 females there were 86.6 males, and for every 100 females age 18 and over there were 87.7 males age 18 and over.

0.0% of residents lived in urban areas, while 100.0% lived in rural areas.

There were 958 households in Leavenworth, of which 31.8% had children under the age of 18 living in them. Of all households, 45.5% were married-couple households, 16.7% were households with a male householder and no spouse or partner present, and 28.2% were households with a female householder and no spouse or partner present. About 28.1% of all households were made up of individuals and 16.3% had someone living alone who was 65 years of age or older.

There were 1,210 housing units, of which 20.8% were vacant. The homeowner vacancy rate was 1.1% and the rental vacancy rate was 5.4%.

Racial composition as of the 2020 census
| Race | Number | Percentage |
|---|---|---|
| White | 1,859 | 82.1% |
| Black or African American | 13 | 0.6% |
| American Indian and Alaska Native | 5 | 0.2% |
| Asian | 19 | 0.8% |
| Native Hawaiian and Other Pacific Islander | 0 | 0.0% |
| Some other race | 173 | 7.6% |
| Two or more races | 194 | 8.6% |
| Hispanic or Latino (of any race) | 288 | 12.7% |

=== 2010 census ===
As of the 2010 census, there were 1,965 people, 908 households, and 500 families residing in the city. The population density was about 1,598 inhabitants per square mile (617.0/km^{2}). There were 1,241 housing units at an average density of about 1,009 per square mile (389.6/km^{2}). The racial makeup of the city was 92.9% White, 0.4% Black, 0.5% Native American, 0.6% Asian, 0.2% Pacific Islander, 3.9% from other races, and 1.6% from two or more races. Hispanic or Latino of any race were 10.8% of the population.

There were 908 households, of which about 24% had children under the age of 18 living with them, about 42% were married couples living together, about 10% had a female householder with no husband present, 3% had a male householder with no wife present, and about 45% were non-families. About 37% of all households were made up of individuals, and about 20% had someone living alone who was 65 years of age or older. The average household size was 2.16 and the average family size was 2.84.

The median age in the city was about 42 years. About 20% of residents were under the age of 18; about 8% were between the ages of 18 and 24; 25% were from 25 to 44; about 27% were from 45 to 64; and about 20% were 65 years of age or older. The gender makeup of the city was 46.7% male and 53.3% female.

== Arts and culture ==
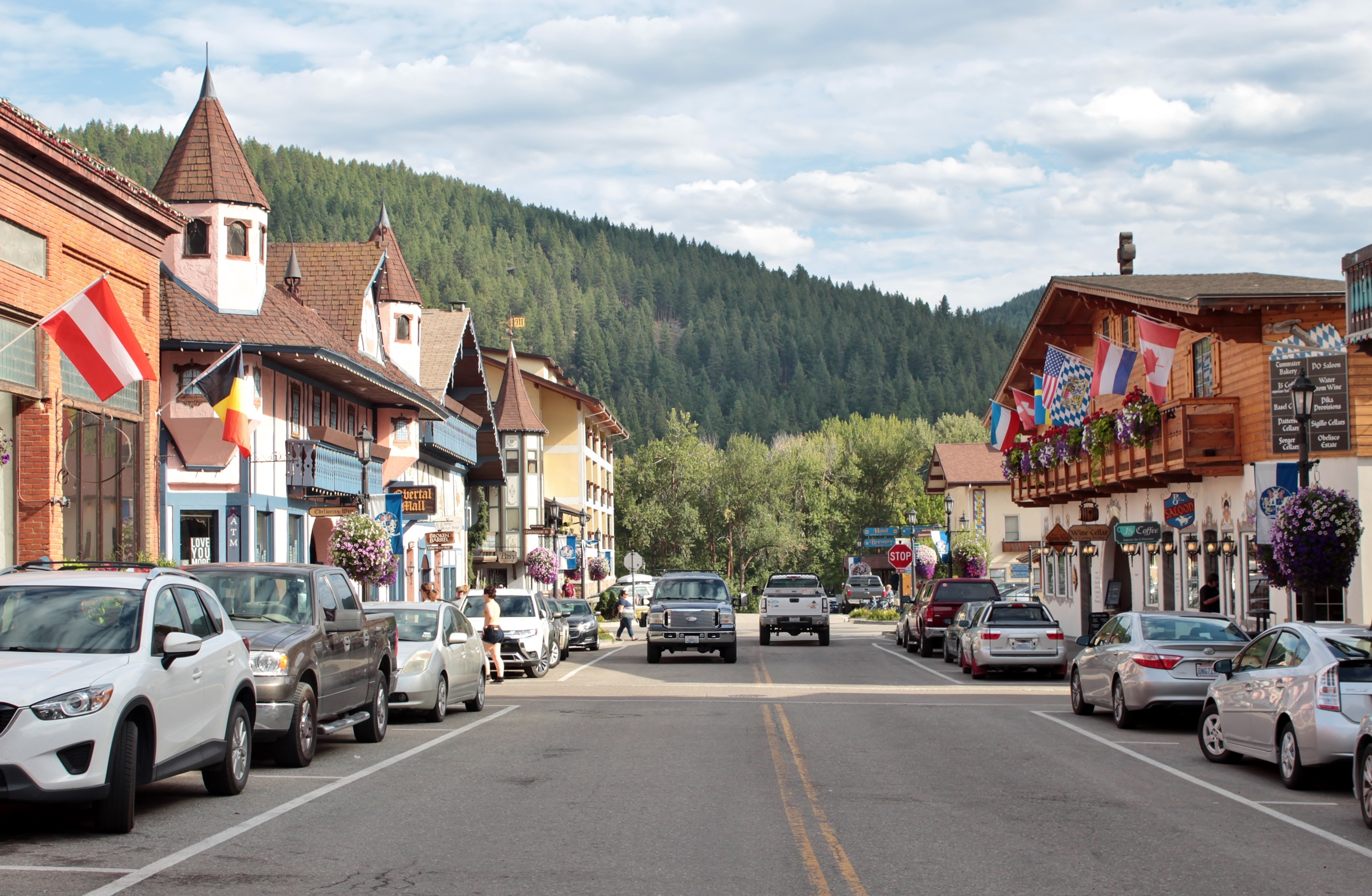
9th Street (Alpen Strasse) in Leavenworth

Leavenworth was designed with an Alpine German theme from the 1960s onward, with most buildings modeled after Bavarian settlements and adopting stereotypical fonts and names. However the town retains wide streets and large parking lots which are atypical of Bavaria. The Alpine German architectural theme is regulated by a design review board that approves plans for all new businesses, including chain establishments, leading to unusual designs for local fast-food restaurants and other retailers. Leavenworth's transformation into a theme town was inspired, and assisted, by Solvang, California. Later, the Washington town of Winthrop followed Leavenworth's example and adopted a Western town theme.

The Bavarianization of the town waned by the 1990s but was revived through the establishment of annual events, including an Oktoberfest begun in 1998. The Oktoberfest was later cancelled in 2020 and 2021 due to the COVID-19 pandemic before the original was moved to Wenatchee beginning in 2022, and the city's Chamber of Commerce started their own Oktoberfest event that remained in town. A Krampusnacht celebration was held in December 2020 and 2021 but later moved out of Leavenworth following complaints from religious groups.

Leavenworth is home to the Leavenworth Nutcracker Museum, which opened in 1995 and contains more than 7,000 nutcrackers dating from the 16th and 17th centuries to modern examples. The city hosts an annual Christmas tree lighting celebration in December that draws thousands of visitors and causes congestion on local highways. By 2001, Leavenworth had 19 annual weekend festivals and events, including a Maifest and Autumn Leaf Festival.

The city has also focused on outdoor recreation to draw tourists, including skiing, hiking, and mountain biking. The increased reliance on outdoor tourism has brought non-themed businesses to Leavenworth. The Leavenworth Ski Hill north of downtown was designated a U.S. historic district in 2013 due to its significance as a ski jumping area and its surviving Civilian Conservation Corps architecture. An adventure park that comprises a climbing wall and alpine coaster with 2,700 feet (820 m) of track and opened in 2023 on a hill on the southwest side of the city. As of 2021, Leavenworth had a total hotel capacity of 4,288 rooms.

== Government ==
Leavenworth has a mayor–council form of government with a mayor and seven city councilmembers all elected to four-year terms. Former councilmember Carl Florea was elected mayor in 2019 and re-elected in 2023. The day-to-day operations of the city government is led by an appointed city administrator; as of 2022, the city government has 44 employees.

Leavenworth is within the 8th congressional district and 12th legislative district, which both encompass most of Chelan County and parts of neighboring King and Snohomish counties. Unlike the rest of Chelan County, Leavenworth has voted for the Democratic Party's candidate by wide margins in presidential elections since 2012. The city had a 41-point margin for Kamala Harris in the 2024 presidential election, while Donald Trump won the county's overall vote.

== Education ==
Public schools in Leavenworth and the surrounding area are operated by the Cascade School District, which has over 1,100 students and serves the upper Wenatchee Valley. The district has one high school, located in Leavenworth, that was rebuilt in 2019.

The city is also home to the Upper Valley Christian School, a private K–12 school operated by the Leavenworth Church of the Nazarene. It was established in 1979 and has 52 students.

== Media ==
The city's weekly newspaper, the Leavenworth Echo, was founded in 1904 and independently operated until it was acquired in 2023 by Ward Media. Jazz radio station KOHO-FM was founded in 1999 and broadcast from Leavenworth until it switched to Northwest Public Radio's feed in 2022. Leavenworth is also part of the Seattle–Tacoma television media market as defined by Nielsen Media Research.

Leavenworth's public library is operated by the NCW Libraries system, which serves five counties in Central Washington. The library occupies 3,000 square feet (280 m^{2}) inside the city hall building on U.S. Route 2; a study to move the library to a closed elementary school was approved by the Leavenworth city council in 2024.

== Infrastructure ==
=== Transportation ===
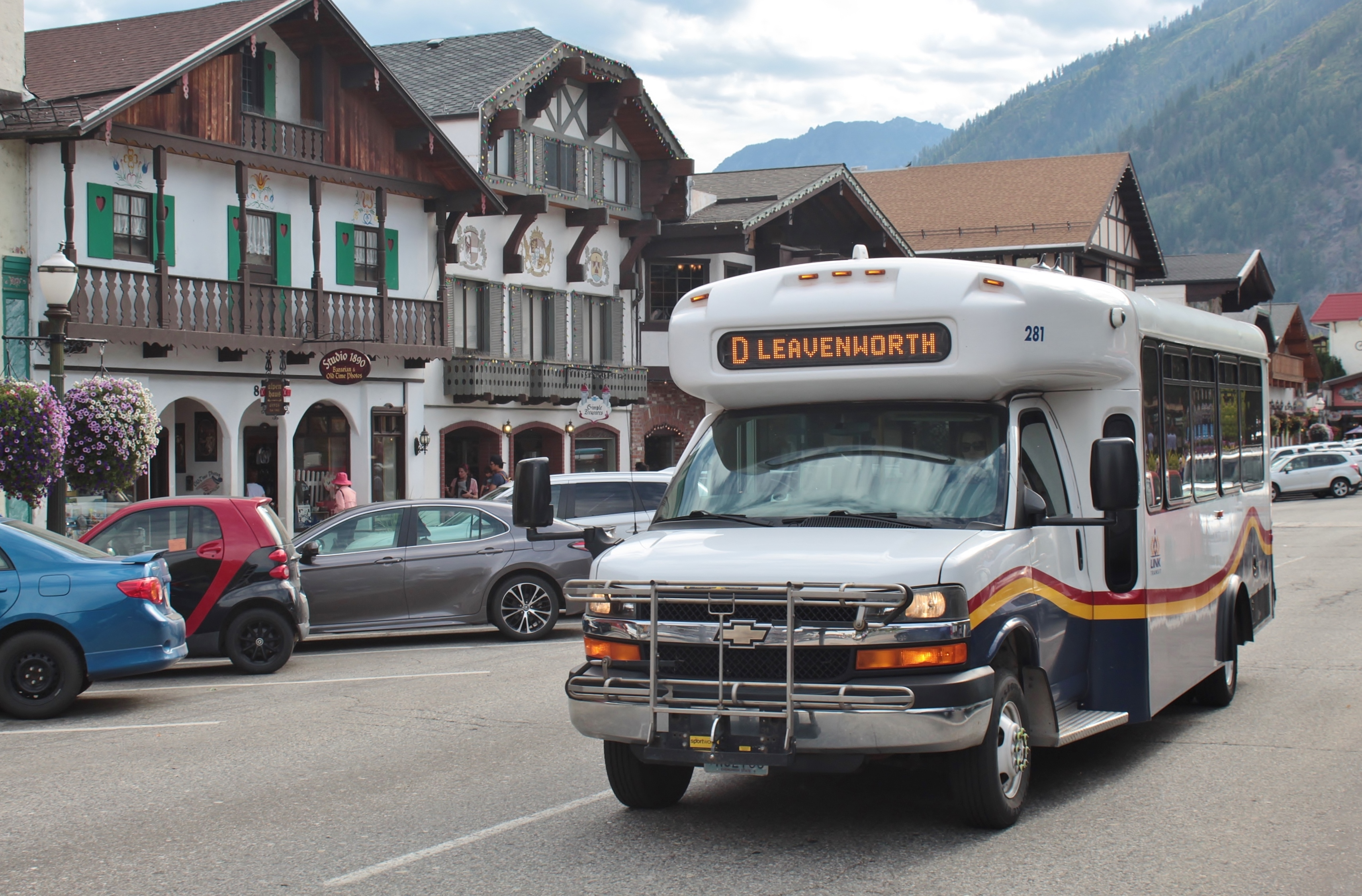
Link Transit provides transit service within Leavenworth.

Leavenworth is located on U.S. Route 2, which continues west across Stevens Pass to Snohomish County and east towards Wenatchee. The highway has turn lanes through most of the city and ranges from two to four lanes wide; it is highly congested during seasonal events, which has sometimes required law enforcement to direct traffic. The Chumstick Highway (former State Route 209) travels north from Leavenworth to Plain and Lake Wenatchee State Park.

The city is served by Amtrak's Empire Builder train, which stops daily at Icicle Station near downtown. Link Transit provides local and inter-city public transit services that connect Leavenworth to Wenatchee, as well as local paratransit and a downtown shuttle. A park-and-ride lot in downtown Leavenworth with 30 stalls is served by Link Transit, along with the Wilkommen Park and Ride opened in June 2019. The city also has several private taxi companies and inter-city bus operators, including stops for Northwestern Trailways and Amtrak Thruway.

=== Utilities ===
Electric power in Leavenworth and surrounding communities is provided by Chelan County Public Utility District, a nonprofit municipal corporation which serves the entire county. Over 80 percent of the utility's electricity is sourced from hydroelectric dams.

The Leavenworth city government provides tap water to over 1,404 residential and commercial customers with an estimated annual use of 320 million US gallons (1.2 billion litres). Its primary source is Icicle Creek, which originates in the Cascades near Stevens Pass and also serves a federal fish hatchery and nearby orchards. The city's use of Icicle Creek was the subject of a decade-long dispute with the Washington State Department of Ecology and conservationists that was settled in 2023 with a revised water rights agreement. Leavenworth also sources a portion of its tap water from three wells near the Wenatchee River that were constructed from 1989 to 2014.

All curbside collection of garbage, recycling, and yard waste has been contracted by the city government to Waste Management since 2019. Prior to the agreement, Waste Management only collected recycling while the city government disposed of garbage.

=== Healthcare ===
Leavenworth has one public hospital, Cascade Medical Center, with 12 beds designated for acute care and an on-site rural health clinic. The hospital is operated by the Chelan County Public Hospital District No. 1 and has 150 employees. The hospital was established in 1923 as the Cascade Sanitarium with 26 beds and was expanded to 32 beds in 1947 with the construction of a new wing. A public hospital district was formed in 1965 to fund a new building, which opened in the following decade with 33 beds and was named the Cascade Medical Center.

A 16-bed satellite facility for the Cascade Medical Center in Wenatchee opened in July 1997 through a partnership with the Wenatchee Valley Clinic; the rooms included Bavarian-style artwork that was donated by Leavenworth residents. The satellite hospital was intended to improve revenues for Cascade, which had few patients in Leavenworth, but instead left the hospital with $4.7 million in debt. Cascade sold its bed licenses to the Wenatchee Valley Clinic in 2001 for $2.5 million to resolve its remaining debt and end the partnership. In 2005, voters approved funding for a new $14 million facility for Cascade in Leavenworth through a $8.8 million bond measure. The new hospital opened in November 2010 with a new acute care unit; it was followed by renovations in 2011 to the existing building to house lab space and a larger lobby.

== Notable people ==
- Cleo Baldon, architect and furniture designer
- George Boomer, newspaper editor and political activist
- Martin R. Bradley, state legislator in Michigan
- Dean Derby, professional American football player
- Maria Newman, composer and violinist
- Jack Parnell, former U.S. Deputy Secretary of Agriculture
- Felipe Pulido, Catholic priest
- Belle Reeves, state legislator and Washington Secretary of State
- Frank Reeves, state legislator and newspaper publisher

== See also ==
- Frankenmuth, Michigan
- Helen, Georgia
- Solvang, California
- Tudorbethan architecture
