= Sandpoint station =

Railway station in Idaho, U.S.

Sandpoint, ID
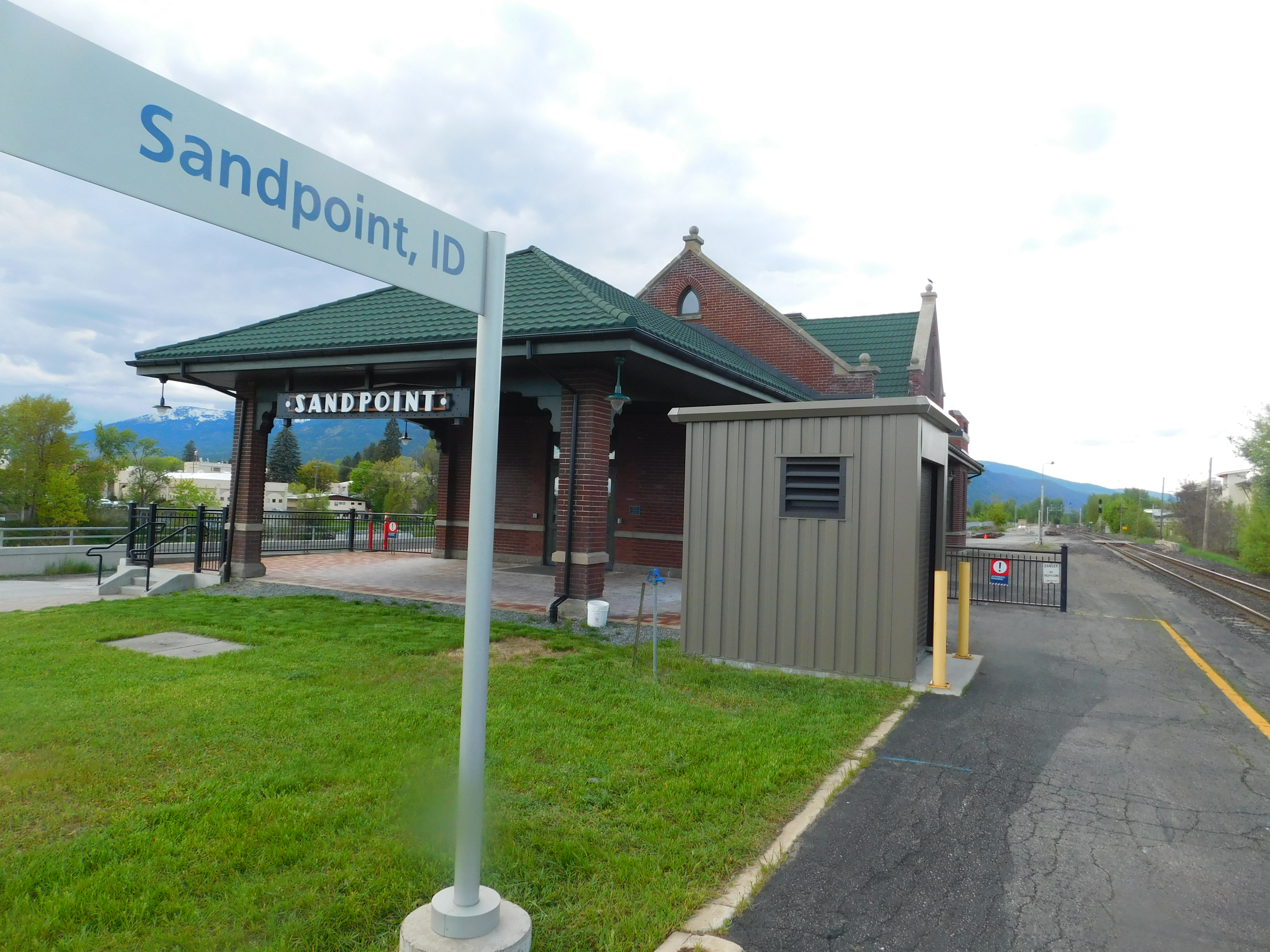
- Sandpoint station, May 2017

General information
- Location: 450 Railroad Avenue; Sandpoint, Idaho; United States
- Coordinates: 48.2764041°N 116.5481915°W
- Owner: BNSF Railway
- Line: BNSF Kootenai River Subdivision
- Platforms: 1 side platform
- Tracks: 1

Construction
- Accessible: Yes

Other information
- Station code: Amtrak: SPT

History
- Opened: 1916
- Rebuilt: 2015

Passengers
- FY 2025: 5,809 (Amtrak)

Services
Preceding station	Amtrak	Following station
Spokane toward Seattle or Portland	Empire Builder	Libby toward Chicago
Former services
Preceding station	Amtrak	Following station
Spokane toward Seattle	North Coast Hiawatha	Paradise toward Chicago
Preceding station	Northern Pacific Railway	Following station
Granite toward Seattle or Tacoma	Main Line	Kootenai toward St. Paul
- Sandpoint Burlington Northern Railway Station
- U.S. National Register of Historic Places
- Area: 0.3 acres (0.1 ha)
- NRHP reference No.: 73000682
- Added to NRHP: July 5, 1973
Location

Sandpoint station is a train station along Amtrak's Empire Builder line in Sandpoint, Idaho, as well as the only operating Amtrak station in Idaho since 1997. The station site is owned by BNSF Railway.

The station building is the oldest remaining active passenger depot of the former Northern Pacific Railway. It was listed on the National Register of Historic Places in 1973 and is known therein as the Sandpoint Burlington Northern Railroad Station, or the Northern Pacific Depot.

In June 2009 Amtrak announced that it was considering a new stop in Sandpoint, citing concerns about the new Sand Creek Byway. City officials and the Idaho Department of Transportation (ITD) pledged additional funds to support retaining Amtrak service at the original depot.

As part of mitigation efforts related to the construction of the byway, ITD paid BNSF approximately $922,000 to stabilize the depot or design and erect a replacement facility. As of winter 2013, Amtrak was working with station owner BNSF to modify the existing lease to include parts of the building and the platform. Once this process is completed, Amtrak will move forward with design work for the rehabilitation; in conjunction with this project, Amtrak will also fund a new accessible compliant concrete platform with tactile edging. In May 2015, the station was restored at a cost of $926,000 and featured a new roof with green tiles similar in appearance to the originals, and a refurbished waiting room.
