= Oroville station =

Train station in California

Oroville
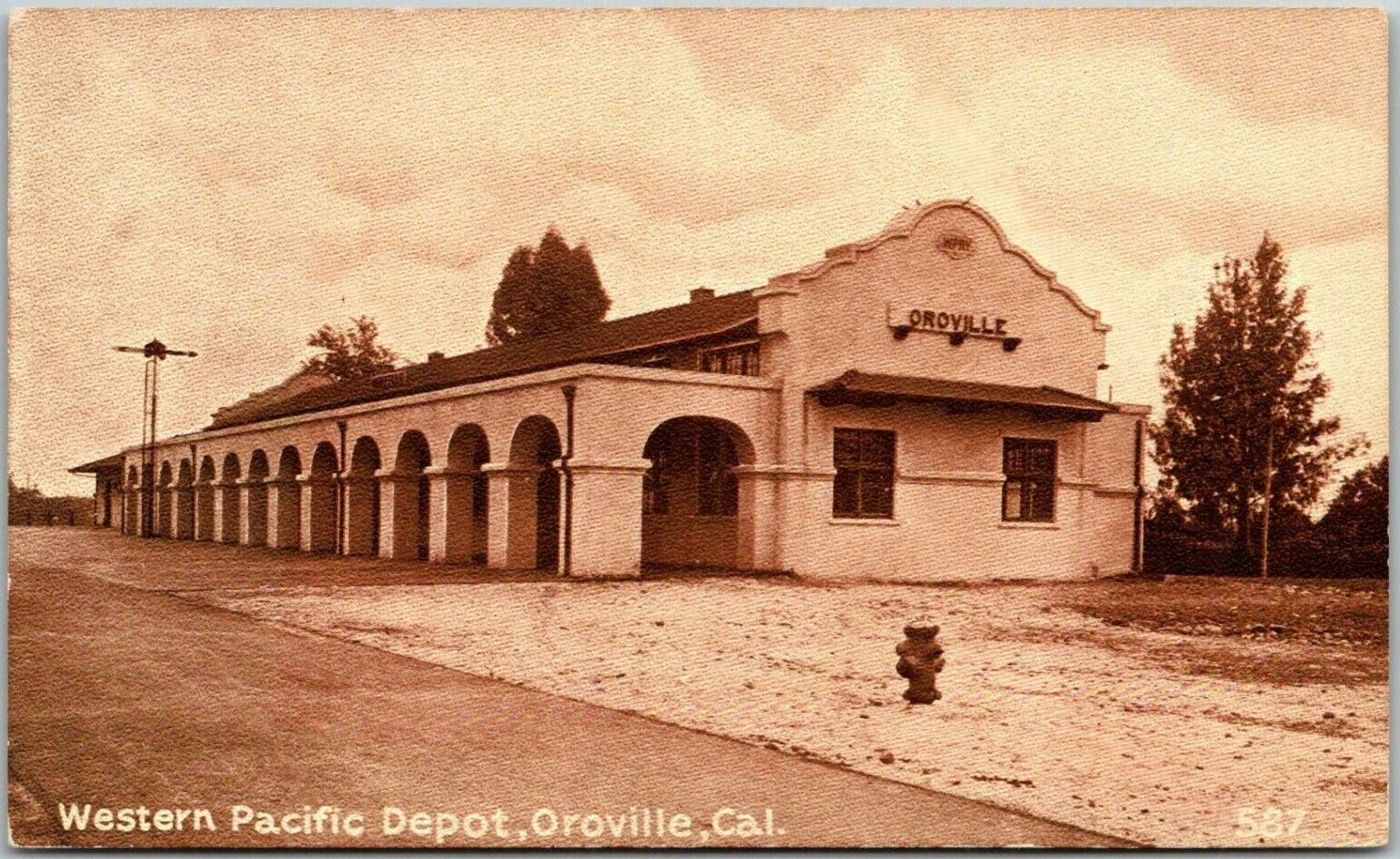
- Postcard of the station, seen here before 1915

General information
- Location: 2191 High Street; Oroville, California
- Coordinates: 39.512411°N 121.552303°W
- Line(s): WP Feather River Route

History
- Opened: 1910
- Closed: 1970
- Original company: Western Pacific Railroad

Services
Preceding station	Western Pacific Railroad	Following station
Marysville toward Oakland	California Zephyr	Keddie toward Chicago
Termalito toward Oakland	Feather River Route	Shippee toward Salt Lake City

Oroville is a former train station in Oroville, California. The building was constructed in 1910 as the town's stop along the Western Pacific Railroad Feather River Route. The railroad discontinued their passenger trains in 1970, leaving Oroville without rail services. The Chico Electric Railway had built an electric interurban railway line to the town with a route down High Street and its own depot two blocks west of the Western Pacific's.

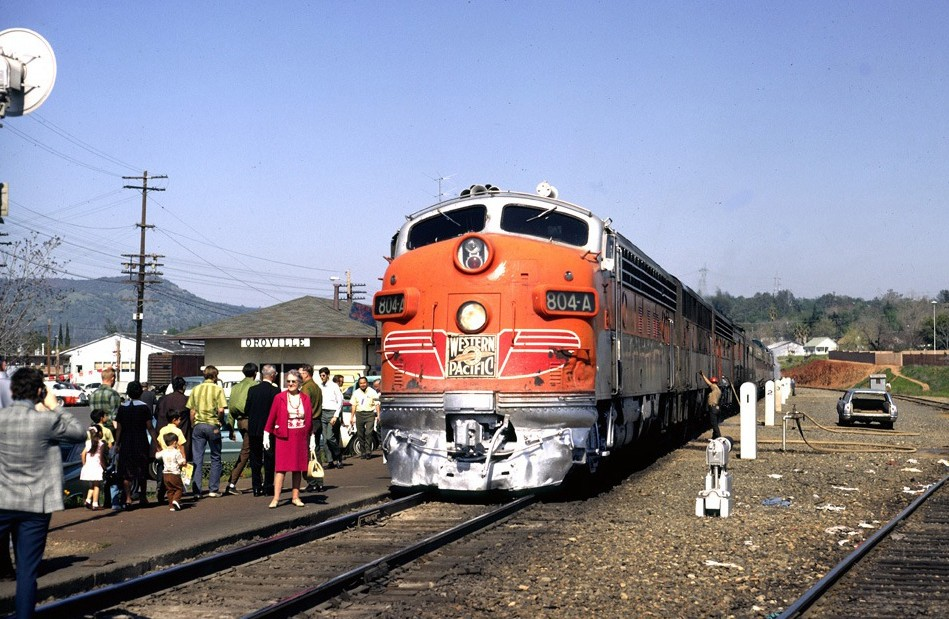
The final westbound California Zephyr in 1970

The station was converted to a restaurant after being sold by the WP. A steak house opened in 1977, called The Depot, which would go on to be converted to a brewpub in 2007: Western Pacific Brewing and Dining. By 2017, with the building up for sale, the Butte County Association of Governments had plans to redevelop the facility as a commuter bus station, but were unable to secure funding.
