= Wenatchee Valley Mall =

Coordinates: 47°24′42″N 120°17′21″W

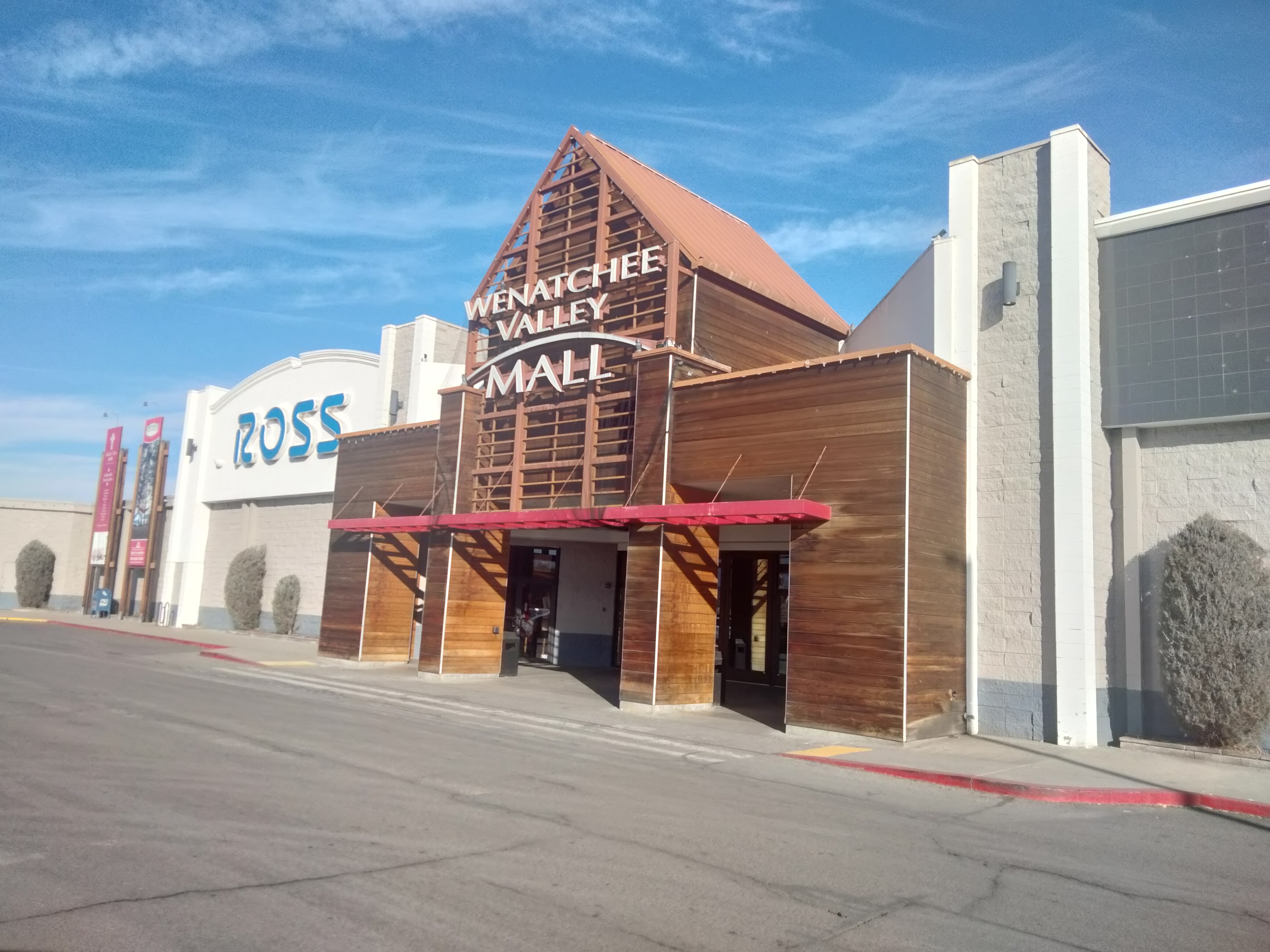
- Location: East Wenatchee, Washington, United States
- Address: 511 Valley Mall Parkway
- Opened: 1973
- Owner: Namdar Realty Group
- Num. of stores: 58
- Num. of anchor tenants: 4
- Floor area: 340,786 square feet (31,660.1 m^{2})
- Floors: 1 (2 in Macy's)
- Website: wenatcheevalleymall.com

Wenatchee Valley Mall is a shopping mall located in East Wenatchee, Washington. It opened in 1973 and is anchored by Bed Bath & Beyond, Macy's, Ross Dress For Less, and Sportsman's Warehouse.

The gross leasable area of the mall is 340,786 square feet (31,660.1 m^{2}), meaning it is smaller than a regional mall, per the definitions of the International Council of Shopping Centers. However, despite its small size, Wenatchee Valley Mall is the only mall within an 80-mile (130 km) radius of East Wenatchee, and thus serves a population of over 200,000 people.

== History ==
The mall opened in 1973 with Sears (1973), Lamonts (2nd phase), and Buttrey-Osco Food & Drug. The Bon Marché had planned to add a store at Wenatchee Valley Mall as early as 1996; however, the store did not open until taking the former Buttrey building in 2001. This store became Bon-Macy's in 2003, and Macy's in 2005. Gottschalks, which replaced Lamonts in 2000, closed in 2003, and was replaced with Bed Bath & Beyond and Ross Dress For Less.

Sears closed in 2013 and its building was sold to Sportsman's Warehouse the same year. In turn, Sears opened a smaller-format store.
