= Grant Transit Authority =

Public Transit Operator

- Founded: November 5, 1996
- Headquarters: 116 W. 5th Avenue; Moses Lake, Washington
- Locale: Grant County, Washington
- Service type: Bus service
- Routes: 10
- Annual ridership: 135,021 (2025)
- Fuel type: Diesel
- General Manager: Eric Loomis
- Website: granttransit.com

The Grant Transit Authority (GTA) is a public transit operator in Grant County, Washington. It operates 10 routes, including intercity services that converge in the city of Moses Lake. The agency's routes have been zero-fare since 2020.

== History ==
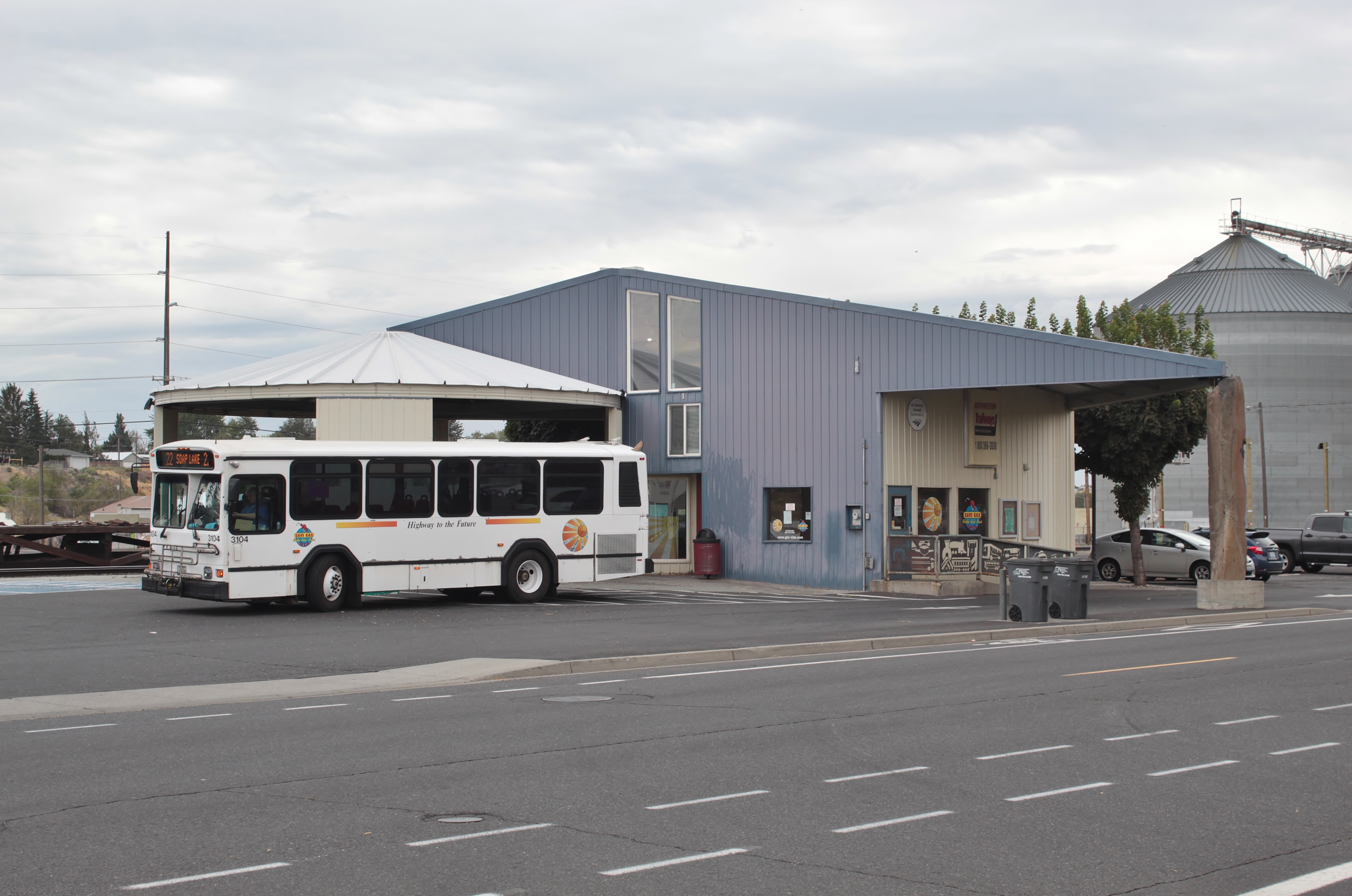
A GTA bus at Ephrata station

A demonstration project with four buses serving Moses Lake and surrounding areas began in November 1995. The project, deemed a success after one year, led to a November 1996 vote to establish a public transportation benefit area (PTBA) to fund a permanent system. The vote passed, creating a 0.2 percent sales tax and allowing regular service to begin and expand the following year. The first buses began operating on November 5, 1996.

The PTBA boundaries were expanded in 1998 to include Quincy, which had opted out of the 1996 vote, thus encompassing all of Grant County. The Grant Transit Authority previously partnered with a local non-profit organization, People for People, for operations but became independent in October 2013. Construction began on a new transit center in downtown Moses Lake in 2016 after several years of planning. The transit center opened on August 1, 2017, with an indoor waiting area, a customer service desk, and a park-and-ride lot. The Grant Transit Authority debuted inter-county commuter services during the same month, connecting Moses Lake to Ellensburg and Wenatchee on weekdays. Several routes were consolidated in a major service change that took effect in April 2019.

The Grant Transit Authority temporarily ceased collection of fares in April 2020 due to the COVID-19 pandemic in Washington. The policy was extended several times and made permanent on September 1, 2022, after the state government approved a statewide elimination of youth transit fares. Prior to 2020, the adult and youth fare for all service had been $1, with a reduced fare of $0.50 for eligible seniors. A new transit center at Ephrata station opened in September 2025.

== Service ==
As of 2026, the Grant Transit Authority operates 10 fixed routes that only operate on weekdays, including several circulator routes. Its main hub is the Moses Lake Multimodal Transit Center, which also serves as the agency's headquarters. GTA has dial-a-ride service in some communities as well as paratransit that is operated directly by the agency; until 2026, the paratransit service was contracted out to People for People, a nonprofit organization. In 2025, there were 135,021 passenger trips on GTA's fixed routes.

== Administration ==
The agency is led by a board of directors with 10 members, primarily from local jurisdictions. These comprise one member of the Grant County Commission, the mayors of Electric City and Ephrata, and city councilmembers from Coulee City, Moses Lake, Quincy, Soap Lake, Warden, and Wilson Creek. There is one non-voting member from the local chapter of the Amalgamated Transit Union.
