= Expo '74 (train) =

Former American passenger train service

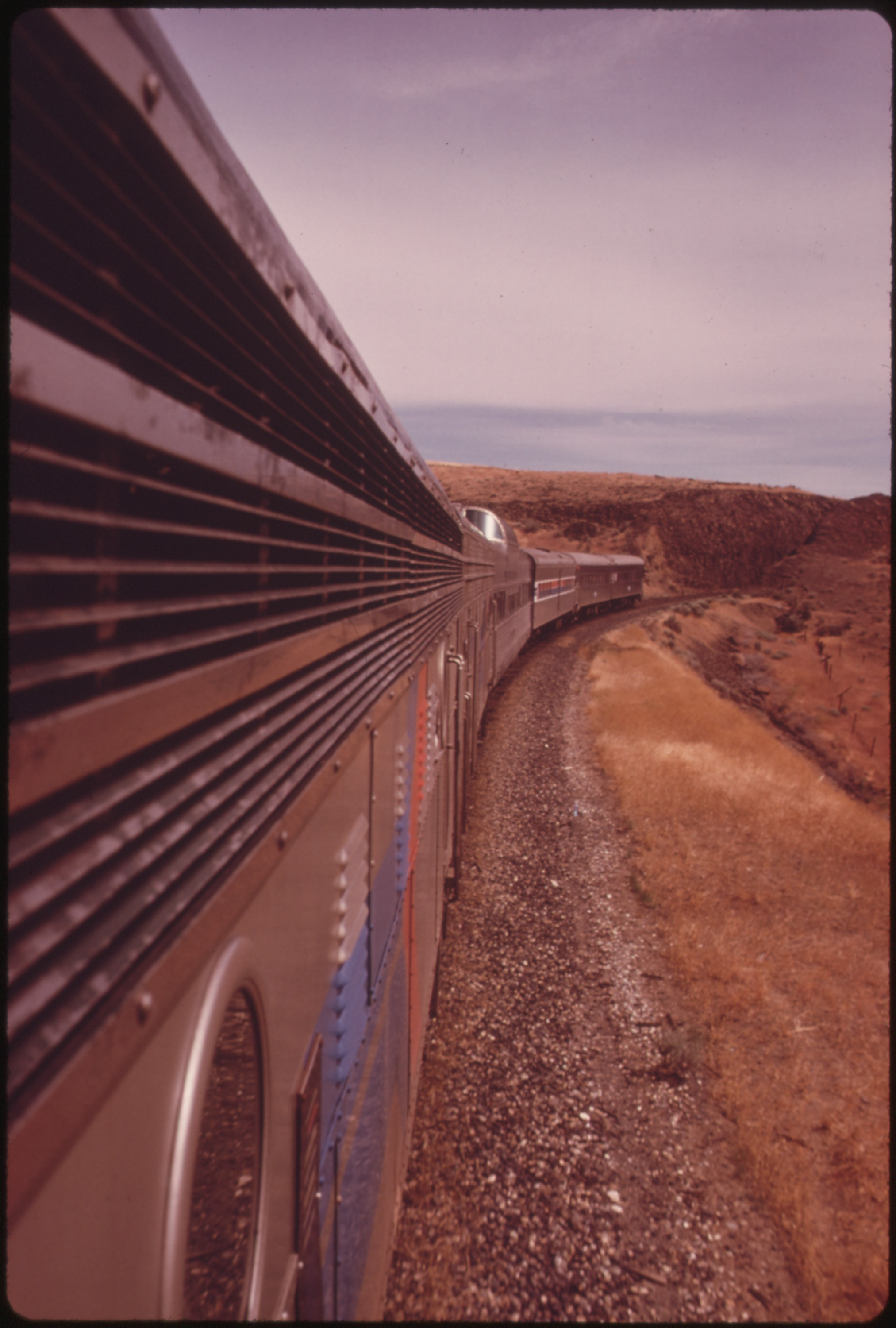
- The Expo '74 rounds a curve near Wenatchee, Washington, on the ex-Great Northern route. Note the dome coach.

Overview
- Locale: Washington
- First service: May 19, 1974
- Last service: September 14, 1974
- Former operator: Amtrak
- Ridership: 16,675, about 70 passengers per trip

Route
- Termini: Seattle, Washington; Spokane, Washington
- Average journey time: 8.5 hours
- Service frequency: Daily

Technical
- Track gauge: 4 ft 8 1/2 in (1,435 mm)

The Expo '74 was a passenger train operated by Amtrak between Spokane and Seattle, Washington. It operated in the summer months of 1974 in coordination with its namesake, Expo '74. With the addition of the Expo '74 to the Empire Builder and North Coast Hiawatha, Amtrak provided thrice-daily service between Seattle and Spokane, the highest level seen since Amtrak's formation and unmatched since.

== History ==
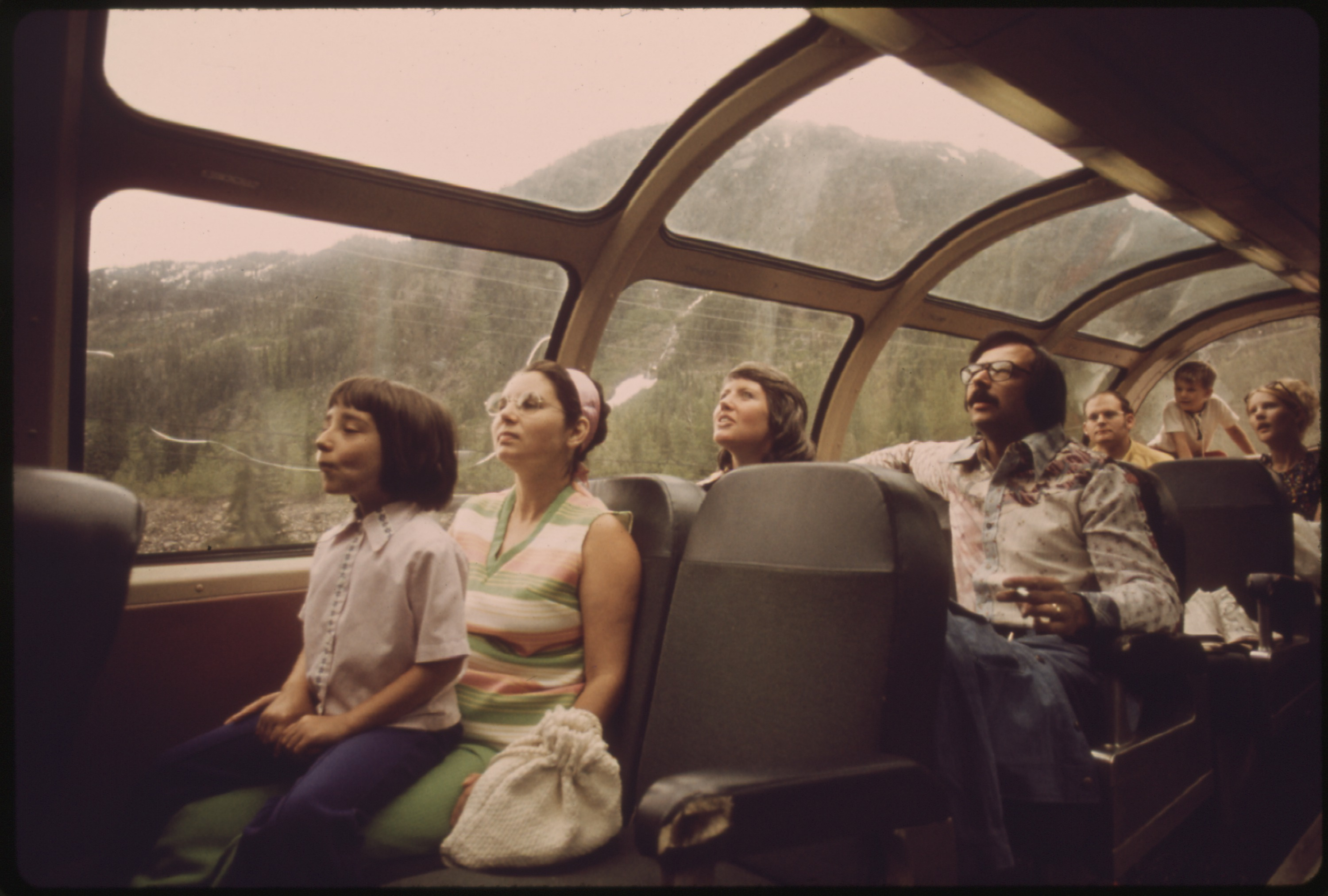
Passengers in the observation car as the passenger train passes through the Cascade Mountain Range

In 1973, Amtrak operated two trains between Seattle and Spokane: the daily Empire Builder and the thrice-weekly North Coast Hiawatha. Both were long-distance trains which originated in Chicago. Each took different routes west from Spokane, though both routes had belonged to the merged Burlington Northern Railroad since 1970. The North Coast Hiawatha used the ex-Northern Pacific Railway via Pasco, Washington, while beginning in 1973 the Empire Builder used the ex-Great Northern Railway via Stevens Pass. Neither train provided convenient timings between the two cities, and the westbound trains were likely to be late because of accumulated delays.

In late 1973, Amtrak studied increasing service to Spokane in preparation for Expo '74, an environmentally-themed world's fair scheduled to be held in Spokane the following summer and expected to draw millions of visitors. Amtrak considered two options: restoring direct service between Spokane and Portland, Oregon, which had not existed since Amtrak's creation in 1971, and supplemental service between Seattle and Spokane. This planning took place during a period of rising ridership spurred by the 1973 oil crisis. Ultimately, Amtrak chose to augment its existing services, adding another train to the Great Northern route. Spokane-Portland service would come in 1981 when Amtrak restored the Empire Builder's Portland section.

Amtrak began operation of the new train on May 19, 1974. The overall travel time was 8.5 hours, though Amtrak protested to the Burlington Northern that 7.5 hours was possible. Privately, Amtrak engineers thought the trip could be done in six hours. The North Coast Hiawatha began daily operation at the same time, raising the service level between Spokane and Seattle to three daily round-trips, with a viable daylight schedule in both directions:

Expo '74	Empire Builder	North Coast Hiawatha		Expo '74	Empire Builder	North Coast Hiawatha
8:00 a.m.	2:00 a.m.	11:40 a.m.	Spokane	9:00 p.m.	11:10 p.m.	2:30 a.m.
4:30 p.m.	12:05 p.m.	8:00 p.m.	Seattle	12:30 p.m.	1:15 p.m.	6:00 p.m.
Condensed Spokane–Seattle schedule; intermediate stops not shown.

On its inauguration the train carried six cars, including a dome coach and a dining car. Ridership did not meet expectations and the size of the train fell to three cars. Total ridership came to 16,675, or 70 passengers per trip. The train lost $203,000 and Amtrak did not retain it when it issued its fall schedule. The train made its last run on September 14, 1974. The next day the North Coast Hiawatha resumed its thrice-weekly operation, dropping the corridor back to ten trains per week. That August, the three trains had posted the best on-time performance in the country, with 97% of all trains arriving at their destinations within 20 minutes of their scheduled arrival time.
