= Northwestern Stage Lines =

Bus transportation provider in Spokane, Washington

- Parent: Salt Lake Express
- Headquarters: 4611 South Ben Franklin Lane
- Locale: Spokane, WA
- Service type: Intercity coach service
- Alliance: Greyhound Lines
- Website: northwesterntrailways.com

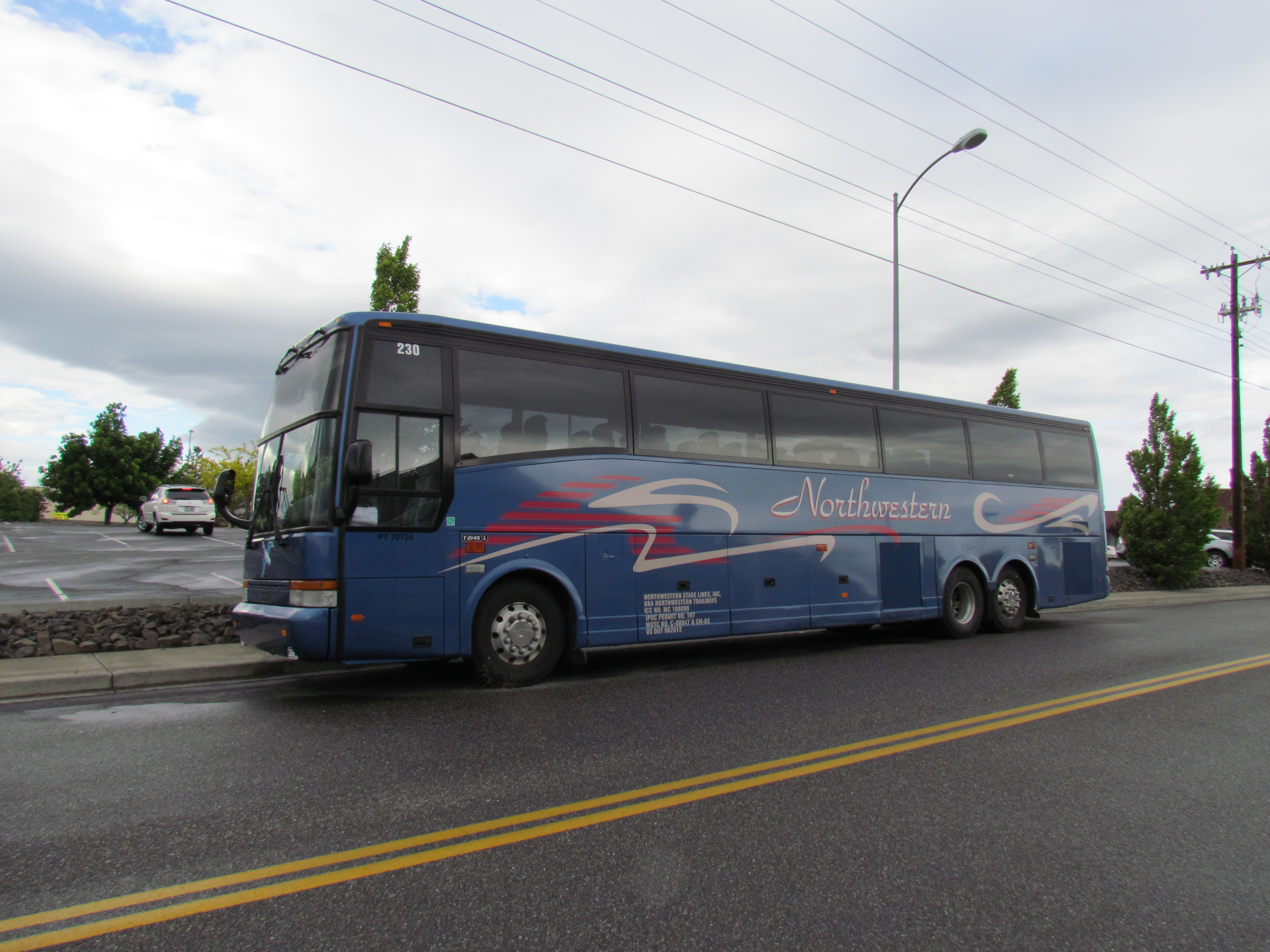
Northwestern Trailways bus in Kennewick, Washington

Northwestern Stage Lines is an intercity common carrier of passengers by bus serving Washington and Idaho. It has been a subsidiary of Salt Lake Express since 2022 and is based in Spokane, Washington.

== Routes ==
- Spokane to Seattle/Everett/Tacoma via Interstate 90, U.S. Highway 2 over scenic Stevens Pass, and Interstate 5.
- Spokane to Boise via US-195, US-95 and ID-55.

== Apple Line ==
In 2009, a new 160 mile bus route from Omak, through Wenatchee to Ellensburg was added as part of the Travel Washington network.

== See also ==
- Trailways Transportation System
- Amtrak Thruway
