= National Register of Historic Places listings in Douglas County, Washington =

Location of Douglas County in Washington

This list presents the full set of buildings, structures, objects, sites, or districts designated on the National Register of Historic Places in Douglas County, Washington, and offers brief descriptive information about each of them. The National Register recognizes places of national, state, or local historic significance across the United States. Out of over 90,000 National Register sites nationwide, Washington is home to approximately 1,500, and 53 of those are found partially or wholly in Douglas County.

This National Park Service list is complete through NPS recent listings posted September 25, 2026.

== Current listings ==
	Name on the Register	Image	Date listed	Location	City or town	Description
1	45DO1236	45DO1236	April 5, 2021 (#100004631)	Address Restricted	Palisades vicinity.	Spiritually Significant Rock Features of the Southern Columbia Plateau and Okanogan Highlands.
2	45DO1237	45DO1237	April 5, 2021 (#100004632)	Address Restricted	Palisades vicinity.	Spiritually Significant Rock Features of the Southern Columbia Plateau and Okanogan Highlands.
3	45DO1238	45DO1238	July 5, 2023 (#100009085)	Address Restricted	Palisades vicinity.	Spiritually Significant Rock Features of the Southern Columbia Plateau and Okanogan Highlands.
4	45DO1239	45DO1239	April 5, 2021 (#100004634)	Address Restricted	Palisades vicinity.	Spiritually Significant Rock Features of the Southern Columbia Plateau and Okanogan Highlands.
5	45DO1240	45DO1240	May 27, 2021 (#100004635)	Address Restricted	Palisades vicinity.	Spiritually Significant Rock Features of the Southern Columbia Plateau and Okanogan Highlands.
6	45DO1241	45DO1241	May 27, 2021 (#100004636)	Address Restricted	Palisades vicinity.	Spiritually Significant Rock Features of the Southern Columbia Plateau and Okanogan Highlands.
7	45DO1242	45DO1242	May 27, 2021 (#100004637)	Address Restricted	Palisades vicinity.	Spiritually Significant Rock Features of the Southern Columbia Plateau and Okanogan Highlands.
8	45DO1412	45DO1412	June 5, 2025 (#100011877)	Address Restricted	Palisades vicinity.	Spiritually Significant Rock Features of the Southern Columbia Plateau and Okanogan Highlands.
9	45DO1413	45DO1413	June 5, 2025 (#100011878)	Address Restricted	Palisades vicinity.	Spiritually Significant Rock Features of the Southern Columbia Plateau and Okanogan Highlands.
10	45DO1414	45DO1414	June 5, 2025 (#100011879)	Address Restricted	Palisades vicinity.	Spiritually Significant Rock Features of the Southern Columbia Plateau and Okanogan Highlands.
11	45DO1415	45DO1415	June 5, 2025 (#100011880)	Address Restricted	Palisades vicinity.	Spiritually Significant Rock Features of the Southern Columbia Plateau and Okanogan Highlands.
12	45DO1416	45DO1416	June 9, 2025 (#100011900)	Address Restricted	Palisades vicinity.	Spiritually Significant Rock Features of the Southern Columbia Plateau and Okanogan Highlands.
13	45DO1417	45DO1417	June 9, 2025 (#100011901)	Address Restricted	Palisades vicinity.	Spiritually Significant Rock Features of the Southern Columbia Plateau and Okanogan Highlands.
14	45DO1418	45DO1418	June 9, 2025 (#100011902)	Address Restricted	Palisades vicinity.	Spiritually Significant Rock Features of the Southern Columbia Plateau and Okanogan Highlands.
15	45DO1419	45DO1419	June 9, 2025 (#100011903)	Address Restricted	Palisades vicinity.	Spiritually Significant Rock Features of the Southern Columbia Plateau and Okanogan Highlands.
16	45DO1421	45DO1421	June 9, 2025 (#100011904)	Address Restricted	Palisades vicinity.	Spiritually Significant Rock Features of the Southern Columbia Plateau and Okanogan Highlands.
17	45DO1422	45DO1422	July 23, 2025 (#100012033)	Address Restricted	Palisades vicinity.	Spiritually Significant Rock Features of the Southern Columbia Plateau and Okanogan Highlands.
18	45DO1423	45DO1423	July 23, 2025 (#100012034)	Address Restricted	Palisades vicinity.	Spiritually Significant Rock Features of the Southern Columbia Plateau and Okanogan Highlands.
19	45DO1424	45DO1424	July 23, 2025 (#100012035)	Address Restricted	Palisades vicinity.	Spiritually Significant Rock Features of the Southern Columbia Plateau and Okanogan Highlands.
20	45DO1425	45DO1425	July 23, 2025 (#100012036)	Address Restricted	Palisades vicinity.	Spiritually Significant Rock Features of the Southern Columbia Plateau and Okanogan Highlands.
21	45DO1426	45DO1426	July 23, 2025 (#100012037)	Address Restricted	Palisades vicinity.	Spiritually Significant Rock Features of the Southern Columbia Plateau and Okanogan Highlands.
22	45DO1427	45DO1427	September 15, 2025 (#100012223)	Address Restricted	Palisades vicinity.	Spiritually Significant Rock Features of the Southern Columbia Plateau and Okanogan Highlands.
23	45DO1428	45DO1428	September 15, 2025 (#100012224)	Address Restricted	Palisades vicinity.	Spiritually Significant Rock Features of the Southern Columbia Plateau and Okanogan Highlands.
24	45DO1429	45DO1429	September 15, 2025 (#100012225)	Address Restricted	Palisades vicinity.	Spiritually Significant Rock Features of the Southern Columbia Plateau and Okanogan Highlands.
25	45DO1430	45DO1430	September 15, 2025 (#100012226)	Address Restricted	Palisades vicinity.	Spiritually Significant Rock Features of the Southern Columbia Plateau and Okanogan Highlands.
26	45DO1431	45DO1431	September 15, 2025 (#100012227)	Address Restricted	Palisades vicinity.	Spiritually Significant Rock Features of the Southern Columbia Plateau and Okanogan Highlands.
27	45DO1432	45DO1432	September 15, 2025 (#100012228)	Address Restricted	Palisades vicinity.	Spiritually Significant Rock Features of the Southern Columbia Plateau and Okanogan Highlands.
28	45DO1433	45DO1433	September 15, 2025 (#100012229)	Address Restricted	Palisades vicinity.	Spiritually Significant Rock Features of the Southern Columbia Plateau and Okanogan Highlands.
29	45DO1434	45DO1434	March 12, 2026 (#100012800)	Address Restricted	Palisades vicinity.	Spiritually Significant Rock Features of the Southern Columbia Plateau and Okanogan Highlands.
30	45DO1435	45DO1435	March 12, 2026 (#100012801)	Address Restricted	Palisades vicinity.	Spiritually Significant Rock Features of the Southern Columbia Plateau and Okanogan Highlands.
31	45DO1436	45DO1436	March 13, 2026 (#100012806)	Address Restricted	Palisades vicinity.	Spiritually Significant Rock Features of the Southern Columbia Plateau and Okanogan Highlands.
32	45DO1437	45DO1437	March 13, 2026 (#100012807)	Address Restricted	Palisades vicinity.	Spiritually Significant Rock Features of the Southern Columbia Plateau and Okanogan Highlands.
33	45DO1438	45DO1438	March 13, 2026 (#100012809)	Address Restricted	Palisades vicinity.	Spiritually Significant Rock Features of the Southern Columbia Plateau and Okanogan Highlands.
34	45DO1439	45DO1439	March 13, 2026 (#100012808)	Address Restricted	Palisades vicinity.	Spiritually Significant Rock Features of the Southern Columbia Plateau and Okanogan Highlands.
35	45DO1440	45DO1440	March 13, 2026 (#100012810)	Address Restricted	Palisades vicinity.	Spiritually Significant Rock Features of the Southern Columbia Plateau and Okanogan Highlands.
36	Badger Mountain Lookout	Badger Mountain Lookout	December 27, 1990 (#90001915)	Near summit of Badger Mountain; 47°30′37″N 120°14′34″W	East Wenatchee vicinity.	
37	William J. Canton House	William J. Canton House	June 16, 1988 (#88000737)	305 W. Ash St. 47°38′22″N 120°04′35″W	Waterville	
38	Columbia River Bridge at Bridgeport	Columbia River Bridge at Bridgeport	May 31, 1995 (#95000632)	WA 17 over the Columbia River; 48°00′04″N 119°39′13″W	Bridgeport	Bridges of Washington State MPS
39	Columbia River Bridge at Wenatchee	Columbia River Bridge at Wenatchee	May 24, 1995 (#95000623)	US 2 over the Columbia River; 47°24′36″N 120°17′41″W	Wenatchee	Bridges of Washington State MPS
40	Douglas County Courthouse	Douglas County Courthouse	September 5, 1975 (#75001849)	Off U.S. 2; 47°38′46″N 120°04′00″W	Waterville	
41	Downtown Waterville Historic District	Downtown Waterville Historic District	May 19, 1988 (#88000629)	Locust and Chelan Sts. 47°39′00″N 120°04′26″W	Waterville	
42	Gallaher House	Gallaher House	June 27, 1995 (#75001848)	600 12th St. 48°00′28″N 119°40′31″W	Mansfield	Originally listed in 1975 at original site 11.5 NW of Mansfield, Ref #75001848, and was delisted at original site January 11, 1995
43	Lutheran St. Paul's Kirche	Lutheran St. Paul's Kirche	April 12, 1982 (#82004209)	Lake Ave. 47°37′21″N 120°00′13″W	Douglas	
44	Nifty Theatre	Nifty Theatre	July 27, 1999 (#99000402)	201 Locust; 47°38′56″N 120°04′11″W	Waterville	
45	Pangborn-Herndon Memorial Site	Pangborn-Herndon Memorial Site	March 16, 1972 (#72001269)	3 mi (4.8 km). NE of East Wenatchee; 47°26′35″N 120°16′45″W	East Wenatchee	
46	Rock Island Railroad Bridge	Rock Island Railroad Bridge	July 30, 1975 (#75001842)	SW of Rock Island over the Columbia River; 47°22′02″N 120°09′09″W	Rock Island	
47	Christian Schmidt House	Christian Schmidt House	December 9, 1994 (#94001432)	391 L NW. 47°40′15″N 120°00′25″W	Waterville	
48	Smith Hospital and Douglas County Press Building	Smith Hospital and Douglas County Press Building	May 11, 1989 (#89000402)	109 N. Chelan; 47°38′54″N 120°04′11″W	Waterville	
49	Southern Columbia Plateau and Okanogan Highlands Site No. 45DO1235	Southern Columbia Plateau and Okanogan Highlands Site No. 45DO1235	January 29, 2021 (#100004630)	Address Restricted	Palisades vicinity	Spiritually Significant Rock Features of the Southern Columbia Plateau and Okanogan Highlands.
50	Southern Columbia Plateau and Okanogan Highlands Site No. 45DO1243	Southern Columbia Plateau and Okanogan Highlands Site No. 45DO1243	March 11, 2022 (#100004638)	Address Restricted	Palisades vicinity	Spiritually Significant Rock Features of the Southern Columbia Plateau and Okanogan Highlands.
51	Southern Columbia Plateau and Okanogan Highlands Site No. 45DO1244	Southern Columbia Plateau and Okanogan Highlands Site No. 45DO1244	March 11, 2022 (#100004639)	Address Restricted	Palisades vicinity	Spiritually Significant Rock Features of the Southern Columbia Plateau and Okanogan Highlands.
52	Southern Columbia Plateau and Okanogan Highlands Site No. 45DO1245	Southern Columbia Plateau and Okanogan Highlands Site No. 45DO1245	March 11, 2022 (#100004640)	Address Restricted	Palisades vicinity	Spiritually Significant Rock Features of the Southern Columbia Plateau and Okanogan Highlands.
53	Waterville Hotel	Waterville Hotel	October 18, 1984 (#84000170)	102 S. Central St. 47°38′49″N 120°04′22″W	Waterville	

== See also ==
- National Register of Historic Places listings in Washington state
- Listings in neighboring counties: Chelan, Grant, Kittitas, Okanogan
- Historic preservation
- History of Washington (state)
- Index of Washington (state)-related articles
