= Nifty =

Nifty may refer to:

- Nifty, nickname of Rick Middleton (born 1953), Canadian retired National Hockey League player
- Mr. Nifty, a neighbour of The Beano comic book character Gordon Bennett
- Nifty Airport, located in Western Australia
- Nifty Copper Mine, located in Western Australia
- Nifty Corporation, a Japanese internet service provider
- Nifty Erotic Stories Archive, an online repository of alternative erotica
- Nifty Fifty (disambiguation), or Nifty 50
- Nifty Magazine, a high fashion magazine
- Nifty Theatre, located in Waterville, Washington, U.S., on the National Register of Historic Places
- Niffty, a character from the adult animated series Hazbin Hotel
- Network for Teaching Entrepreneurship (NFTE), pronounced "Nifty", an international non-profit organization providing training to low-income young people
