= Mansfield Branch (Great Northern Railway) =

Coordinates: 47°35′25″N 120°35′25″W

The Mansfield Branch line, located in Eastern Washington State, Douglas County, was constructed by the Great Northern Railway in 1909, and was completed in just 9 months. Starting from the Columbia River and ending in Mansfield, the 60.62 miles (97.56 km) of track cut through the southern portion of the Moses Coulee, snaked up Douglas Creek and made its way across the vast wheat fields of the Waterville Plateau. The train made scheduled stops at Palisades, Alstown, Douglas, Supplee, Withrow, Touhey and Mansfield to drop off and pick up loaded 40 ft (12 m) boxcars of grain from The Waterville Union Grain Co. (a predecessor of the Central Washington Grain Growers, Inc. (CWGG)).

The line was completed in October 1909 as the Moses Coulee Branch, connecting Mansfield to Wenatchee. From the beginning until about the late 1940s, both freight and passenger service shared the rail, but because of declining sales the passenger train was eventually removed. The Granger unit train still continued to play a major role, but on a lesser scale. The train went from 5 day a week service to down to 2 to 3 days a week service, and eventually to Sunday only in the 1970s and 1980s.

The branch line was rebuilt after the floods of 1938 and 1948. In 1948, the estimated cost of repairs exceeded $1,000,000.00. Several wooden bridge trestles and track had to be repaired in order to keep the train operational. Great Northern Railway's records show that 49 wooden trestles were built along this stretch the track, the most of any branch line in the United States. Also, one wooden tunnel was constructed near the falls at Douglas Creek, and in 2000 the tunnel collapsed from years of neglect. In 2000 both ends were closed up with thousands of cubic yards of soil.

The Mansfield branch was one of the last branch lines in the country to still use boxcars to move wheat. This method, by the early 1980s, was considered obsolete. New covered hoppers by this time were doing all of the grain hauling and the Mansfield Branch Line was too light to carry these cars. This was because the 68-pound-per-yard (34 kg/m) rail could not handle the larger hoppers that Burlington Northern Railroad had in its inventory. This and the increase of truck transportation led to the demise of the line.

The Great Northern Railway built and maintained ownership of the line from 1909 until 1970, when the newly formed Burlington Northern Railroad (BN) was transferred ownership of the line during the merger forming it. On March 2, 1985, the last train made its run closing 76 years of granger railroading history in Douglas County. The last train consisted of two BN EMD GP39-2 locomotives #2730 & #2738, 40 boxcars and one caboose.

As of 2008 the abandoned railroad right of way is a hiking trail.

== Maps and pictures ==
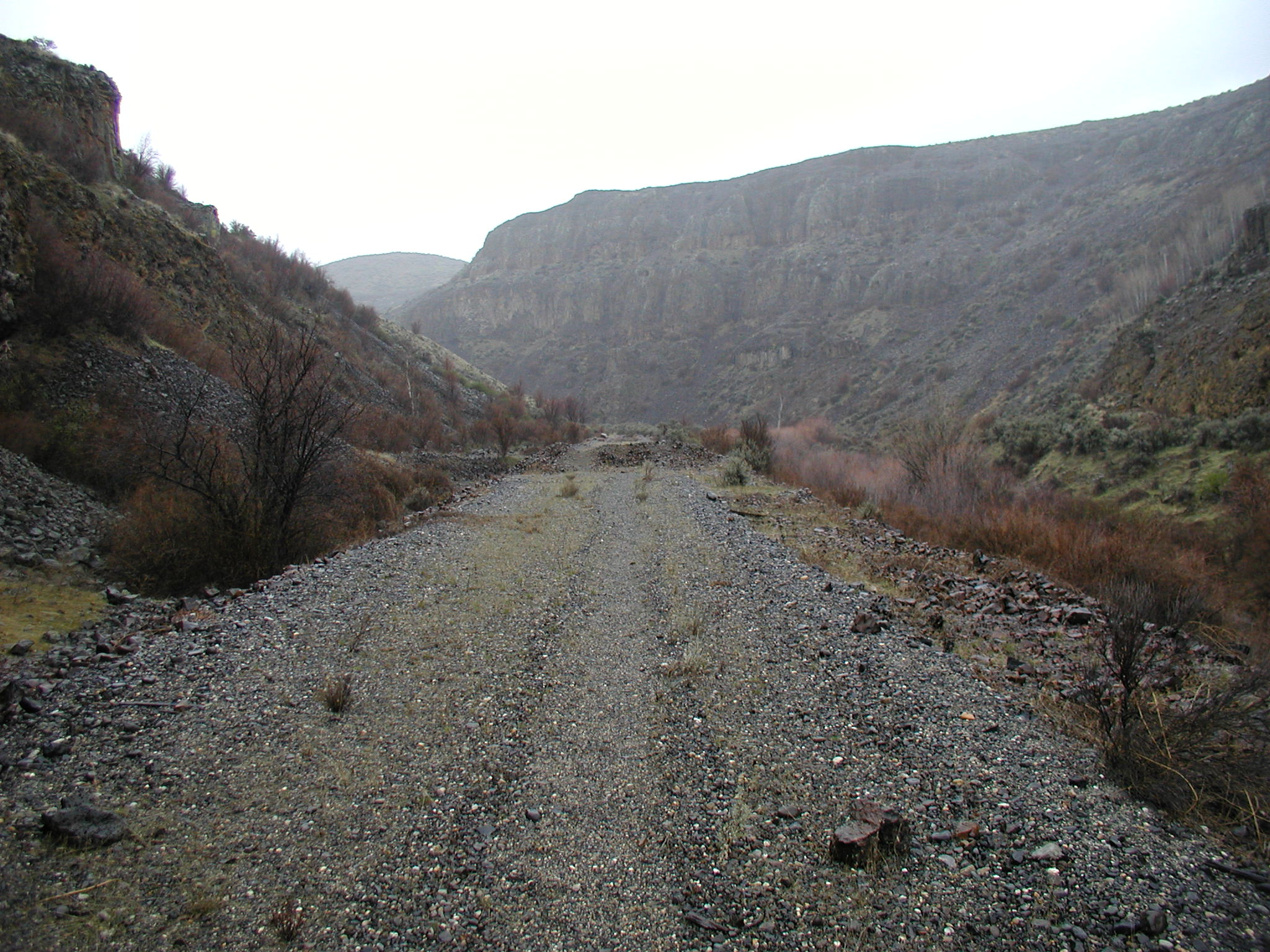
Old railroad bed in the heart of Douglas Creek. 2006 photo

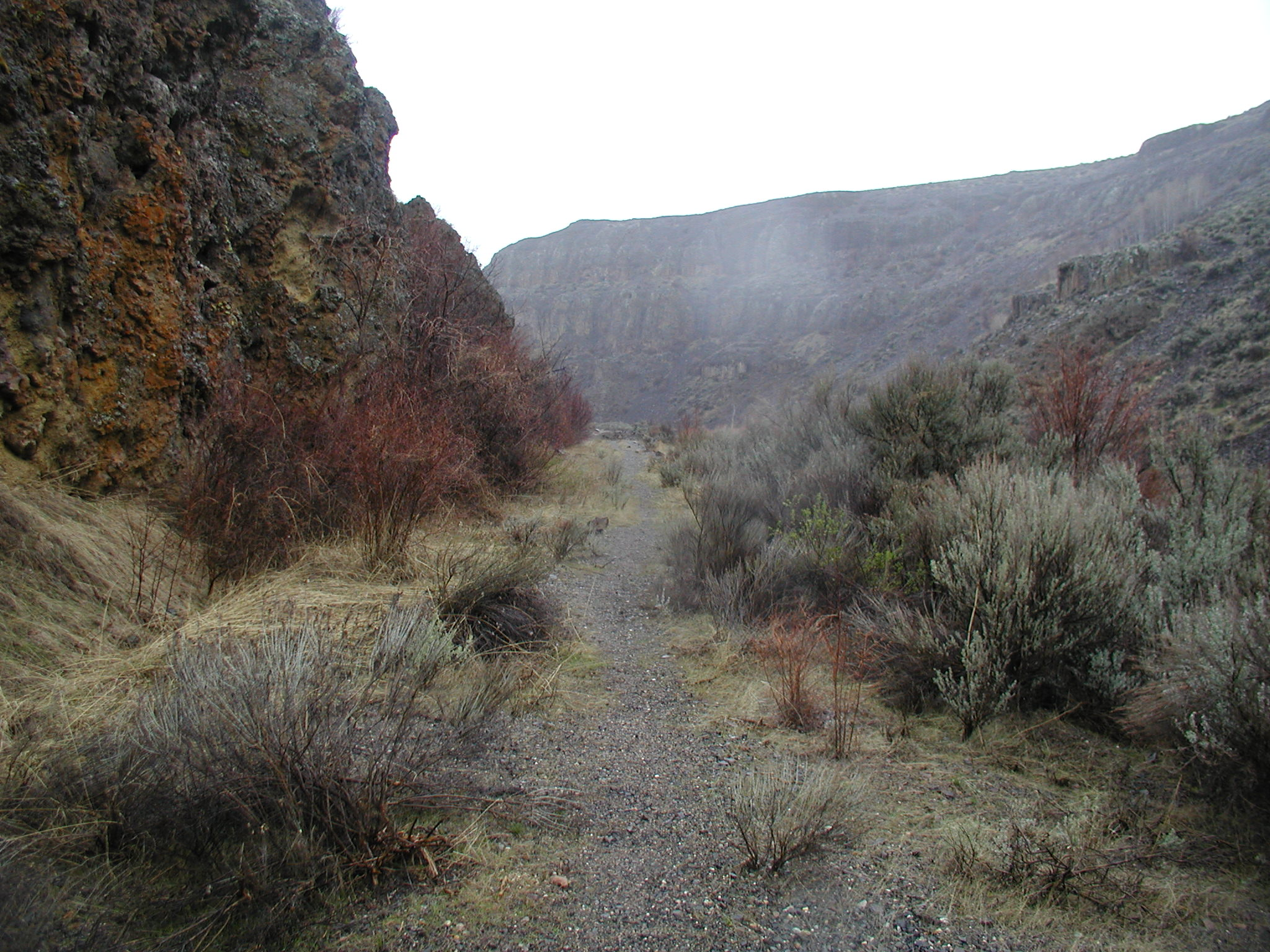
Old railroad bed and large rock cut where the train used to travel. 2006 photo

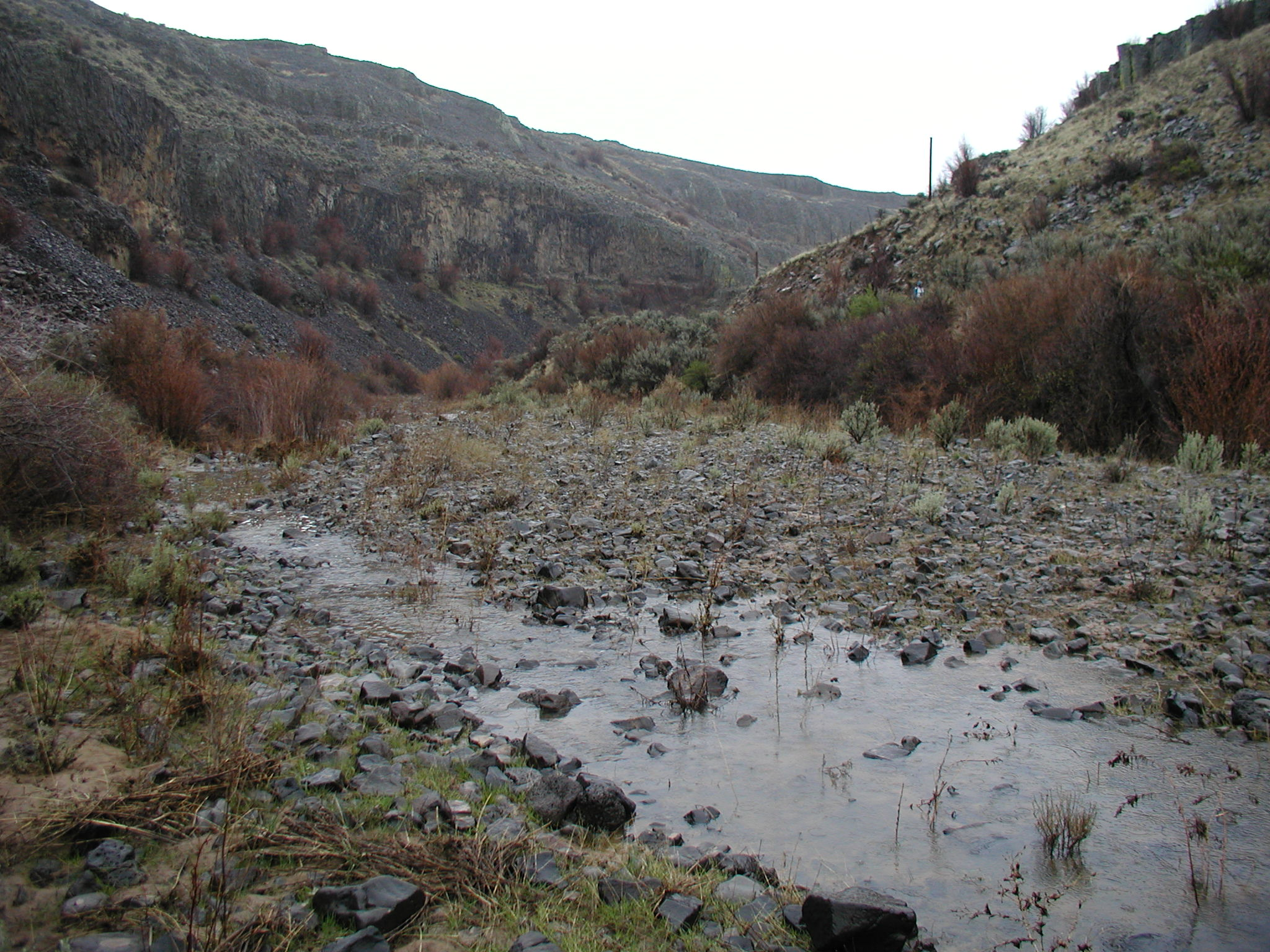
Location of bridge #24 along the Mansfield Branch. Only a retaining wall remains today. 2006 photo

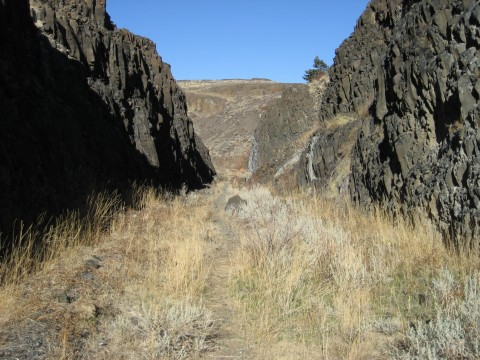
Large rock cut the Great Northern Railway crews had to make in 1909. 2007 photo

== Small towns and stations along the tracks ==
Appledale, Washington

- Palisades, Washington
- McCue siding, Douglas Creek, Washington
- Alstown, Washington
- Douglas, Washington
- Waterville, Washington
- Supplee, Washington
- Withrow, Washington
- Touhey, Washington
- Mansfield, Washington
