= Lamoine, Washington =

Unincorporated community in Washington, United States

- Unincorporated community
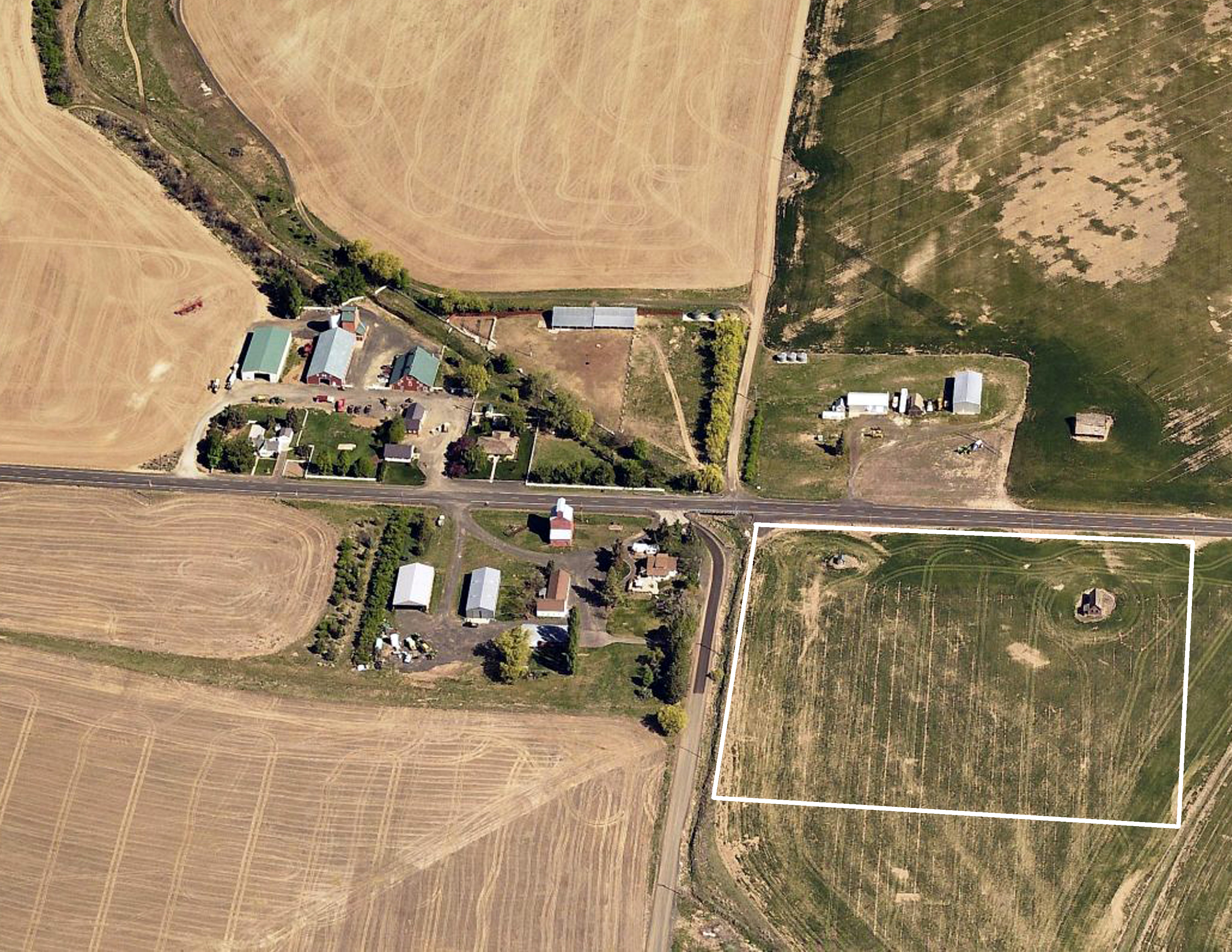
- 2016 aerial photo of Lamoine. White square in bottom right corner represents original town site of Arup. Lamoine schoolhouse is visible in upper right corner of square.

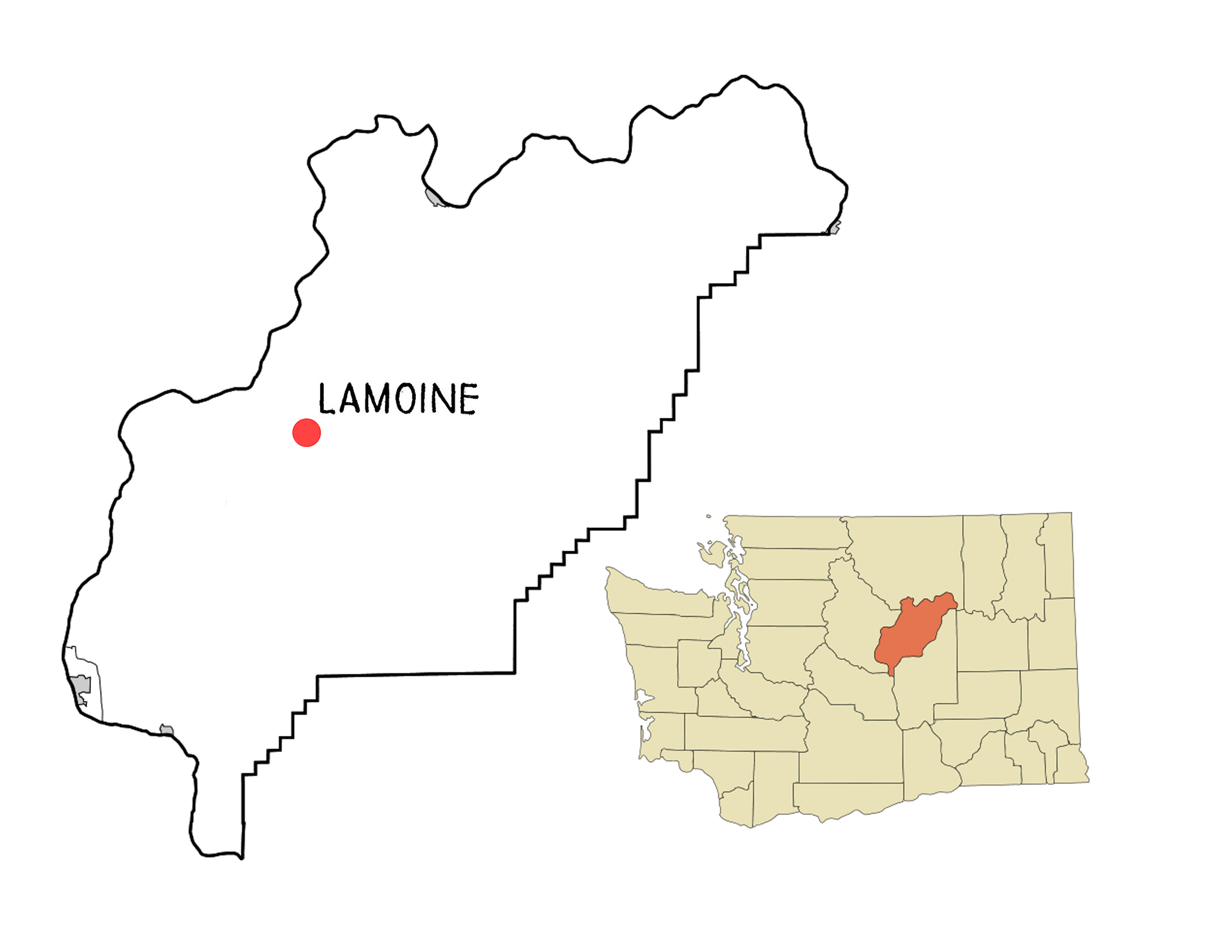
- Lamoine, Washington
- Coordinates: 47°43′44″N 119°53′54″W
- Country: United States
- State: Washington
- County: Douglas
- Elevation: 2,671 ft (814 m)

Population
  - Estimate (2016): 8
- Time zone: Pacific (PST)
- ZIP code: 98858
- Area code: 509
- GNIS feature ID: 1521879

Lamoine is an unincorporated community in Douglas County, in the U.S. state of Washington. Lamoine is located 13 miles (21 km) northeast of Waterville on Road 8 NW.

== History ==
Before Lamoine received its name, the town of Arup, Washington, was platted and filed on Nov. 20, 1905, by the immigrant farmer Nels P. Nelson (1861–1935). On January 3, 1906, the formation of the Town Site Arup was approved by the Board of County Commissioners of Douglas County, Washington. Arup was named after Aarup (spelled with two As), a town near Skydebjerg, Denmark, where he was born. Nelson was anticipating the railroad's running through the newly formed Arup, but in 1909 the Great Northern Railway bypassed it and went through Withrow instead. That sealed the town's fate, and like many upstart towns during the early 1900s, Arup was never around long enough to build a future. Sometime between 1906 and 1909, the name of Arup disappears from records, and the name Lamoine starts being used. Why the name Arup was not kept is unclear.

The story of Lamoine's receiving its name was written and posted in the Withrow Banner by the paper's publisher, W. H. Murray:

It was originally called "Arup." When a postoffice was being secured, a permanent name was under discussion in a small store. A man named Bragg [Leonard Nathan Bragg, who ran the store at the time] reached to the shelf and took down a can of sardines labelled "Lamoine," asking: "What is the matter with that as a name for the town?" The suggestion was approved.

Lamoine once featured a school, a church, a post office, a dance hall, a hardware store, a blacksmith shop, feed store, and even a baseball team. The post office of Lamoine was established in 1906 and remained in operation until 1910.

Some of the original family names that homestead this area during the late 1800s were Lanphere, Jensen, Cunningham, Preugschat, Nelson, Schmidt, Fletcher, and Moore.
