= Badger Mountain Ski Area =

Ski area in Washington, United States

- Location in Washington Badger Mountain Ski Area (the United States)
- Location: Douglas County, Washington, USA
- Nearest major city: Waterville
- Coordinates: 47.61273°N 120.12978°W
- Top elevation: 3,470 ft (1,060 m)
- Base elevation: 3,145 ft (959 m)
- Skiable area: 10 acres (40,000 m^{2})
- Trails: 5-7? -31% easiest -19% more difficult -15% mixed difficulty -35% most difficult
- Longest run: 1,700 ft (520 m)
- Lift system: 1 T-bar, 2 rope tows
- Snowfall: 10 ft (3.0 m)
- Website: Badger Mountain

Badger Mountain Ski Area is a small ski area, 4 miles SW of Waterville, Washington. It is located on the northeastern flank of Badger Mountain. Established in 1939, it is currently a volunteer-run ski area sponsored by the local Waterville Lions Club. The ski area has one Dopplemayr T-bar, two rope tows, and offers sledding. The resort has a relatively low elevation of 3,145 ft (959 m); therefore, the ski area does not usually receive adequate snow until January. The ski area has one small lodge with a kitchen and fireplace. Badger Mt. advertises the "Lowest Priced Lift Ticket in North America" ($15 as of January 2025).
