= Smith Hospital and Douglas County Press Building =

- U.S. National Register of Historic Places
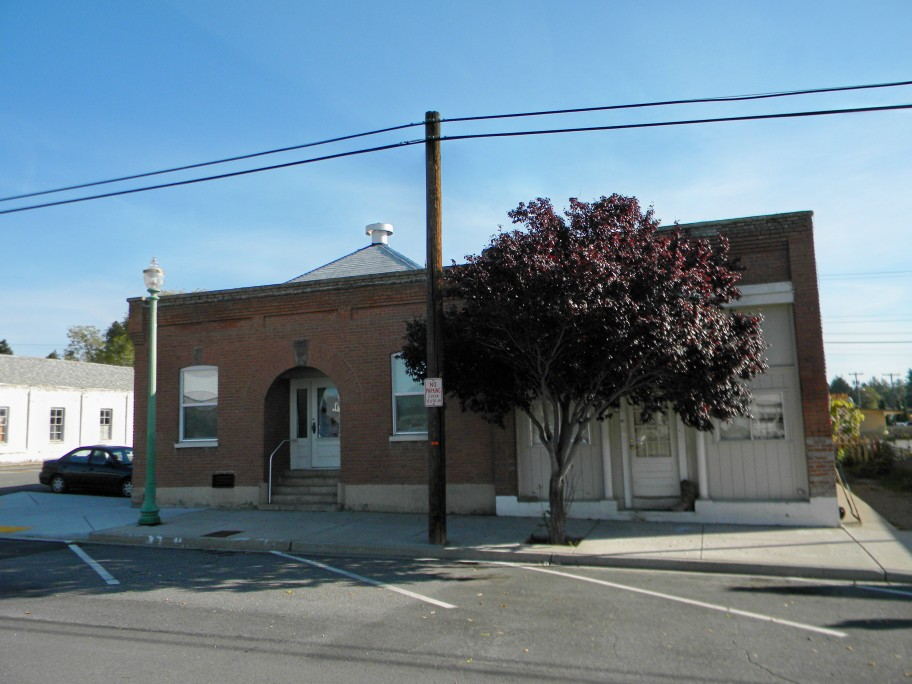
- Smith Hospital and Douglas County Press Building

- Location within Washington (state)
- Location: 109 N. Chelan Avenue, Waterville, Washington
- Coordinates: 47°38′54″N 120°04′11″W
- Area: less than one acre
- Built by: Calhoun & Bell
- NRHP reference No.: 89000402
- Added to NRHP: May 11, 1989

The Smith Hospital and Douglas County Press Building is a historic landmark in Waterville, Washington, United States. It was constructed in 1913 and is associated with the medical and publishing history of Waterville and Douglas County. The building was divided between a regional private hospital for a radius of about fifty miles and an office for one of the county's two leading newspapers. After World War II, the structure was converted into apartments, yet it remains little changed, retaining a historic association with the community.

== History ==
In 1913, Dr. J.F. Leslie, a Waterville physician, purchased a corner lot for a hospital. It was just north of the central business district. Using bricks from the Waterville brickyard of Frank Malfa, John Calhoun built the Smith Hospital and the Douglas County Press. Dr. Leslie was born in Kentucky in 1871, attended medical schools in Kentucky and Ohio. In 1903 he moved to Waterville, and built up a large practice. During his lifetime, he served two-terms as Douglas County health officer, physician, and coroner. The new hospital was the most modern in the region, with offices, treatment rooms, an infirmary, and modern equipment. The new building was the first private hospital in the area. At this time Waterville doctors normally worked from offices above downtown stores or from their homes. Shortly after moving into the building (November 1913), Dr. Leslie died in an automobile accident making a house call to a patient 13 miles (21 km) from Waterville.

Before the end of December, Dr. Henry Ashley Smith moved to Waterville, and purchased the new facility He established his own practice as a physician and surgeon. Dr. Smith was born in Tennessee in 1868, attended Tennessee Medical College in 1892. He had practiced medicine in Tennessee for nearly 20 years. He had been City Physician of Knoxville for six years. In 1912, Smith came to Washington as the principal physician and surgeon for the Northern Pacific Railroad’s in central Washington division. He maintained a residence and private practice in Chelan. In Waterville, Smith was assisted in his practice by his wife and daughter, who both served as nurses. Smith's Waterville practice was successful. He had a reputation for treating the indigent and disadvantaged along with many local families. In 1916, Smith announced plans to expand the facility, to meet local needs, nearly tripling its size. Calhoun and Bell, the original builders, completed the annex containing operating rooms, offices, and the latest technology, valued at over $12,000.

Dr. Smith's career in Waterville, came abruptly to an end in 1918. Despondent over his daughter's death. He was drinking a lot. He became engaged in an altercation with Thomas Burk during an illegal card game. Leaving the game, Smith went to his office, obtained a gun and found Burk in an alley. Shooting Burn, he then beat the man. Dr. J.A. Adams another local physician, heard gunfire outside his window and went to the injured man's assistance. Dr. Adams ordered Dr. Smith to drop the gun. Dr. Smith fired at Dr. Adams, missing. Dr. Adams drew his own gun and shot Dr. Smith in the leg. Burk died of his wounds, while Dr. Smith was taken to his hospital for treatment. Days later, the coroner's jury charged him with murder. Dr. Smith ingested bichloride of mercury tablets and slashed his throat. He died in his office. A succession of Waterville doctors operated the site as a private hospital until after World War Two.

The newspaper in Waterville predates the city's incorporation in 1902 by 14 years. In 1888, L.E. Kellogg began printing the community's first paper, the ‘’Big Bend Empire’’. The newspaper was successful and absorbed most of its competitors through the late 19th century. In 1902, ‘’The Douglas County Press’’, was established by Messrs. Trimble and Jacobson. The Press was created to provide a Democrat mouthpiece in the county. The next year, Ben Spears bought the paper and remained editor and publisher for the next 18 years. In 1913, Spears purchased the lot on Chelan Street adjacent to the hospital site. Using the same contractor, he constructed offices and a print shop. In 1921, Spears sold the paper to Mr. and Mrs. Joe Stoddard. Stoddard was the publisher of the Big Bend Empire, and the two papers were consolidated into the ‘’Empire-Press’’. The Stoddards published the Empire-Press until 1936, when the paper was sold to George Hamilton. The newspaper continued under another publishers, Mr. and Mrs. Glen Stinson (1943), until it was sold to Howard Ordway (1952). The building was then converted to apartments.

== Description ==
The Smith Hospital and Douglas County Press Building is a one story, three-part brick commercial complex located one-half block north of the Downtown Waterville Historic District. The building is located at the southeast intersection of Chelan and Ash streets. The structure is composed of three discrete but interconnected elements: the newspaper office building (the adjacent doctor's office (on the corner), both constructed in 1913, and the hospital annex built east of the original along Ash Street in 1916. All three elements are constructed of local red brick and are mostly well preserved.

The Smith Hospital, at the corner of Chelan and Ash, measures 30 feet (9.1 m) square. It has red brick walls, a concrete foundation, and a hip roof. The front or west facade has two segmentally arched windows to either side of a recessed entrance. The windows are wood frames and surmounted by brick arches with key stones. The entrance between the windows, is set in a round arched opening, with brick voussoirs and a keystone inscribed with "1913". The door has a single glazed panel, flanked by sidelights. The facade on Ash Street has two segmentally arched windows with a single leaf rear door toward the east end of the building. The hospital has a projecting corbelled brick cornice and parapet. The interior contains five rooms off a central hall.

The Douglas County Press Building is to the south of the hospital and shares a party. The newspaper office is 21 feet (6.4 m) wide and 60 feet (18 m) on the sides. It is built of bricks on a concrete foundation. The storefront is a single panel, framed by projecting brick piers and a corbelled brick cornice and parapet. The storefront is composed of a metal cornice and posts, divided into two display windows. They flank the central entry with transoms and kickplates. The parapet is stepped down along the side elevation, with the pitch roof behind. The interior retains the original plan of a small front office in the front and a large area in the back which housed the printing presses.

The Smith Hospital Annex is located on Ash Street behind the original hospital. The link with the original hospital is a frame structure. The annex is a brick structure on a concrete foundation. It measures 92 feet (28 m) on the Ash Street side and 30 feet (9.1 m) on the rear elevation. Regularly spaced segmental arched windows provide natural light. The windows are crowned by arched brick hoods. It has a corbelled brick cornice matching the Hospital. The interior of the annex included 15 rooms with offices and an operating room. Since since it was converted to apartments circa 1952.

== Bibliography ==
- "New Building Going Up," Big Bend Empire, July 31, 1913.
- "Another Brick Building for Waterville," Waterville Empire, October 16, 1913.
- "Dr. J.F. Leslie Killed by Auto," Waterville Empire, November 27, 1913.
- "Dr. Henry A. Smith Locates Here," Waterville Empire, December 4, 1913.
- "Waterville to Have Hospital," Douglas County Press. March 8, 1916.
- "Dr. H.A. Smith Commits Suicide," Douglas County Press, February 7, 1918.
- "Fatal Shooting Sunday Morning," Douglas County Press, January 31, 1918.
- "Big Bend In the Good Old Days," Waterville Empire-Press, December 18, 1958.
