= Eastmont High School =

Coordinates: 47°24′40″N 120°16′21″W

Location
- 955 3rd St NE; East Wenatchee, Washington 98802; United States

Information
- Type: Public
- Established: 1956
- Status: Open
- School district: Eastmont School District
- Principal: Del Enders
- Athletic Director: Russ Waterman
- Teaching staff: 67.50 (FTE)
- Grades: 10-12
- Enrollment: 1,534 (2024–2025)
- Student to teacher ratio: 22.73
- Campus type: Open
- Colors: Bright red, and Columbia blue
- Fight song: "Here's to EHS"
- Athletics: 22 varsity teams
- Athletics conference: Columbia Basin Big Nine 4A
- Mascot: Wildcat
- Rivals: Wenatchee High School Moses Lake High School
- Newspaper: The Scratching Post
- Yearbook: EHS Annual
- Website: Eastmont High School

Eastmont High School, locally referred to as Eastmont or EHS, is a three-year public high school located in East Wenatchee, Washington, USA. The school has 1,457 students in grades 10-12.

The school mascot is the Wildcat. The school colors are Bright red and Columbia blue.

== Athletics ==
Eastmont High School offers a variety of sports, clubs, and activities for students to participate in throughout the school year. Sports offered include:

Fall: cross country, football, volleyball, girls' soccer, girls' swimming, girls’ slow pitch softball
Winter: basketball, wrestling, girls' bowling, boys' swimming
Spring: baseball, girls’ fast pitch softball, track, golf, boys' soccer, tennis

== Other activities ==
- Future Farmers of America (FFA) is for students interested in agricultural studies.
- Cheerleading is for students interested in cheering and stunts.
- Student Council is for students interested in learning leadership skills while working with the school administration.
- Various bands and choirs
