= Wenatchee–East Wenatchee metropolitan area =

Wenatchee Metropolitan Area
- Metropolitan Statistical Area
- Wenatchee–East Wenatchee; Metropolitan Statistical Area
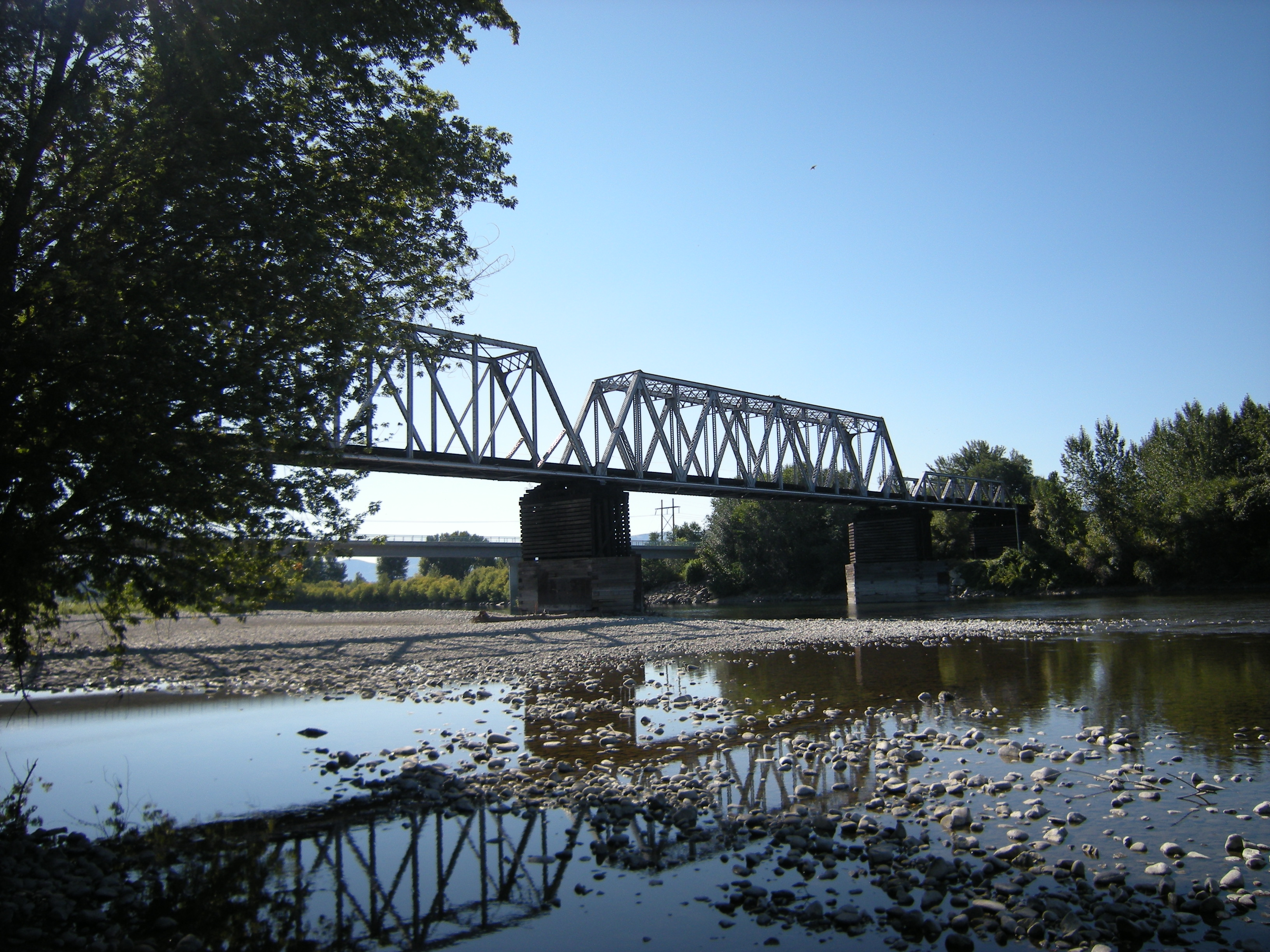
- The Wenatchee River, just before flowing into the Columbia
- Map of Wenatchee–East Wenatchee, WA MSA City of Wenatchee City of East Wenatchee Wenatchee–East Wenatchee, WA MSA
- Coordinates: 47°49′07″N 120°15′56″W
- Country: United States
- State: Washington
- Largest city: Wenatchee (33,636)
- Other cities: East Wenatchee (13,659); Chelan (4,060); Waterville (1,138)

Area
  - Total: 4,739.8 sq mi (12,276 km^{2})
- Highest elevation: 9,511 ft (2,899 m)

Population
  - Total: 116,178
  - Rank: 331st in the U.S.
  - Density: 23/sq mi (9/km^{2})
- Time zone: UTC-8 (PST)
  - Summer (DST): UTC-7 (PDT)

The Wenatchee–East Wenatchee Metropolitan Statistical Area, as defined by the United States Census Bureau, is an area consisting of Chelan and Douglas Counties in Washington state, anchored by the cities of Wenatchee and East Wenatchee. According to the 2000 census the MSA had a population of 99,219. The 2010 census showed the MSA had a population increase of 11.76% to 110,884. As of 2015, the Wenatchee Metropolitan Statistical Area was the 331st largest MSA in the United States.

== Counties ==
- Chelan
- Douglas

== Communities ==
- Places with more than 25,000 inhabitants
  - Wenatchee (Principal city)
- Places with 10,000 to 25,000 inhabitants
  - East Wenatchee (Principal city)
- Places with 1,000 to 10,000 inhabitants
  - Bridgeport
  - Cashmere
  - Chelan
  - Coulee Dam (partial)
  - Leavenworth
  - South Wenatchee (census-designated place)
  - Sunnyslope (census-designated place)
  - Waterville
- Places with less than 1,000 inhabitants
  - Entiat
  - Mansfield
  - Rock Island
- Unincorporated places
  - Blewett
  - Holden Village
  - Manson
  - Stehekin
  - Orondo

=== Racial and ethnic composition ===
Wenatchee–East Wenatchee metropolitan area – Racial and ethnic composition Note: the US Census treats Hispanic/Latino as an ethnic category. This table excludes Latinos from the racial categories and assigns them to a separate category. Hispanics/Latinos may be of any race.
Race / Ethnicity (NH = Non-Hispanic)	Pop 2020	% 2020
White alone (NH)	77,538	63.54%
Black or African American alone (NH)	370	0.30%
Native American or Alaska Native alone (NH)	746	0.61%
Asian alone (NH)	1,193	0.98%
Native Hawaiian or Pacific Islander alone (NH)	164	0.13%
Other race alone (NH)	584	0.48%
Mixed race or Multiracial (NH)	4,676	3.83%
Hispanic or Latino (any race)	36,741	30.11%
Total	122,012	100.00%

As of the 2000 census, there were 99,219 people, 36,747 households, and 26,240 families residing within the MSA. The racial makeup of the MSA was 83.97% White, 0.28% African American, 1.02% Native American, 0.63% Asian, 0.11% Pacific Islander, 11.74% from other races, and 2.25% from two or more races. Hispanic or Latino of any race were 19.42% of the population.

The median income for a household in the MSA was $37,890, and the median income for a family was $45,035. Males had a median income of $35,491 versus $25,316 for females. The per capita income for the MSA was $18,211.

== See also ==
- Washington census statistical areas
