= Badger Mountain (Douglas County, Washington) =

Mountain in Washington (state), United States

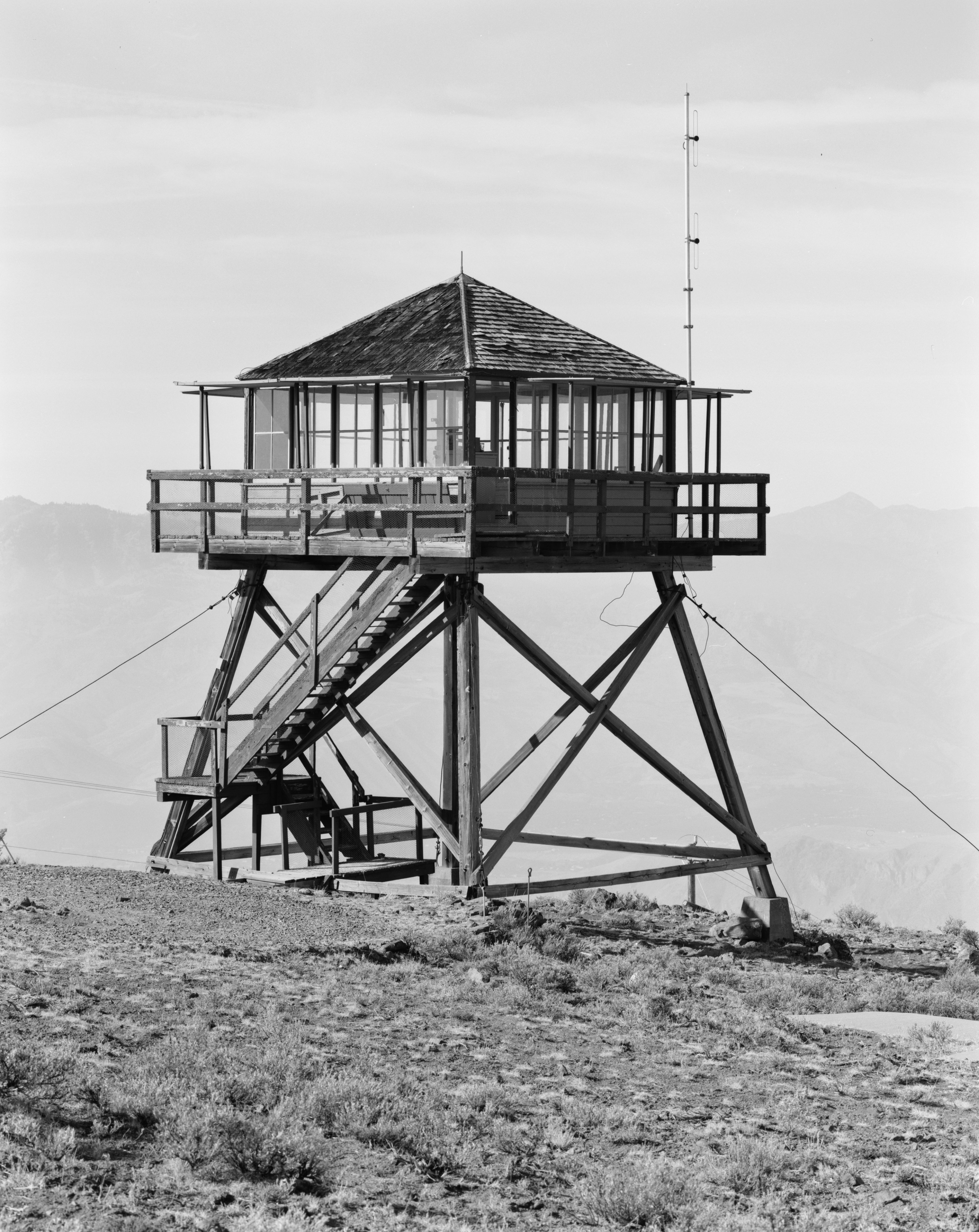
- Fire lookout on top of Badger Mountain

Highest point
- Elevation: 4,262 ft (1,299 m) NAVD 88
- Prominence: 2,674 ft (815 m)
- Listing: Mountains of Washington (state)
- Coordinates: 47°35′02″N 120°10′46″W

Geography
- Location within Washington (state)
- Location: Douglas County, Washington, U.S.
- Parent range: Columbia River Plateau
- Topo map: USGS Orondo

Badger Mountain is a mountain in Douglas County in the U.S. state of Washington. It is the highest point in Douglas County, and is located east of the Columbia River and northeast of Wenatchee. Badger Mountain is part of the Columbia Plateau.

The Badger Mountain Ski Area is located on the mountain's northeastern flank.

According to Edmond S. Meany, a Mt. St. Pierre named by Lt. Johnson of the United States Exploring Expedition in 1841 was probably Badger Mountain. Its present name goes back to settlers and refers to the native animal, the badger.

In 2026, plans for a solar development proposed for Badger Mountain were withdrawn after controversy that it impinged on traditional sacred land and indigenous tribal uses of Badger Mountain.
