= South Wenatchee, Washington =

- Census-designated place
- Location of South Wenatchee, Washington
- Coordinates: 47°22′45″N 120°16′57″W
- Country: United States
- State: Washington
- County: Chelan

Area
  - Total: 1.5 sq mi (4.0 km^{2})
  - Land: 1.2 sq mi (3.0 km^{2})
  - Water: 0.39 sq mi (1.0 km^{2})
- Elevation: 623 ft (190 m)

Population (2020)
  - Total: 1,522
  - Density: 1,319/sq mi (509.3/km^{2})
- Time zone: UTC-8 (Pacific (PST))
  - Summer (DST): UTC-7 (PDT)
- ZIP code: 98801
- Area code: 509
- FIPS code: 53-66185
- GNIS feature ID: 2408777

South Wenatchee is an unincorporated community and census-designated place (CDP) in Chelan County, Washington, United States. It is part of the Wenatchee–East Wenatchee Metropolitan Statistical Area. The population was 1,522 at the 2020 census.

== Geography ==
South Wenatchee is bordered to the northwest by the city of Wenatchee and to the northeast by the Columbia River.

According to the United States Census Bureau, the CDP has a total area of 1.5 square miles (4.0 km^{2}), of which 1.2 square miles (3.0 km^{2}) is land and 0.39 square miles (1.0 km^{2}), or 23.85%, is water.

== Demographics ==
Historical population
Census	Pop.	Note	%±
1980	1,376		—
1990	1,207		−12.3%
2000	1,991		65.0%
2010	1,553		−22.0%
2020	1,522		−2.0%
U.S. Decennial Census; 1970 1980 1990; 2000 2010

=== 2020 census ===
As of the 2020 census, South Wenatchee had a population of 1,522 people, with 463 households and 339 families. The population density was 1,302.0 per square mile (502.7/km^{2}). There were 482 housing units at an average density of 412.3 per square mile (159.2/km^{2}).

The median age was 31.0 years. 29.9% of residents were under the age of 18, 11.8% were from 18 to 24, 26.5% were from 25 to 44, 22.8% were from 45 to 64, and 8.9% were 65 years of age or older. For every 100 females there were 100.3 males, and for every 100 females age 18 and over there were 97.2 males age 18 and over. 92.7% of residents lived in urban areas, while 7.3% lived in rural areas.

Of the 463 households, 44.5% had children under the age of 18 living in them. Of all households, 48.4% were married-couple households, 16.6% were households with a male householder and no spouse or partner present, and 24.2% were households with a female householder and no spouse or partner present. About 17.7% of all households were made up of individuals, and 6.0% had someone living alone who was 65 years of age or older. The average household size was 3.0 and the average family size was 3.8.

There were 482 housing units, of which 3.9% were vacant. The homeowner vacancy rate was 2.1% and the rental vacancy rate was 1.6%.

Racial composition as of the 2020 census
Race	Number	Percent
White	577	37.9%
Black or African American	1	0.1%
American Indian and Alaska Native	21	1.4%
Asian	6	0.4%
Native Hawaiian and Other Pacific Islander	3	0.2%
Some other race	641	42.1%
Two or more races	273	17.9%
Hispanic or Latino (of any race)	1,024	67.3%

=== Educational attainment ===
The percent of those with a bachelor's degree or higher was estimated to be 6.3% of the population.

=== 2000 census ===
As of the census of 2000, there were 1,991 people, 620 households, and 450 families residing in the CDP. The population density was 1,097.5 people per square mile (424.7/km^{2}). There were 665 housing units at an average density of 366.6/sq mi (141.9/km^{2}). The racial makeup of the CDP was 67.70% White, 0.25% African American, 1.81% Native American, 0.35% Asian, 0.05% Pacific Islander, 27.47% from other races, and 2.36% from two or more races. Hispanic or Latino of any race were 36.06% of the population.

There were 620 households, out of which 46.6% had children under the age of 18 living with them, 50.6% were married couples living together, 16.0% had a female householder with no husband present, and 27.4% were non-families. 21.3% of all households were made up of individuals, and 7.9% had someone living alone who was 65 years of age or older. The average household size was 3.15 and the average family size was 3.64.

In the CDP, the age distribution of the population shows 33.8% under the age of 18, 12.5% from 18 to 24, 28.2% from 25 to 44, 17.9% from 45 to 64, and 7.7% who were 65 years of age or older. The median age was 28 years. For every 100 females, there were 110.2 males. For every 100 females age 18 and over, there were 110.2 males.

The median income for a household in the CDP was $29,741, and the median income for a family was $31,417. Males had a median income of $27,935 versus $27,786 for females. The per capita income for the CDP was $11,613. About 15.5% of families and 19.9% of the population were below the poverty line, including 23.5% of those under age 18 and 10.6% of those age 65 or over.
