= Rock Island Railroad Bridge (Columbia River) =

Bridge in Rock Island, Washington

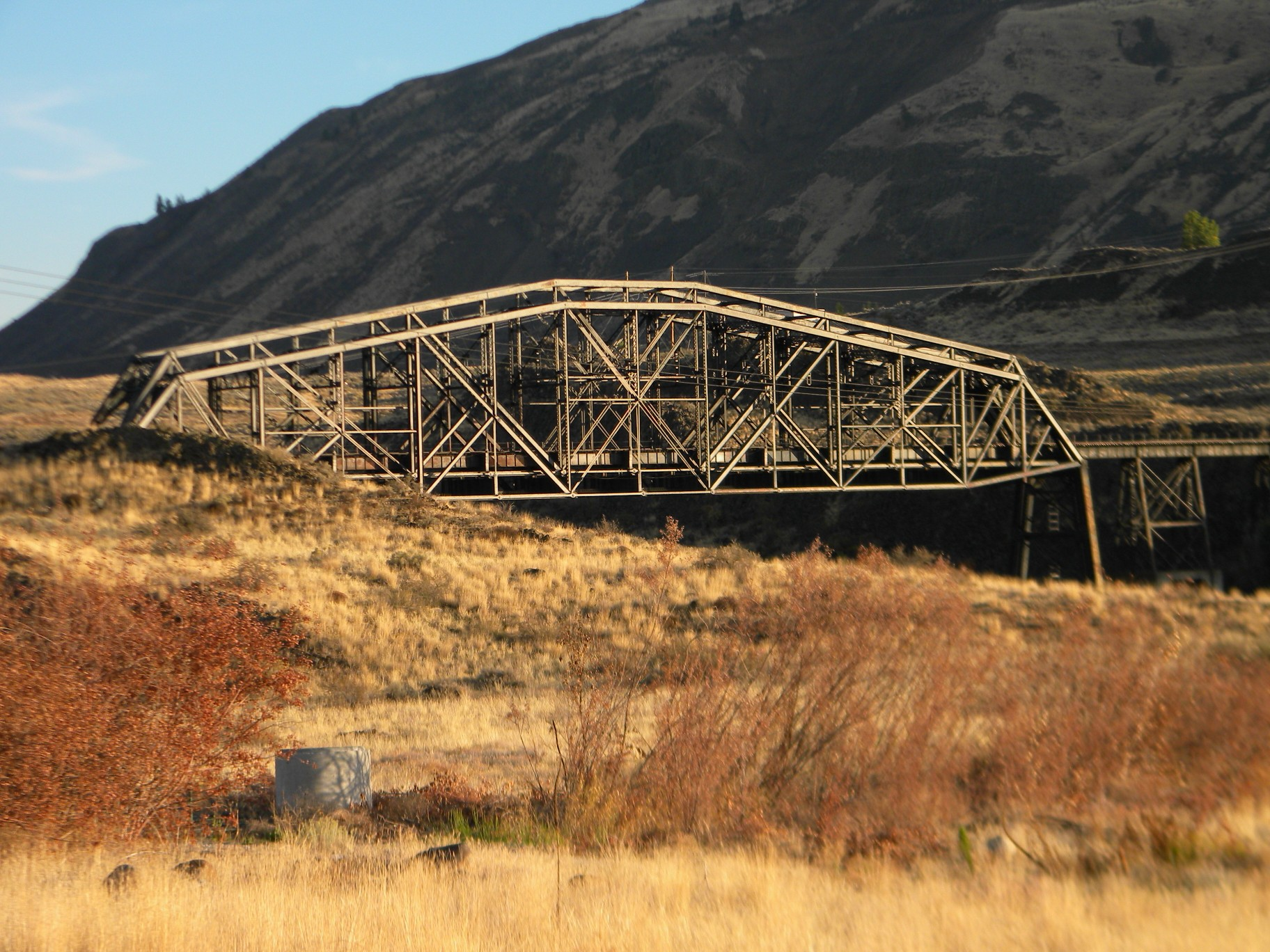
- Coordinates: 47°22′02″N 120°09′07″W
- Carries: 1 railroad track
- Crosses: Columbia River
- Locale: Rock Island, Washington, U.S.
- Maintained by: BNSF Railway

Characteristics
- Design: Truss bridge
- Total length: 875 feet (267 m)
- Longest span: 416.5 feet (127 m)

History
- Opened: 1892

Statistics
- Daily traffic: freight
- Rock Island Railroad Bridge
- U.S. National Register of Historic Places
- Location within Washington (state)
- Location: Spans Columbia River about 0.7 miles (1.1 km) southwest of Rock Island
- Nearest city: Rock Island, Washington
- Coordinates: 47°22′01″N 120°09′14″W
- Area: 1 acre (0.4 ha)
- Built: 1892
- Architect: Edge Moor Bridge Works
- Architectural style: fixed span through truss br.
- MPS: Historic Bridges/Tunnels in Washington State TR (AD)
- NRHP reference No.: 75001842
- Added to NRHP: July 30, 1975

Location
- Interactive map of Rock Island Railroad Bridge

The Rock Island Railroad Bridge is a BNSF Railway bridge across the Columbia River at Rock Island, Washington. The structure consists of one through truss, one deck truss, and an approach trestle.

== History ==
The bridge was originally built in 1892 for the Great Northern Railway. Bridging the Columbia River was an important component in completing Great Northern's transcontinental link the following year. The site was chosen at Rock Island, Washington for being the shortest distance between the banks of the Columbia River in Washington state. In 1925, it was decided to strengthen the main span in anticipation of increased traffic and heavier trains by reinforcing the structure with an additional outside truss frame.
