= Saint Andrews, Washington =

Ghost town in Washington (state)

- Unincorporated community, Ghost town
- Location within Washington (state) Location within the United States
- Coordinates: 47°41′59″N 119°25′35″W
- Country: United States
- State: Washington
- County: Douglas
- Established: 1890
- Elevation: 2,238 ft (682 m)
- Time zone: UTC-8 (Pacific (PST))
  - Summer (DST): UTC-7 (PDT)
- GNIS feature ID: 1511287

Saint Andrews is an unincorporated community in Douglas County, in the U.S. state of Washington.

== History ==
A post office called Saint Andrews was established in 1890, and remained in operation until 1957. James Saint Andrews, an early postmaster, gave the community his name. It exists as a ghost town, one with dilapidated buildings and artifacts.
