= Mansfield, Washington =

Mansfield
- Town
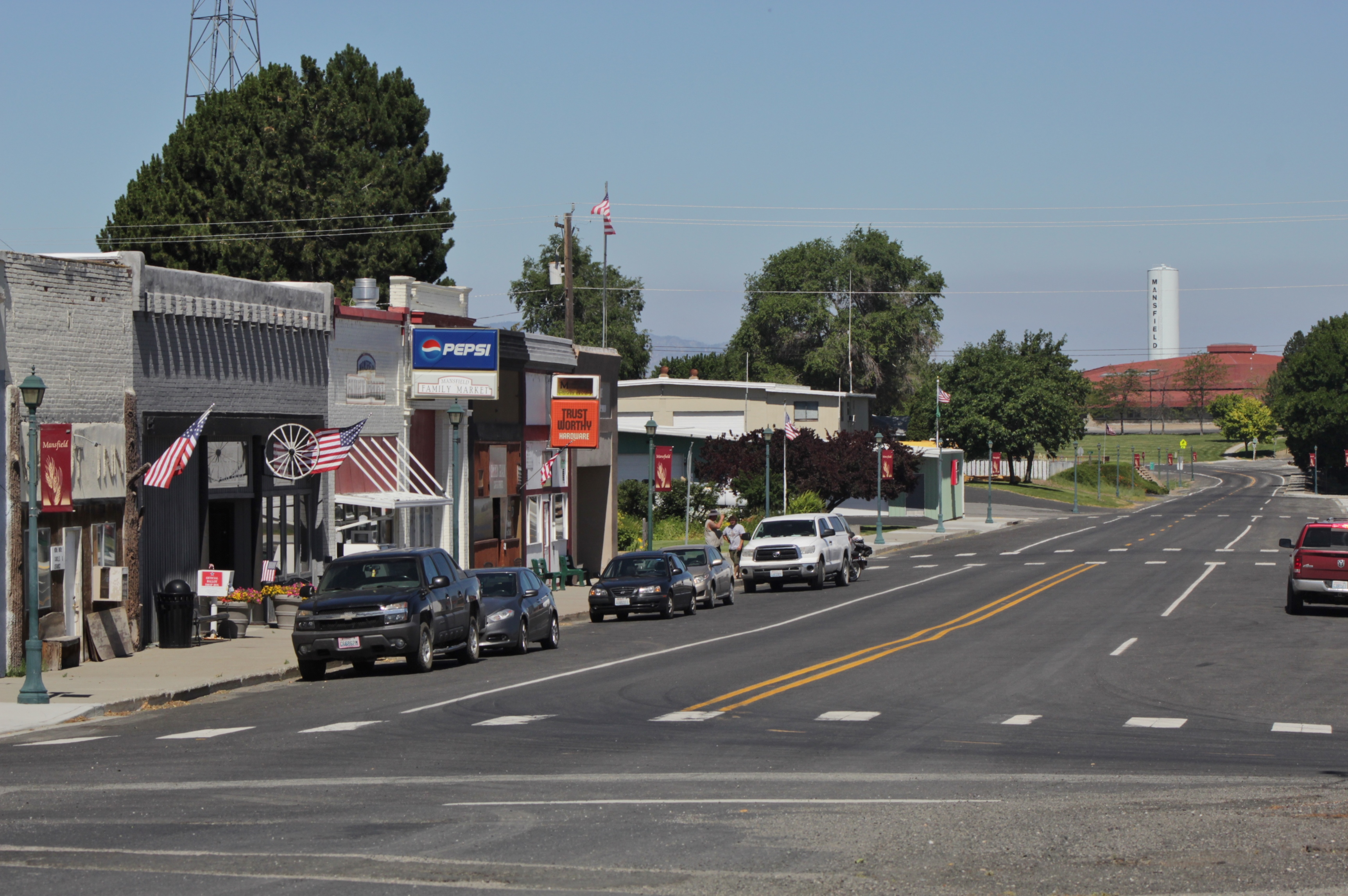
- Main Street in Mansfield

- Location of Mansfield, Washington
- Coordinates: 47°48′43″N 119°38′17″W
- Country: United States
- State: Washington
- County: Douglas

Government
  - Type: Mayor–council
  - Mayor: Clint Wall

Area
  - Total: 0.32 sq mi (0.84 km^{2})
  - Land: 0.32 sq mi (0.84 km^{2})
  - Water: 0 sq mi (0.00 km^{2})
- Elevation: 2,264 ft (690 m)

Population (2020)
  - Total: 326
  - Density: 1,000/sq mi (390/km^{2})
- Time zone: UTC-8 (Pacific (PST))
  - Summer (DST): UTC-7 (PDT)
- ZIP code: 98830
- Area code: 509
- FIPS code: 53-42800
- GNIS feature ID: 2412946
- Website: townofmansfield.net

Mansfield is a town in Douglas County, Washington, United States. It is part of the Wenatchee–East Wenatchee Metropolitan Statistical Area. The population was 326 at the 2020 census.

== History ==
R.E. Darling named Mansfield in 1905 after his hometown of Mansfield, Ohio. Mansfield's land was purchased and first developed in 1909 by the Great Northern Railway. Mansfield was officially incorporated on February 23, 1911.

=== Fires ===
By 1914, the town had grown substantially, and had acquired two hotels, a bank, a doctor's office, and many more amenities. What had started as a town based on agriculture and the railroad had grown into a popular resort destination.

In June 1914, a fire broke out in Mansfield's Knox Store, known as "Mansfield's greatest store". The fire was pushed by the wind and spread over both sides of the first block of Mansfield's Main Street. The fire caused roughly $200,000 US in damage. In November of the same year, fire destroyed the second block of Main Street. After the fires, a town ordinance was passed requiring all new buildings within certain areas of the town to be built of fire-proof materials.

In 1922, the Cross Hotel, owned by contractor Robert Cross, burned to the ground. The hotel was one of Mansfield's greatest attractions, and was considered to be one of the best hotels in all of North Central Washington. Though his hotel was lost, many of the houses built by Cross are still in use today.

=== The Great Depression ===
Mansfield's economy continued to grow throughout the years leading up to the Great Depression. The town's enormous amount of wheat production proved very lucrative, and the town continued to grow.

In the mid-1920s, a terrible drought hit Mansfield and the surrounding area. That, along with the beginnings of the Great Depression, caused many people to leave Mansfield in search of work.

=== After the Depression and Mansfield today ===
The town's crops and economy eventually recovered, but the damage had been done. Mansfield would never fully return to what it once was. The railroad eventually closed its service depot in Mansfield. In the 1950s, the train station was sold off and moved. Finally, in the 1980s, the railroad departed from Mansfield for the last time. The railroad was no longer able to serve the communities it passed through in Central Washington. The rails were dismantled, leaving Mansfield as "the town at the end of the rails".

Today, Mansfield is still a town based on agriculture. The town's grain elevators process around 1.7 million bushels of wheat annually.

== Geography ==
According to the United States Census Bureau, the town has a total area of 0.31 square miles (0.80 km^{2}), all of it land.

=== Climate ===
According to the Köppen Climate Classification system, Mansfield has a semi-arid climate, abbreviated "BSk" on climate maps.

== Demographics ==
Historical population
Census	Pop.	Note	%±
1920	478		—
1930	230		−51.9%
1940	349		51.7%
1950	414		18.6%
1960	335		−19.1%
1970	273		−18.5%
1980	315		15.4%
1990	311		−1.3%
2000	319		2.6%
2010	320		0.3%
2020	326		1.9%
U.S. Decennial Census; 2015 Estimate

=== 2010 census ===
As of the 2010 census, there were 320 people, 144 households, and 99 families residing in the town. The population density was 1,032.3 inhabitants per square mile (398.6/km^{2}). There were 169 housing units at an average density of 545.2 per square mile (210.5/km^{2}). The racial makeup of the town was 97.5% White, 0.6% Native American, 0.3% Asian, and 1.6% from two or more races. Hispanic or Latino of any race were 4.7% of the population.

There were 144 households, of which 29.9% had children under the age of 18 living with them, 51.4% were married couples living together, 11.1% had a female householder with no husband present, 6.3% had a male householder with no wife present, and 31.3% were non-families. 27.1% of all households were made up of individuals, and 9.8% had someone living alone who was 65 years of age or older. The average household size was 2.22 and the average family size was 2.67.

The median age in the town was 46.4 years. 22.8% of residents were under the age of 18; 7.3% were between the ages of 18 and 24; 18.4% were from 25 to 44; 27.5% were from 45 to 64; and 24.1% were 65 years of age or older. The gender makeup of the town was 48.8% male and 51.3% female.

=== 2000 census ===
As of the 2000 census, there were 319 people, 148 households, and 95 families residing in the town. The population density was 1,026.7 people per square mile (397.3/km^{2}). There were 168 housing units at an average density of 540.7 per square mile (209.2/km^{2}). The racial makeup of the town was 94.04% White, 0.63% Native American, 1.57% from other races, and 3.76% from two or more races. Hispanic or Latino of any race were 3.45% of the population.

There were 148 households, out of which 25.0% had children under the age of 18 living with them, 54.1% were married couples living together, 6.8% had a female householder with no husband present, and 35.8% were non-families. 30.4% of all households were made up of individuals, and 14.9% had someone living alone who was 65 years of age or older. The average household size was 2.16 and the average family size was 2.63.

In the town, the age distribution of the population shows 21.9% under the age of 18, 5.6% from 18 to 24, 24.5% from 25 to 44, 26.0% from 45 to 64, and 21.9% who were 65 years of age or older. The median age was 44 years. For every 100 females, there were 85.5 males. For every 100 females age 18 and over, there were 87.2 males.

The median income for a household in the town was $28,750, and the median income for a family was $42,500. Males had a median income of $38,125 versus $21,667 for females. The per capita income for the town was $17,368. About 13.3% of families and 17.1% of the population were below the poverty line, including 19.7% of those under age 18 and 6.3% of those age 65 or over.

== Education ==
The town is served by the Mansfield School District.

== Recreation ==
Mansfield is well known in hang gliding circles for its favorable summer weather. Mansfield is also home to high-power rocketry launch events from spring to fall. Its close proximity to the Grand Coulee Dam and Lake Chelan allow for aquatic recreation. In Winter, Mansfield's surrounding land provides opportunities for cross country skiers and snowmobilers.
