= Nifty Magazine =

American fashion magazine

Nifty Magazine is a high fashion magazine that focuses on upcoming and aspiring models, fashion, beauty and health. It was first published in May 2007. The magazine is headquartered in New York City. It is published on monthly basis.

== Content ==
NIFTY Magazine's mission is to highlight the hidden information pertaining to the model industry, to show the realism of a model's profession.

== Past cover models ==
Nifty Magazine Issue	Past Cover Model	Most Known For
Winter 2008	Casey Messer	Miss New Mexico USA 2007
Spring 2008	Magali DeLaRosa	Latin Singer
Summer 2008	Jessica Elbaum	Greek Key Stylist
Fall 2008	Kassandra Hermendez	Internet Cover Model
Anniversary Issue 2009	Nicole Bosso	Miss Delaware USA 2007 & UPN Show "Crowned"
Summer/Fall 2009	Deonna Nieves	#1 Sexiest Model Alive for 2009!
Spring/Summer Issue 2010	Ashley Pocklington	Youngest Nifty Magazine Cover Model Ever!
Fall/Winter 2010	Alina Gorun	1st Featured European Model

== Top recognizable models ==
Past Cover Model	Most Known For
Raquel Beezley	Miss California USA, 2008
Jackie Tvrdik	Miss Virginia American Queen, 2008
Barbara Zatler	Playboy's Denmark playmate
Musa Sharon Chauke	Miss South Africa World 2009
Deborah Bernstein	Mrs Florida 2002 and 2008
Amanda Houdashell	Miss Arizona International and Miss Arizona US 2009
Shannen Reil	Miss Kentucky Teen USA 2008 and Miss Kentucky Teen World 2009
Casey Messer	Miss New Mexico USA 2007
Jade Bryce,	Ms. San Antonio 2008
Jessica Elbaum	"Greek" key stylist
Nicole Bosso	Miss Delaware USA 2007
Debbie O' Toole	Miss Hawaiian Tropic
Laura Pucker	Mrs American Queen 2009
Christine Dail	Miss Tawaiian World 2008
Aileen Yap	Miss US International 2009
Suzanne Revell	Actress, Model and Host
Noelle Johnson	I Want to Work for Diddy 2

== See also ==
- List of fashion magazines
