= Waterville School District =

School district in Waterville, Washington

The Waterville School District 209 is a school district headquartered in Waterville, Washington. It operates a single school, the Waterville School, serving grades K-12.

== History ==
The district was established in 1886 as the Waterville School District No. 5. The first classes were held approximately two years later in what is today the public library. The first permanent school building opened in 1889, on property donated by James H. Kincaid. It was painted with white walls and a red roof.

In 2018, the district and its lone school switched to a four-day schedule, with classes held from Monday to Thursday. The decision was made in part due to reduce cost. The switch was made possible by a state law passed in 2009 that allows five school districts in the state to use four-day schedules, of which two serve populations of fewer than 150 enrolled students and three serve populations of 150 to 500 students. The school year was reduced from around 180 days to 150 days.
