= Eastmont School District =

School district in Douglas County, Washington, USA

Eastmont School District is a public school district located in Douglas County, Washington, United States.

== Eastmont Schools ==
Schools in Eastmont School District include:

- Eastmont High School - Grades 10 through 12
- Eastmont Jr. High - Grades 7,8,9
- Sterling Jr. High- Grades 7,8,9
- Clovis Point Elementary
- Kenroy Elementary -
- Grant Elementary -
- Rock Island Elementary -
- Lee Elementary - Grades Transitional Kindergarten through 6th
- Cascade Elementary -

== Eastmont High School ==
- Principal - Lance Noell
- Asst. Principal (Grade 10: A-M) - Jon Abbott
- Asst. Principal (Grade 10: N-Z) - Jim Schmutzler
- Asst. Principal (Grade 11) - Tom McRae
- Asst. Principal (Grade 12) - Stacia Hardie

== Administration ==
Eastmont School District officials include:

School Board as of January 2020:

- Annette Eggers
- Dave Piepel
- Whitney Smith
- Meaghan Vibbert
- Cindy Wright

Other officials as of March 2023:

- Becky Berg - Superintendent
- Spencer Taylor - Executive Director Elementary Ed.
- Matt Charlton - Assistant Superintendent Secondary Ed.
