= Nifty Theatre =

- U.S. National Register of Historic Places
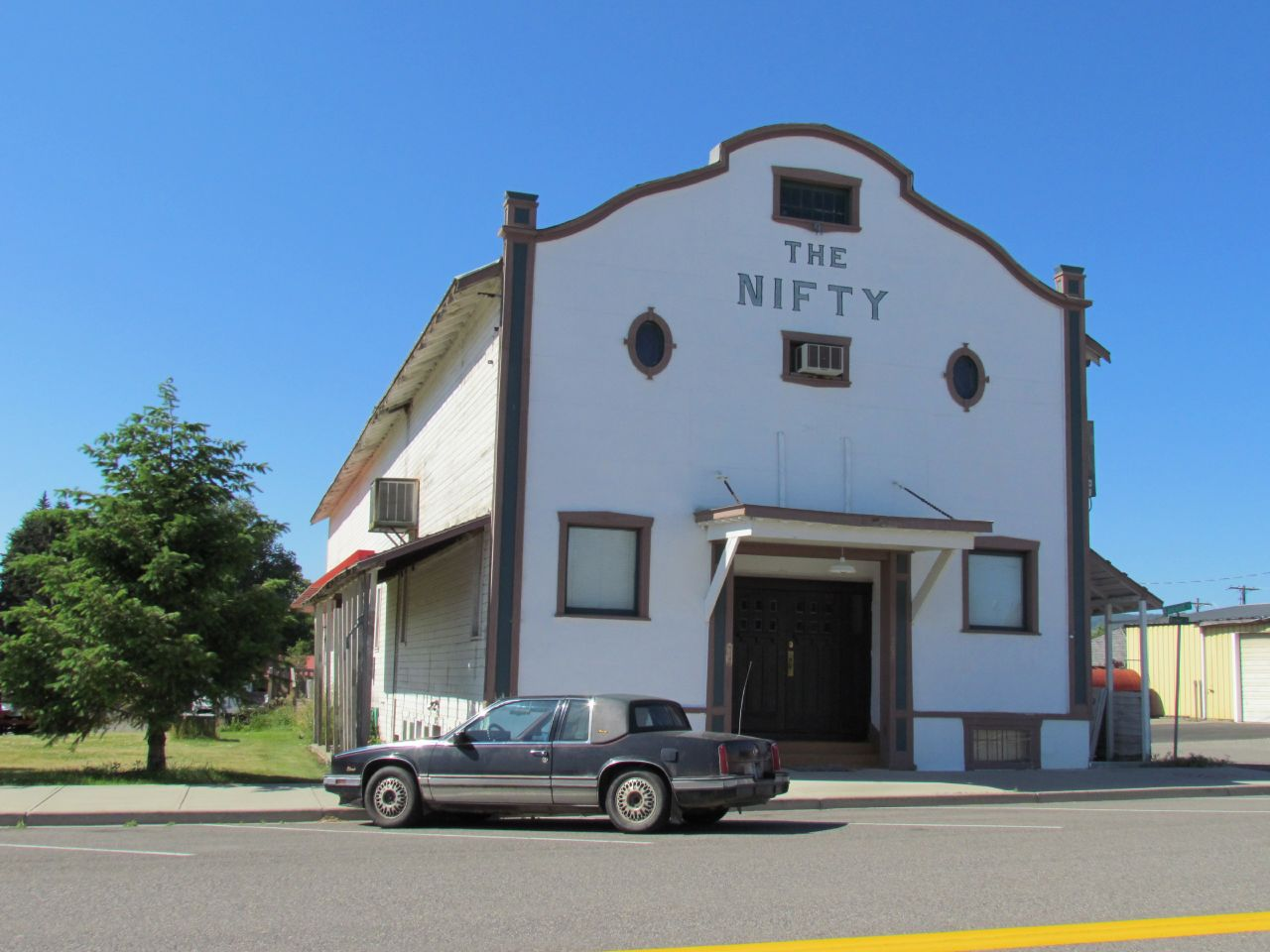
- Theatre in 2011

- Location within Washington (state)
- Location: 201 Locust, Waterville, Washington
- Coordinates: 47°38′56″N 120°4′11″W
- Built: 1919
- Architectural style: Mission/Spanish Revival
- MPS: Movie Theaters in Washington State MPS
- NRHP reference No.: 99000402
- Added to NRHP: July 27, 1999

The Nifty Theatre in Waterville, Washington is a small movie theater. The 1919 frame building features Mission Style detailing, and seats just under 300. The theater ceased operations in 1959 and had been used as a storage building until 1997, when new owners restored the theater for community use.

== History ==
The Nifty Theatre was built in 1918 by W.P. Brown, opening it in 1919 and living in the basement with his wife. The Browns operated the theater until 1959. According to a sale prospectus dated 1946, Brown was a graduate of Washington State University and a wounded military veteran, who had acquired 1,200 acres (490 ha) of land and operated a stable of racehorses on the proceeds from the theater. The theater showed both movies and vaudeville shows, as well as community activities and productions. Brown closed the theater in 1959 due to competition from television and died the next year. Mrs. Brown sold the theater to Claude Case for $1.00, retaining the right to live in the apartment, living there until she died in 1970. Case owned the property until 1997, using the theater for storage for his collections and his construction business, with no alterations.

The theater was acquired by Jim and Jenna Dixon in 1997, who operate the theater as a community theater.

== Description ==
The Nifty Theatre was built as both a nickelodeon movie house and as a vaudeville theater, even though the nickelodeon era was largely past in 1919, when palace-style movie theaters were starting to be built. As Waterville was a small town, the Nifty was a relatively modest theater that with its flat floor partially could serve as a dance hall and as a prize-fighting arena. The freestanding building stands a block away from the Downtown Waterville Historic District. Its main facade is stuccoed with pilasters at the corners and a curved parapet. The side and rear elevations are covered in tongue-and-groove wood siding. The entry is sheltered by a marquee suspended from the front wall. with steps rising to the main entry door. A further set of interior stairs rises to the ticket window, with the lobby beyond through three doors. Above the doors a permanent backlit glass panel reads "Tonight Nifty Theater 3 reels - Change of Program." The lobby gives on to the auditorium which is level for 15 feet (4.6 m) before sloping down. The auditorium measures 65 feet (20 m) by 30 feet (9.1 m), with a second flat area of floor in front of the stage. The back wall features windows for a "crying room", from which parents could watch the movie while minding noisy children, as well as openings for projection. An office area opens into the east side of the auditorium, with a women's toilet on the west side, next to the stairs to the crying room. Fixed seating is provided in flip-up wood seats, with 158 seats at present. Exit doors lead outside from either side of the auditorium.

The stage rises about 3 feet (0.91 m) above the floor, with 6-foot (1.8 m) wide wings on either side. The stage is 17 feet (5.2 m) by 30 feet (9.1 m). A low wall separates the orchestra pit from the seating. Doors at the rear of the stage lead to dressing rooms. The stage edge is equipped with footlights, while the original painted stage backdrop remains operable.

A lower level under the auditorium is entered from the east and west, containing an apartment for the owners with a living room, dining room, kitchen, bathroom, two bedrooms and a utility room. The remainder of the space is crawl space, deepened at some points for storage and electrical panels.
