= Nifty Fifty (disambiguation) =

Nifty Fifty or Nifty 50 may refer to:

- Nifty Fifty, an informal term for 50 U.S. blue chip stocks in the mid-20th century
- NIFTY 50, an Indian stock market index
- Honda NQ50, also known as the Nifty 50
- Normal lens with a focal length of 50 mm
