= Douglas, Washington =

Unincorporated community in Washington, United States

Douglas
- Unincorporated community
- Interactive map of Douglas
- Coordinates: 47°37′19″N 120°00′09″W
- Country: United States
- State: Washington
- County: Douglas
- Elevation: 2,379 ft (725 m)
- ZIP code: 98858
- Area code: 509
- FIPS code: 17-18440
- GNIS feature ID: 1518894

Douglas is an unincorporated community located in Douglas County, Washington, east of Waterville. Established in 1883, it is home to approximately 30 residents.

== History ==
Douglas was established in 1883, with many families moving from their native towns and settling in a less populated area. They started offering classes 5 years later in 1887. By 1900, the community was housing about 75 residents. A general store was built in 1905, and has become a main attraction since then. In 1909, the Northern Railway's Mansfield spur line began operation, and trains were running through the community until 1985, when the rails shut down.
