= Rock Island, Washington =

- City
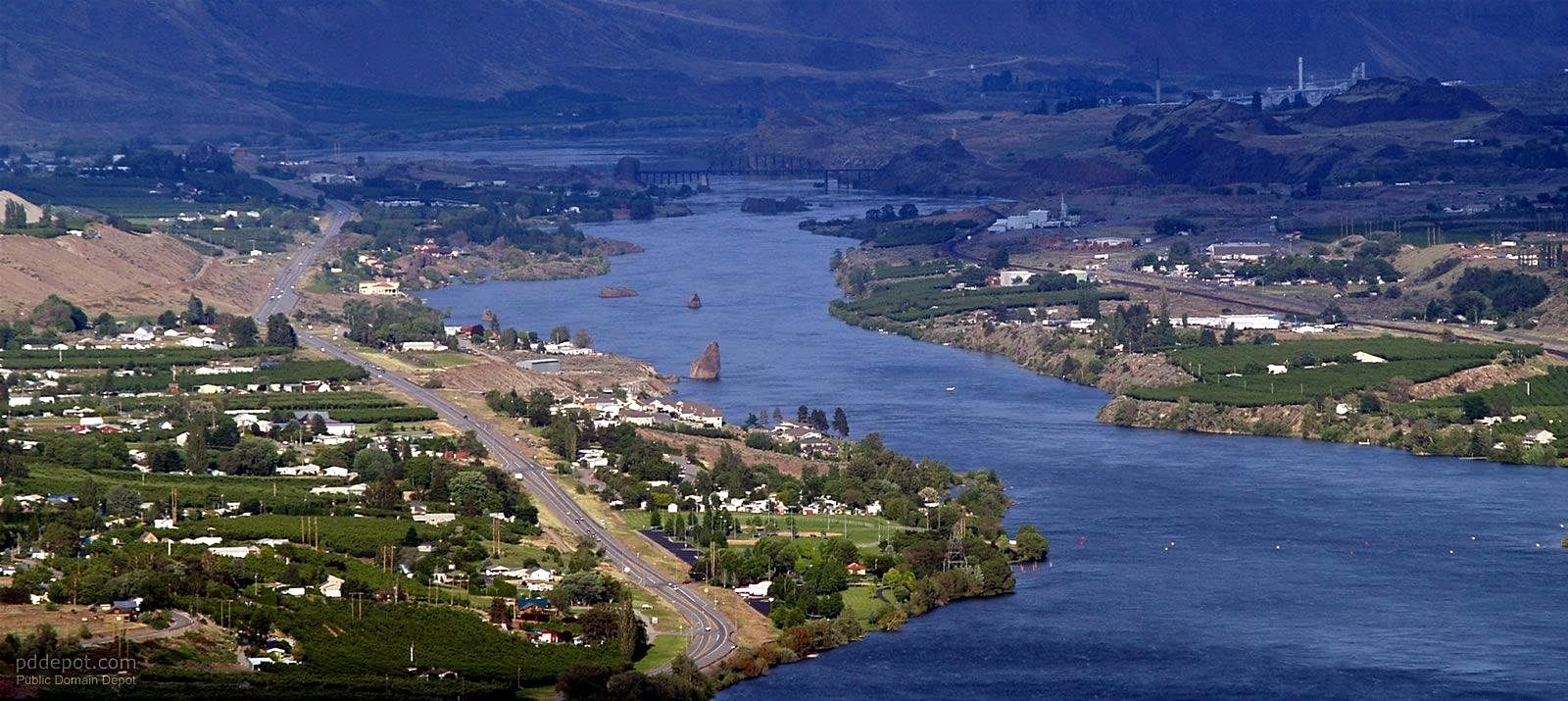
- View of Rock Island, looking east up the Columbia River towards the Great Northern Railway bridge

- Location of Rock Island, Washington
- Coordinates: 47°22′28″N 120°07′52″W
- Country: United States
- State: Washington
- County: Douglas

Government
  - Type: Mayor–council
  - Mayor: Paul Downs

Area
  - Total: 1.40 sq mi (3.62 km^{2})
  - Land: 1.13 sq mi (2.92 km^{2})
  - Water: 0.27 sq mi (0.70 km^{2})
- Elevation: 650 ft (200 m)

Population (2020)
  - Total: 1,279
  - Density: 1,130/sq mi (438/km^{2})
- Time zone: UTC-8 (Pacific (PST))
  - Summer (DST): UTC-7 (PDT)
- ZIP code: 98850
- Area code: 509
- FIPS code: 53-59180
- GNIS feature ID: 2410975
- Website: rockislandwa.gov

Rock Island is a city in Douglas County, Washington, United States. It is part of the Wenatchee–East Wenatchee Metropolitan Statistical Area. The population was 1,279 at the 2020 census.

== History ==
Rock Island was officially incorporated on November 3, 1930. The area of Rock Island was used by Native American tribes for fishing and crossing of the Columbia River due to the nearby Rock Island Rapids prior to settlement of the Washington Territory.

The site had been previously settled in the late 19th century and was known as Hammond; early maps sometimes show the city as Hammond P.O. (Post Office) or Power City. In the teacup valley in which Rock Island is currently located, two men, Ingraham and McBride, opened a trading post in the early 1860s. Their patrons were local Native Americans, who often fished that stretch of the Columbia when the fish were running. The two pioneering men would later move their post to the mouth of the Wenatchee River, leaving little trace of their stay.

The most notable figure in Rock Island's founding is James E. Keane. As the first permanent settler to the Rock Island area, James Keane arrived with a crew of men in 1887. Keane planned to build a home and improve the land that he had acquired through the Homestead, Pre-emption, and Desert Acts. Four years later, the Great Northern Railroad made its first survey of the area and began construction toward the valley from the east. One half mile upriver from the well-known Rock Island Rapids, Mr. Keane platted a townsite he named Hammond.

Hammond was located nearly 2.5 miles south of the present site of the City of Rock Island due to changes in planning by the Great Northern Railway. Keane moved his townsite to this new area and named it Rock Island, named aptly for the rock islands in the Columbia River near the site. Between 1891 and 1893, Rock Island became a town of considerable importance for the railroad. The mammoth steel bridge that was built across the Columbia drew many laborers to the area, and the small town boomed. Several stores popped up to meet the needs of the workers, and the Rock Island Sun newspaper began publication.

The site was thought to be the area where the large city of the area would develop as it was located near the Rock Island Rapids and near the bridge which spanned the Columbia River for the Great Northern Railway. Despite these strategic advantages, the large city in the area would become Wenatchee, just seven miles upriver from the site of present-day Rock Island. In 1893, however, the completion of that first bridge across the Columbia marked the downfall of Rock Island. With few jobs in town to entice them, the employees of the railroad moved away.

In 1930, Rock Island boomed again when the Puget Sound Power and Light Company began construction of a dam just below the Rock Island Rapids. The project was estimated at 10 million dollars and the Rock Island Dam was to be the first dam on the Columbia River. On November 3, 1930, with the construction of the dam in full swing, Rock Island was officially incorporated as a Washington town, with a population of 421 residents. The town boomed for a second time in its history as workers for the dam project created temporary villages near the town, but it could not last. When two of the dam's generators began producing power in 1931, and the final spillway was closed in 1932, Rock Island again faced a bust and a loss of residents.

Many Native American pictographs were destroyed with the construction of the Rock Island Dam. A small sampling of pictographs saved prior to the construction of Rock Island Dam can be seen at the Wenatchee Valley Museum & Cultural Center in nearby Wenatchee. During World War II a silicon smelter would be built in the town of Rock Island, closing in 1999. Rock Island was also home to a nearby state park, appearing on maps until the late 1940s.

== Geography ==
According to the United States Census Bureau, the city has a total area of 0.75 square miles (1.94 km^{2}), of which, 0.61 square miles (1.58 km^{2}) is land and 0.14 square miles (0.36 km^{2}) is water.

=== Climate ===
This region experiences warm (but not hot) and dry summers, with no average monthly temperatures above 71.6 °F. According to the Köppen Climate Classification system, Rock Island has a warm-summer Mediterranean climate, abbreviated "Csb" on climate maps.

== Demographics ==
Historical population
Census	Pop.	Note	%±
1940	377		—
1950	360		−4.5%
1960	260		−27.8%
1970	191		−26.5%
1980	491		157.1%
1990	524		6.7%
2000	863		64.7%
2010	788		−8.7%
2020	1,279		62.3%
U.S. Decennial Census; 2020 Census

=== 2020 census ===
As of the 2020 census, Rock Island had a population of 1,279. The median age was 34.0 years. 26.7% of residents were under the age of 18 and 12.4% of residents were 65 years of age or older. For every 100 females there were 107.0 males, and for every 100 females age 18 and over there were 101.3 males age 18 and over.

97.7% of residents lived in urban areas, while 2.3% lived in rural areas.

There were 414 households in Rock Island, of which 38.6% had children under the age of 18 living in them. Of all households, 49.3% were married-couple households, 18.8% were households with a male householder and no spouse or partner present, and 23.2% were households with a female householder and no spouse or partner present. About 23.7% of all households were made up of individuals and 10.6% had someone living alone who was 65 years of age or older.

There were 439 housing units, of which 5.7% were vacant. The homeowner vacancy rate was 1.3% and the rental vacancy rate was 5.4%.

Racial composition as of the 2020 census
Race	Number	Percent
White	645	50.4%
Black or African American	9	0.7%
American Indian and Alaska Native	16	1.3%
Asian	0	0.0%
Native Hawaiian and Other Pacific Islander	6	0.5%
Some other race	361	28.2%
Two or more races	242	18.9%
Hispanic or Latino (of any race)	667	52.2%

=== 2010 census ===
As of the 2010 census, there were 788 people, 262 households, and 179 families residing in the city. The population density was 1,291.8 inhabitants per square mile (498.8/km^{2}). There were 277 housing units at an average density of 454.1 per square mile (175.3/km^{2}). The racial makeup of the city was 63.7% White, 0.8% African American, 0.5% Native American, 0.1% Asian, 0.1% Pacific Islander, 32.6% from other races, and 2.2% from two or more races. Hispanic or Latino of any race were 51.4% of the population.

There were 262 households, of which 39.7% had children under the age of 18 living with them, 51.1% were married couples living together, 10.7% had a female householder with no husband present, 6.5% had a male householder with no wife present, and 31.7% were non-families. 26.3% of all households were made up of individuals, and 7.3% had someone living alone who was 65 years of age or older. The average household size was 3.01 and the average family size was 3.66.

The median age in the city was 32.5 years. 32.1% of residents were under the age of 18; 9.5% were between the ages of 18 and 24; 22.9% were from 25 to 44; 26.3% were from 45 to 64; and 9.3% were 65 years of age or older. The gender makeup of the city was 53.3% male and 46.7% female.

=== 2000 census ===
As of the 2000 census, there were 863 people, 270 households, and 204 families residing in the city. The population density was 1,460.9 people per square mile (564.8/km^{2}). There were 276 housing units at an average density of 467.2 per square mile (180.6/km^{2}). The racial makeup of the city was 74.16% White, 0.81% African American, 1.51% Native American, 0.70% Asian, 20.39% from other races, and 2.43% from two or more races. Hispanic or Latino of any race were 30.59% of the population.

There were 270 households, out of which 45.9% had children under the age of 18 living with them, 59.3% were married couples living together, 12.2% had a female householder with no husband present, and 24.4% were non-families. 18.5% of all households were made up of individuals, and 6.3% had someone living alone who was 65 years of age or older. The average household size was 3.20 and the average family size was 3.66.

In the city, the age distribution of the population shows 35.7% under the age of 18, 9.8% from 18 to 24, 29.0% from 25 to 44, 17.1% from 45 to 64, and 8.3% who were 65 years of age or older. The median age was 29 years. For every 100 females, there were 96.1 males. For every 100 females age 18 and over, there were 94.7 males.

The median income for a household in the city was $33,618, and the median income for a family was $34,408. Males had a median income of $24,773 versus $19,602 for females. The per capita income for the city was $14,129. About 11.6% of families and 11.6% of the population were below the poverty line, including 10.4% of those under age 18 and 30.4% of those age 65 or over.

== Education ==
The city is served by the Eastmont School District.
