= Palisades, Washington =

Unincorporated community in Washington, United States

- Unincorporated community
- Location within Washington (state)
- Coordinates: 47°25′08″N 119°54′52″W
- Country: United States
- State: Washington
- County: Douglas
- Elevation: 981 ft (299 m)
- Time zone: UTC-8 (Pacific (PST))
  - Summer (DST): UTC-7 (PDT)
- ZIP code: 98845
- Area code: 509
- GNIS feature ID: 1531057

Palisades is an unincorporated community in Douglas County, Washington, United States. Palisades is 17.5 miles (28.2 km) east of East Wenatchee. Palisades has a post office with ZIP code 98845.

A post office called Palisades was established in 1908. The community was named for a nearby rock formation.
