= Withrow, Washington =

Unincorporated community in Washington, US

- Unincorporated community
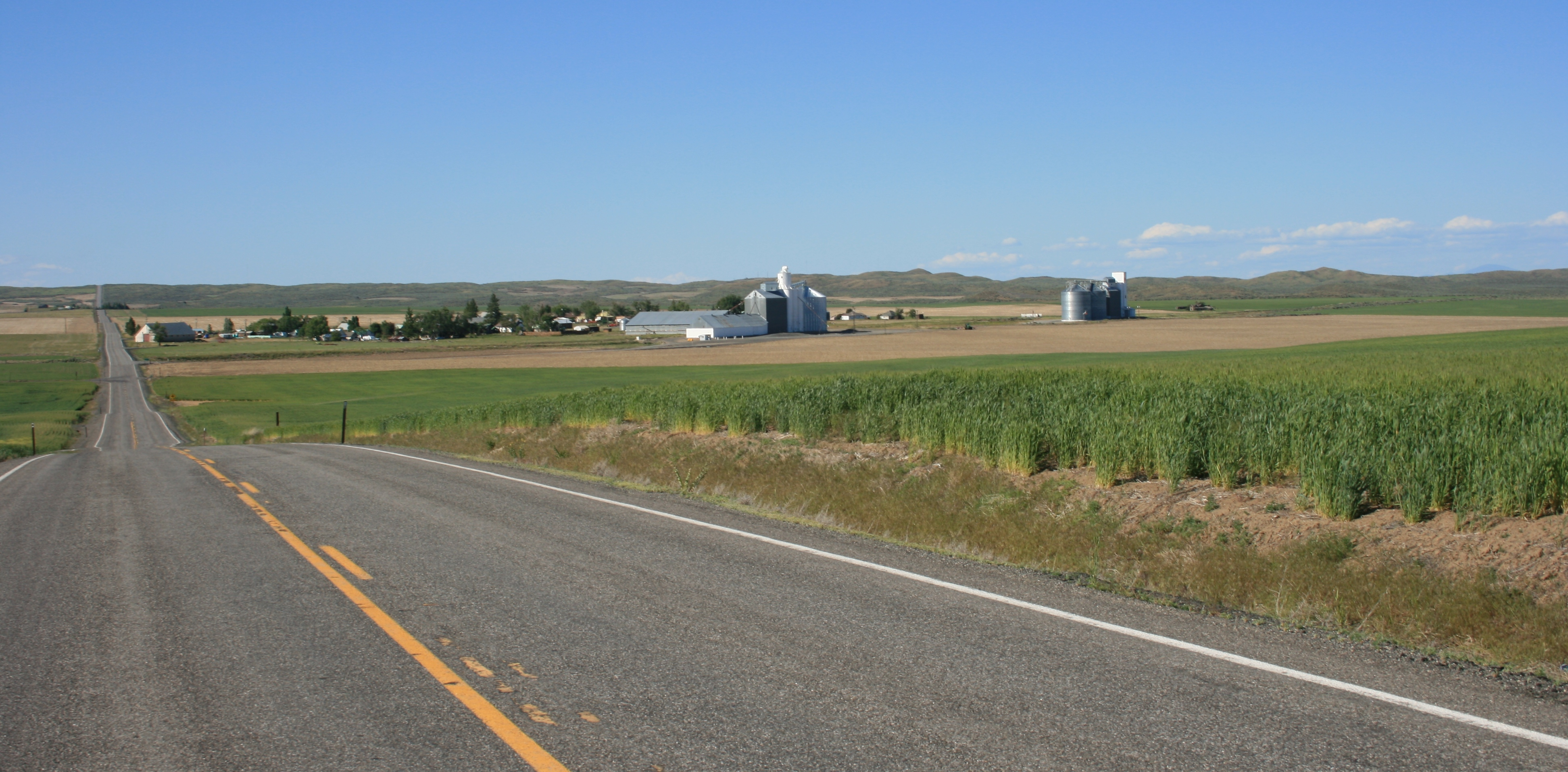
- Withrow and hills that comprise the terminal moraine for the Okanagan lobe of the Cordilleran Ice Sheet

- Location within Washington (state)
- Coordinates: 47°42′17.5″N 119°48′31.2″W
- Country: United States
- State: Washington
- County: Douglas
- Elevation: 2,526 ft (770 m)
- Time zone: UTC-8 (Pacific (PST))
  - Summer (DST): UTC-7 (PDT)
- Area code: 509
- GNIS feature ID: 1512810

Withrow is an unincorporated community in Douglas County, Washington, United States. The town is named for J.J. Withrow, a cattleman.

== Geography ==
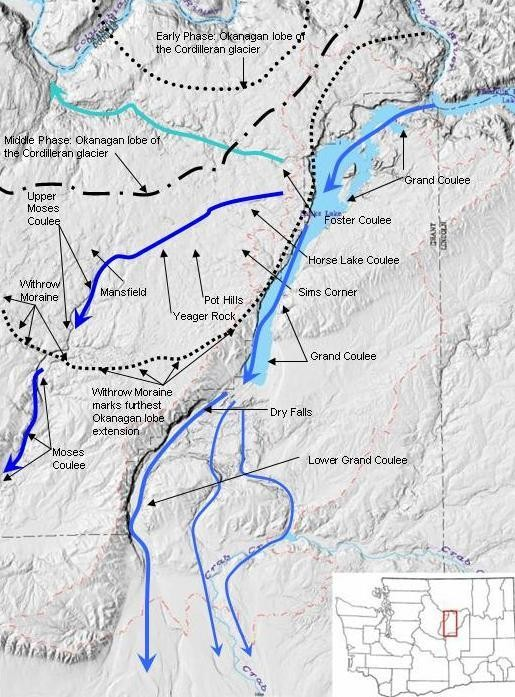
Illustration of the glacial impacts

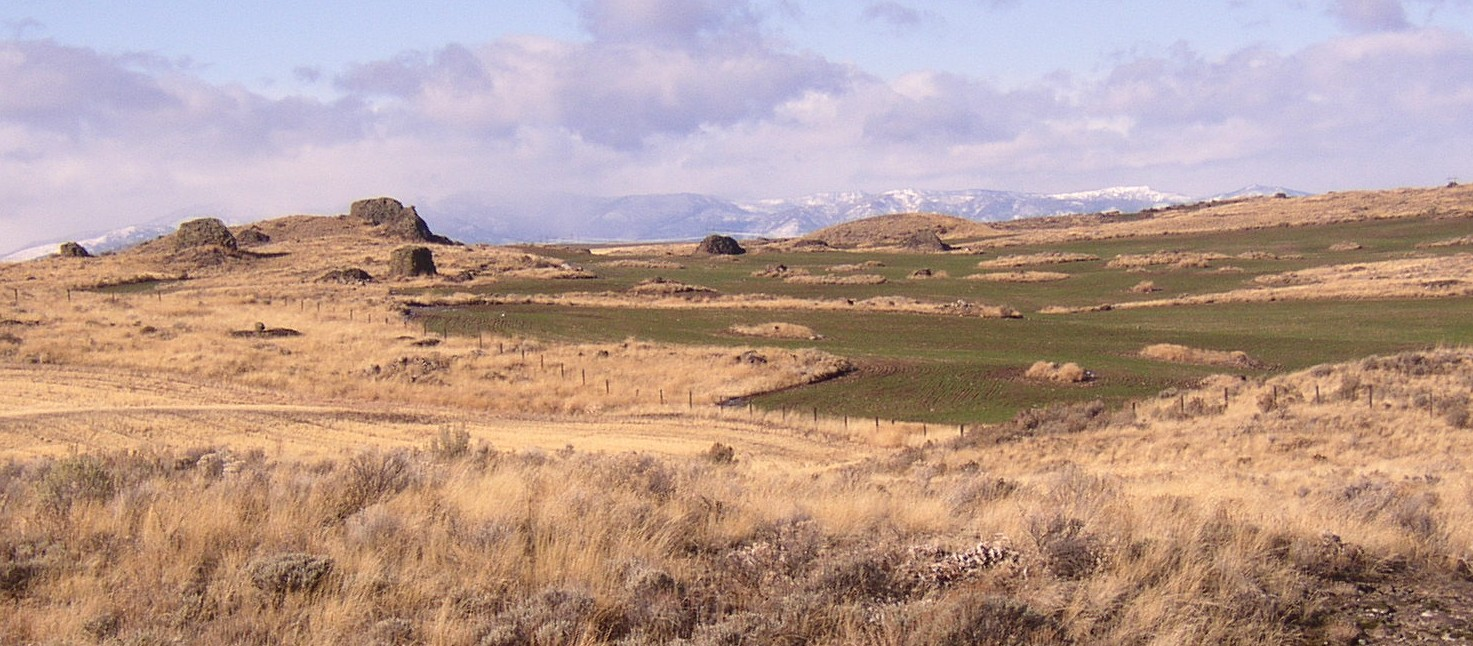
The Withrow Moraine includes erratics on glacial till at the terminus of the Okanogan lobe just north of Withrow.

Located between Seattle and Spokane, Withrow lies at the base of Withrow Moraine and Jameson Lake Drumlin Field, a National Park Service designated privately owned National Natural Landmark located in Douglas County, Washington state, United States. Withrow Moraine is the only Ice Age terminal moraine on the Waterville Plateau section of the Columbia Plateau. It lies on the terminal moraine for the Okanogan lobe of the Cordilleran Ice Sheet, which flowed southward through the Okanogan trough from the Interior Plateau of British Columbia blocking the course of the Columbia River and ending on the elevations of the Waterville Plateau.
