= Douglas County, Washington =

County in Washington, United States

- County
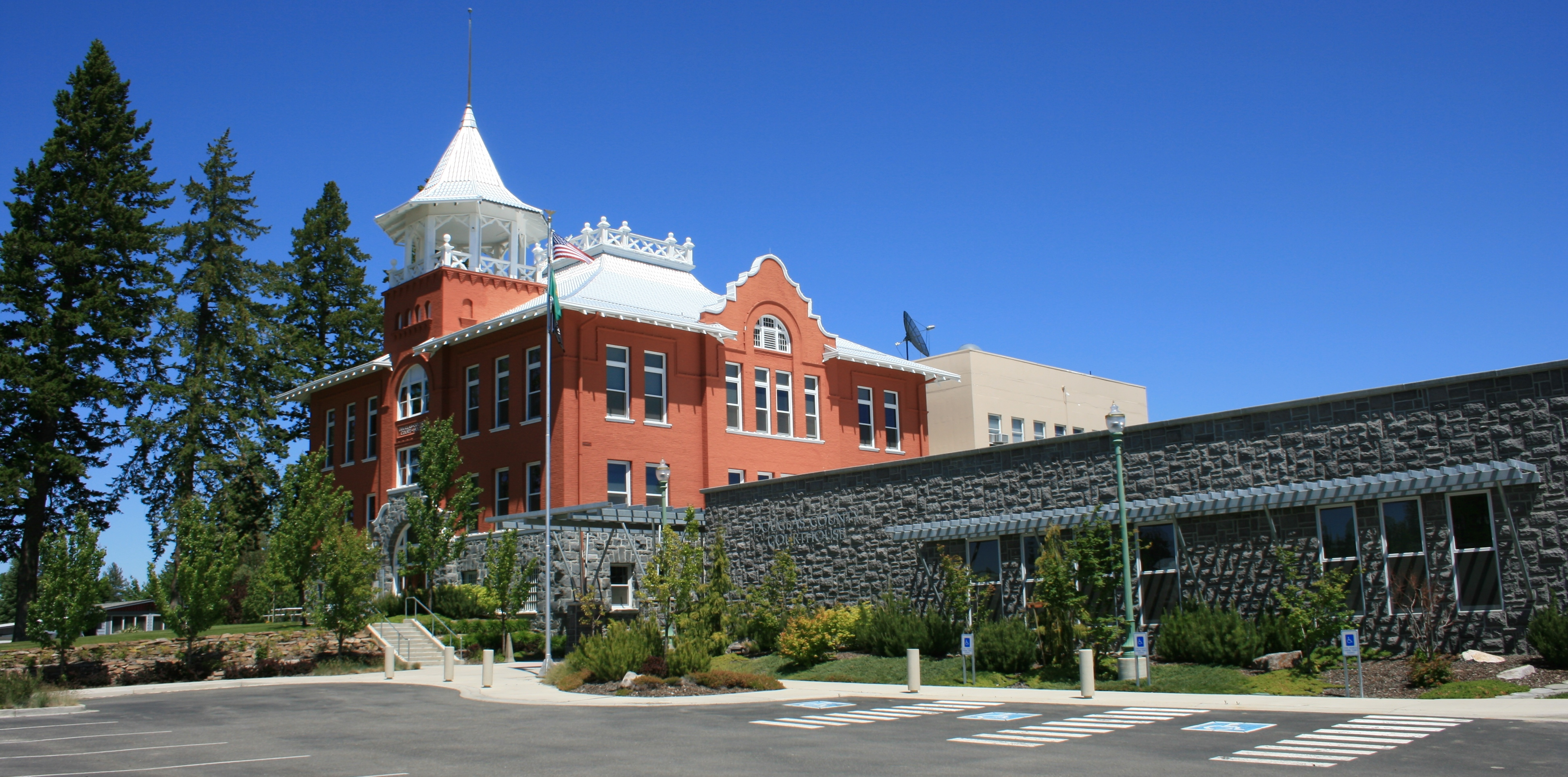
- County Courthouse

- Seal

- Location within the U.S. state of Washington
- Coordinates: 47°44′N 119°41′W
- Country: United States
- State: Washington
- Founded: November 28, 1883
- Named for: Stephen A. Douglas
- Seat: Waterville
- Largest city: East Wenatchee

Area
  - Total: 1,849 sq mi (4,790 km^{2})
  - Land: 1,819 sq mi (4,710 km^{2})
  - Water: 29 sq mi (75 km^{2}) 1.6%

Population (2020)
  - Total: 42,938
  - Estimate (2025): 46,473 ▲
  - Density: 22/sq mi (8.5/km^{2})
- Time zone: UTC−8 (Pacific)
  - Summer (DST): UTC−7 (PDT)
- Congressional districts: 4th, 8th
- Website: www.douglascountywa.gov

Douglas County is a county located in the U.S. state of Washington. As of the 2020 census, its population was 42,938. The county seat is Waterville, while its largest settlement is East Wenatchee. The county was created out of Lincoln County on November 28, 1883 and is named for American statesman Stephen A. Douglas.

Douglas County is part of the Wenatchee, WA Metropolitan Statistical Area.

== Geography ==
According to the United States Census Bureau, the county has a total area of 1,849 square miles (4,790 km^{2}), of which 1,819 square miles (4,710 km^{2}) is land and 29 square miles (75 km^{2}) (1.6%) is water.

=== Geographic features ===
- Columbia River

=== Major highways ===
- U.S. Route 2
- U.S. Route 97

=== Adjacent counties ===
- Okanogan County – north
- Grant County – south
- Kittitas County – southwest
- Chelan County – west

== Demographics ==
Historical population
Census	Pop.	Note	%±
1890	3,161		—
1900	4,926		55.8%
1910	9,227		87.3%
1920	9,392		1.8%
1930	7,561		−19.5%
1940	8,651		14.4%
1950	10,817		25.0%
1960	14,890		37.7%
1970	16,787		12.7%
1980	22,144		31.9%
1990	26,205		18.3%
2000	32,603		24.4%
2010	38,431		17.9%
2020	42,938		11.7%
2025 (est.)	46,473	▲	8.2%
U.S. Decennial Census; 1790–1960 1900–1990; 1990–2000 2010–2020

=== 2020 census ===
As of the 2020 census, the county had a population of 42,938. Of the residents, 25.0% were under the age of 18 and 18.0% were 65 years of age or older; the median age was 38.4 years. For every 100 females there were 101.5 males, and for every 100 females age 18 and over there were 100.6 males. 74.6% of residents lived in urban areas and 25.4% lived in rural areas.

Douglas County, Washington – Racial and ethnic composition Note: the US Census treats Hispanic/Latino as an ethnic category. This table excludes Latinos from the racial categories and assigns them to a separate category. Hispanics/Latinos may be of any race.
Race / Ethnicity (NH = Non-Hispanic)	Pop 2000	Pop 2010	Pop 2020	% 2000	% 2010	% 2020
White alone (NH)	25,179	26,070	25,445	77.23%	67.84%	59.26%
Black or African American alone (NH)	62	85	117	0.19%	0.22%	0.27%
Native American or Alaska Native alone (NH)	275	293	338	0.84%	0.76%	0.79%
Asian alone (NH)	168	269	406	0.52%	0.70%	0.95%
Pacific Islander alone (NH)	20	51	55	0.06%	0.13%	0.13%
Other race alone (NH)	28	52	203	0.09%	0.14%	0.47%
Mixed race or Multiracial (NH)	438	598	1,737	1.34%	1.56%	4.05%
Hispanic or Latino (any race)	6,433	11,013	14,637	19.73%	28.66%	34.09%
Total	32,603	38,431	42,938	100.00%	100.00%	100.00%

The racial makeup of the county was 64.8% White, 0.3% Black or African American, 1.6% American Indian and Alaska Native, 1.0% Asian, 17.9% from some other race, and 14.2% from two or more races. Hispanic or Latino residents of any race comprised 34.1% of the population.

There were 15,415 households in the county, of which 34.7% had children under the age of 18 living with them and 21.7% had a female householder with no spouse or partner present. About 21.2% of all households were made up of individuals and 10.5% had someone living alone who was 65 years of age or older.

There were 17,318 housing units, of which 11.0% were vacant. Among occupied housing units, 70.7% were owner-occupied and 29.3% were renter-occupied. The homeowner vacancy rate was 0.7% and the rental vacancy rate was 4.0%.

=== 2010 census ===
As of the 2010 census, there were 38,431 people, 13,894 households, and 10,240 families living in the county. The population density was 21.1 inhabitants per square mile (8.1/km^{2}). There were 16,004 housing units at an average density of 8.8 units per square mile (3.4 units/km^{2}). The racial makeup of the county was 79.6% White, 1.1% American Indian, 0.7% Asian, 0.3% black or African American, 0.1% Pacific islander, 15.6% from other races, and 2.6% from two or more races. Those of Hispanic or Latino origin made up 28.7% of the population. In terms of ancestry, 20.2% were German, 11.2% were English, 9.4% were Irish, 6.0% were Norwegian, and 5.0% were American.

Of the 13,894 households, 37.2% had children under the age of 18 living with them, 57.8% were married couples living together, 10.7% had a female householder with no husband present, 26.3% were non-families, and 20.8% of all households were made up of individuals. The average household size was 2.75 and the average family size was 3.18. The median age was 36.8 years.

The median income for a household in the county was $48,708 and the median income for a family was $55,766. Males had a median income of $39,991 versus $31,706 for females. The per capita income for the county was $22,359. About 10.2% of families and 14.3% of the population were below the poverty line, including 22.0% of those under age 18 and 3.7% of those age 65 or over.

=== 2000 census ===
As of the 2000 census, there were 32,603 people, 11,726 households, and 8,876 families living in the county. The population density was 18 people per square mile (6.9 people/km^{2}). There were 12,944 housing units at an average density of 7 units per square mile (2.7 units/km^{2}). The racial makeup of the county was 84.65% White, 0.31% Black or African American, 1.09% Native American, 0.55% Asian, 0.10% Pacific Islander, 10.83% from other races, and 2.48% from two or more races. 19.73% of the population were Hispanic or Latino of any race. 18.0% were of German, 10.0% English, 9.3% United States or American and 7.8% Irish ancestry. 81.5% spoke English, and 17.7% Spanish as their first language.

There were 11,726 households, out of which 38.40% had children under the age of 18 living with them, 61.60% were married couples living together, 9.70% had a female householder with no husband present, and 24.30% were non-families. 20.00% of all households were made up of individuals, and 7.80% had someone living alone who was 65 years of age or older. The average household size was 2.76 and the average family size was 3.16.

In the county, the population was spread out, with 29.50% under the age of 18, 8.20% from 18 to 24, 27.30% from 25 to 44, 22.40% from 45 to 64, and 12.70% who were 65 years of age or older. The median age was 36 years. For every 100 females, there were 98.20 males. For every 100 females age 18 and over, there were 96.00 males.

The median income for a household in the county was $38,464, and the median income for a family was $43,777. Males had a median income of $35,917 versus $24,794 for females. The per capita income for the county was $17,148. About 11.20% of families and 14.40% of the population were below the poverty line, including 21.00% of those under age 18 and 6.90% of those age 65 or over.

== Communities ==
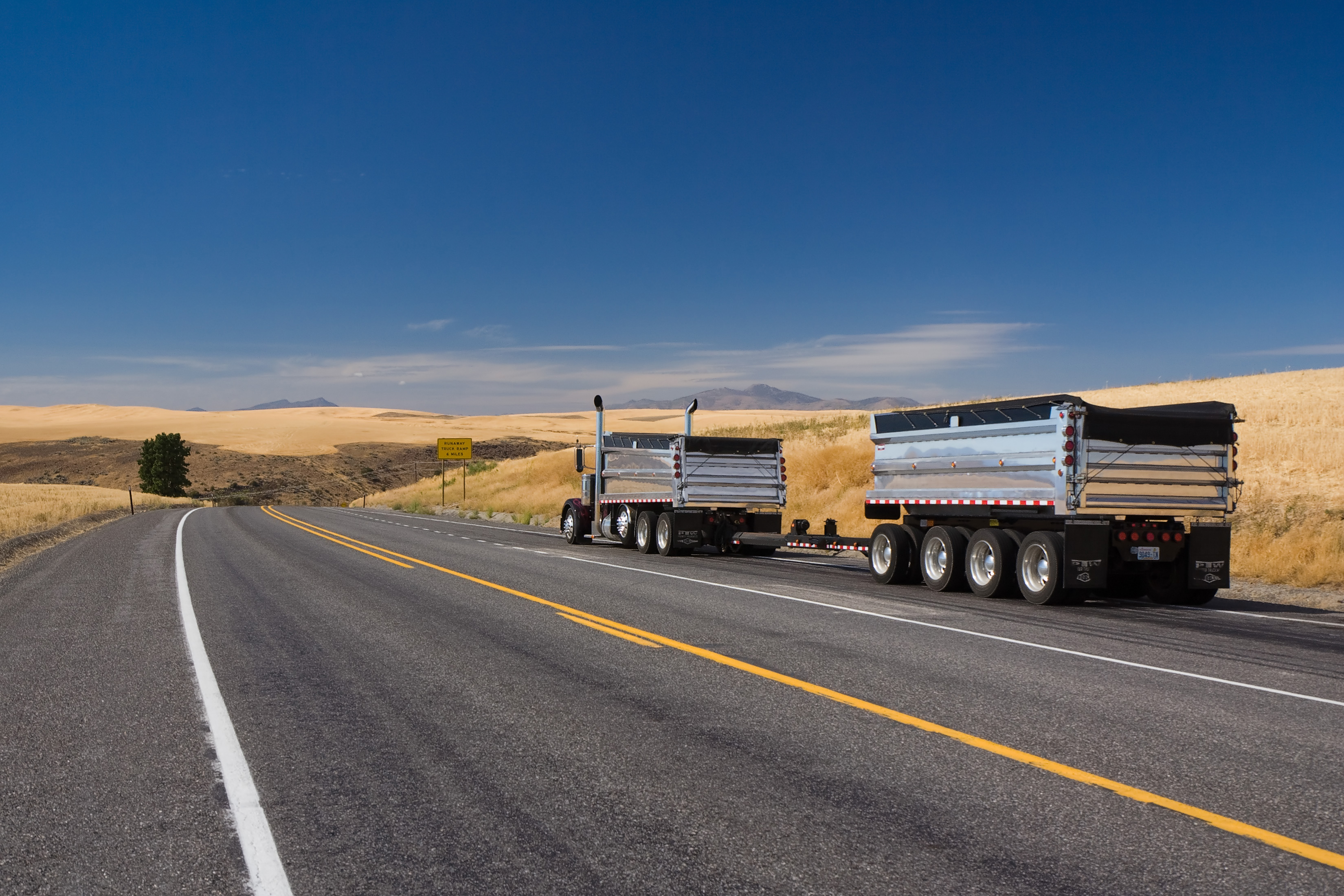
Truck driving through Douglas County on Route 2

=== Cities ===
- Bridgeport
- East Wenatchee
- Rock Island

=== Towns ===
- Coulee Dam (partial)
- Mansfield
- Waterville (county seat)

=== Unincorporated communities ===
- Beebe (Note: The community was named after James Beebe, a businessperson in the agriculture industry. A post office called Beebe was established in 1912, and remained in operation until 1942.)
- Douglas
- Lamoine
- Leahy
- Orondo
- Palisades
- Withrow

=== Ghost towns ===
- Alstown
- Baird
- Bonita
- Farmer
- Jameson
- Saint Andrews
- Sanderson
- Touhey

== Politics ==
Federally, Douglas County is represented primarily by Dan Newhouse (R) of the 4th while parts of East Wenatchee have been siphoned off into the 8th, represented by Democrat Kim Schrier. It is one of the most strongly Republican counties in the state in presidential elections, and has not voted for a Democratic candidate since 1964, in Lyndon B. Johnson's rout of Barry Goldwater.

United States presidential election results for Douglas County, Washington
Year	Republican		Democratic		Third party(ies)	
Year	No.	%	No.	%	No.	%
1892	345	37.70%	253	27.65%	317	34.64%
1896	334	31.01%	733	68.06%	10	0.93%
1900	516	44.44%	615	52.97%	30	2.58%
1904	1,722	71.30%	577	23.89%	116	4.80%
1908	1,942	52.20%	1,540	41.40%	238	6.40%
1912	642	20.16%	1,357	42.61%	1,186	37.24%
1916	1,125	34.95%	1,916	59.52%	178	5.53%
1920	1,587	57.86%	918	33.47%	238	8.68%
1924	1,070	42.19%	398	15.69%	1,068	42.11%
1928	1,760	66.34%	862	32.49%	31	1.17%
1932	1,179	35.07%	1,941	57.73%	242	7.20%
1936	1,025	29.75%	2,290	66.47%	130	3.77%
1940	1,959	49.33%	1,972	49.66%	40	1.01%
1944	1,809	49.36%	1,832	49.99%	24	0.65%
1948	1,703	42.23%	2,251	55.81%	79	1.96%
1952	2,954	55.43%	2,361	44.30%	14	0.26%
1956	2,602	46.09%	3,034	53.75%	9	0.16%
1960	3,241	51.07%	3,087	48.64%	18	0.28%
1964	2,643	41.45%	3,728	58.47%	5	0.08%
1968	3,234	48.52%	2,764	41.47%	667	10.01%
1972	4,512	60.31%	2,420	32.35%	549	7.34%
1976	4,547	53.09%	3,809	44.48%	208	2.43%
1980	5,171	59.38%	2,833	32.53%	705	8.10%
1984	6,443	66.44%	3,127	32.24%	128	1.32%
1988	5,378	58.16%	3,760	40.66%	109	1.18%
1992	4,920	44.53%	3,731	33.77%	2,397	21.70%
1996	5,682	52.01%	3,913	35.82%	1,330	12.17%
2000	8,512	66.22%	3,822	29.73%	521	4.05%
2004	8,900	66.56%	4,306	32.20%	166	1.24%
2008	9,098	59.82%	5,848	38.45%	263	1.73%
2012	9,425	63.08%	5,166	34.57%	351	2.35%
2016	9,603	60.39%	4,918	30.93%	1,380	8.68%
2020	12,955	60.80%	7,811	36.66%	542	2.54%
2024	13,095	61.82%	7,410	34.98%	677	3.20%

== Education ==
School districts include:

- Brewster School District
- Bridgeport School District
- Coulee-Hartline School District
- Eastmont School District
- Ephrata School District
- Grand Coulee Dam School District
- Lake Chelan School District
- Mansfield School District
- Orondo School District
- Palisades School District
- Quincy School District
- Waterville School District

== See also ==
- Douglas County PUD
- National Register of Historic Places listings in Douglas County, Washington
- Mansfield Branch (Great Northern Railway)
