= Waterville, Washington =

- Town
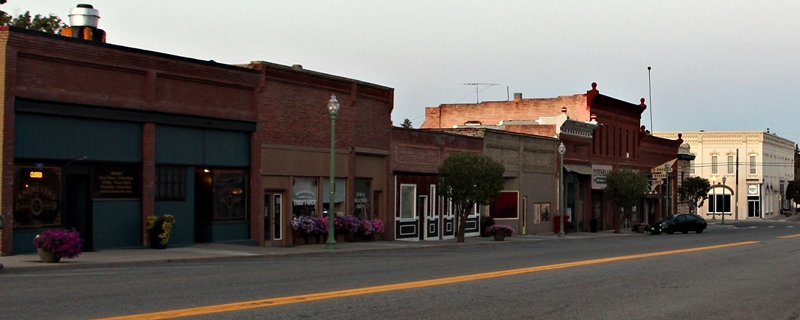
- Downtown Waterville pictured in 2018

- Location of Waterville, Washington
- Coordinates: 47°38′52″N 120°4′22″W
- Country: United States
- State: Washington
- County: Douglas

Government
  - Type: Mayor–council
  - Mayor: Loyd Smith

Area
  - Total: 0.86 sq mi (2.24 km^{2})
  - Land: 0.86 sq mi (2.24 km^{2})
  - Water: 0 sq mi (0.00 km^{2})
- Elevation: 2,628 ft (801 m)

Population (2020)
  - Total: 1,134
  - Density: 1,311.2/sq mi (506.25/km^{2})
- Time zone: UTC-8 (Pacific (PST))
  - Summer (DST): UTC-7 (PDT)
- ZIP code: 98858
- Area code: 509
- FIPS code: 53-76510
- GNIS feature ID: 2413455
- Website: Town of Waterville

Waterville is a town in and the county seat of Douglas County, Washington, United States. As a part of Douglas County, it is part of the Wenatchee-East Wenatchee metropolitan area. The population was 1,134 at the 2020 census.

The town is near Badger Mountain and Badger Mountain Ski Area.

== History ==
The area Waterville was settled in 1883 by A.T. Greene. In 1886 he successfully encouraged land donations and the town was established under the name "Jumper's Flat." After the discovery of a large water reservoir underneath Greene's farm, the town was renamed to "Waterville."

== Geography ==
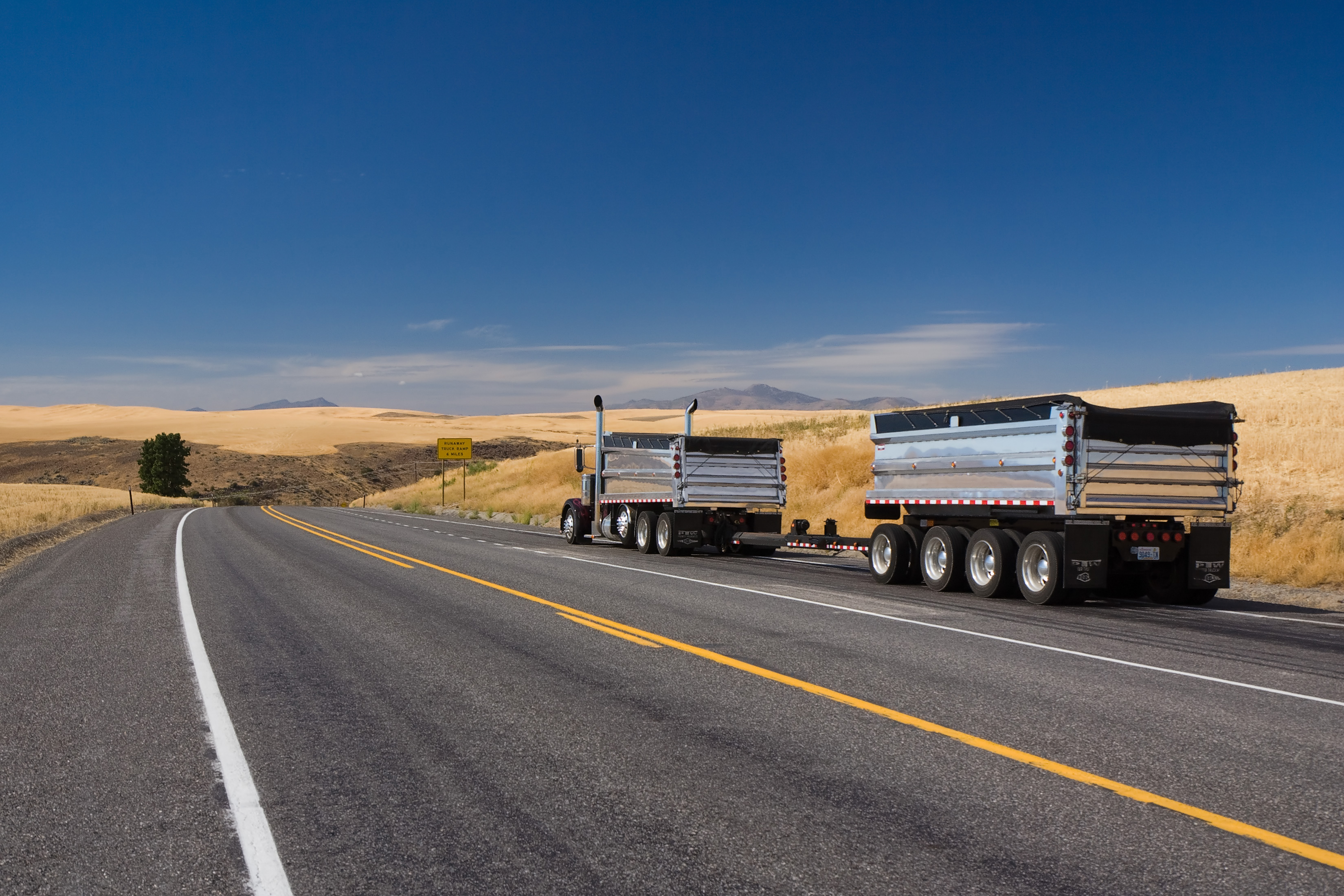
Truck in front of a wheat field near Waterville

Waterville during a snow storm.

According to the United States Census Bureau, the town has a total area of 0.87 square miles (2.25 km^{2}), all of it land.

Like most of Eastern Washington, Waterville has a semi-arid climate (Köppen BSk) with cold, moist winters and hot, dry summers.

At 2,625 ft (800 m), Waterville has the highest elevation of any incorporated city or town in Washington.

Climate data for Waterville, Washington
Month	Jan	Feb	Mar	Apr	May	Jun	Jul	Aug	Sep	Oct	Nov	Dec	Year
Record high °F (°C)	66 (19)	59 (15)	74 (23)	88 (31)	96 (36)	102 (39)	105 (41)	104 (40)	97 (36)	84 (29)	68 (20)	56 (13)	105 (41)
Mean daily maximum °F (°C)	30.3 (−0.9)	36.1 (2.3)	45.7 (7.6)	57.1 (13.9)	66.2 (19.0)	73.5 (23.1)	82.7 (28.2)	81.6 (27.6)	72.0 (22.2)	58.3 (14.6)	41.1 (5.1)	31.9 (−0.1)	56.4 (13.6)
Mean daily minimum °F (°C)	14.8 (−9.6)	18.9 (−7.3)	26.7 (−2.9)	34.1 (1.2)	41.0 (5.0)	47.0 (8.3)	52.5 (11.4)	52.3 (11.3)	44.6 (7.0)	34.9 (1.6)	25.1 (−3.8)	17.6 (−8.0)	34.1 (1.2)
Record low °F (°C)	−30 (−34)	−25 (−32)	−10 (−23)	11 (−12)	16 (−9)	29 (−2)	32 (0)	29 (−2)	15 (−9)	4 (−16)	−21 (−29)	−33 (−36)	−33 (−36)
Average precipitation inches (mm)	1.44 (37)	1.10 (28)	0.82 (21)	0.69 (18)	0.96 (24)	0.93 (24)	0.39 (9.9)	0.49 (12)	0.53 (13)	0.75 (19)	1.49 (38)	1.69 (43)	11.28 (286.9)
Average snowfall inches (cm)	11.4 (29)	8.2 (21)	3.4 (8.6)	0.7 (1.8)	trace	0.0 (0.0)	0.0 (0.0)	0.0 (0.0)	trace	0.4 (1.0)	6.6 (17)	14.0 (36)	44.9 (114)

== Demographics ==
Historical population
Census	Pop.	Note	%±
1890	293		—
1900	482		64.5%
1910	950		97.1%
1920	1,198		26.1%
1930	856		−28.5%
1940	939		9.7%
1950	1,013		7.9%
1960	1,013		0.0%
1970	919		−9.3%
1980	908		−1.2%
1990	995		9.6%
2000	1,163		16.9%
2010	1,138		−2.1%
2020	1,134		−0.4%

=== 2010 census ===
As of the 2010 census, there were 1,138 people, 449 households, and 316 families residing in the town. The population density was 1,308.0 inhabitants per square mile (505.0/km^{2}). There were 482 housing units at an average density of 554.0 per square mile (213.9/km^{2}). The racial makeup of the town was 94.5% White, 1.1% Native American, 0.6% Asian, 0.1% Pacific Islander, 2.5% from other races, and 1.1% from two or more races. Hispanic or Latino of any race were 9.8% of the population.

There were 449 households, of which 30.3% had children under the age of 18 living with them, 57.5% were married couples living together, 9.6% had a female householder with no husband present, 3.3% had a male householder with no wife present, and 29.6% were non-families. 23.8% of all households were made up of individuals, and 12.9% had someone living alone who was 65 years of age or older. The average household size was 2.51 and the average family size was 2.98.

The median age in the town was 43.3 years. 22.8% of residents were under the age of 18; 7.4% were between the ages of 18 and 24; 21.5% were from 25 to 44; 30.5% were from 45 to 64; and 17.9% were 65 years of age or older. The gender makeup of the town was 50.4% male and 49.6% female.

=== 2000 census ===
As of the 2000 census, there were 1,163 people, 433 households, and 314 families residing in the town. The population density was 1,365.4 people per square mile (528.3/km^{2}). There were 481 housing units at an average density of 564.7 per square mile (218.5/km^{2}). The racial makeup of the town was 90.11% White, 1.03% African American, 1.12% Native American, 0.26% Asian, 6.10% from other races, and 1.38% from two or more races. 8.77% of the population is Hispanic or Latino of any race.

There were 443 households, out of which 33.7% had children under the age of 18 living with them, 62.6% were married couples living together, 6.0% had a female householder with no husband present, and 27.3% were non-families. 24.0% of all households were made up of individuals, and 13.9% had someone living alone who was 65 years of age or older. The average household size was 2.65 and the average family size was 3.17.

In the town, the age distribution of the population shows 28.8% under the age of 18, 5.8% from 18 to 24, 23.4% from 25 to 44, 24.2% from 45 to 64, and 17.7% who were 65 years of age or older. The median age was 40 years. For every 100 females, there were 91.6 males. For every 100 females age 18 and over, there were 93.5 males.

The median income for a household in the town was $36,458, and the median income for a family was $47,386. Males had a median income of $35,375 versus $23,375 for females. The per capita income for the town was $18,880. About 5.0% of families and 7.5% of the population were below the poverty line, including 7.1% of those under age 18 and 2.8% of those age 65 or over.

== Education ==
The town is served by the Waterville School District,. which operates the town's public school.

== See also ==
- Downtown Waterville Historic District
- Great Northern Railway: Mansfield Branch (1909–1985)
