= Sawtooth Mountain =

Volcano in Washington, United States

Highest point
- Elevation: 5,354 ft (1,632 m)
- Coordinates: 46.07000°N 121.771°W

Geography
- Location: Skamania County, Washington, U.S.
- Parent range: Cascade Range
- Topo map: Lone Butte O46121a7 1:24,000

Geology
- Rock age: Pleistocene
- Mountain type: shield volcano
- Volcanic arc: Cascade Volcanic Arc
- Volcanic field: Indian Heaven

Climbing
- Easiest route: Sawtooth Mountain Trail, Exposed Scramble, class 3

Sawtooth Mountain is a shield volcano, and part of the polygenetic Indian Heaven Volcanic Field in Washington, United States. It is located midway between Mount St. Helens and Mount Adams, and dates from the Pleistocene and Holocene. Sawtooth Mountain is the third highest point at 5,354 feet (1,632 m)in this region. The mountain forms a series of welded volcanic rock spires, an eroded remnant of an ancient shield volcano. Sawtooth Mountain is the third highest point in the Indian Heaven Wilderness Area. While Sawtooth Mountain is not the highest, its craggy appearance makes it one of the most namesake peaks in the Indian Heaven Volcanic Field.

== Geographical setting ==
Sawtooth Mountain is the third highest peak the Indian Heaven Wilderness in Washington. On clear days hikers can see views of four nearby volcanoes: Mount Adams, Mount Hood, Mount St. Helens, and Mount Rainier from the Sawtooth Mountain Trail, which skirts the subalpine upper west side of Sawtooth Mountain. The shield volcano is noted as a series of eroded, volcanic spires. While the mountain is free of snow and ice, snow tends to linger on the summit well into July.

== Geology ==
Sawtooth Mountain is one of the many shield volcanoes topped by cinder cones and spatter cones that make up the Indian Heaven Volcanic Field. About 60 eruptive centers lie on the 19-mile (30 km) long, N10°E-trending, Indian Heaven fissure zone. The 230 square miles (600 km^{2}) field has a volume of about 20 cubic miles (100 km^{3}) and forms the western part of a 770-square-mile (2,000 km^{2}) Quaternary basalt field in the southern Washington Cascades, including the King Mountain fissure zone along which Mount Adams was built.

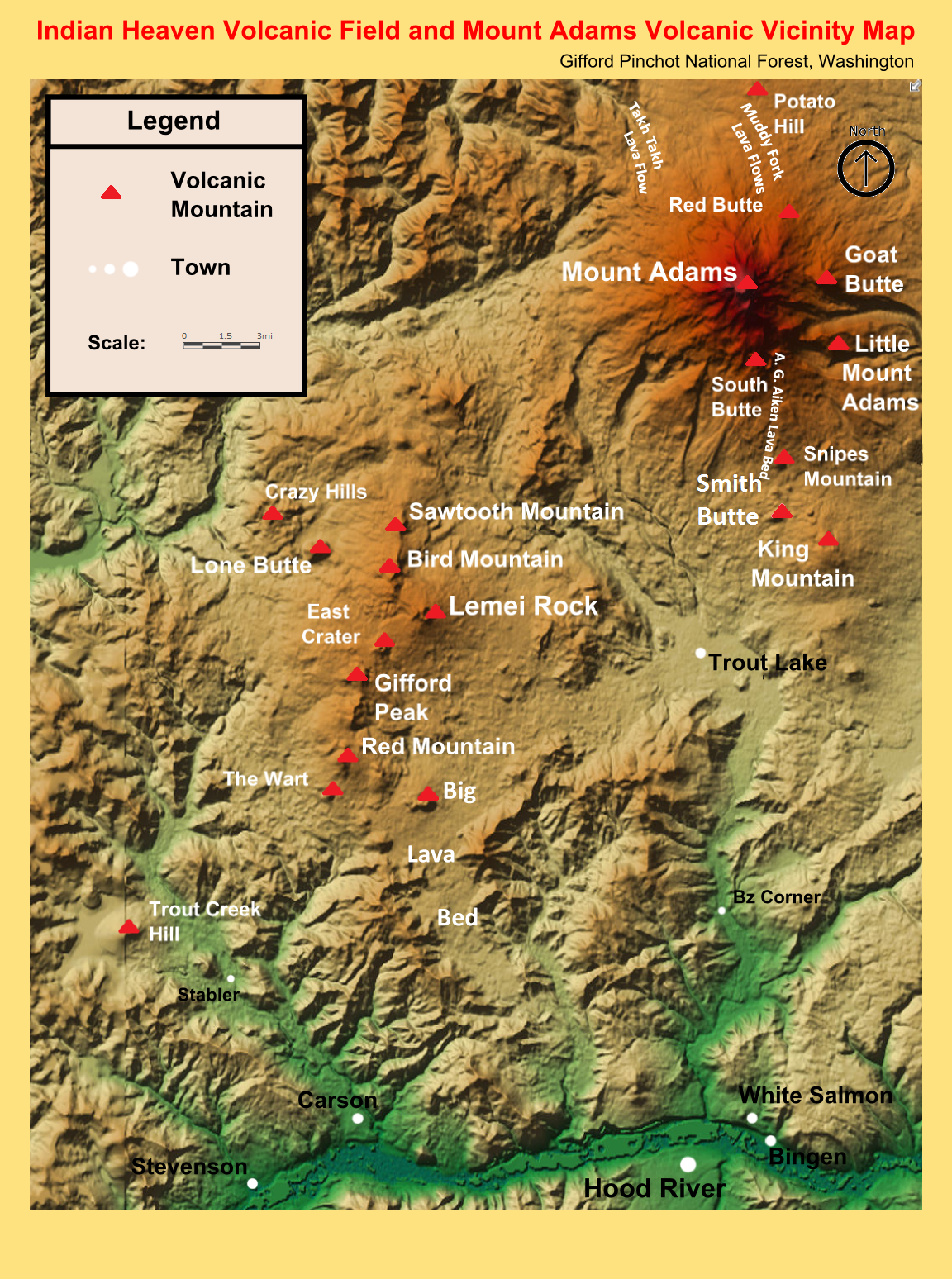
Indian Heaven Volcanic Field and Mount Adams Volcanic Vicinity Digital Relief Map showing Sawtooth Mountain and the various other peaks that make up the volcanic field.

Name	Elevation		Location	Last eruption
Name	meters	feet	Coordinates	Last eruption
Big Lava Bed	1,278.6	4,195	45.9°N 121.75°W	~8150 years ago
Bird Mountain	5,706	1,739	46.0392°N 121.78106°W	
Crazy Hills				
East Crater	1,614	5,295	46°N 121.78°W	
Gifford Peak	1,614	5,295		
Lemei Rock	1,806	5,925	46°1′6″N 121°45′36″W	
Lone Butte	1,457	4,780	46.05°N 121.87°W	
Red Mountain	1,513	4,964	45.93°N 121.82°W	
Sawtooth Mountain	1,632	5,354	46.07°N 121.78°W	

== Climbing and recreation ==
Fishing and hiking destinations in the volcanic field around Sawtooth Mountain include the Indian Heaven Wilderness, which is popular for the high mountain meadows among its volcanic peaks. The Pacific Crest National Scenic Trail passes north/south through the volcanic field and the Indian Heaven Wilderness, which is known for its many lakes and views of four nearby volcanoes: Mount Adams, Mount Hood, Mount St. Helens, and Mount Rainier. It also hugs the densely forested east side of Sawtooth Mountain, and in conjunction with the Sawtooth Mountain Trail, can be hiked in a loop beginning at the Sawtooth Trailhead. Wood Lake is to the west of the peak, and a spur trail (Wood Lake Trail) leaves the Pacific Crest Trail for the lake. Major trails at Sawtooth Mountain are the Sawtooth Trail, which climbs up and skirts the upper west side of Sawtooth Mountain; and Wood Lake Trail, which descends west from the Pacific Crest Trail to the deep blue Wood Lake. The Pacific Crest Trail skirts the densely forested lower west side of the peak.

The Sawtooth Berry Fields is located north of Sawtooth Mountain, around Surprise Lakes and the Sawtooth Trailhead for the Pacific Crest Trail.

== See also ==
- Cascade Volcanoes
- List of volcanoes in the United States of America
- Indian Heaven Wilderness
- Indian Heaven
