= Lemei Rock =

Mountain in Skamania County, Washington

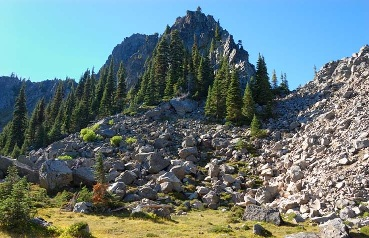
- Lemei Rock in the Indian Heaven volcanic field

Highest point
- Elevation: 5,925 ft (1,806 m)
- Prominence: 2405 ft (733 m)
- Coordinates: 46°1′N 121°46′W

Geography
- Location: Skamania County, Washington, U.S.
- Parent range: Cascade Range
- Topo map: Lone Butte O46121a7 1:24,000

Geology
- Rock age(s): Pleistocene and Holocene
- Mountain type: shield volcano
- Volcanic arc: Cascade Volcanic Arc
- Volcanic field: Indian Heaven
- Last eruption: 8,200 years ago

Climbing
- Easiest route: Lemei Trail, Indian Heaven Trail, with rock scrambling

Lemei Rock is a shield volcano, and part of the Indian Heaven polygenetic volcanic field in Washington, United States. It is located midway between Mount St. Helens and Mount Adams, and dates from the Pleistocene and Holocene. Lemei Rock is the highest point at 5,925 feet (1,806 m).

== Geographical setting ==
Lemei Rock is the highest peak within the Indian Heaven Wilderness in Washington. Lemei Rock has a topographic prominence of 2,405 feet (733 m). On clear days hikers can see views of four nearby volcanoes: Mount Adams, Mount Hood, Mount St. Helens, and Mount Rainier. The shield volcano is topped by a volcanic crater. While the crater rim is free of snow and ice, snow tends to linger on the summit well into July. A small crater lake by the name of Lake Wapiki, occupies the crater below the Lemei Rock high point. The Lost and Dry Creeks flow off of the southeast side of Lemei Rock and join the White Salmon River, while the Smokey, Little Goose, and Cultus flow from the east and northeast side, and joins Trout Lake Creek, which then discharges into the White Salmon River at Trout Lake. The Rush Creek flows from the west side of Lemei Rock and joins the Lewis River between the Lower Lewis River Falls Recreation Area and the Swift Reservoir.

== Geology ==
Lemei Rock is one of the many shield volcanoes topped by cinder cones and spatter cones that make up the Indian Heaven Volcanic Field. About 60 eruptive centers lie on the 19-mile (30 km) long, N10°E-trending, Indian Heaven fissure zone. The 230 square miles (600 km^{2}) field has a volume of about 20 cubic miles (100 km^{3}) and forms the western part of a 770-square-mile (2,000 km^{2}) Quaternary basalt field in the southern Washington Cascades, including the King Mountain fissure zone along which Mount Adams was built.

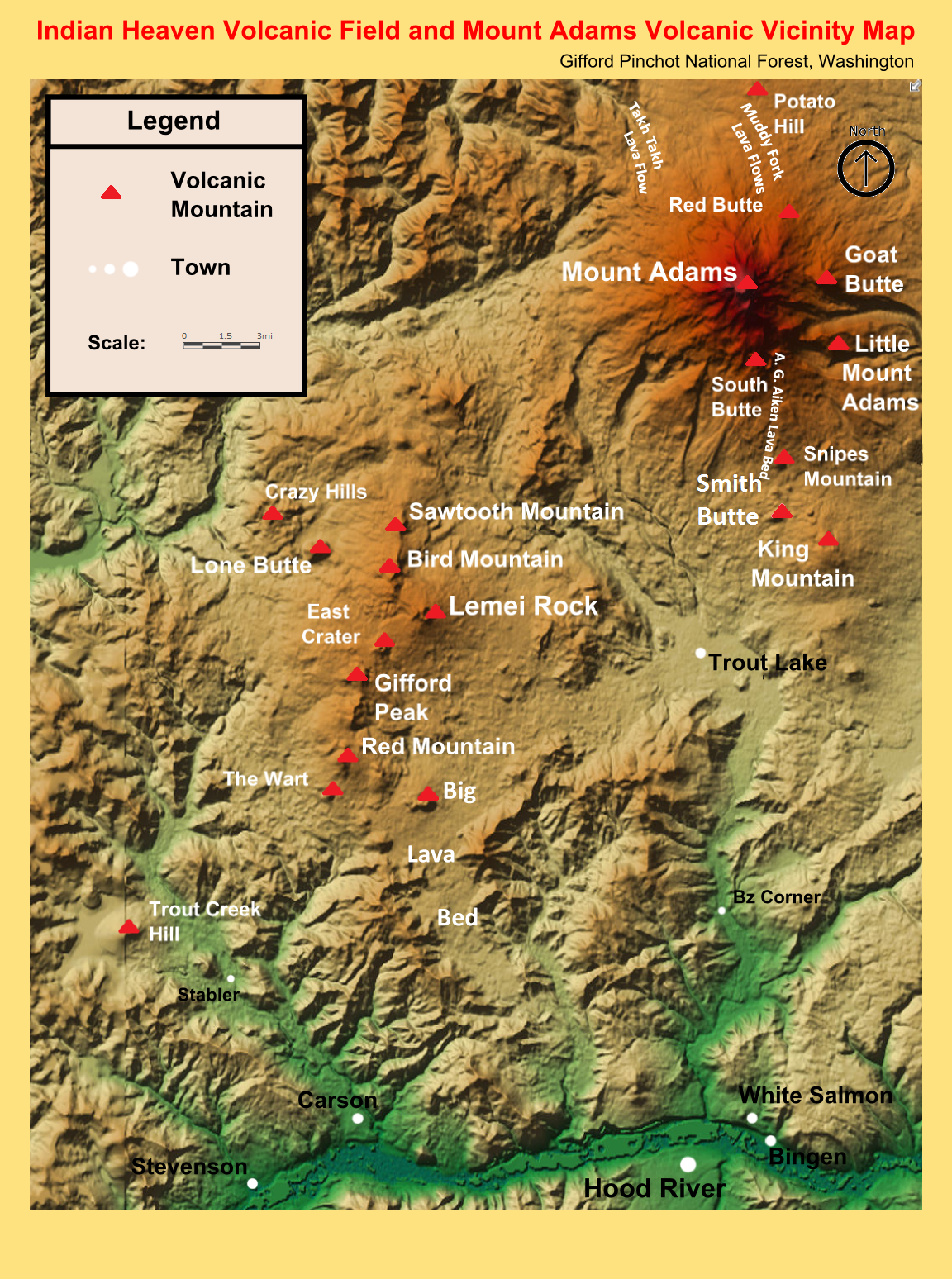
Indian Heaven Volcanic Field and Mount Adams Volcanic Vicinity Digital Relief Map showing Lemei Rock and the various other peaks that make up the volcanic field.

Name	Elevation		Location	Last eruption
Name	meters	feet	Coordinates	Last eruption
Big Lava Bed	1,278.6	4,195	45.9°N 121.75°W	~8150 years ago
Bird Mountain	5,706	1,739	46.0392°N 121.78106°W	
Crazy Hills				
East Crater	1,614	5,295	46°N 121.78°W	
Gifford Peak	1,614	5,295		
Lemei Rock	1,806	5,925	46°1′6″N 121°45′36″W	
Lone Butte	1,457	4,780	46.05°N 121.87°W	
Red Mountain	1,513	4,964	45.93°N 121.82°W	
Sawtooth Mountain	1,632	5,354	46.07°N 121.78°W	

== Climbing and recreation ==
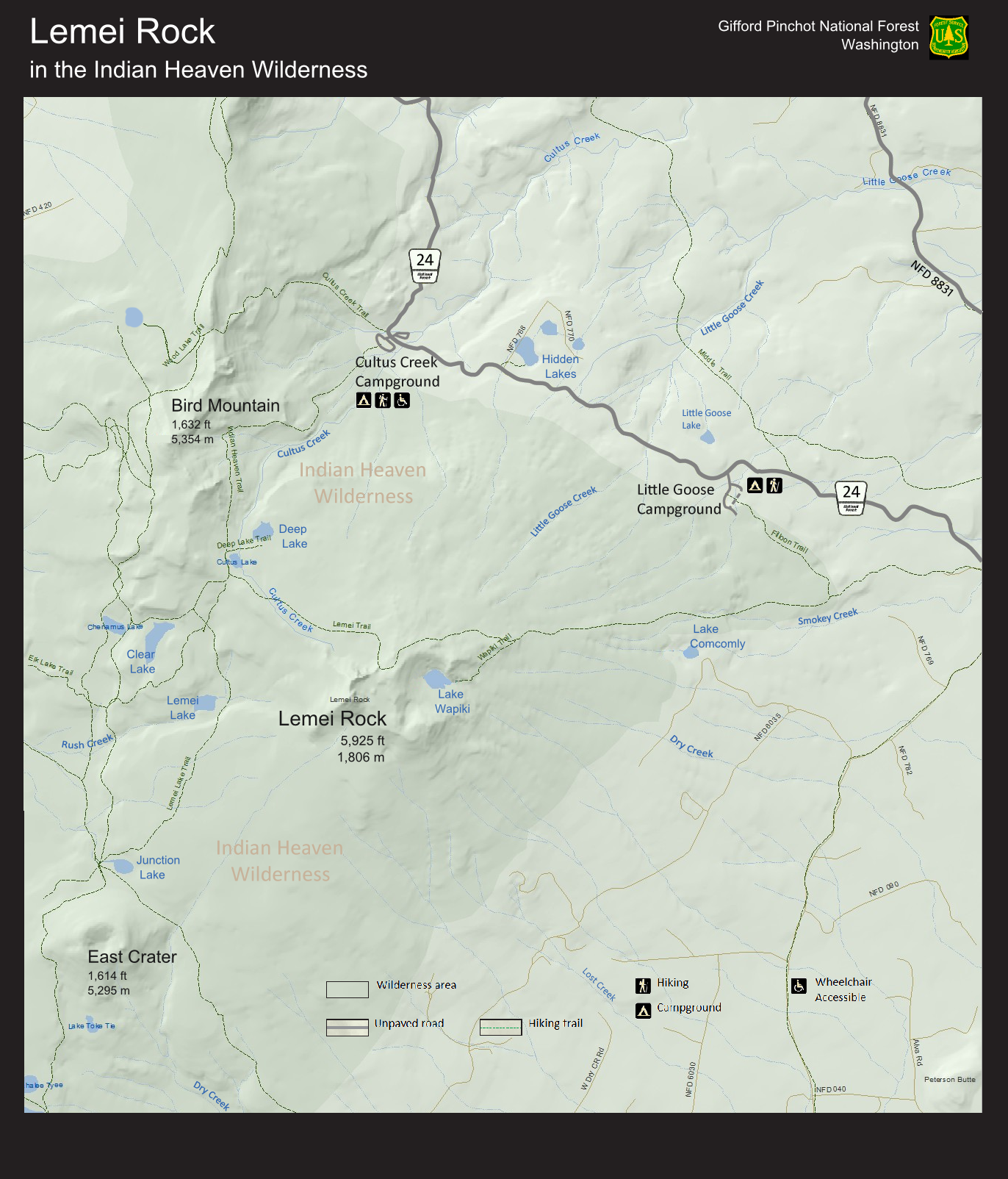
Lemei Rock in the Indian Heaven Wilderness Visitor and Location Map

Fishing and hiking destinations in the volcanic field around Lemei Rock include the Indian Heaven Wilderness, which is known for the high mountain meadows among its scattered volcanic peaks. The Pacific Crest National Scenic Trail passes north/south through the volcanic field and the Indian Heaven Wilderness, which is known for its lakes and views of four nearby volcanoes: Mount Adams, Mount Hood, Mount St. Helens, and Mount Rainier. Major trails at Lemei Rock are the Lemei Trail, which climbs up the east side of Lemei Rock; and Wapiki Trail, which descends from the Lemei Trail to the deep blue Wapiki Lake, the "crater lake" of Lemei Rock. The Filloon Trail departs from the rustic Little Goose Campground and meets up with Lemei Trail before Lake Comcomly.

The fifty-site Cultus Creek Campground, a destination for berry pickers, is located right at the edge of the Indian Heaven Wilderness. Cultus Creek Campground offers visitors two major trail heads (Indian Heaven Trail #33 and Cultus Creek Trail #108) and huckleberry picking access to the Indian Heaven Wilderness, known for its huckleberries, and the volcanic field in which it resides.

== See also ==
- Cascade Volcanoes
- List of volcanoes in the United States
- Indian Heaven Wilderness
- Indian Heaven
