= Twiss =

Twiss is a surname, and may refer to:

- Edith Minot Twiss (1873–1925), American botanist
- Sir Frank Twiss (1910–1994), Royal Navy admiral
- Horace Twiss (1787–1849), English writer and politician
- Ian Twiss, Irish footballer
- Michael Twiss (born 1977), English footballer
- Peter Twiss (1921–2011), British test pilot
- Phil Twiss, Australian politician
- Richard Twiss (1954–2013), Native American educator and author, co-founder and president of Wiconi International
- Richard Twiss (footballer) (1909–1970), English footballer
- Richard Twiss (writer) (1747–1821), English writer on travel and chess
- Richard Q. Twiss (1920–2005), British scientist
- Sumner Twiss, American academic
- Tilly Devine (née Twiss, 1900–1970), Australian criminal
- Sir Travers Twiss (1809–1897), English jurist
- William Twiss (1745–1827), British army general

== See also ==
- Twisse
- Mount Twiss, Antarctica
- Mount Twiss, Australia
- River Twiss in Yorkshire, England
- Twiss County, Western Australia
- Twiss parameters (accelerator physics)
