= U.S. Route 97 =

North–south highway in the northwestern United States

U.S. Route 97
- US 97 highlighted in red

Route information
- Length: 669.61 mi (Note: Total length is calculated from route mileage within California (54.364 miles, 87.490 km), Oregon (293.65 miles, 472.58 km), and Washington (321.60 miles, 517.57 km).) (1,077.63 km)
- Existed: 1926–present

Major junctions
- South end: I-5 in Weed, CA
- US 20 in Bend, OR; US 26 in Madras, OR; US 197 at Shaniko Junction; I-84 / US 30 in Biggs Junction, OR; I-82 / US 12 near Yakima, WA; I-90 in Ellensburg, WA; US 2 in Cashmere, WA
- North end: Highway 97 at the Canadian border near Oroville, WA

Location
- Country: United States
- States: California, Oregon, Washington

Highway system
- United States Numbered Highway System; List; Special; Divided
← US 96	→ US 98

U.S. Route 97 (US 97) is a major north–south route of the United States Numbered Highway System in the Pacific Northwest region. It runs for approximately 670 miles (1,078 km) through the states of California, Oregon, and Washington, primarily serving interior areas on the east side of the Cascade Mountains. The highway terminates to the south at a junction with Interstate 5 (I-5) in Weed, California, and to the north at the Canadian border near Osoyoos, British Columbia, where it becomes British Columbia Highway 97. Major cities on the US 97 corridor include Klamath Falls, Bend, and Redmond in Oregon; and Yakima, Ellensburg, and Wenatchee in Washington. A portion of the highway in California and Oregon is part of the Volcanic Legacy Scenic Byway.

The highway was designated in 1926 as part of the original United States Numbered Highway System, replacing a set of routes designated by the state governments of Oregon and Washington. US 97 was extended into California in the 1930s and realigned several times in the 20th and 21st centuries.

== Route description ==
Lengths
	mi	km
CA	54.36	87.48
OR	293.65	472.58
WA	321.6	517.6
Total	669.61	1,077.63

=== California ===
US 97 begins at an interchange with I-5 in Weed, California, near Mount Shasta at the northern edge of the state. The highway travels northeast around Weed and into Shasta–Trinity National Forest, passing several lava fields as it ascends the northwest side of Mount Shasta. It turns east at Haystack Butte and travels around Deer Mountain, crossing the shore of Grass Lake and serving a rest area. After another series of turns, US 97 reaches its highest point in California at Mount Hebron Summit, 5,202 feet (1,586 m) above mean sea level.

The highway descends from Mount Hebron and leaves the national forest to travel northeast across the Butte Valley, a rural area with few settlements. After passing through the town of Macdoel, US 97 bisects a portion of the Butte Valley National Grassland and passes through a border inspection station operated by the California Department of Food and Agriculture near Dorris. The highway passes through Dorris on a series of city streets and continues northeast to cross into Oregon near a junction with California State Route 161 northwest of Indian Tom Lake. The California portion of US 97 is approximately 55 miles (89 km) long and lies entirely within Siskiyou County. It is also part of the Volcanic Legacy Scenic Byway system, which continues south from Weed towards Lassen Peak.

=== Oregon ===
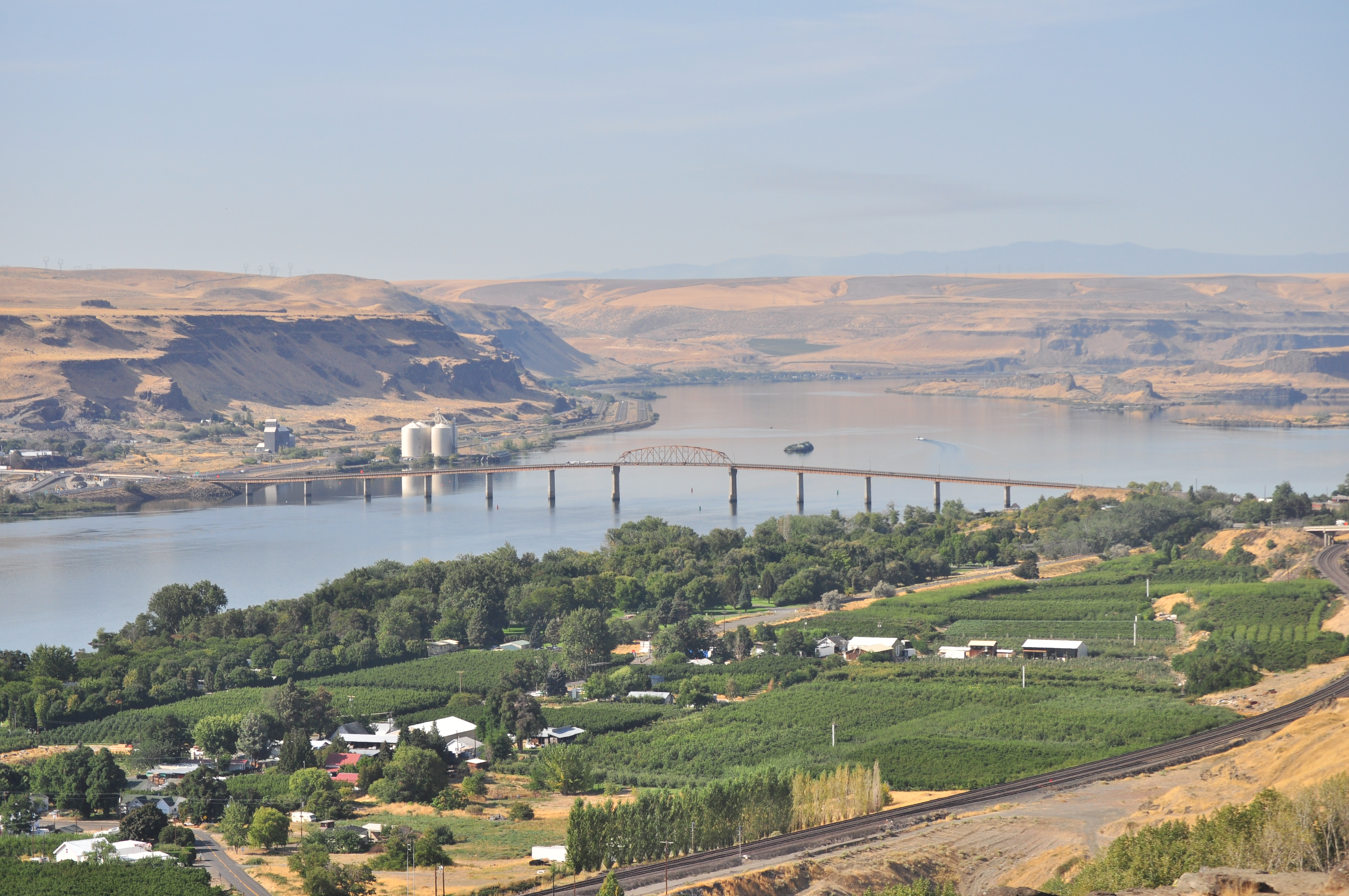
The Sam Hill Memorial Bridge, which carries US 97 from Oregon to Washington over the Columbia River

US 97 travels northeast along the Klamath River from the California state line to Klamath Falls. It bypasses the city to the west on an expressway and has a business route to serve downtown Klamath Falls. The highway continues north, first along the east shore of Upper Klamath Lake and later to the east of Crater Lake, through the dry forests of the eastern Cascade Mountains. US 97 is directly connected to Crater Lake National Park via Oregon Route 62 and Oregon Route 138.

The highway travels northeast, following the Deschutes River through La Pine and to the Newberry National Volcanic Monument, where it passes over the Lava River Cave and travels around Lava Butte. US 97 expands into an expressway near the butte and turns north as it approaches Bend, the largest city in Central Oregon. The highway travels through Bend on the Bend Parkway, a four-lane expressway bypass that is supplemented by a parallel business route to the east. The business route is also used by US 20, which US 97 intersects twice north of downtown Bend.

US 97 continues northeast from Bend as a divided highway through Redmond, where it reverts to a two-lane highway. It travels north across the Crooked River National Grassland to Madras, where the highway is concurrent with US 26 and splits into a pair of one-way streets. US 97 continues northeast from Madras through a series of canyons to a junction with US 197, its sole auxiliary route. The two highways travel parallel to each other on opposite sides of the Deschutes River canyon, with US 197 to the west serving The Dalles and US 97 to the east passing through the sparsely populated area between Shaniko and Wasco. From Wasco, the highway turns northwest to descend to the Columbia River Gorge, intersecting I-84 and US 30 at Biggs Junction. Immediately after the interchange, US 97 crosses the Sam Hill Memorial Bridge into Washington.

Under Oregon's named highway system, US 97 is designated as part of The Dalles–California Highway No. 4 between California and US 197 and Sherman Highway No. 42 from US 197 to the Columbia River. It is described as Oregon's most important highway east of the Cascades and serves as an alternate trucking route to the I-5 corridor. The southernmost section between the California state line and Klamath Falls is part of the Volcanic Legacy Scenic Byway, which continues to Crater Lake; the northernmost section between Shaniko and Biggs Junction is part of the Journey Through Time Scenic Byway, which continues east through John Day Fossil Beds National Monument.

=== Washington ===
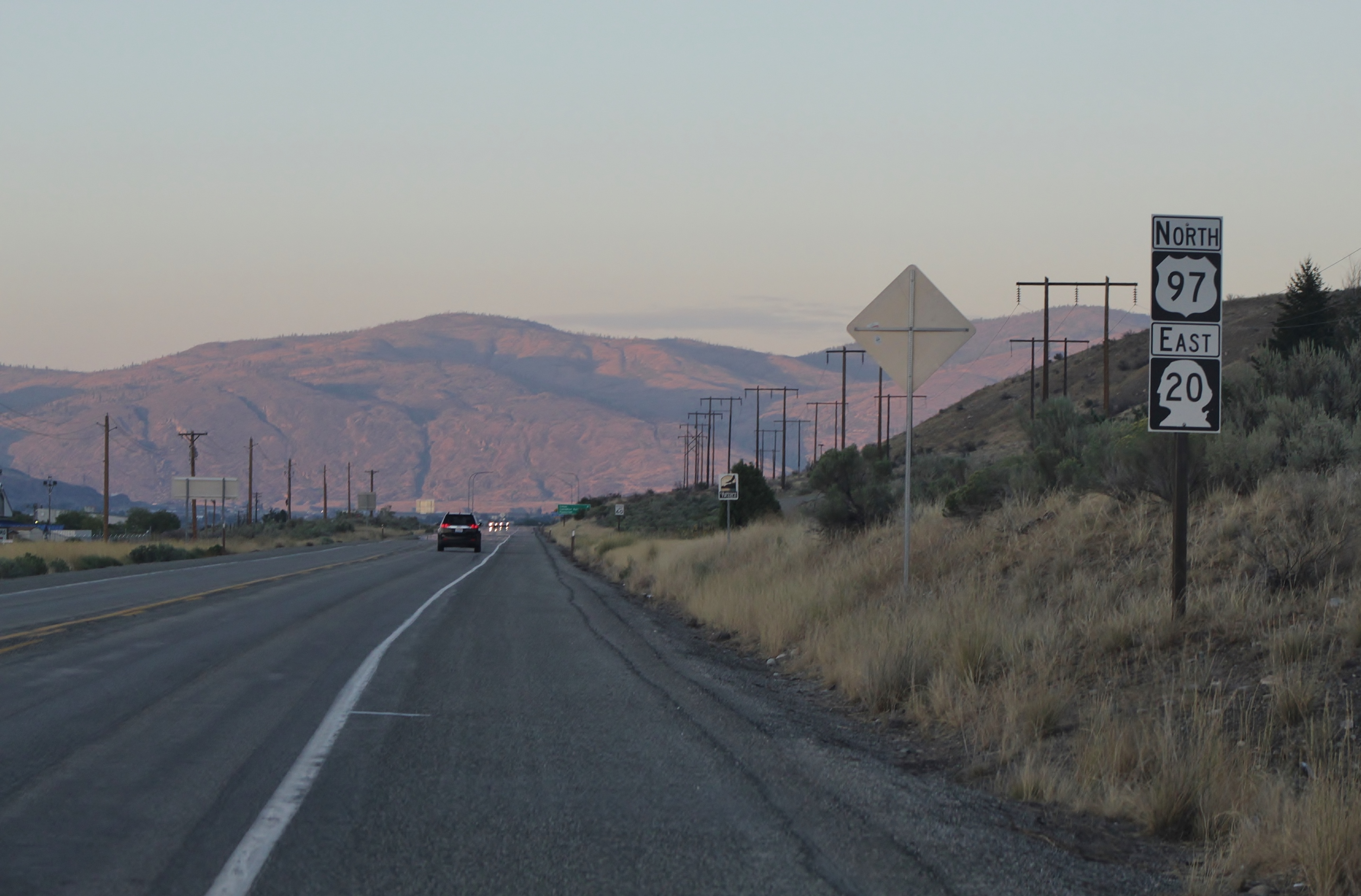
US 97 and SR 20 near Okanogan, Washington

The highway enters Washington at Maryhill, a community on the north side of the Columbia River that is home to a state park and Stonehenge replica. US 97 climbs from the river and briefly turns west on State Route 14 (SR 14) before continuing north over the Columbia Hills. The highway passes Goldendale and Goldendale Observatory State Park before turning northeast to cross the Simcoe Mountains via Satus Pass, located 3,107 feet (947 m) above sea level.

US 97 then traverses part of the Yakama Indian Reservation with shrub–steppe land that lies between the Simcoe Mountains and Toppenish Ridge. After crossing the latter, the highway descends into the Yakima Valley, passing through farmland and vineyards. US 97 then turns northwest at a junction with SR 22 in Toppenish and travels through Wapato before leaving the Yakima Indian Reservation and merging with I-82 and US 12 at Union Gap.

Now part of the freeway, US 97 runs north along the Yakima River through Union Gap and neighboring Yakima, where US 12 splits. The freeway then travels northeast over the Umtanum and Manastash ridges to reach the Kittitas Valley. I-82 ends in Ellensburg at a junction with I-90, which US 97 follows for 4 miles (6 km) before splitting off to the north and reverting to a two-lane road. The highway continues north into the Wenatchee Mountains (part of the Cascades) in Wenatchee National Forest and crosses Blewett Pass at 4,102 feet (1,250 m) above sea level. US 97 joins US 2 near Peshastin, traveling southeast on a divided highway along the Wenatchee River to the Wenatchee area.

The highway bypasses Wenatchee and crosses the Columbia River on the Richard Odabashian Bridge before turning north onto a two-lane road at a junction with SR 28. US 2 and US 97 travel along the east bank of the Columbia River, opposite US 97 Alternate on the west side, to Orondo, where US 2 turns east. US 97 continues north and east along the river to Chelan Falls, where it crosses the Beebe Bridge and is rejoined by the alternate route near Chelan. The highway follows the west bank of the Columbia River to Brewster, where it turns north to continue along the Okanogan River. US 97 then becomes concurrent with SR 20 for 28 miles (45 km) as they bypass Okanogan and Omak and continue through the Okanogan Highlands. SR 20 turns east at Tonasket while US 97 continues north to the Canadian border near Oroville and Osoyoos, where it terminates and becomes British Columbia Highway 97 (BC 97). BC 97 continues through the British Columbia Interior and terminates at the Yukon border, eventually becoming part of the Alaska Highway.

== History ==
US 97 was established as part of the initial United States Numbered Highway System, adopted by the American Association of State Highway Officials (AASHO) on November 11, 1926. It ran north from US 99 near Ashland, Oregon, to the Canadian border near Oroville, Washington, generally following the California-Banff Bee-Line (an early auto trail) through Oregon. The highway also used existing state roads that were designated in the 1910s by the Oregon and Washington governments, which had been partially paved. US 97 was extended south from Klamath Falls to Weed in 1935. During World War II, US 97 formed the eastern boundary of a restricted military zone for Washington and Oregon created in March 1942 ahead of the mass internment of Japanese Americans.

The state of Washington built several bridges on the Columbia River in the 1960s to replace existing ferry crossings, including two on US 97. The Sam Hill Memorial Bridge opened in 1962 to connect Biggs Junction, Oregon, with Maryhill, Washington, and operated as a toll bridge until 1975. The Beebe Bridge opened near Chelan in 1963, replacing a one-lane bridge, and was incorporated into US 97 with a realignment on the east side of the river that was approved in 1988. The relocation also resulted in the creation of US 97 Alternate on the old route to the west of the Columbia River between Wenatchee and Chelan. The highway was also relocated in some areas to accommodate the construction of dams on the Columbia River, including the Rocky Reach Dam near Wenatchee.

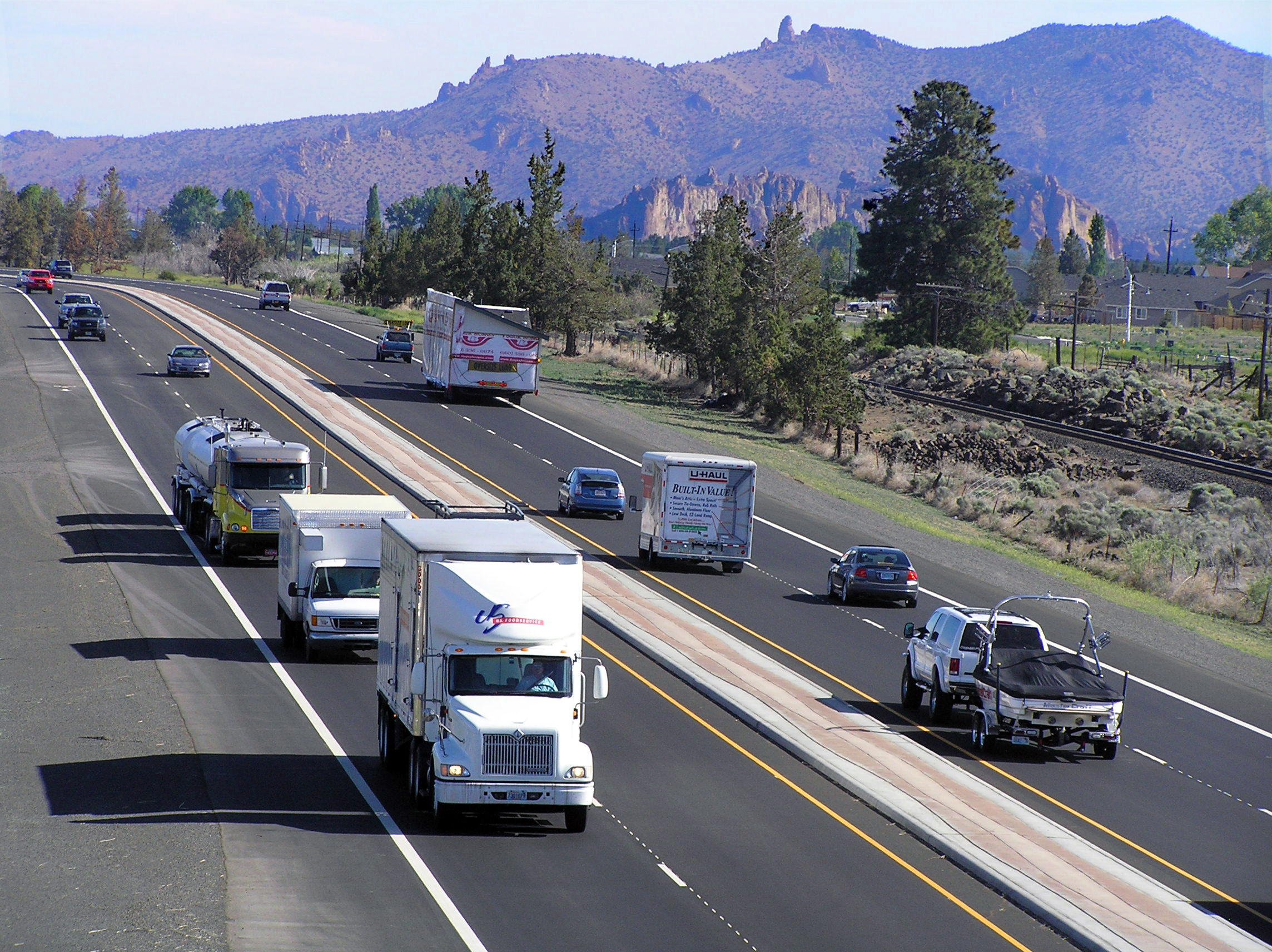
US 97 was rerouted around downtown Redmond, Oregon, in 2008

Several sections of the highway were also replaced with expressways or other limited-access roads bypassing city centers beginning in the 1950s. US 97 was relocated onto the Klamath Falls bypass when it opened in November 1959; the section cost $1.8 million to construct. US 97 was relocated onto an arterial street east of Bend in 1962, bypassing a congested section through downtown. The Okanogan and Omak sections were bypassed to the east by a new highway that opened in 1964. US 97 was relocated onto I-82 between Union Gap and Ellensburg when the freeway opened in 1971, bypassing downtown Yakima and the Yakima Canyon Highway (which became State Route 821).

A new route for US 97 through Bend, named the Bend Parkway, was proposed in the 1980s and opened in September 2001, relocating 7.2 miles (11.6 km) of the highway onto an elevated expressway through the city that cost $113 million to construct. A full freeway or bypass of Bend was also considered, but they were rejected due to funding and space constraints. A bypass in Redmond was opened in April 2008 at a cost of $90 million, moving US 97 onto a limited-access road around the east side of downtown Redmond. Plans for other bypasses in La Pine and Madras, as well as four-laning the entire highway in Oregon, have been proposed but not funded by the state government. In 2013, the cost of upgrading all of US 97 to a four-lane highway with limited access was estimated to be $10 billion.

=== Proposed Alaska expansion ===
An extension of US 97 to the state of Alaska was proposed in the 1950s and 1960s to promote the corridor as a continuous international highway. The Alaska International Rail and Highway Commission lobbied for the designation of US 97 from Fairbanks, Alaska, to Mexico City in the late 1950s; they were followed by a 1960s proposal from the Okanogan Cariboo Trail Association for a longer corridor to complement the Pan-American Highway. Their proposal would also have US 97 continue west to terminate in Nome, Alaska.

AASHO formally approved the Alaska extension of US 97 in December 1964, subject to the renumbering of highways in the Yukon Territory and British Columbia to match the "97" designation. The proposed extension would have followed Alaska Route 2 (AK-2) from the Yukon border to Fairbanks, terminating at a junction with AK-3. British Columbia had already renumbered its section to Highway 97, but the Yukon Territory declined a request from the Alaska Department of Highways to renumber Yukon Highway 1.

== Major intersections ==
California
I-5 in Weed
Oregon
OR 140 near Klamath Falls
US 20 in Bend
OR 126 in Redmond
US 26 in Madras; joined for approximately 2 miles (3 km)
US 197 near Shaniko
I-84 / US 30 at Biggs Junction
Washington
SR 14 in Maryhill; joined for approximately 1 mile (2 km)
SR 22 in Toppenish
I-82 / US 12 near Union Gap; joined with US 12 for approximately 7 miles (11 km) until Yakima and with I-82 for approximately 38 miles (61 km) until Ellensburg
US 12 in Yakima
I-82 / I-90 near Ellensburg; joined with I-90 for approximately 5 miles (8 km)
US 2 near Peshastin; joined for approximately 29 miles (47 km) until Orondo
US 97 Alt. near Wenatchee
SR 28 near East Wenatchee
US 97 Alt. near Chelan
SR 20 near Okanogan; joined for approximately 29 miles (47 km) until Tonasket
Highway 97 at the Canada–US border near Oroville
