= Indian Heaven Wilderness =

Wilderness area in southwest Washington, United States

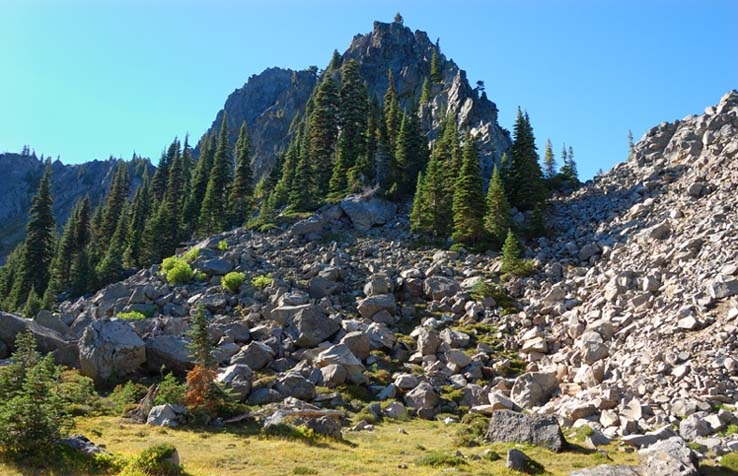
- Lemei Rock, highest peak in Indian Heaven Wilderness

- Location within the United States
- Location: Skamania County, Washington, USA
- Coordinates: 46°00′34″N 121°46′56″W
- Area: 20,782 acres (8,410 ha)
- Established: 1984
- Governing body: United States Forest Service
- Website: Indian Heaven Wilderness

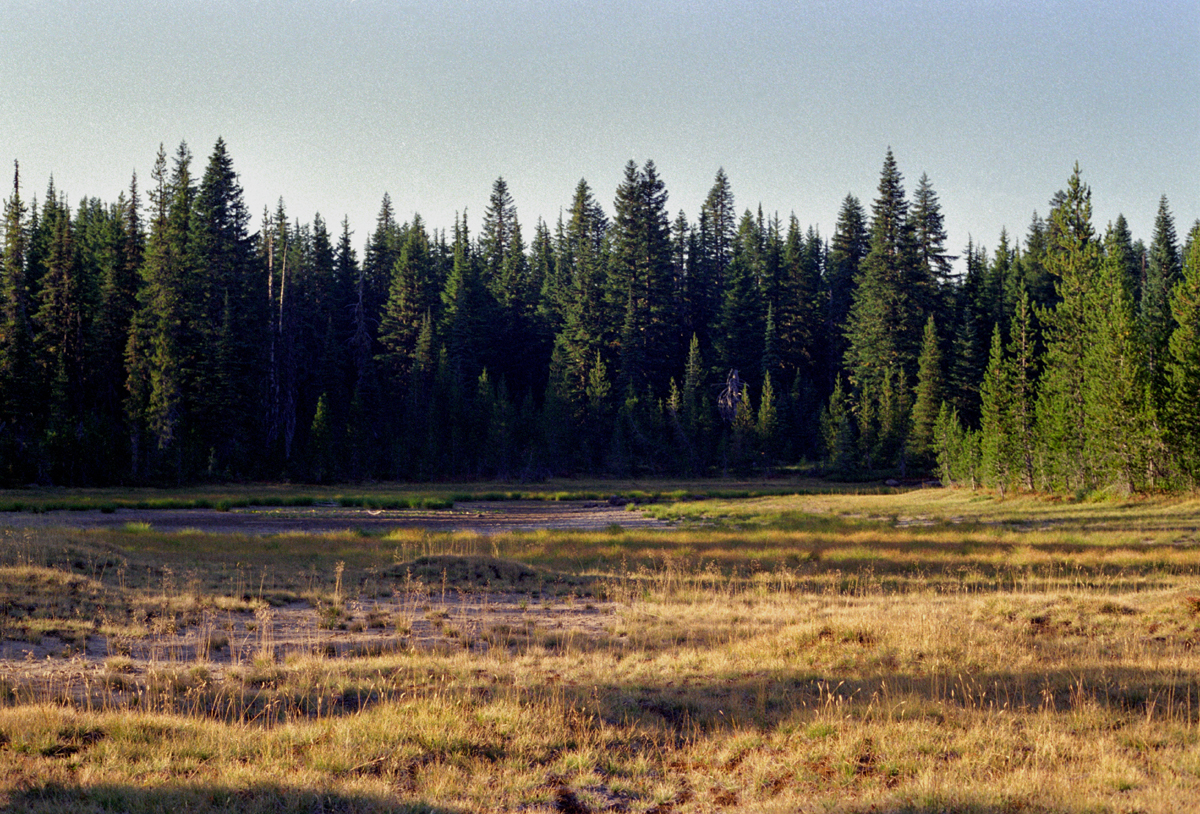
Ancient Indian racetrack at Indian Heaven

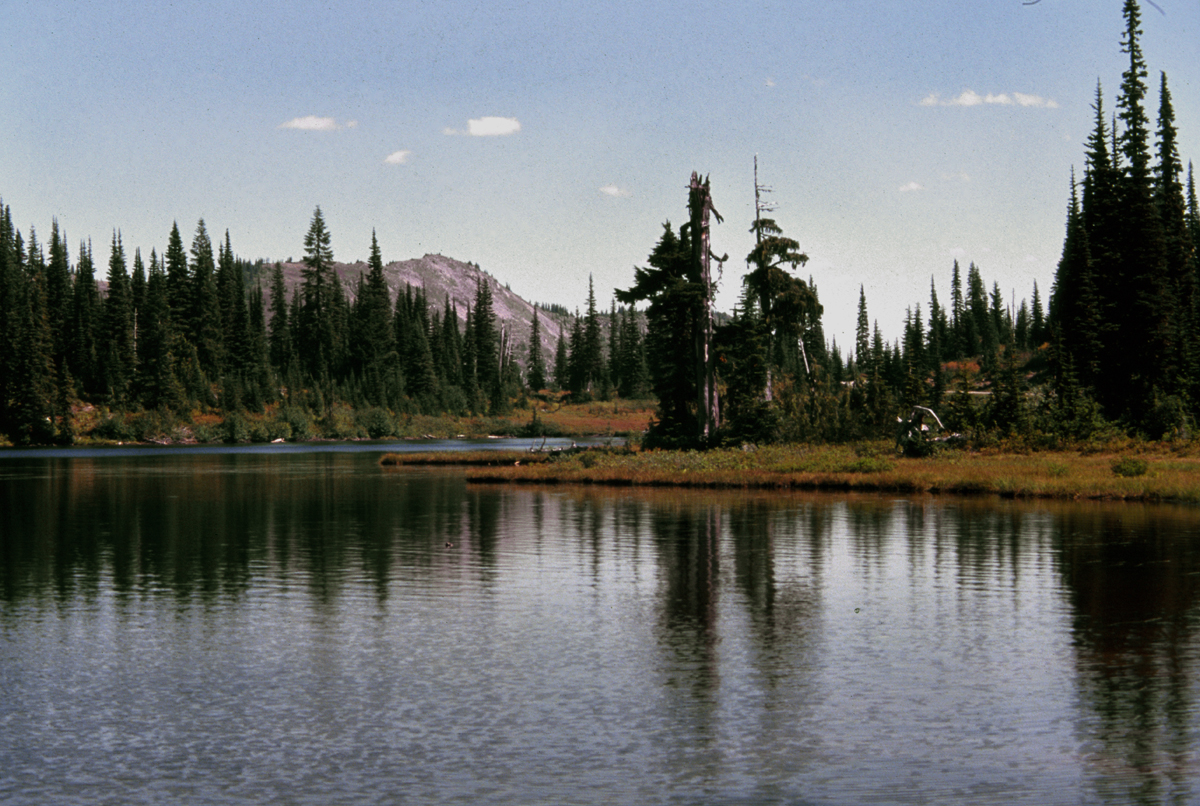
One of the Race Track Lakes near the Indian racetrack

Indian Heaven Wilderness is a protected area located inside the Gifford Pinchot National Forest of southwestern Washington state. The wilderness consists of 20,782 acres (8,410 ha) of broad, forested plateau, with meadows straddling numerous volcanic peaks and at least 150 small lakes, ponds, and marshes. The wilderness also contains the Indian Heaven volcanic field. Originally known to the Indians as "Sahalee Tyee," the area has been and remains culturally important to Native Americans. During the past 9,000 years, the Yakama, Klickitat, Cascades, Wasco, Wishram, and Umatilla tribes gathered in this area for berry picking, fishing, and hunting.

== Landforms ==
Lava once flowed from the numerous volcanic cones that rise above the plateau, consisting mainly of overlapping shield volcanoes, spatter cones, and cinder cones, which averages 4,500 feet (1,400 m) in elevation. The wilderness' highest point is Lemei Rock (5,927 ft), whose crater now contains Lake Wapiki. Other prominent volcanic peaks include Bird Mountain, Sawtooth Mountain, Gifford Peak, East Crater, and Red Mountain. Big Lava Bed is the result of the most recent volcanic activity about 8,200 years ago.

=== Geology ===
Lemei Rock is one of the many shield volcanoes topped by cinder cones and spatter cones that make up the Indian Heaven volcanic field. About 60 eruptive centers lie on the 19-mile (30 km) long, N10°E-trending, Indian Heaven fissure zone. The 230 square miles (600 km^{2}) field has a volume of about 20 cubic miles (100 km^{3}) and forms the western part of a 770-square-mile (2,000 km^{2}) Quaternary basalt field in the southern Washington Cascades, including the King Mountain fissure zone along which Mount Adams was built.

Name	Elevation		Location	Last eruption
Name	meters	feet	Coordinates	Last eruption
Big Lava Bed	1,278.6	4,195	45.9°N 121.75°W	~8150 years ago
Bird Mountain	1,632	5,354	46.03°N 121.78°W	~8,200 years ago
Crazy Hills				
East Crater	1,614	5,295	46°N 121.78°W	~8,200 years ago
Gifford Peak	1,614	5,295		~8,200 years ago
Lemei Rock	1,806	5,925	46°1′6″N 121°45′36″W	~8,200 years ago
Lone Butte	1,457	4,780	46.05°N 121.87°W	~8,200 years ago
Red Mountain	1,513	4,964	45.93°N 121.82°W	~8,200 years ago
Sawtooth Mountain	1,632	5,354	46.07°N 121.78°W	~8,200 years ago

== Wildlife ==
=== Fauna ===
Deer and elk reside in the wilderness area until winter snows drive them lower, along with black bears attracted to the abundant ripening of fall huckleberries. Numerous bird species reside in the wilderness along with various small forest animals, such as chipmunks.

=== Flora ===
The forest conifers consist mainly of subalpine fir and Douglas fir. The area (including the Sawtooth Berry Fields) is known for its abundant huckleberries in mid-August to early September. They grow abundantly in the old, fire-scarred forest meadows burned in the past by Natives to stimulate more huckleberry production.

== Recreation ==
The Pacific Crest National Scenic Trail passes north/south through the wilderness, which is known for its many lakes and views of four nearby volcanoes: Mount Adams, Mount Hood, Mount St. Helens, and Mount Rainier. It is also known to hikers for an intense population of mosquitoes throughout the summer. Other major trails in the area are Indian Heaven Trail and the Cultus Creek Trail, which climbs up the east side of Bird Mountain, and Lemei Trail which traverses up the east side of Lemei Rock and passes by Lake Wapiki. In late fall, the huckleberry bushes provide berries, as well as intense fall colors in the foliage.

In 2015, nearly 8,000 people visited the wilderness area for recreational purposes, exceeding the Forest Service's standards for solitude.
