= Lamb Peak =

Mountain in Antarctica

Lamb Peak (79°34′S 84°57′W) is a conspicuous bare rock peak located 2 nautical miles (4 km) south-southeast of Maagoe Peak in the Gifford Peaks of the Heritage Range, Ellsworth Mountains, Antarctica. It was mapped by the United States Geological Survey from surveys and U.S. Navy air photos from 1961 to 1966, and was named by the Advisory Committee on Antarctic Names for Lieutenant Commander Arthur D. Lamb, who contributed to the success of austral summer resupply activities for three seasons in his capacity as operations and communications officer through U.S. Navy Operation Deep Freeze 1966.

== See also ==
- Mountains in Antarctica
