= Indian Heaven =

Volcanic field in United States of America

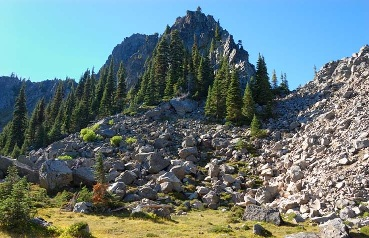
- Lemei Rock in the Indian Heaven volcanic field

Highest point
- Elevation: 5,925 ft (1,806 m)
- Coordinates: 45°56′00″N 121°49′00″W

Geography
- Location within Washington (state)
- Location: Skamania County, Washington, U.S.
- Parent range: Cascade Range

Geology
- Rock age(s): Pleistocene and Holocene
- Mountain type: volcanic field
- Volcanic arc: Cascade Volcanic Arc
- Last eruption: 6250 BCE

Climbing
- Easiest route: Lemei Trail, Indian Heaven Trail, with rock scrambling

Indian Heaven is a volcanic field in Skamania County in the state of Washington, in the United States. Midway between Mount St. Helens and Mount Adams, the field dates from the Pleistocene to the early Holocene epoch. It trends north to south and is dominated by six small shield volcanoes; these shields are topped by small spatter and cinder cones, and the field includes a number of subglacial volcanoes and tuyas. The northernmost peak in the field is Sawtooth Mountain and the southernmost is Red Mountain; its highest point is Lemei Rock at an elevation of 5,925 feet (1,806 m).

Indian Heaven features both polygenetic and monogenetic volcanic activity; many of its volcanoes have only erupted once before coming extinct, while others have erupted several times. Approximately 50 eruptive centers lie within the Indian Heaven field, which also has approximately 40 lava flows. The field's eruptive output totals 14 to 19 cubic miles (58 to 79 km^{3}), with sporadic activity taking place for the past 700,000 years. The last volcanic activity in the field produced a large cinder cone, Big Lava Bed, as well as a voluminous lava and scoria flows about 9,000 years ago. Future activity is possible, though the Volcano Hazards Program directed by the United States Geological Survey considers Indian Heaven's volcanic threat level to be low.

The volcanic field is surrounded by the Indian Heaven Wilderness, a protected wilderness area within the Gifford Pinchot National Forest, supporting diverse flora and fauna. The local area has been inhabited by Native American populations for about 10,000 years, and the name Indian Heaven derives from the indigenous name for the vicinity. A popular recreation destination, the wilderness offers a number of trails, as well as more than 150 lakes for fishing, swimming, and boating.

== Geography ==
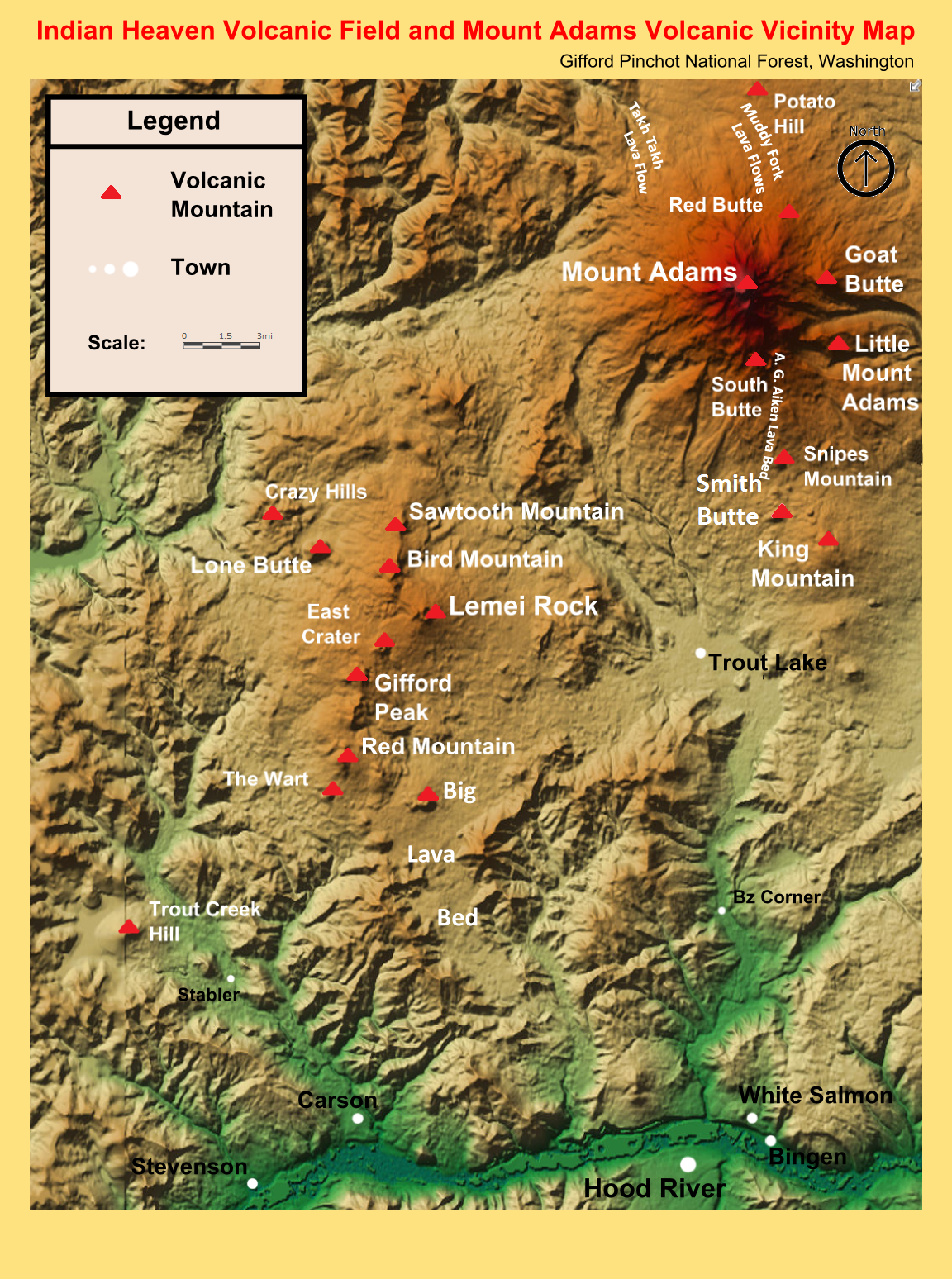
Indian Heaven volcanic field and Mount Adams shown in a relief map

Located in Skamania County in the state of Washington, Indian Heaven volcanic field is part of the High Cascades, an eastern segment of the Cascade Range, which trends north–south. Formed towards the end of the Pleistocene Epoch, these mountains are underlain by more ancient volcanoes that subsided due to parallel north–south faulting in the surrounding region. The Indian Heaven field lies 40 miles (64 km) east of Vancouver, Washington and 14 miles (23 km) to the north of the Columbia River.

The Indian Heaven volcanic field lies between Mount St. Helens and Mount Adams, about 19 miles (30 km) southwest of the latter. The Simcoe Mountains volcanic field is located to the east. To the southwest lies a diffuse volcanic belt of at least 22 volcanic centers, 25 miles (40 km) in length, that runs in a southeast-trending direction and includes Marble Mountain, Bare Mountain, West Crater, and Trout Creek Hill. The field has a diameter of 20 miles (32 km), with a total area of 175 square miles (450 km^{2}). The tallest point within the field is the Lemei Rock shield volcano, which reaches an elevation of 5,925 feet (1,806 m).

=== Wilderness ===
The Indian Heaven Wilderness, which encompasses an area of 20,784 acres (84.11 km^{2}),^{[b]} lies within a forested high plateau region. It includes subalpine meadows, the volcanic field and a number of other volcanic features, more than 150 lakes, and forests. Created in 1984 by the Washington Wilderness Bill, it sits between Mount Adams and the Columbia River Gorge, a canyon of the Columbia River. Part of the Gifford Pinchot National Forest, the wilderness area includes 16.4 miles (26.4 km) of the Pacific Crest Trail, which traverses it from north to south, as well as seven other tributary trails, that form a 42-mile (68 km) network of trails. The area is relatively inaccessible, as roads are covered by snow until June annually though snow melts by mid-July in most years, permitting visitors in the fall season.

== Ecology ==
The plateau that contains the Indian Heaven Wilderness features forests, which are predominantly made up of Pacific silver fir, noble fir, and subalpine fir trees, though there are also Western red cedars, mountain hemlock, grand firs, and Engelmann spruce. Other flora found in the vicinity include an understory of huckleberry plants and beargrass, in addition to colorful wildflowers; vine maples; flowering plants such as blueberry, heather, vanilla leaf, and false hellebore; and aromatic wintergreen. Many of the area's lakes get stocked with trout species like cutthroat, rainbow, and brook trout. Amphibians such as frogs can be found in the wilderness, while terrestrial animals in the area include deer, elk, and American black bears. Because of the abundance of mosquitoes within the vicinity, Indian Heaven is sometimes informally referred to as Insect Heaven.

== Human history ==
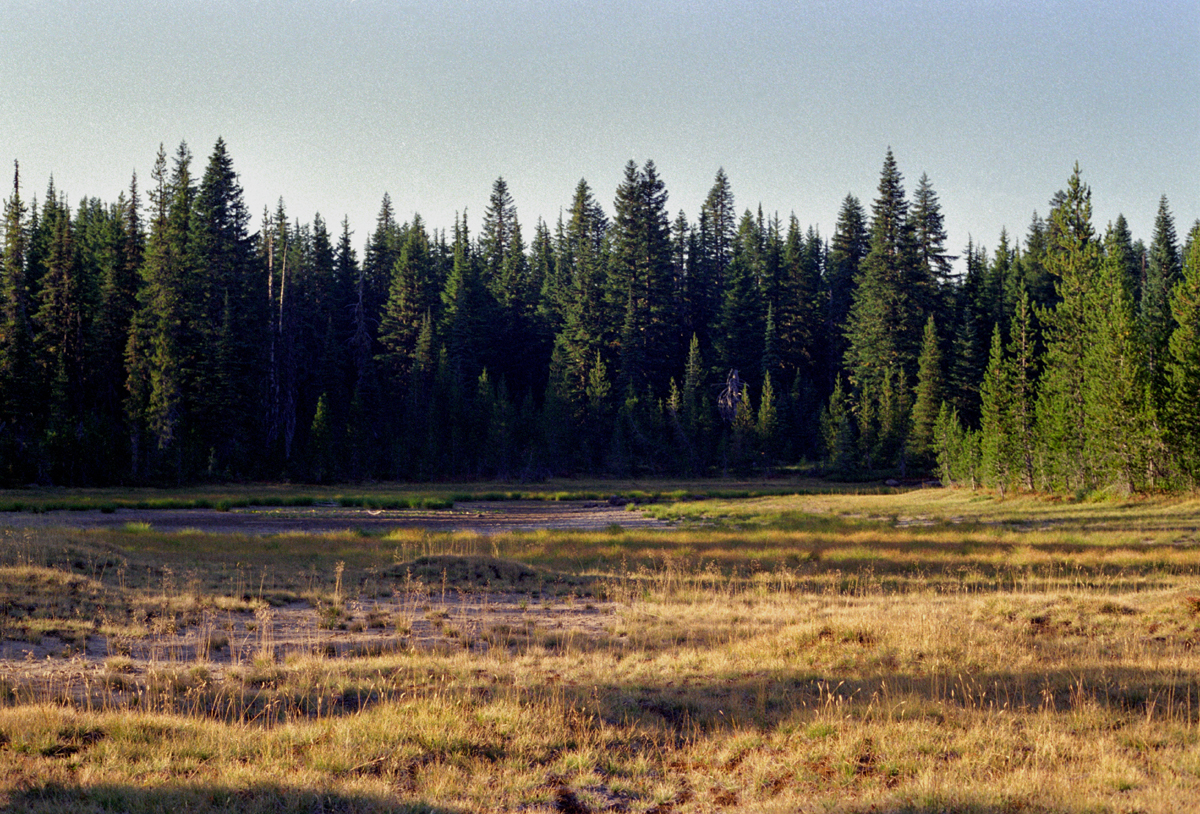
The Indian Racetrack within the Heaven Wilderness.

Indian Heaven and the surrounding wilderness area have played an important role in local Native American life for about 10,000 years. The vicinity was originally called Sahalee Tyee by native peoples, meaning "Up Above Land” or “Heaven Land,” a concept that was anglicized into “Indian Heaven”. The Sawtooth Berry Fields, known globally for their huckleberries, burned during the late 1890s and again in 1902. Later fires helped maintain the fields by drying their berries. From 1902 to the mid-1920s, local tribes including the Yakama, Klickitat, Wasco-Wishram, and Umatilla, as well as Native American groups from Montana and Wyoming gathered in the Indian Heaven area during the summers for annual huckleberry feasts. During these gatherings, they celebrated, traded, and performed rituals; they also raced horses, played various games, constructed baskets, dried meat, tanned hides, and fished in the local lakes. In 1932, the Yakama Nation and the United States Forest Service agreed to set aside a portion of the Berry Fields for exclusive Indian use; the harvest remains an important local tradition. Today, the marks from the Race Track, a meadow used by Native Americans for horse racing, can be seen about 0.5 miles (0.8 km) off the segment of the Pacific Crest Trail that crosses through the Indian Heaven wilderness. Trees within the area have scars from where their bark was peeled for wood to make baskets. The area is also rich with large game animals and supports a number of roots and tuber plant species.

== Geology ==
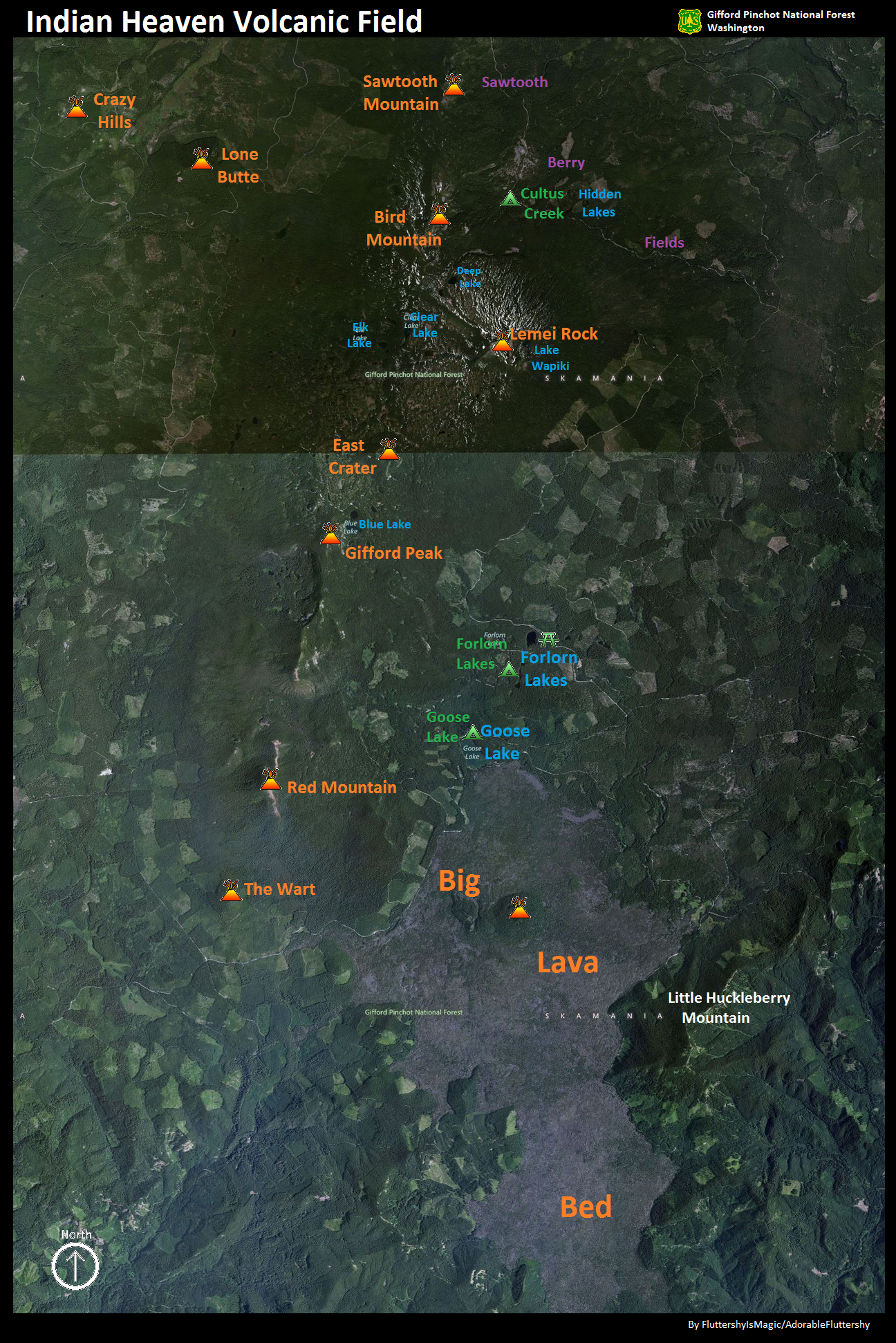
Satellite map showing the volcanoes of the Indian Heaven volcanic field

The area near the Indian Heaven vicinity is composed of Western Cascade rocks from the Eocene to Miocene including andesite, tuffs, mud flows, pyroclastic flow deposits, and other volcaniclastic materials, as well as High Cascade rocks that date from between the Pliocene and Holocene epochs. Strata of rock underlying the area has been deformed to create faults, fractures (separations in geologic formation), volcanic igneous intrusions, and a gradual, dipping syncline that trends north to south. The Indian Heaven field resides within the syncline's trough, and it consists of High Cascade rocks, which are far less altered than the surrounding rock strata. Similar to other Cascade volcanoes, the Indian Heaven volcanoes were fed by magma chambers produced by the subduction of the Juan de Fuca tectonic plate under the western edge of the North American tectonic plate. The field may share a 12–40 km (7.5–24.9 mi) deep magma chamber with Mount St. Helens that seismic imaging showed lying between the two volcanoes below two smaller magma chambers, each located more directly under their respective volcanic area.

Indian Heaven consists of several, overlapping shield volcanoes that run along a line from Sawtooth Mountain at the north to Red Mountain to the south, as well as cinder cones, lava flows, and spatter cones (low, steep-sided hills or mounds that consist of welded lava fragments). With a total magma output of 60 cubic miles (250 km^{3}), the field has about 50 mafic eruptive edifices (rich in magnesium and iron),^{[a]} whose activity lasted from the Pleistocene to the early Holocene. Roughly half of these vents mark a mountainous highland, 19 miles (31 km) in length, which runs parallel to the north–south trend of the Cascade Arc in southern Washington state.

Most of the volcanoes that comprise the Indian Heaven field are monogenetic, only erupting once before becoming extinct. The rest are polygenetic shield volcanoes. About 80 percent of the lava erupted by Indian Heaven volcanoes consists of basalt; it represents the most voluminous Quaternary basalt produced by a volcanic field in the Cascade Arc north of Newberry Volcano in Oregon, with an eruptive output volume between 14 and 19 cubic miles (60 and 80 km^{3}). Basalt composition varies from low-potassium high-alumina olivine tholeiite to calc-alkaline, shoshonite, and alkaline intraplate compositions, though olivine-bearing basalt with different amounts of porphyritic plagioclase dominates. Volcanoes within the field have produced smaller amounts of basaltic andesite and andesite with silicon dioxide compositions up to 59 percent, though dacite is not very common among Indian Heaven eruptive products. Unlike Mount St. Helens, the Indian Heaven field has generated large volumes of basalt but has not caused extensive crustal melting. Most of the lava flows produced by the field have been pāhoehoe, featuring smaller percentages of block flows and ʻaʻā flows. They vary in thickness from 1.3 to 78.7 feet (0.4 to 24 m), reaching volumes up to 0.29 cubic miles (1.2 km^{3}); there are about 40 distinct lava flow groups in the field, totaling 45 square miles (116 km^{2}) in area.

Indian Heaven has been significantly altered through glacial erosion, including at least four major periods of glaciation. During the Hayden Creek Glaciation from 190,000 to 130,000 years ago, the Lewis River glacier advanced from Mount Adams to fill the Lewis River canyon, partly overlapping the Indian Heaven volcanic field. An ice cap originating at the northern end of the field also spread during this glacial era. The Lone Butte tuya volcano erupted through this glacier, which had a thickness of 770 feet (230 m).

== Eruptive history and potential hazards ==
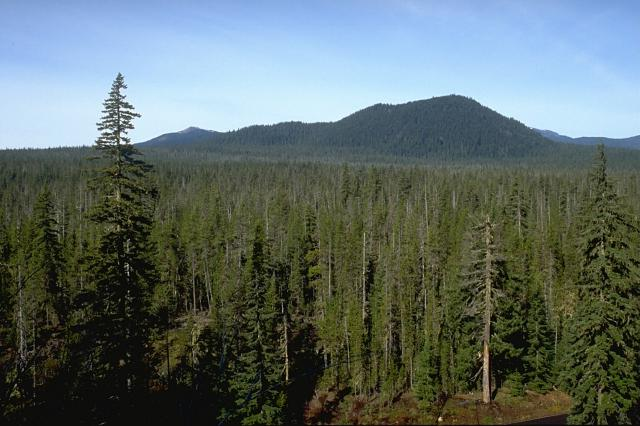
The cinder cone that produced the Big Lava Bed rises above a forest, which covers part of the extensive lava flow it produced.

One of Indian Heaven's vents produced a large effusive eruption about 9,000 years ago, forming the Big Lava Bed, which consisted of basaltic lava. With an area of 20 square miles (52 km^{2}) and a volume of 0.22 cubic miles (0.9 km^{3}), the Big Lava Bed mostly consists of unvegetated basalt. It moved to the south down the Little White Salmon River drainage, which it filled for 10 miles (16 km) of its length. Ultimately, the flow extended 16 miles (25 km) from its initial source vent, an unnamed cinder cone. It came within 5 miles (8 km) of the Columbia River. Another, more ancient lava flow that was especially fluid encompassed the Trout Lake area and extended several miles south, also nearing the Columbia River. Highly voluminous, it also features lava tubes. These lava tubes can be found at many of the lava flows that comprise the Indian Heaven volcanic field, which range from basaltic to andesitic in composition, and extend as far as 29 miles (46 km) from their source vents. The eruptive units from the field show normal residual magnetism, suggesting that they were all formed less than 780,000 years ago, with the exception of lava within Gifford Peak's eroded core.

The volcanic field also features a number of Pleistocene subglacial volcanoes, many of which formed móbergs, flat-topped peaks generated by subglacial eruptions. These mountains, such as Crazy Hills, formed pillow-like shapes when their lava interacted with ice or meltwater. The field also has tuyas, such as Lone Buttle, which formed as flat and steep volcanic cones created by lava that erupted through glaciers or ice sheets. Lone Butte in particular erupted through a glacier in the Indian Heaven field, building its upper cone above water and generating pyroclastic materials, lava flows, and tephra to reach a height of 3,300 feet (1,000 m) above its base. However, Lone Butte has since undergone significant glacial erosion, losing about half of its original structure.

Activity at the volcanic field has occurred sporadically for the past 700,000 years. Therefore, it remains likely that volcanoes from the field will erupt in the future, generating voluminous lava flows. Nonetheless, the Volcano Hazards Program directed by the United States Geological Survey lists Indian Heaven's volcanic threat level as "Low/Very Low". To assess threats from possible lava flows at Indian Heaven or at nearby Mount Adams, geologists from the United States Geological Survey headed by W. E. Scott determined its mean burial rate in 1995, calculated as the lava volume erupted per unit time divided by the area of the lava field. They found that Indian Heaven's average burial rate was low, but noted that Indian Heaven "has had a large lava flow in the past 10,000 years." Estimating the probability of lava flows from Indian Heaven covering a certain point in the zone surrounding the field, the geologists arrived at a range between one in 100,000 to one in a million.

== Major vents ==
The Global Volcanism Program of the Smithsonian Institution lists a number of major vents at Indian Heaven, including the Big Lava Bed pyroclastic cone, produced by the most recent eruption in the field; the Bird Mountain, East Crater, Gifford Peak, Lemei Rock, Red Mountain, and Sawtooth Mountain shield volcanoes; and the Lone Butte tuya volcano. The Big Lava Bed pyroclastic cinder cone has a smooth slope, and produced the Big Lava Bed flow, which represents the newest eruptive activity within the entire Indian Heaven field. Red Mountain, which has an elevation of 4,964 feet (1,513 m), marks the southernmost point of the shield volcanoes in the volcanic field, while Sawtooth Mountain is the northernmost volcano.

Name	Elevation		Location
Name	meters	feet	Coordinates
Big Lava Bed	1,278.6	4,195	45.54°N 121.45°W
Bird Mountain	1,739	5,705	46.2°N 121.47°W
East Crater	1,614	5,295	46°N 121.47°W
Lemei Rock	1,806	5,925	46.1°N 121.46°W
Lone Butte	1,457	4,780	46.3°N 121.52°W
Red Mountain	1,513	4,964	45.56°N 121.49°W
Sawtooth Mountain	1,632	5,354	46.4°N 121.47°W

== Recreation ==
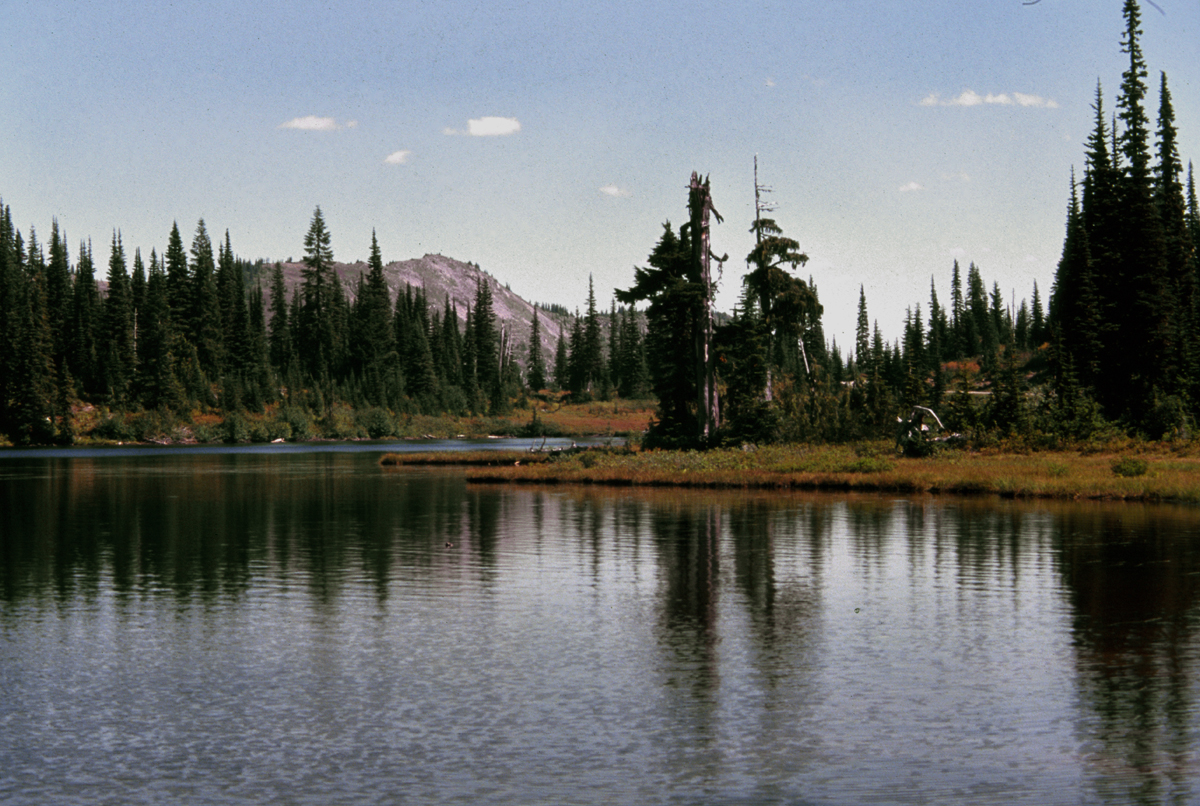
A small lake within the Indian Heaven wilderness.

Within the Indian Heaven Wilderness, visitors can fish in lakes and ponds, hike, backpack, ride horses, and view wildlife. A popular trail is the Indian Heaven loop, which runs for 10 miles (16 km) from the Cultus Creek campground. Following the Indian Heaven Trail to Deep Trail and then Lemei Lake Trail, it passes through meadows and lakes to join the Pacific Crest Trail before it returns to the Cultus Creek campground where it starts. After the climb from the final paved road to enter the wilderness area, which lasts about 2 miles (3.2 km), hiking in Indian Heaven is relatively undemanding. However, trails can vary in difficulty for horseback riders and hikers.

The Lake Wapiki trail, 9.6 miles (15.4 km) in length, gains 2,500 feet (760 m) in elevation and provides scenic views of Mount Adams and Mount Rainier. The Blue Lake trail in the Indian Heaven wilderness area runs for 3.25 miles (5.23 km); together with the Lemei Lake Trail, it forms a loop that last 12.3 miles (19.8 km). A moderate hike, it offers views of lakes, ponds, meadows, and forests, as well as access to popular fishing lakes like Dee Lake, Heather Lake, Thomas Lake, and Eunice Lake. These lakes are also popular swimming spots, particularly among hikers with children. Before it merges with the Pacific Crest Trail, the route arrives at the Blue Lake, which has a depth of 46 feet (14 m) and marks the deepest lake within the entire wilderness. Blue Lake was carved by glacial motion.

One of the most popular camping spots is the Goose Lake Campground, which is frequented by fishermen, boaters, and swimmers. Operated by the United States Forest Service, the campground remains open from July through October. A designated camp site near Thomas and Blue Lakes within the wilderness was created by wilderness managers for the Gifford Pinchot National Forest, with the hope that it would mitigate resource damage in high use area and focus visitor use impact to smaller, more compact areas.

== See also ==
- Cascade Volcanoes
- List of volcanoes in the United States
- List of volcanic fields
- Indian Heaven Wilderness

== Footnotes ==
- [a] Sources disagree on the exact number of vents; Harris (2005) says there are 48 vents, while Hildreth (2007) claims there are 52.
- [b] The United States Forest Service lists the acreage for the Indian Heaven Wilderness as both 20,784 acres (84.11 km^{2}), and as 20,600 acres (83 km^{2}).

== Sources ==
- Berger, K.; Smith, D. R. (2014). The Pacific Crest Trail: A Hiker's Companion (2 ed.). The Countryman Press.
- Bernstein, A.; Jackman, A. (2000). Portland Hikes: Day Hikes in Oregon and Washington Within 100 Miles of Portland. Mountain N' Air Books.
- Harris, S. L. (2005). "Chapter 16: Mount Adams". Fire Mountains of the West: The Cascade and Mono Lake Volcanoes (Third ed.). Missoula, Montana: Mountain Press Publishing Company. ISBN 0-87842-511-X.
- Hildreth, W. (2007). Quaternary Magmatism in the Cascades, Geologic Perspectives. United States Geological Survey. Professional Paper 1744.
- Hill, M. L., ed. (1987). Cordilleran Section of the Geological Society of America: Decade of North American Geology, Centennial Field Guide. Vol. 1. Geological Society of America.
- Joslin, L. (2005). The Wilderness Concept and the Three Sisters Wilderness: Deschutes and Willamette National Forests, Oregon. Bend, Oregon: Wilderness Associates. ISBN 978-0-9647167-4-2.
- Lorain, D. (2010). One Night Wilderness: Portland: Quick and Convenient Backcountry Getaways within Three Hours of the City. Wilderness Press.
- Mitchell, R. J.; Jaeger, D. J.; Diehl, J. F.; Hammond, P. E. (1989). "Palaeomagnetic results from the Indian Heaven volcanic field, south-central Washington". Geophysical Journal International. 97 (3). Oxford University Press: 381–390. Bibcode:1989GeoJI..97..381M. doi:10.1111/j.1365-246X.1989.tb00509.x.
- Nelson, D. (2007). Day Hiking South Cascades: Mt. St. Helens, Mt. Adams, Columbia Gorge. The Mountaineers Books.
- Schuster, J. E.; Blackwell, D. D.; Hammond, P. E.; Huntting, M. T. (1978). Heat Flow Studies in the Steamboat Mountain-Lemei Rock Area, Skamania County, Washington: Information Circular 62 (PDF). Olympia: Department of Natural Resources, Division of Geology and Earth Resources.
- Scott, W. E.; Iverson, R. M.; Vallance, J. W.; Hildreth, W. (1995). Volcano Hazards in the Mount Adams Region, Washington: Open-File Report 95-492. United States Geological Survey.
