= Fendorf Glacier =

Glacier in Antarctica

- Location within Antarctica
- Location: Ellsworth Land
- Coordinates: 79°30′S 84°49′W
- Thickness: unknown
- Terminus: Dobbratz Glacier
- Status: unknown

Fendorf Glacier (79°30′S 84°49′W) is a broad glacier draining from the eastern slopes of the Gifford Peaks and flowing north to merge with Dobbratz Glacier, in the Heritage Range of the Ellsworth Mountains, Antarctica. It was mapped by the United States Geological Survey from ground surveys and U.S. Navy air photos, 1961–66, and was named by the Advisory Committee on Antarctic Names for Lieutenant Commander James E. Fendorf, U.S. Navy, a pilot with Squadron VX-6 during Operation Deep Freeze 1966.

== See also ==
- List of glaciers in the Antarctic
- Glaciology
