= Indian Rock (disambiguation) =

Indian Rock may refer to:

- Indian rock, a music genre in the country of India
- Indian rock-cut architecture, rock-cut architecture of India
- Geology of India
- Indian Rock (mountain), tall peak in the state of Washington, USA
- Indian Rock Park, a public park in the city of Berkeley, California
- Indian Rock Park, an Indian battle site and public park in Salina, Kansas
- Indian Rock Schoolhouse, a historic schoolhouse in Amenia, New York
- Indian Rocks, a group of rocks in the South Shetland Islands, Antarctica
- Indian Rocks Beach, Florida, a city in Pinellas County, Florida
- Indian Rocks Causeway, a bascule bridge at Indian Rocks Beach, Florida
- Indian Rocks Dining Hall, a historic building in Preston County, West Virginia
