= Observatory Park =

Observatory Park may refer to:

== Australia ==
- Observatory Park, Brisbane, on Wickham Terrace, Spring Hill
- Observatory Park, Sydney, in the Sydney central business district

== United States ==
- Goldendale Observatory State Park, in Washington
- Highland Road Park Observatory, in Baton Rouge, Louisiana
