= Skelly Peak =

Mountain in Antarctica

Skelly Peak (79°23′S 85°19′W) is a peak (1,450 m) on the end of a spur, marking the northeast limit of Watlack Hills in the Heritage Range, Ellsworth Mountains. It was mapped by the United States Geological Survey (USGS) from ground surveys and U.S. Navy air photos from 1961 to 1966. It was named by the Advisory Committee on Antarctic Names (US-ACAN) for Donald J. Skelly, a hospital corpsman and U.S. Navy chief petty officer in charge of Palmer Station in 1966.
