= Satus Pass =

Mountain pass in Washington, United States

- Interactive map of Satus Pass
- Elevation: 3,107 feet (947 m)
- Traversed by: U.S. Highway 97

Third Approach
- Location: Klickitat County, Washington, U.S.
- Range: Cascades
- Coordinates: 45°59′05″N 120°39′13″W

Satus Pass (el. 3107 ft./947 m.) is a high mountain pass in the Cascade Range in the state of Washington. The pass connects Goldendale and the Klickitat Valley to the south with the Yakama Indian Reservation and Yakima Valley to the north. The Simcoe Mountains lie to the west of Satus Pass, and Bickleton Ridge in the Horse Heaven Hills to the east.

It is traversed by U.S. Highway 97.
