= Cochran Peak =

Mountain in Antarctica

Cochran Peak (79°39′S 84°39′W) is a sharp peak rising in the southern part of the Gifford Peaks, in the Heritage Range, Ellsworth Mountains. It was mapped by the United States Geological Survey from ground surveys and from U.S. Navy air photos, 1961–66, and named by the Advisory Committee on Antarctic Names for Henry B. Cochran, International Geophysical Year weather central meteorologist at Little America V in 1958.

== See also ==
- Mountains in Antarctica
