= Pojeta Peak =

Antarctic peak

Pojeta Peak(79°28′S 84°41′W / 79.467°S 84.683°W / -79.467; -84.683) is a peak rising to about 1,500 m in the central part of Webers Peaks, 2 nautical miles (3.7 km) southeast of Bingham Peak, in the Heritage Range, Ellsworth Mountains, Antarctica. It was named by the Advisory Committee on Antarctic Names (US-ACAN) after John Pojeta, Jr., a United States Geological Survey (USGS) paleontologist from 1963 and a field party member and paleontologist with the United States Antarctic Research Program (USARP) Ellsworth Mountains Expedition of 1979–80.

== See also ==
- Mountains in Antarctica
