= Hurst Peak =

Mountain in Antarctica

Hurst Peak (79°34′S 84°35′W) is a prominent rock peak, with an altitude of 1,790 metres (5,870 ft), at the southern end of the Webers Peaks in the Heritage Range of Antarctica. It was named by the University of Minnesota Geological Party, 1963–64, for aviation machinist James E. Hurst, who served as a crew member aboard the LC-47 aircraft that made the first 1963–64 flight to the Ellsworth Mountains.

== See also ==
- Mountains in Antarctica
