= Simcoe Mountains =

Volcano in Washington, United States

- Wahkshum (Yakama)
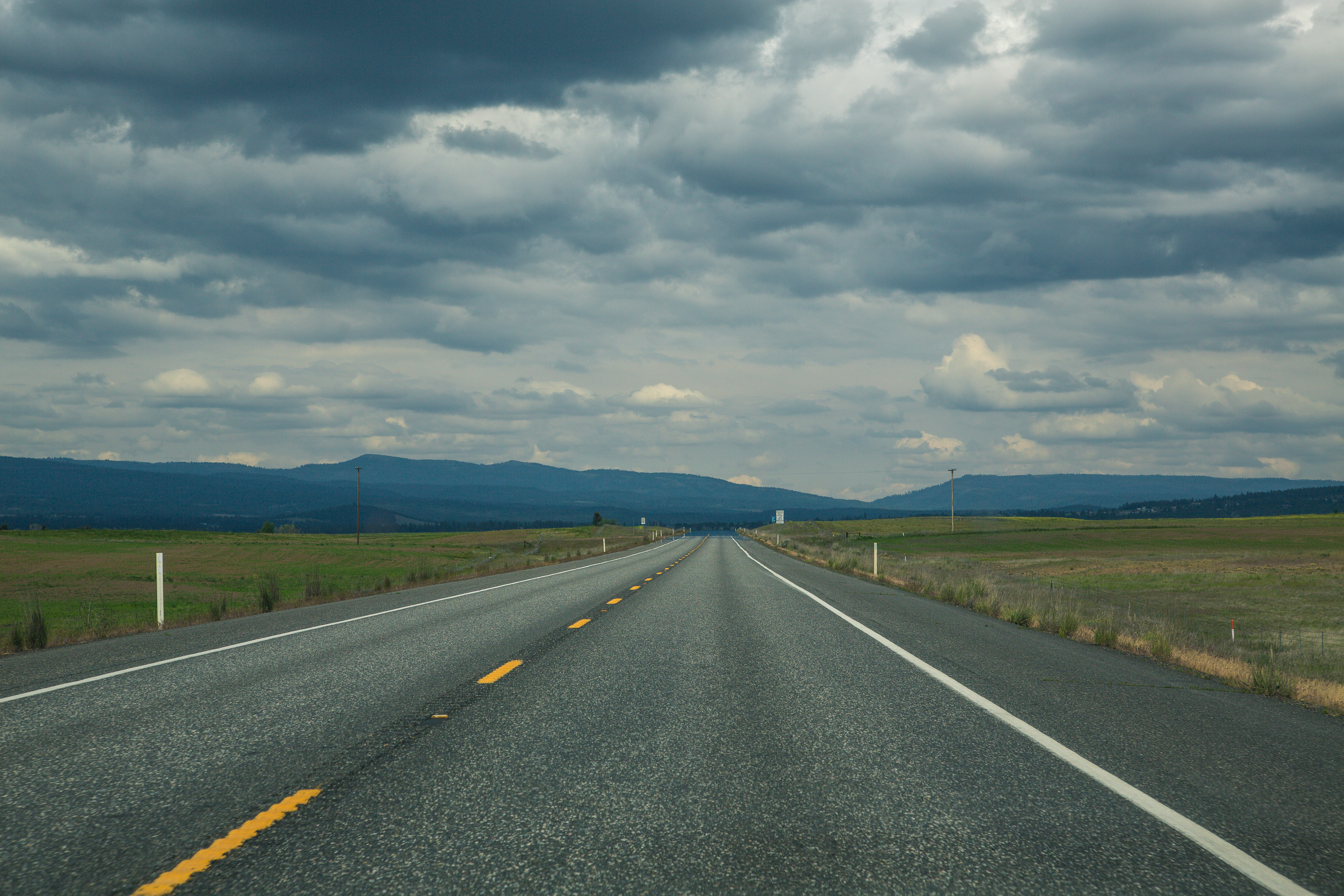
- The Simcoe Mountains seen from US 97 near Goldendale, Washington.

Highest point
- Peak: Indian Rock
- Elevation: 5,851 ft (1,783 m)
- Coordinates: 45°59′38″N 120°49′24″W

Geography
- Location within Washington (state)
- Country: United States
- State: Washington
- Counties: Klickitat and Yakima

Geology
- Mountain type: Volcanic field
- Rock type(s): Basalt and rhyolite
- Last eruption: 631,000 years ago (± 27,000 years)

The Simcoe Mountains Volcanic Field, sometimes called the Simcoe Highlands, is a group of lava flows and extinct cinder cones located to the east of the Cascade Range in south-central Washington, United States. The mountains lie within Klickitat and Yakima Counties with the northern half making up part of the Yakama Indian Reservation. Although the volcanic field is located near the Cascade Arc of volcanoes, it is an intraplate volcanic field rather than having activity sourced from the Cascadia subduction zone. The last known eruption was about 631,000 years ago.

The Saddle Mountains was an important transportation corridor for Native Americans in the region, including the Yakama, with people passing over then to get between the Yakima Valley to the north and traditional fishing grounds along the Columbia River to the south. During the Yakima War, the United States Army constructed a road through the mountains to provide better access to forts on either side. Today it is traversed by U.S. Route 97 which passes over Satus Pass.

The upper slopes of the Simcoe Mountains are forested while the lower slopes are covered by grassland in a more arid climate. The area provides habitat for a variety of plant and animal life in different elevation-dependant ecological zones, both on land and in streams draining the area. Waterways flow into the Yakima and Klickitat Rivers which ultimately flow to the Columbia.

== Geography ==
The term Simcoe Mountains can refer to two geographical features, the highland area along the ridge that continues eastward as the Horse Heaven Hills and the entire area encompassed by volcanic material from the Simcoe Mountains Volcanic Field. The volcanic region stretches a north–south distance of approximately 45 mi (72 km) from near Goldendale, Washington in the south to include part of the Yakama Indian Reservation in the north. It is centered 28 mi (45 km) east of Mount Adams, a major Cascade Volcano, and covers a land area of 640 sq mi (1,700 km^{2}).

The highest point in the range is typically considered to be the remains of a basaltic shield named Indian Rock with a summit at 5,820 ft (1,770 m) above sea level. A handful of other vents reach above 5,000 ft (1,500 m) elevation.

The region lies adjacent to the eastern foothills of the Cascade Mountains with more arid conditions than points a short distance to the west due to the rain shadow effect. The base of the Simcoe Mountains exhibits a Köppen climate classification of cold semi-arid with most of the land categorized as cold-summer Mediterranean and a small area in the highest elevations with dry-summer subarctic climate. Precipitation varies significantly both from west to east and from low to high elevation. Goldendale, located within the volcanic field at around 1,600 ft (490 m) elevation experiences an average of 17 in (430 mm) of precipitation annually while Indian Rock sees an average of 41 in (1,000 mm). Precipitation most frequently falls from October to March with summer months being particularly dry.

The crest of the highland area about 13 miles (21 km) north of Goldendale forms the southern boundary of the Yakama Indian Reservation. South of there, land is primarily privately owned with timer companies owning a large portion of the forested mid- and upper-elevations with farms and ranches in the more arid grasslands below. A few areas of public land, including small state parks and a wildlife area are present.

A few farm small communities are sprinkled within and near the volcanic field. The northeastern quarter drains via small streams including Satus and Toppenish Creeks into the Yakima River while the western and northwestern quarter drains to the Klickitat River with the south half flowing to the Lower Klickitat River. U.S. Route 97 passes through the field over Satus Pass, leading north to Yakima and south to Bend, Oregon.

== History ==
The Simcoe Mountains region has been inhabited by humans for millennia, first by Native Americans and later including European American settlement. The land is considered the ancestral homeland of several Sahaptin-speaking peoples, including the Yakama, Cayuse, and Walla Walla. Yakama legend describes the role the Simcoe Mountains played in their understanding of regional history. The believed the Sun was originally a man and that he had five mountains for his wives - Simcoe Mountains, Goat Rocks, Mount Adams, Mount Rainier, and Mount St. Helens.

The Sun visited the Simcoe Mountains, termed Wahkshum, first each morning followed by the Goat Rocks, referred to as Plash-Plash, and Mount Adams (Pahto) third. This order made Pahto jealous leading her to break down the earlier wives high heads, causing them to not reach the high elevations the other peaks do.

The region was largely used as a travel corridor between the Yakima Valley and traditional fishing grounds on the Columbia River, including the now flooded Celilo Falls. One major route was the As-sööm Trail or Eel Road. The highland area itself was fairly remote and travelers avoided it during the winter months due to frequent blizzards and other adverse weather conditions. The Yakama, Nez Perce, and Umatilla peoples ceded the southern half of the Simcoe Mountains to the United States at the Walla Walla Council in 1855 with the northern half becoming part of the Yakama Indian Reservation.

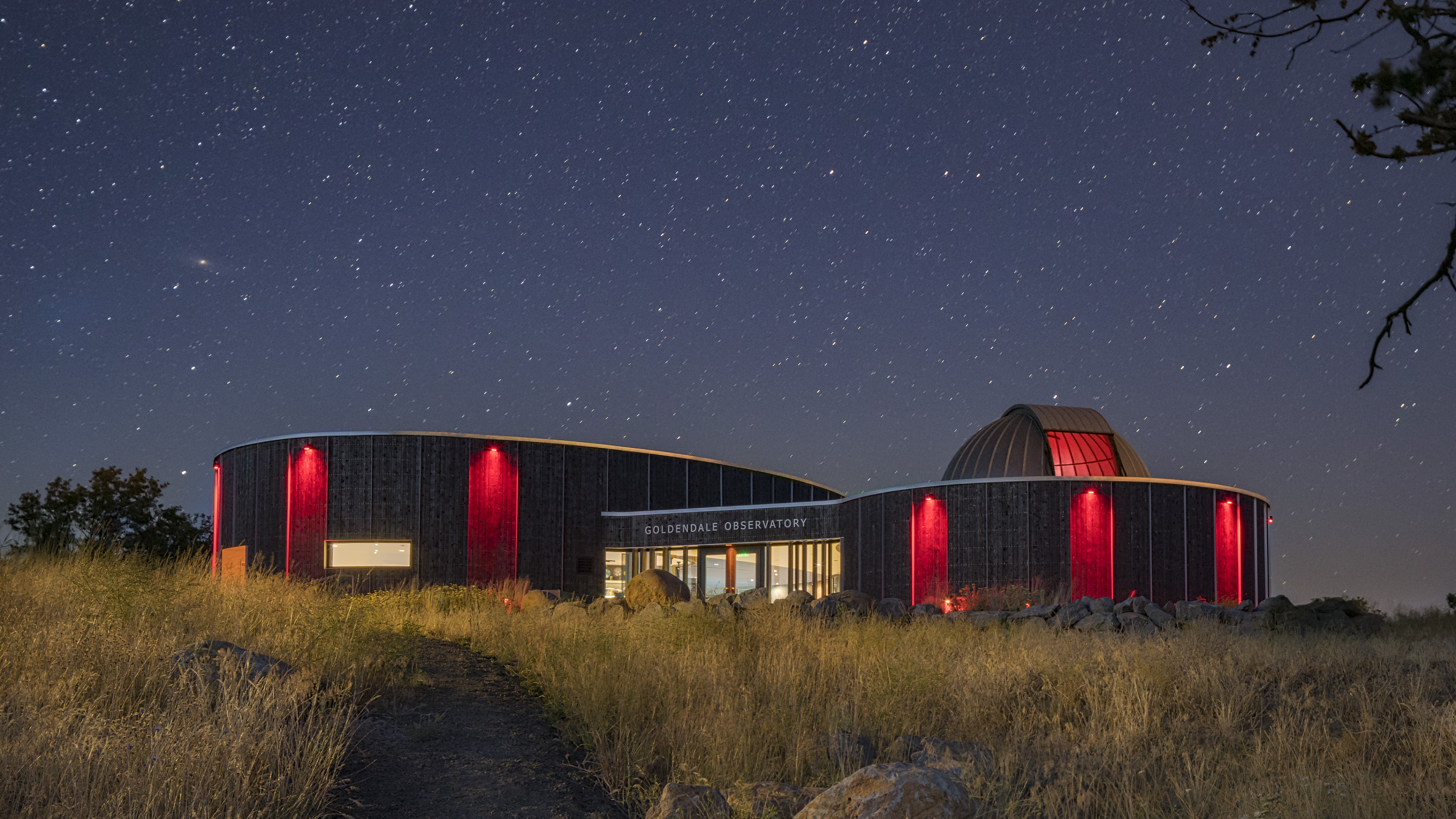
The Goldendale Observatory which sits on an eruptive vent of the Simcoe Mountains.

The United States Army built Fort Simcoe along the Eel Road near a common gathering place and spring at the northern base of the Simcoe Mountains in 1856 to keep tabs on Native Americans utilizing the corridor during the Yakima War between Native Americans and the United States. After construction of Fort Simcoe, the military built a wagon road between there and Fort Dalles along the Columbia River. The route largely followed Eel Road because of favorable terrain and easy access to water. Fort Simcoe, which took its name from a Sahaptin language term for a geographic saddle, was the source for the modern name of the Simcoe Mountains.

Goldendale, located south of the highland area but within the volcanic field, was first settled in 1859 with the town being platted in 1872. The surrounding Klickitat Valley became a minor agricultural center, mostly producing wheat. The first rail line into the valley reached Goldendale in 1903. The town would become the largest in the Simcoe Mountains area with a population of 3,453 in 2020.

A ski area and lodge opened on Satus Pass in 1952 but was only open for 24 years because the location did not offer a reliable enough supply of snow. The Goldendale Observatory was built on a vent of the volcanic field on the north side of Goldendale by Clark College in 1973 because the site offered less light pollution and clearer skies than were available near the school in Vancouver, Washington. The observatory continues to operate, is open to the public, and sits within a state park.

== Geology ==
Underlying the Simcoe Mountains is basalt that was erupted by the Columbia River Basalt Group from vents to the east as recently as 14.5 million years ago. Rotation of the North American Plate in the Pacific Northwest during and after the Columbia River Basalt Group flows led to the rise of the Yakima Fold Belt, a series of east–west ridges upon which the Simcoe Mountains lie, most notably the western end of the anticline that created the Horse Heaven Hills that extend eastward toward Kennewick. The rise of these ridges significantly disrupted the path of the Columbia River, which formerly flowed through the area but was absent by the time the volcanic field formed. Small earthquakes occur in the region as north–south compression related to the plate rotation causing local anticlines to continue to grow.

Evidence of glaciation has not been observed in the area, likely owing to the highlands' comparatively low elevation and location to the east of the crest of the Cascade Mountains. Lying in the rain shadow, this region is significantly more arid than points just a short distance to the west. The lavas erupted here are more porus than the underlying Columbia River Basalt Group allowing water to collect and move. Numerous springs are located within the volcanic region and groundwater flows outward from the central highland area toward Goldendale as well as eventually flowing into Satus and Toppenish Creeks which are tributaries of the Yakima River.

Topsoil is largely loess blown off the Cascades during the Last Glacial Maximum. Volcanic material from the Simcoe Mountains constitutes part of the alluvium carried downstream by Satus and Toppenish Creeks draining the northern half of the field

=== Volcanism ===
Eruptions from this volcanic field occurred in three periods during the Pliocene and Quaternary; the first episode occurred 4.2–3.2 million years ago. the second was from 2.2 to 1.2 million years ago, and the most recent episode lasted from 1.0 to 0.6 million years ago. The most recent known eruption was a trachybasalt lava flow dated to 631,000 ± 27,000 years ago called the "Trachybasalt of Pretty Swamp". Most eruptive vents were short-lived and did not erupt large volumes of material but a few sites exhibit longer lived activity. Earlier eruptions were rhyolitic in nature rather than basaltic and were thus more explosive.

Some of the volcanic activity in Simcoe Mountains happened at the same time as eruptions of Goat Rocks to the northwest and the Boring Lava Field near Portland, Oregon. For the last 350,000 years Simcoe was active, there was also activity in the Mount Adams region, but Mount Adams itself had not yet started forming. Indian Heaven, a volcanic field farther to the west, is also generally much younger than Simcoe, becoming active only in the most recent 200,000 years of activity at Simcoe Mountains Volcanic Field. Mount St. Helens, like Mount Adams, entirely postdates activity at Simcoe Mountains. The Klickitat River roughly delineates the boundary between andesitic Mount Adams material and that which was erupted by the Simcoe Mountains.

Research published in the 2020s hypothesized that lava flows from the Simcoe Highlands may have dammed the Columbia River, which flowed from what is now the Yakima Valley into the eastern end of the Columbia River Gorge at the time. According to the theory, the lake created by the dam eventually overtopped the Horse Heaven Hills to create Wallula Gap through which the Columbia River flows today. Other research points toward this river migration being caused by the rise of the Horse Heaven Hills instead of volcanism at Simcoe.

Eruptive material from vents in the Simcoe Mountains contains a much higher basalt content than nearby Mount Adams. This has led researchers to imply that this volcanic field is intraplate in origin rather than a part of the Cascades, which formed from subduction of the offshore Juan de Fuca Plate beneath the North American Plate.

== Ecology ==
Generally speaking there are two to three ecological zones in the Simcoe Mountains depending on the source used, mostly dependent on elevation. The lowest elevations exhibit shrub–steppe with sagebrush and both native and invasive grasses present. Mid elevations experience more rainfall and are a little cooler, though still largely display grassland flora including wildflowers like elkhorns clarkia and scabland wild buckwheat while the ridges and mountain tops can be forested with Ponderosa pine, western juniper, and Douglas fir. Native American communities were aware of berries growing in the forested region, including the huckleberry.

Small streams produce productive riparian zones even in low elevations with large trees including black cottonwood present despite arid conditions. In riparian zones, plants may source water both from the surface and from the groundwater system. Many streams may dry up on the surface during the summer but continue to flow underground because the porous nature of the rocks allows for groundwater movement in the region. Small cacti can also be seen in the arid elevations.

Fauna exhibit a similar transition through the different elevation levels of the mountains with lower elevations making up part of the Columbia Plateau ecoregion and higher elevations falling within the Eastern Cascades Slopes and Foothills. Bighorn sheep, mule deer, and elk are among the large mammals that have been observed in the arid region. Reptiles such as the western rattlesnake and other snakes and lizards are also present. American black bear, raccoons, and coyotes are among the medium to large mammals that can be found in the upper elevations along with many of those that are also found in the lower elevations. Small rodents like the chipmunk and a few small lizards are present in the forested area.

Birds are common, ranging in size from the red-tailed hawk to smaller mountain bluebird, and California quail among others. Many of the birds in the Simcoe Mountains can be observed across nearly all elevation zones. Wild turkey can be found on the south slopes of the highland area north of Goldendale and forest grouse are present in riparian zones and disused logging roads.

Small streams draining the Simcoe Mountains on the south and west slopes form important habitat for migratory fish. Steelhead salmon utilize numerous water bodies but are at risk from low water flow and high water temperatures. Water in the mountains is relatively free from pollutants owing to the lack of permanent human habitation and farming activities in the forested region. Water is pulled from streams and the groundwater system for irrigation in the Goldendale area.

== See also ==
- List of Volcanoes of the United States
