= Webers Peaks =

Webers Peaks (79°28′S 84°40′W) is a line of peaks on a ridge bounded by Splettstoesser Glacier on the north, Balish Glacier on the east and Dobbratz and Fendorf Glaciers on the west, in the Heritage Range, Ellsworth Mountains. They were named by the University of Minnesota Ellsworth Mountains Party of 1962–63 for geologist Gerald F. Webers, a member of that party.

== Features ==
Geographical features include:

- Dobbratz Glacier
- Hurst Peak
- Pojeta Peak
- Springer Peak
