= Maagoe Peak =

Mountain in Antarctica

Maagoe Peak (79°33′S 85°0′W) is a 1,850 metres (6,070 ft) high peak located at the northern end of the Gifford Peaks in the Heritage Range of the Ellsworth Mountains, Antarctica. It was mapped by the United States Geological Survey based on ground surveys and aerial photographs taken by the U.S. Navy between 1961 and 1966. It was named by the Advisory Committee on Antarctic Names in honor of Steffen Maagoe, an ionospheric scientist at Eights Station in 1964.

== See also ==
- Mountains in Antarctica
