= Watlack Hills =

Watlack Hills (79°26′S 85°22′W) is a line of mainly ice-free hills, 10 nautical miles (18 km) long, bounded by the White Escarpment, Splettstoesser Glacier, and Dobbratz Glacier, in the Heritage Range. Named by the University of Minnesota Geological Party to these mountains, 1963–64, for Chief Warrant Officer Richard G. Watlack, a pilot with the 62nd Transportation Detachment, who assisted the party.

== See also ==
Geographical features include:

- Carnell Peak
- Dobbratz Glacier
- Mount Twiss
- Skelly Peak
