= Dobbratz Glacier =

Glacier in Antarctica

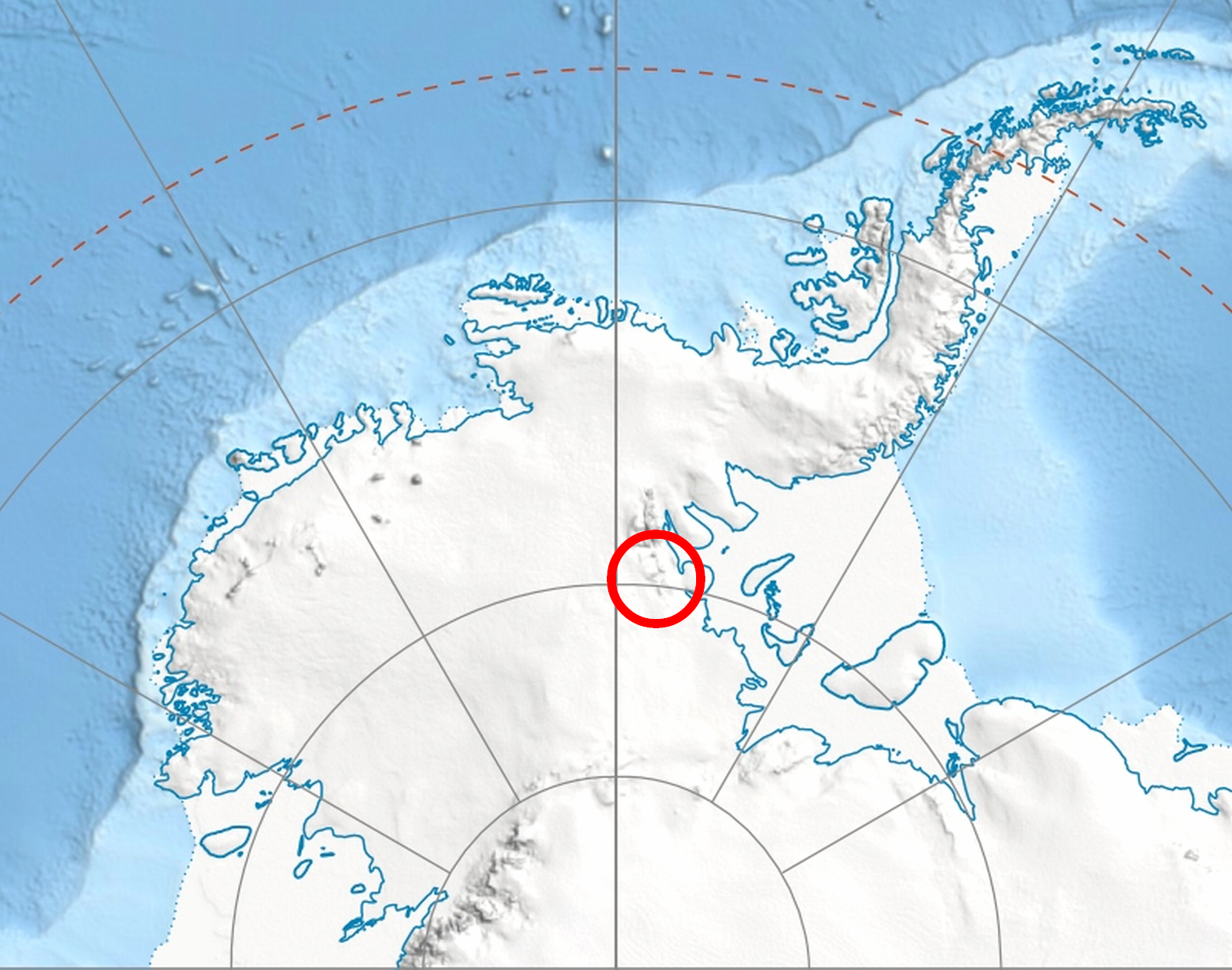
- Location of Heritage Range in Western Antarctica

- Location within Antarctica
- Type: tributary
- Location: Ellsworth Land
- Coordinates: 79°24′00″S 85°05′00″W
- Thickness: unknown
- Terminus: Splettstoesser Glacier
- Status: unknown

Dobbratz Glacier (79°24′S 85°5′W) is a broad tributary glacier which drains the south part of the White Escarpment and flows northeast between the Watlack Hills and the Webers Peaks into Splettstoesser Glacier, in the Heritage Range. It was named by the University of Minnesota Geological Party, 1963–64, for Major Joseph Dobbratz, a United States Marine Corps pilot who supported the party.

== See also ==
- List of glaciers in the Antarctic
- Glaciology
