= Edith Minot Twiss =

American botanist (1873-1925)

- Twiss, from a 1924 passport photo
- Born: March 10, 1873; Columbus, Ohio, U.S.
- Died: July 4, 1925 (aged 52); Poughkeepsie, New York, U.S.
- Occupations: Botanist, college professor

Edith Minot Twiss (March 10, 1873 – July 4, 1925) was an American botanist and college professor. She taught botany and bacteriology and served as Dean of Women at Washburn College in Kansas from 1910 until 1919, and at Vassar College in her last years.

== Biography ==
Twiss was born in Columbus, Ohio, the daughter of George Henry Twiss and Julia Minot Twiss. Her father was a high school principal and ran a bookstore. She graduated from Ohio State University in 1895, and earned a master's degree in botany at the University of Chicago in 1907, with a thesis titled "The Prothallia of the Filicineae". She completed doctoral studies at the University of Chicago in 1909.

Twiss taught school in Cleveland after college. She was hired to teach botany, plant physiology and bacteriology at Washburn College in Topeka, Kansas in 1910. She was elected Dean of Women at Washburn in 1911. She taught an innovative public health course in 1913, with the students' work contributing to the Public Health Survey of Topeka (1914). In 1919 she left Washburn to teach at Vassar College, "at a considerable increase in salary," according to one report.

Twiss was a fellow of the American Association for the Advancement of Science, and a member of the Daughters of the American Revolution, Sigma Xi, and Kappa Kappa Gamma. She died in 1925, at the age of 52, at a tuberculosis hospital in Poughkeepsie, New York.

== Publications ==
- "The Prothallia of Aneimia and Lygodium" (1910, based on her doctoral dissertation)
- "The Effect of Pasteurizing Temperatures on the Paratyphoid Group" (1920)
