= Sumner Twiss =

American academic

Sumner Twiss was Distinguished Professor of Human Rights, Ethics, and Religion at Florida State University, where he held joint appointments in the Department of Religion and the Center for the Advancement of Human Rights. He served as a professor of Religious Studies at Brown University. He was a leading authority on theories of religion and comparative religious ethics, and served as Co-Editor of the Journal of Religious Ethics (Blackwell Publishing) and Senior Editor of a book series, Advancing Human Rights (Georgetown University Press).

He was a: Post-Doctoral Fellow of the Society for Values in Higher Education; Fellow of the Institute of Society, Ethics, and the Life-Sciences. He co-directed a Summer Seminar for College Teachers, directed a National Endowment for the Humanities Award, and directed the Chiang Ching-kuo Foundation Award for International Scholarly Exchange.

== Published books ==
Comparative Religious Ethics: A New Method (co-author with David Little). New York: Harper & Row; Toronto: Fitzhenry & Whiteside, 1978. 266 pp.
Genetic Counseling: Facts, Values, and Norms (co-editor with Alexander Capron, Marc Lappe, Robert Murray, and Tabitha Powledge). New York: Alan R. Liss, 1979. 344 pp.
Experience of the Sacred: Readings in the Phenomenology of Religion (co-edited with Walter H. Conser Jr.). Hanover and London: University Press of New England/Brown University 1992. 294 pp. with 74 pp. introduction.
Religion and Human Rights (co-edited with John Kelsay). New York: Project on Religion and Human Rights/Human Rights Watch, 1994. 123 pp. with introductory material and epilogue.
Religious Diversity and American Religious History: Studies in Traditions and Cultures (co-edited with Walter H. Conser Jr.). Athens and London: University of Georgia Press, 1997, 305 pp.
Explorations in Global Ethics: Comparative Religious Ethics and Interreligious Dialogue (co-edited with Bruce Grelle). Boulder, Co. and London: Westview Press/Perseus Books, 1998. 350 pp. including introduction. Paperbound edition, 2000.
