= Indian Rock (mountain) =

Mountain in Washington (state), United States

Highest point
- Elevation: 5,849 ft (1,783 m) NAVD 88
- Prominence: 2,565 ft (782 m)
- Coordinates: 45°59′20″N 120°49′22″W

Geography
- Location: Klickitat County, Washington, U.S.
- Parent range: Columbia Plateau
- Topo map: USGS Indian Rock

Indian Rock is a tall peak in the Simcoe Mountains of Washington, USA. At 5,849 feet (1,783 m) in elevation, it is the highest point in Klickitat County.

== See also ==
- Petroglyph Drawings by Native Americans on rocks
