= Mount Twiss =

Mountain in Ellsworth Land, Antarctica

Mount Twiss (79°23′S 85°36′W) is a peak (2,000 m) at the north end of Watlack Hills in the Heritage Range, Ellsworth Mountains. Antarctica. It was mapped by the United States Geological Survey (USGS) from ground surveys and U.S. Navy air photos from 1961 to 1966. It was named by the Advisory Committee on Antarctic Names (US-ACAN) after John R. Twiss, Jr. Twiss served on the support staff at McMurdo Station from 1961 to 1963, was a United States Antarctic Research Program (USARP) Representative at McMurdo Station in the 1964–65 season, a USARP Representative on USNS Eltanin Cruise 34 in 1968, staff of the National Science Foundation (NSF) International Decade of Ocean Exploration from 1970 to 1974, and executive director of the Marine Mammal Commission from 1974.
