= Big Lava Bed =

Lava field in Gifford Pinchot National Forest, U.S.

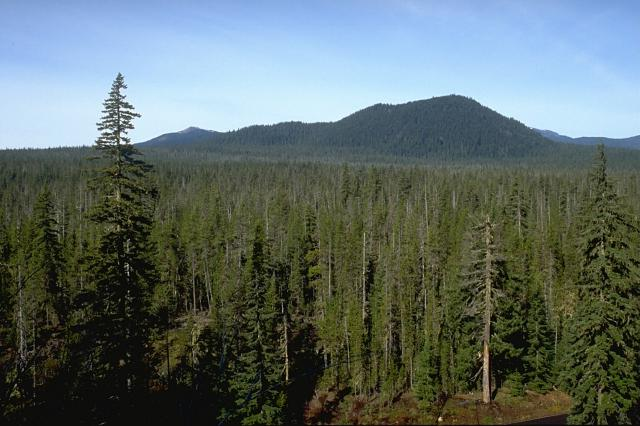
- The forested slope in the foreground is part of the Big Lava Bed, a 0.9 cu km lava flow erupted from the cinder cone in the background about 8200 years ago. The lava flow traveled 13 km from the source crater and is the youngest feature of the Indian Heaven volcanic field.

Highest point
- Elevation: 4,195 feet (1,279 m)
- Coordinates: 45.9°N 121.75°W

Geography
- Location: Skamania County, Washington, U.S.
- Parent range: Cascade Range

Geology
- Rock age(s): 6250 BC ± 100 years, in the late Pleistocene to Holocene
- Mountain type(s): Fissure vent, cinder cone and lava field
- Volcanic field: Indian Heaven
- Last eruption: 8200 years ago

The Big Lava Bed, located in the Gifford Pinchot National Forest in the southwestern area of the State of Washington, originated from a 500-foot-deep crater in the northern center of the bed. The Big Lava Bed is the youngest feature of the Indian Heaven volcanic field. The 0.9-cubic kilometer lava flow erupted from the cinder cone about 8200 years ago. The lava flow traveled 13 km from the source crater. Lodgepole pine, alder, and other pioneer plants struggle to grow, seen sparsely growing between and amid towering rock piles, caves, and strange lava formations. Access into the interior of the lava bed is difficult, since there are no roads or trails crossing the lava field. Explorers who wish to venture deep within the lava flow are advised to choose their route carefully. Compasses are not always reliable, since local magnetic influences affect their magnetic performance in the vast expanse of rock.

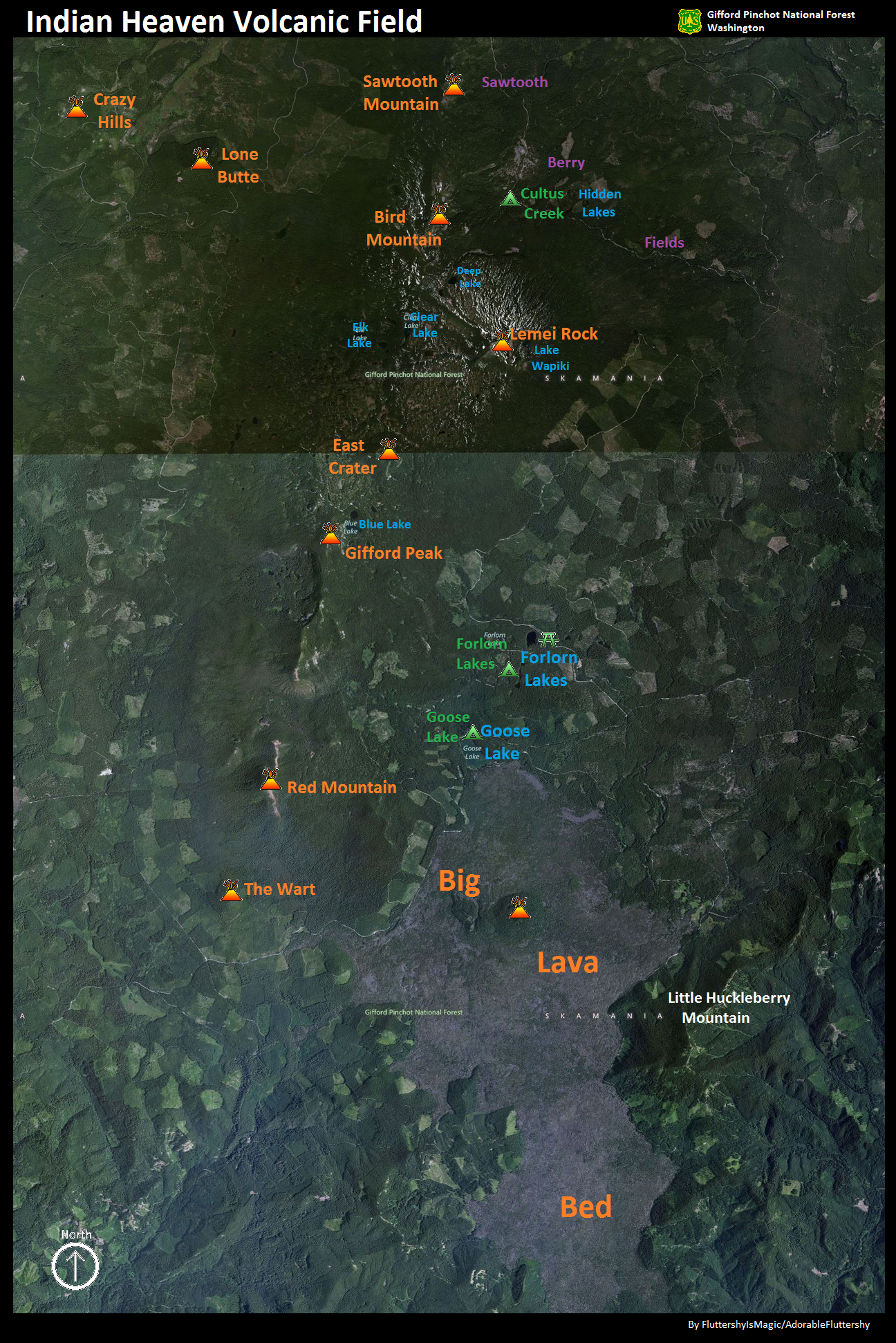
Satellite map showing the various shield volcanoes topped by cinder and spatter cones that characterizes the Indian Heaven Volcanic Field The Big Lava Flow can be seen as the lighter green/brown area at the bottom center. The orange volcano icon in the flow marks the location of the cinder cone, the lava flow's source.

== See also ==
- Cascade Volcanoes
- List of volcanoes in the United States
- Indian Heaven Wilderness
