= Gifford Peaks =

Mountain range in Antarctica

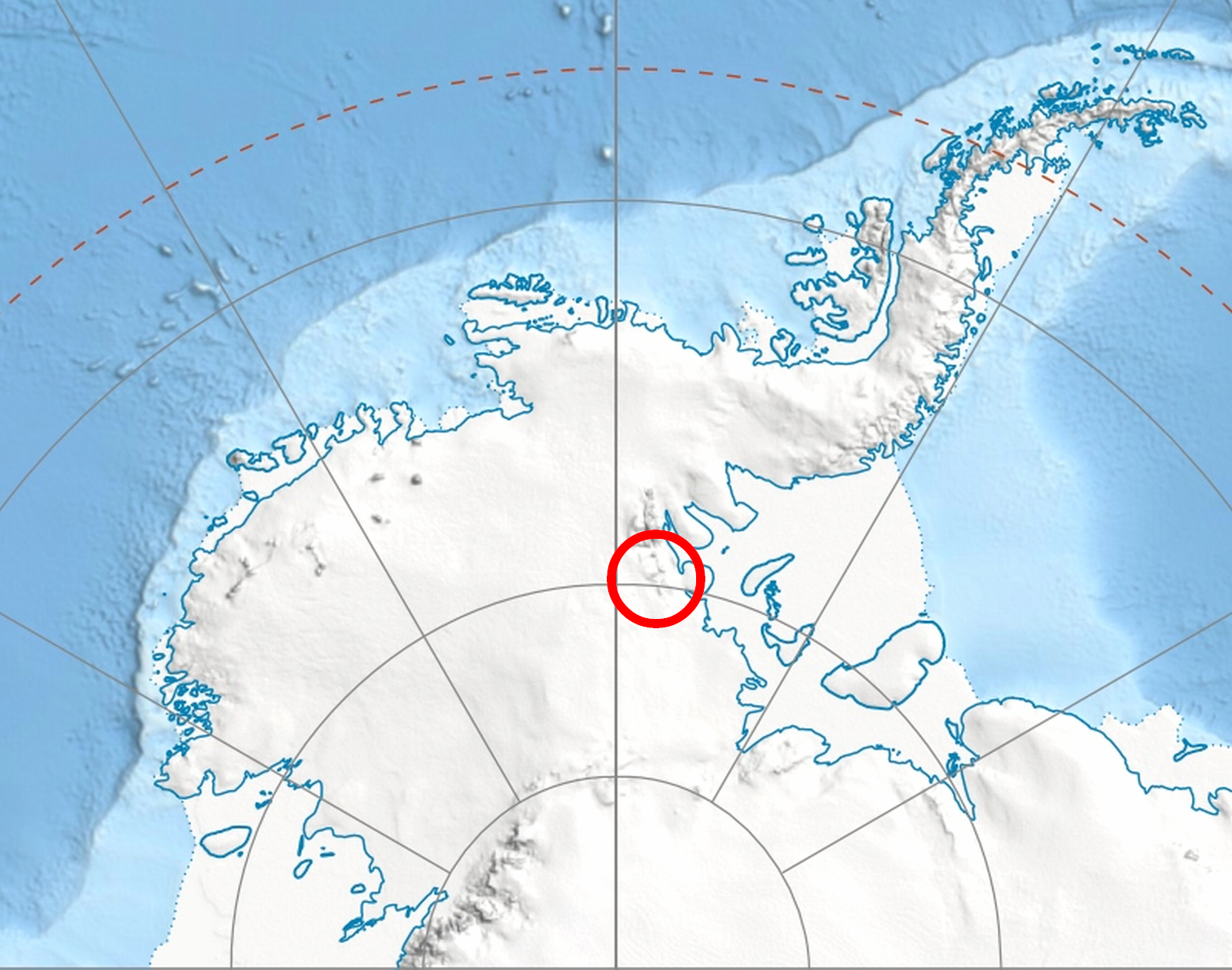
Location of Heritage Range in Western Antarctica

Gifford Peaks (79°36′S 84°48′W) are a line of sharp peaks and ridges along the escarpment at the west side of the Heritage Range, located between Watlack Hills and Soholt Peaks. They were named by the University of Minnesota Geological Party of 1963–64 for Chief Warrant Officer Leonard A. Gifford, a pilot of the 62nd Transportation Detachment who aided the party.

== See also ==
- Mountains in Antarctica

Geographical features include:

- Fendorf Glacier
- Cochran Peak
- Lamb Peak
- Maagoe Peak
