= Polygenetic volcanic field =

Group of volcanoes, each of which erupts repeatedly

A polygenetic volcanic field is a group of polygenetic volcanoes, each of which erupts repeatedly, in contrast with monogenetic volcanoes, each of which erupts only once. Polygenetic volcanic fields generally occur where there is a high-level magma chamber. These volcanic fields may show lithological discontinuities due to major changes in magma chemistry, volcanotectonic events, or long erosional intervals, and may last over 10 million years.

Unlike monogenetic volcanoes, polygenetic volcanoes reach massive sizes, such as Mauna Loa, which is the world's largest active volcano.

Polygenetic volcanoes include stratovolcanoes, complex volcanoes, somma volcanoes, shield volcanoes and calderas.

== See also ==
- Monogenetic volcanic field – Group of volcanoes, each of which erupts once
