= Goldendale Observatory State Park =

State park in Washington (state), United States

Goldendale Observatory State Park Heritage Site
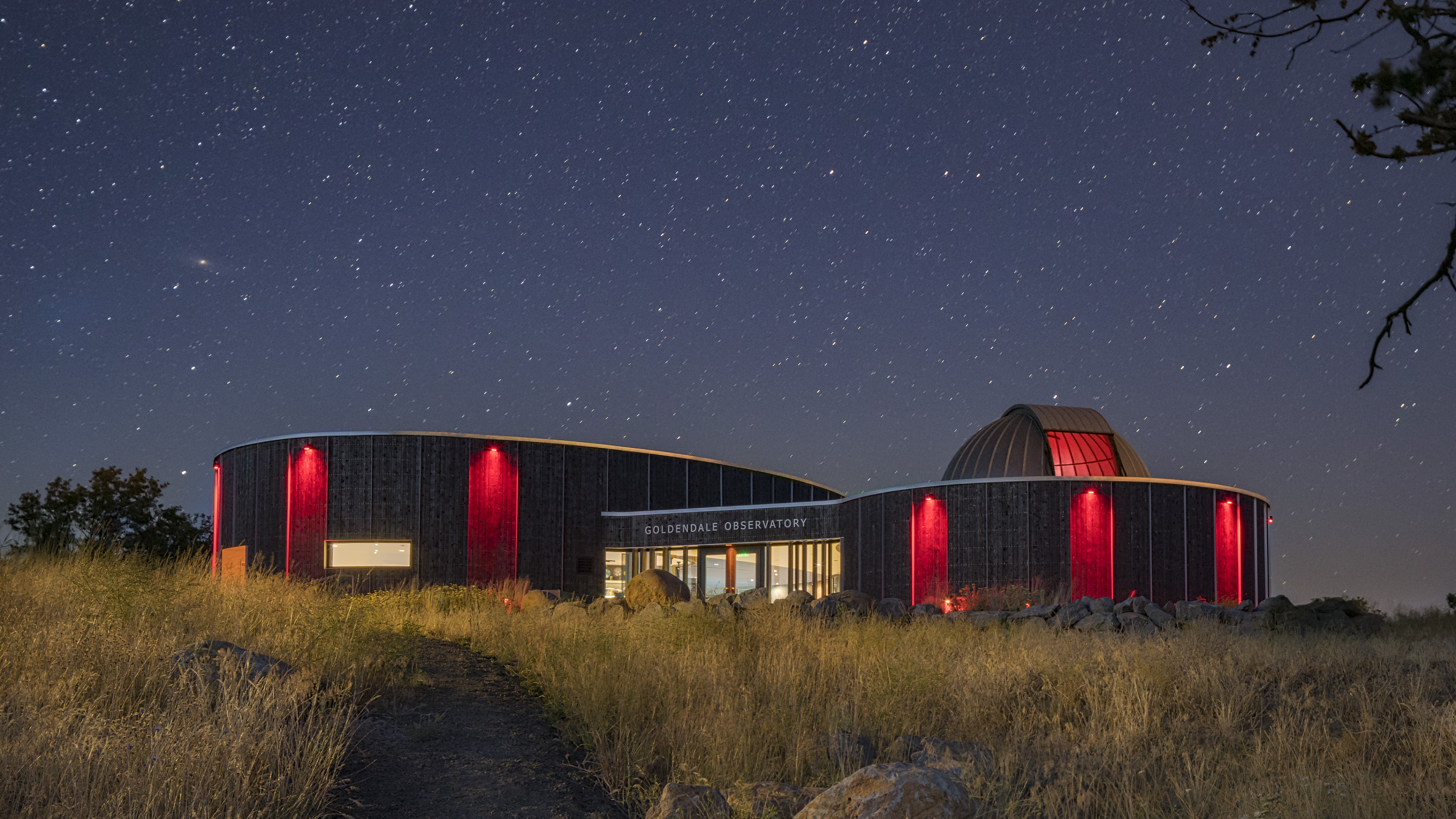

- Location within Washington (state) Location within the United States
- Location: Goldendale, Washington, United States
- Coordinates: 45°50′20″N 120°48′55″W
- Area: 5 acres (2.0 ha)
- Elevation: 2,106 ft (642 m)
- Established: 1973 observatory; 1980 state park
- Administrator: Washington State Parks and Recreation Commission
- Website: Official website

Goldendale Observatory State Park Heritage Site is an educational facility on the northern side of Goldendale, Washington, notable for its unusually large public telescope. The state park occupies five acres (2.0 ha) atop a 2,100-foot (640 m) hill.

Access is via a winding paved road through an oak forest. The site includes a small picnic area, interpretive center, amphitheater, and the observatory.

There are several telescopes on-site, including portable Dobsonians, a permanently mounted Hydrogen-Alpha solar telescope, and the primary instrument; a 24.5-inch reflector which is housed in the South Dome. The facility receives 30,000–40,000 visitors annually. In 2022, the Observatory reopened after a lengthy renovation process.

== History ==
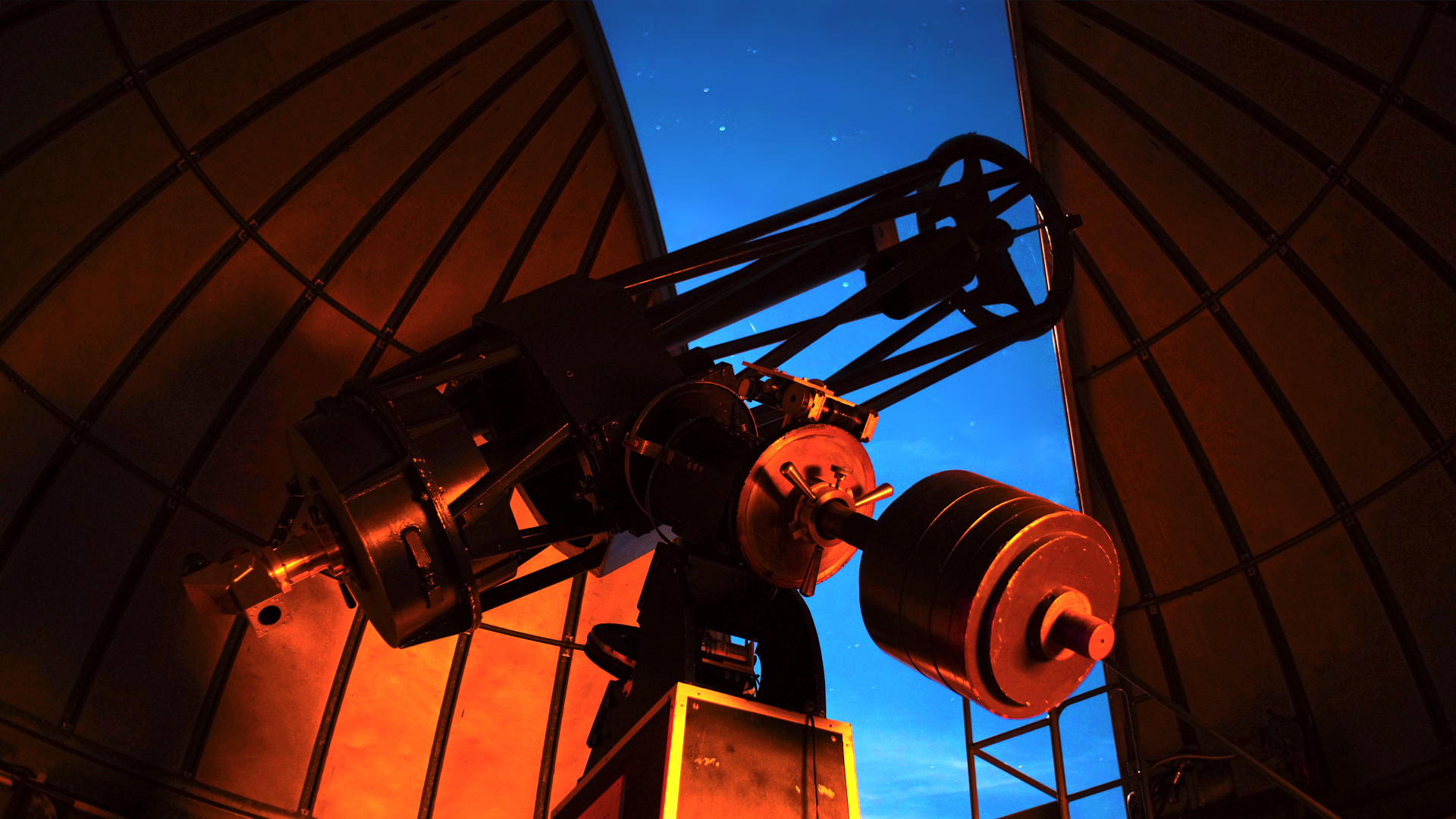
The 24.5-inch Classical Cassegrain Telescope as it appeared in 2014

The main 24-inch telescope is the reason for the existence of Goldendale Observatory and was the work of four amateur astronomers—M.W. McConnell, John Marshall, Don Conner and O.W. VanderVelden—who built a 24.5-inch (620 mm) Cassegrain reflecting telescope for Clark College in Vancouver, Washington, which paid for the materials to make the telescope.

At the time, this instrument was one of the largest amateur-built telescopes in the world. However, once built, the college sought a clearer, darker area to install the telescope due to light pollution from Vancouver and nearby Portland, Oregon, and the typically wet and cloudy weather on the windward side of the Cascade Mountain Range.

While traveling through Goldendale, Washington, the telescope builders met a local diner owner and city council member who suggested they donate the telescope to the town. An agreement was made and the telescope was donated by the college to Goldendale on the condition that the community would build an observatory to house the telescope. A local, non-profit organization was created to plan and support the observatory which was ultimately constructed one mile (1.6 km) north of the town center using donations, loans, and a $135,000 grant from the Economic Development Administration.

The Observatory design was based on the University of Washington's Manastash Ridge Observatory built west of Ellensburg in 1972. Unlike that facility, the intent of the founders and community college was for Goldendale Observatory to serve primarily as a center of public science education. The Observatory was built over a period of several months and dedicated on October 13, 1973. The south observatory dome has a diameter of 20 feet (6.1 m), and the north dome a diameter of 10 feet (3.0 m).

The observatory served as the Astronomical League's official headquarters during a solar eclipse which occurred on February 26, 1979, six years after the observatory opened. Approximately 15,000 people came to the town of Goldendale on that date to observe the total eclipse. The Observatory, its lands, and its debt were acquired by the state government in 1980, after being operated by the Goldendale Observatory Corporation since its dedication. The park received its designation as a "state park heritage site" in 2014.

== Upgrades ==
Beginning in 2013, a multi-phase facility improvement project began at Goldendale Observatory using $6 million in funding allocated from the state government. Due to a state budget freeze the project was not funded until a new budget was passed in February 2018. Demolition of the old building took place that October, removing all structures except the south dome building housing the 24-inch telescope. In 2019, a spokesman for Washington State Parks said they had worked with the IDA on the lighting plan for the renovated observatory and, working with the local community, planned to apply for dark sky status when the new observatory was completed. However, due to conflicts between IDA requirements and Washington State Parks policies, there are no plans to apply for any current IDA Dark Sky Place certifications.

The upgraded observatory opened on February 28, 2020, but closed less than a month later due to the COVID-19 pandemic. On April 7, 2022, Goldendale Observatory celebrated a grand reopening ceremony. The new design has three times the space, upgraded facilities, and a much larger parking area. Public visitation is available every weekend, by appointment only.

== Dark sky status ==
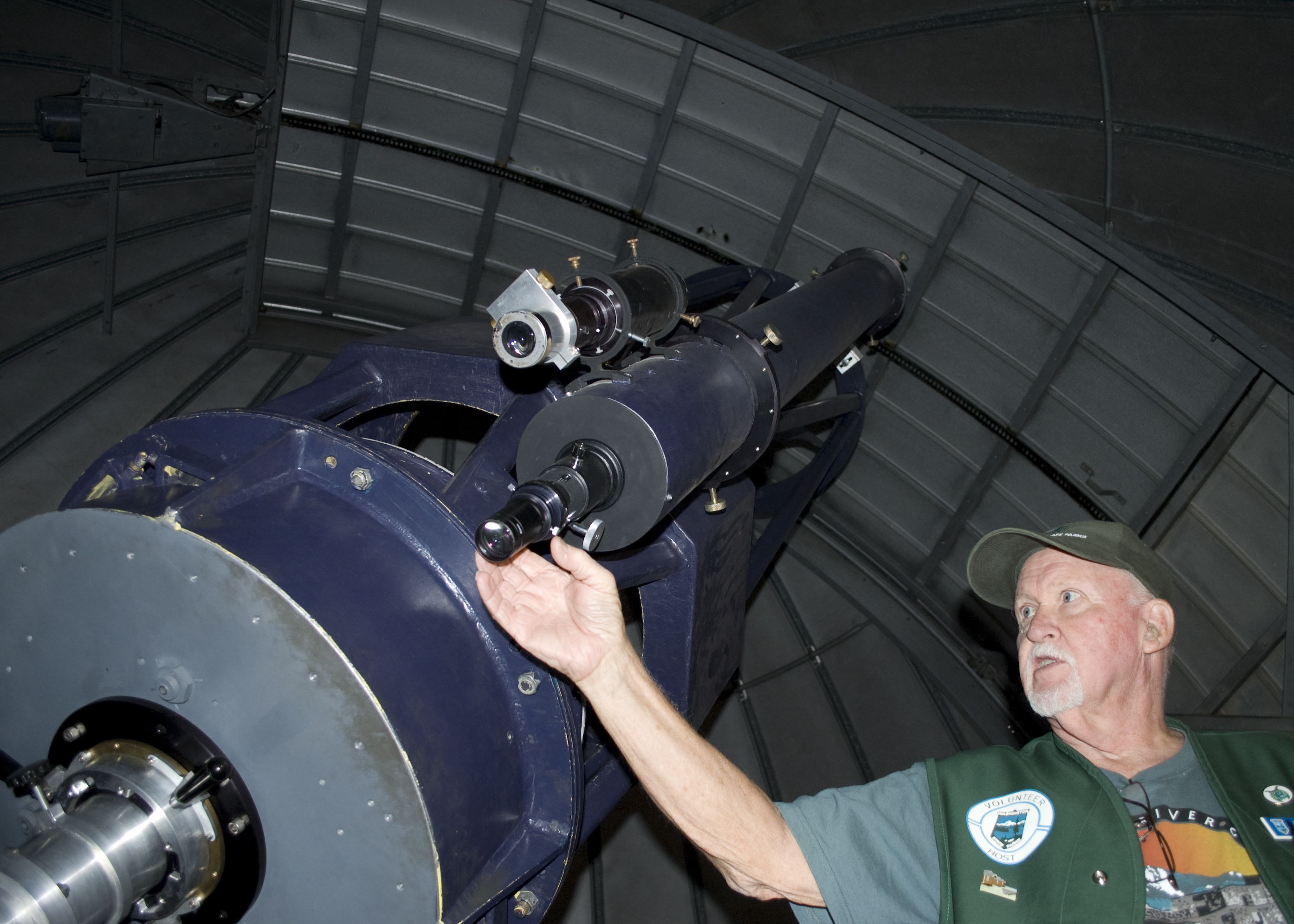
The main instrument is accessible to the general public.

In 2010, the Goldendale Observatory State Park, with the support of Steven Stout who directed the observatory for 32 years and the non-profit Friends of Goldendale Observatory, became the sixth International Dark Sky Park in the world. It was also the second state park in the United States to receive this designation by the International Dark-Sky Association (IDA).

In late 2016, the IDA suspended the park for lack of compliance with their requirements. The IDA removed the dark-sky designation in 2017, the only time they have decertified a site. In the spring of 2017 the reconstruction of the observatory, with new lighting and signs, was expected to be completed by the fall of 2017 and dark sky status restored. However, that was later delayed to 2019 when Washington State Parks stated it would attempt to re-establish the Goldendale Observatory State Park as an International Dark-Sky Association (IDA) Dark Sky Park. Nevertheless, Washington State Parks later stated that they are no longer interested in this status for Goldendale Observatory State Park, and they would go out of their way to avoid such a designation.

== See also ==
- List of astronomical observatories
