= Lone Butte (Washington) =

Volcano

Coordinates: 46°03′16″N 121°50′21″W

Lone Butte is a 4,780 foot (1,460 m) tuya in the Indian Heaven volcanic field, Washington, United States. It is part of the Pacific Ring of Fire.

Lone Butte last erupted during either the Hayden Creek glaciation 130,000-150,000 years ago (late Illinoian), or 70,000-90,000 years ago during the early Wisconsin glaciation.
