= U.S. Route 97 Alternate =

Highway in Washington

U.S. Route 97 Alternate
- Map of Chelan County with US 97A highlighted in red

Route information
- Maintained by WSDOT
- Length: 39.95 mi (64.29 km)
- Existed: 1987–present
- Tourist routes: Cascade Loop Scenic Byway

Major junctions
- South end: US 2 / US 97 in Sunnyslope
- SR 971 near Entiat; SR 150 in Chelan
- North end: US 97 near Chelan

Location
- Country: United States
- State: Washington
- County: Chelan

Highway system
- United States Numbered Highway System; List; Special; Divided; State highways in Washington; Interstate; US; State; Scenic; Pre-1964; 1964 renumbering; Former
← US 97	→ SR 99

U.S. Route 97 Alternate (US 97 Alt., also abbreviated as US 97A) is an alternate route of US 97 within the state of Washington. It runs for 40 miles (64 km) from Wenatchee to Chelan, following the west bank of the Columbia River opposite from US 2 and US 97. The highway travels through sparsely populated areas along the river and passes near the Rocky Reach Dam and through the town of Entiat.

Wagon roads along the west side of the Columbia River were plotted in the 1880s by American settlers and added to the state highway system in 1897. The wagon road was designated as State Road 10 (later the Lake Chelan and Okanogan Highway) and was completely paved by the late 1930s. US 97 was created in 1926 and followed the highway, which was relocated in the 1950s due to the construction of the Rocky Reach Dam. A highway on the east side of the river was completed in the 1980s and designated as part of US 97 in 1987, leaving the west side to become an alternate route.

== Route description ==
US 97A begins north of Wenatchee at a partial cloverleaf interchange with US 2 and US 97 at the west end of the Richard Odabashian Bridge. US 2 and US 97 travel concurrently through the area on an east–west divided highway, while the roadway itself continues south towards Wenatchee Confluence State Park as Euclid Avenue. US 97A travels north alongside the Cascade and Columbia River Railroad on the west bank of the Columbia River, passing through an industrial area and intersecting Ohme Garden Road at a roundabout. The highway narrows to two lanes and moves closer to the river, abutting the steep slopes of the Entiat Mountains to the west. Along this section of the river, US 97A passes Rocky Reach Dam and its visitor center, located opposite Lincoln Rock State Park on US 2 and US 97.

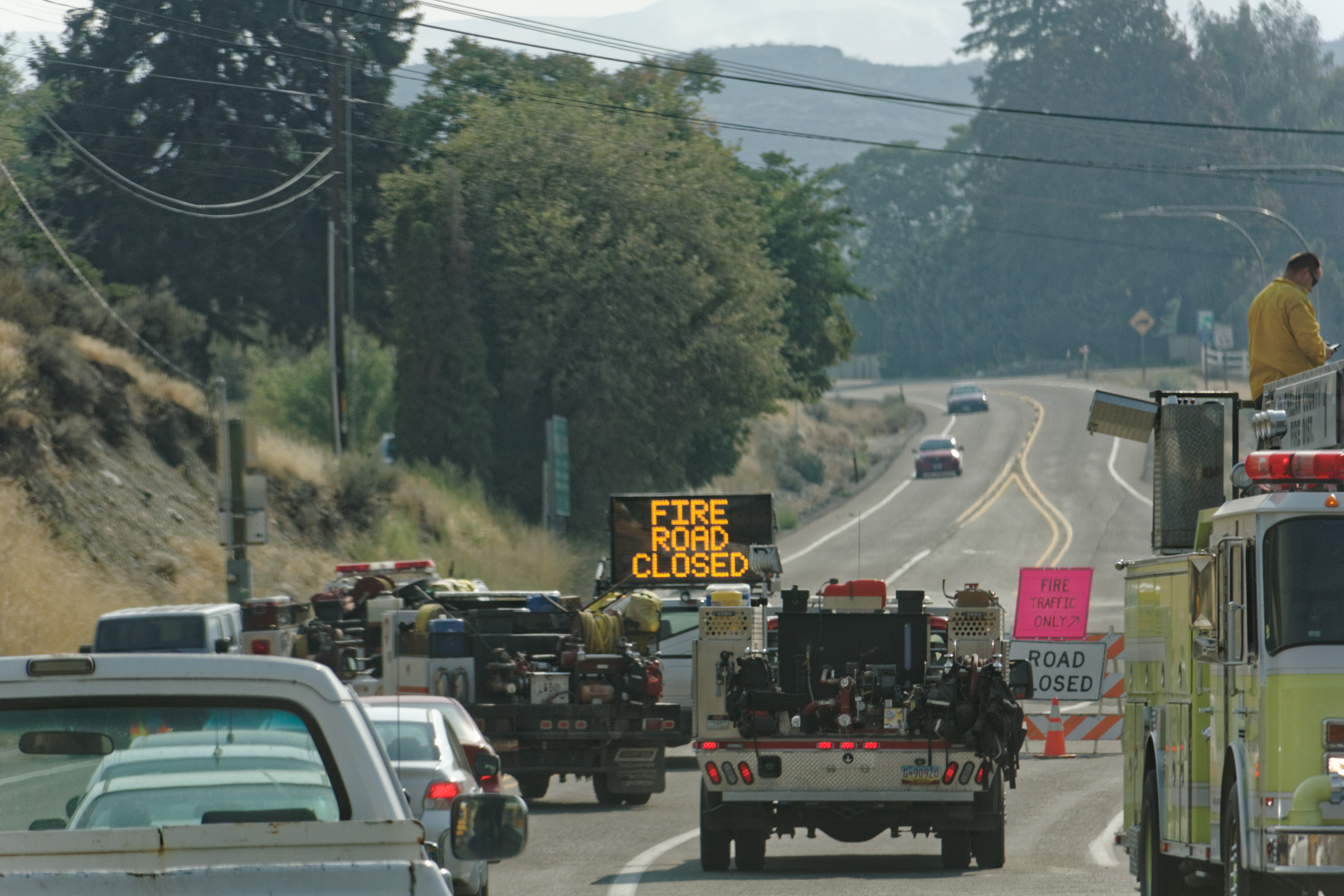
Looking eastbound from downtown Chelan at a closed section of US 97A during 2015 wildfire season

The highway continues northeast alongside the Columbia River and Lake Entiat, passing several resort communities on the riverbank. US 97A and the railroad move closer to the riverbank near Tenas George Canyon and gradually turn north, crossing several creeks that empty into the lake. Near Numeral Mountain, the highway crosses over the mouth of the Entiat River and enters the city limits of Entiat. US 97A travels to the west of several waterfront parks and recreation areas and skirts the east edge of the city's main commercial and residential neighborhoods. The highway passes the Columbia Breaks Fire Interpretive Center and continues out of the city, continuing along the river as it bends eastward near Winesap. The mountains to the west of US 97A form part of the Chelan Wildlife Area, which stretches along the west side of the river from Wenatchee to Chelan.

At the mouth of Navarre Coulee, the highway intersects the south end of SR 971, which travels north to Lake Chelan State Park. US 97A continues northeast for a short distance before leaving the river and railroad at Knapp's Hill, which the highway crosses under with a short tunnel. The highway turns north to follow Knapp Coulee, which lies at the eastern edge of the Wenatchee National Forest, and passes through a vineyard and zipline park. US 97A ascends into the coulee's narrower reaches, gaining a northbound climbing lane, and then descends while turning northeast towards the shore of Lake Chelan near the Bear Mountain Ranch golf course. After a stair-step turn to the east and north adjacent to several wineries, the highway intersects the north end of SR 971 and turns east onto Woodin Avenue. US 97A continues east along the foothills of the Chelan Butte and enters the city of Chelan near Lakeside Park.

Woodin Avenue passes several resort hotels, a marina, and a terminal for the Lady of the Lake ferry that travels to Stehekin. Near Chelan High School, Woodin Avenue splits from US 97A, which continues east onto Webster Avenue and crosses over the Chelan River near the Lake Chelan Dam. The highway then turns north onto Sanders Street and east onto Woodin Avenue, beginning a concurrency with SR 150 as it leaves downtown Chelan. US 97A and SR 150 pass through a commercial strip before splitting near the eastern outskirts of the city, with US 97A continuing northeast into the hills overlooking the Columbia River. The highway crosses part of the Gallagher Flat State Wildlife Recreation Area and travels just south of the Lake Chelan Airport before terminating at a junction with US 97 southwest of Azwell.

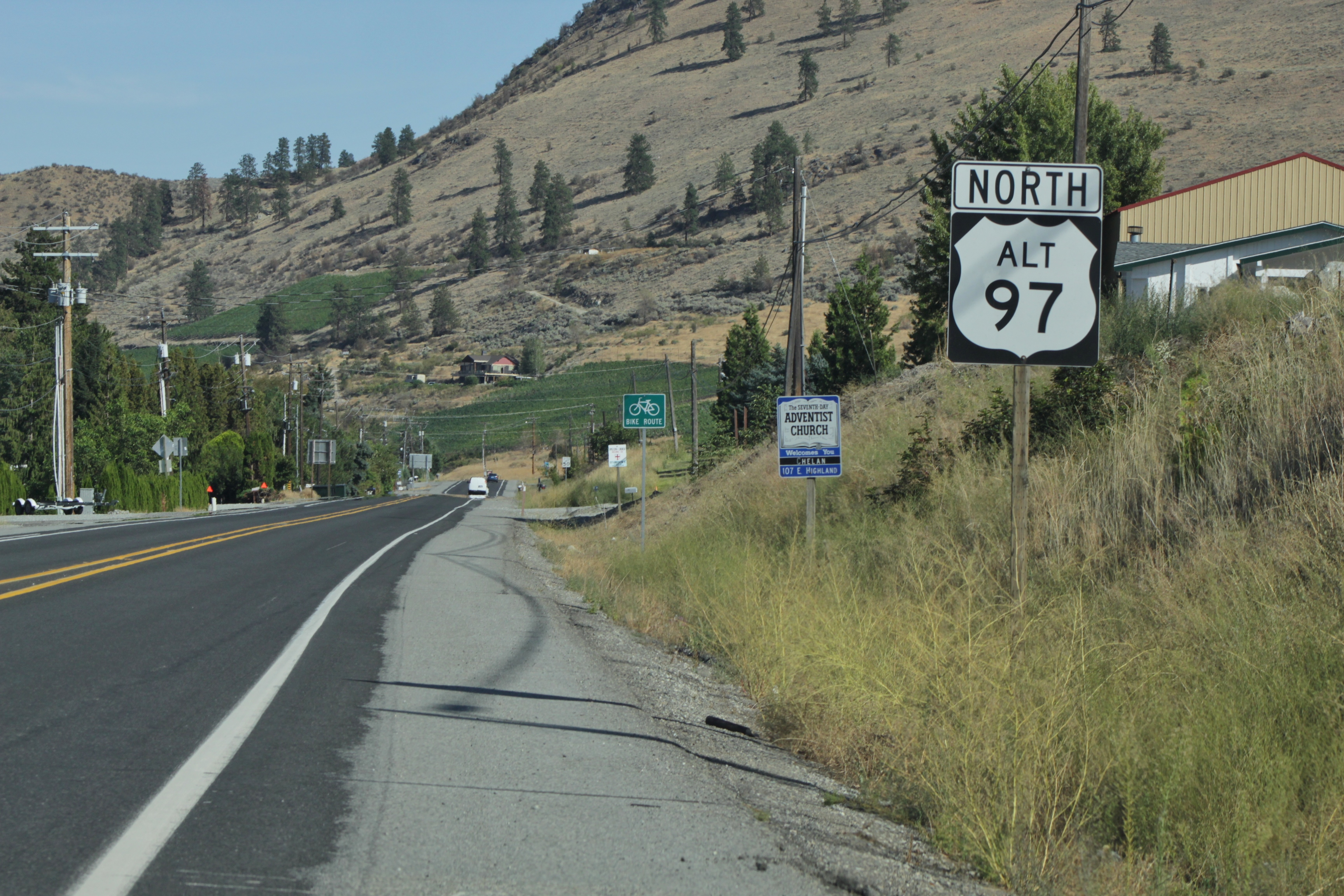
A reassurance marker for US 97A near Chelan

US 97A uses mileposts derived from US 97, beginning at 200 and ending at 240. In addition to carrying agricultural freight, the highway is a tourist route and is signed as part of the Cascade Loop Scenic Byway. The highway is maintained by the Washington State Department of Transportation (WSDOT), which conducts an annual survey on state routes to measure traffic volume in terms of annual average daily traffic. Average traffic volumes on US 97A range from a minimum of 2,800 vehicles at its eastern terminus northeast of Chelan to a maximum of 12,000 in downtown Chelan. A short section between US 2 and the Ohme Garden Road roundabout is designated as part of the National Highway System, a network of roads identified as important to the national economy, defense, and mobility. Link Transit operates daily bus service on the corridor, connecting Wenatchee to Entiat, Chelan, and Manson.

== History ==
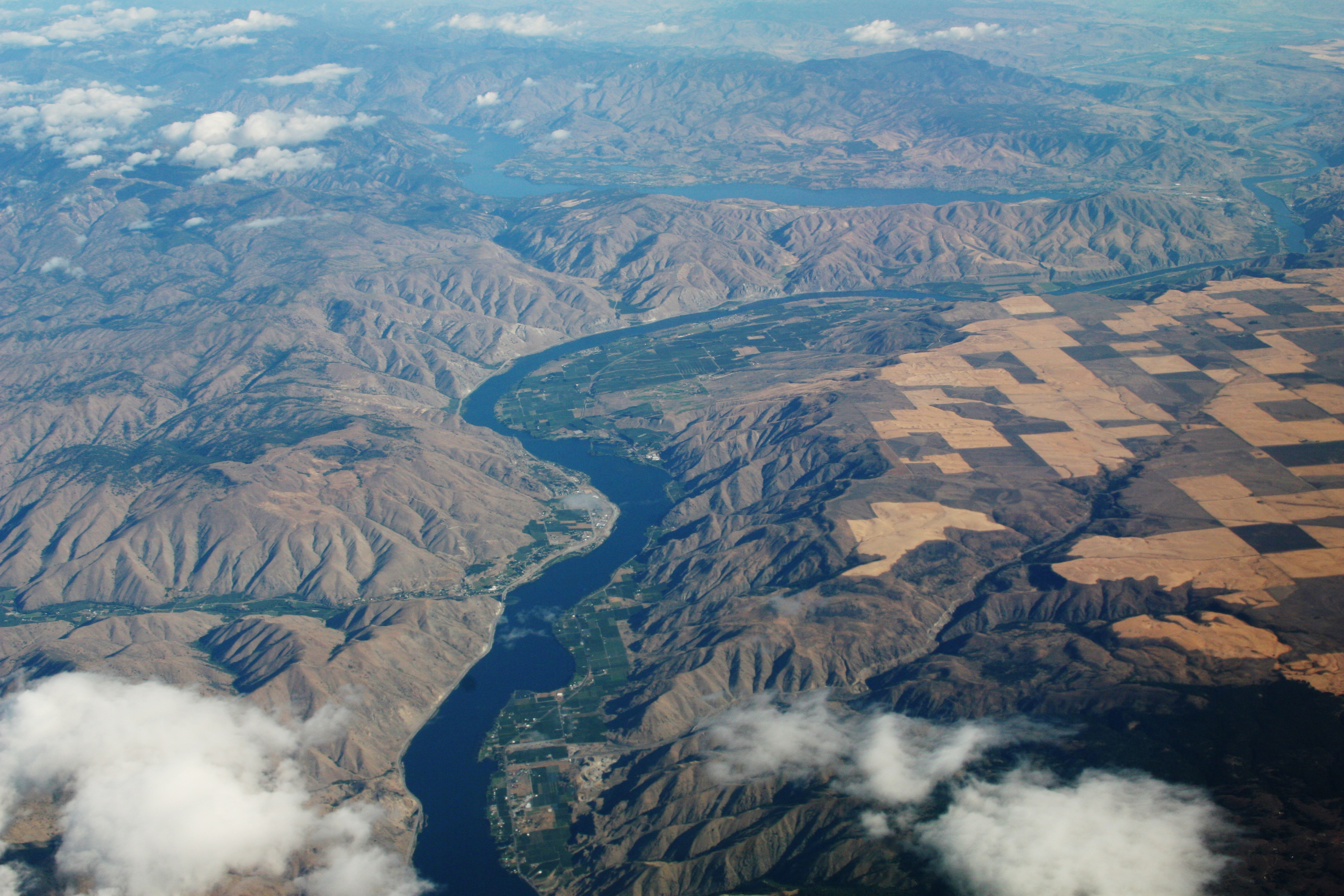
Aerial view of Lake Entiat, a reservoir created by the Rocky Reach Dam that inundated former sections of US 97

The first wagon roads along the Columbia River were built by American settlers in the 1880s and followed earlier routes plotted by indigenous peoples and explorers like George McClellan in the mid-19th century. The west side of the river was once used as an overland route by fur traders in the 1850s and constituted part of the Okanagan Trail and the Cariboo Trail. A wagon road on the west side of the river was added to the state highway system in 1897, connecting Wenatchee to Twisp, and a sum of $15,000 (equivalent to $485,000 in 2024 dollars) was appropriated to Kittitas and Okanogan counties for construction.

The Wenatchee–Pateros section of the wagon road was assigned in 1905 as part of State Road 10, which continued north along the Okanogan River to the Canadian border. Within the next three years, State Road 10 was improved using state funds, including $20,000 (equivalent to $498,000 in 2024 dollars) allocated to Chelan County for the Wenatchee–Pateros section, particularly the southern stretch through Entiat. By 1915, Chelan County had improved the road surface between Wenatchee and Maple Creek, southwest of the city of Chelan, and the Great Northern Railway had begun negotiations to purchase the highway's right-of-way for a new railroad connecting Wenatchee to Okanogan. The railway company rebuilt the highway, relocating it inland to make way for its railroad, at a cost of $150,000 (equivalent to $3.46 million in 2024 dollars) per an agreement it reached with the state highway commission. State Road 10 was renamed to the Lake Chelan and Okanogan Highway by a legislative act in 1917 and moved to the east side of the river in 1923, ending a decade-long debate on where the highway should run.

US 97 was created as part of the initial system of numbered national highways in 1926, running from Ashland, Oregon, to the Canadian border near Oroville. The highway was co-signed with State Road 10 from Wenatchee to the border. State Road 10 was relocated to its original alignment on the west side of the Columbia River, which had been improved with oiled macadam surfacing, and was later signed as Primary State Highway 10 (PSH 10) in the 1937 reformation of the state highway system. By the end of the 1930s, the entirety of US 97 and PSH 10 had been paved in concrete and asphalt. A notoriously hilly section of the highway at Maple Creek was replaced by the Knapp's Hill Tunnel, which opened in 1936.

The development of hydroelectric dams on the Columbia River began in the 1930s and expanded after the end of World War II. The planned reservoir created by the Rocky Reach Dam, located near Orondo, would inundate 20 miles (32 km) of shoreline, including the city of Entiat and sections of PSH 10 and the adjacent Great Northern Railway. Construction of the dam began in 1956 and several contracts were awarded two years later for the uphill relocation of the highway, which began shortly afterward. The new, 18-mile (29 km) section of the highway between the dam and Knapp's Hill was constructed in one year, opening in November 1959 at a cost of $8 million (equivalent to $65.7 million in 2024 dollars), and involved several large cuts in the nearby hills. During the 1964 state highway renumbering, PSH 10 was fully replaced by US 97, while the unfinished highway on the east side of the river between Wenatchee and Chelan Falls became US 2 and SR 151.

A "water-grade" route for US 97 along the east bank of the Columbia River was envisioned in the 1940s and was constructed in sections as part of improvements to SR 151. These improvements included a new alignment for the highway during construction of the Rocky Reach Dam and a new bridge crossing at Chelan Falls. The $14.6 million alignment (equivalent to $36 million in 2024 dollars) following the river for 5.3 miles (8.5 km) between Chelan Falls and Azwell was opened in September 1985, completing the water-grade route along the Columbia River. The state legislature moved US 97 to the east bank route in 1987 and designated the old highway on the west bank as US 97 Alternate. The redesignation was controversial with Chelan and Entiat businessmen, who feared a loss of business and traffic along the alternate route, but the state government cited predicted traffic volumes as its main determinant for the signing of US 97 onto the eastern route. The change was submitted to the Special Committee on U.S. Route Numbering, a group within the American Association of State Highway and Transportation Officials (AASHTO) that coordinates the numbering of national highways, and was approved at their June 1988 meeting after being initially withheld.

In May 1995, a major landslide near the Rocky Reach Dam covered a section of the highway with 30 feet (9.1 m) of debris and killed two people. The alternate route was identified in the 1990s as a particularly dangerous highway for single-vehicle collisions, most involving drunk drivers or encounters with deer and elk. WSDOT tallied more than 400 deer killed in collisions with automobiles from 1991 to 1998 and dozens of sheep and elk, prompting plans to install a wildlife fence on US 97A near the Rocky Reach Dam to deter highway crossings. The 9-mile (14 km) wildlife fence was installed between 2009 and 2011 after several years of delays while waiting for $2.8 million in funding from the federal and state government.

A two-mile (3.2 km) section of US 97A in Sunnyslope was rebuilt and repaved by WSDOT in 2013 and included the construction of a roundabout at Ohme Garden Road to aid freight traffic. The Wenatchee city government plans to construct an extension of the highway across the Wenatchee River and into the city as part of the Confluence Parkway project.

== Major intersections ==
The entire highway is in Chelan County.

Location	mi	km	Destinations	Notes
Sunnyslope	0.00	0.00	US 2 / US 97 to SR 28 – East Wenatchee, Spokane, Wenatchee, Seattle	Interchange; continues south as Euclid Avenue
	23.35	37.58	SR 971 north (Navarre Coulee Road) – Lake Chelan State Park, 25 Mile Creek	
	30.60	49.25	SR 971 south (South Lakeshore Road) – Lake Chelan State Park, 25 Mile Creek	
Chelan	34.46	55.46	SR 150 west (Sanders Street) – Manson	South end of SR 150 overlap
Chelan	35.29	56.79	SR 150 east	North end of SR 150 overlap
	39.95	64.29	US 97 – Okanogan, Wenatchee	
1.000 mi = 1.609 km; 1.000 km = 0.621 mi: Concurrency terminus
