= U.S. Route 97 in Washington =

Segment of American highway

U.S. Route 97
- US 97 highlighted in red.

Route information
- Maintained by WSDOT
- Length: 321.62 mi (517.60 km)
- Existed: 1926–present
- Tourist routes: Cascade Loop Scenic Byway; Okanogan Trails Scenic Byway, Swiftwater Corridor Scenic Byway, Yakima Scenic Byway

Major junctions
- South end: US 97 at the Oregon state line in Maryhill
- SR 14 in Maryhill; SR 22 in Toppenish; I-82 / US 12 in Union Gap; US 12 in Yakima; I-90 near Ellensburg; US 2 near Peshastin; SR 28 in East Wenatchee; SR 17 near Brewster; SR 20 near Okanogan
- North end: Highway 97 at the Canadian border near Oroville

Location
- Country: United States
- State: Washington
- Counties: Klickitat, Yakima, Kittitas, Chelan, Douglas, Okanogan

Highway system
- United States Numbered Highway System; List; Special; Divided; State highways in Washington; Interstate; US; State; Scenic; Pre-1964; 1964 renumbering; Former
| ← SR 96 | → SR 99 |

U.S. Route 97 (US 97) in the U.S. state of Washington is a 322-mile (518 km) route which traverses from the Oregon state line at the northern end of the Sam Hill Memorial Bridge in Maryhill, north to the Canada–US border in Okanogan County near Oroville. The highway serves major cities such as Goldendale, Yakima, Ellensburg and Wenatchee before continuing towards the Alaska Highway at the Yukon border as British Columbia Highway 97. Along the length of the roadway, US 97 is concurrent with State Route 14 (SR 14) in Maryhill, Interstate 82 (I-82) and US 12 between Union Gap and Ellensburg, I-90 briefly in Ellensburg, US 2 between Peshastin and rural Douglas County and SR 20 near Omak. An alternate route connects the highway with Chelan.

The first segment of what is now US 97 in Washington to be included in the state highway system was a road extending from Wenatchee to Twisp, designated in 1897. Since, four early highways formed the modern route of the roadway: State Road 8, State Road 3, State Road 2 and State Road 10, all signed in 1923. The United States Numbered Highways were established in 1926 and US 97 was co-signed with all four state roads, including two concurrencies with US 410 and US 10. The state roads became Primary state highways in 1937, keeping their numbers from the previous system and US 10 was moved south in 1940 and its original alignment, including the concurrency, became US 2 in 1946. The Sam Hill Memorial Bridge, originally named the Biggs Rapids Bridge, was first opened on November 1, 1962, but the river has been crossed by a ferry at the same location since the early 1920s. During the 1964 highway renumbering, all four highways were replaced by US 97 and in 1956, the Interstate Highway System was established, including two highways (I-82 and I-90) concurrent with US 97. US 12 replaced US 410 during its extension west in 1967. In 1987, US 97 was moved across the Columbia River in Chelan County, establishing US 97 Alternate and decommissioning SR 151. Until 2006, US 197 was co-signed with SR 14 between Dallesport and Maryhill. The bridge deck was replaced between 2007 and 2009 and the bridge was closed in 2008. Five other minor projects, such as repavings and sidewalk additions, have already been completed, but eight projects have yet to be completed.

== Route description ==
US 97 is a major highway in Washington that spans 322-mile (518.209 km) and consists of mostly two lanes; it is undivided except for the sections that are in urban areas, such as Wenatchee, and concurrencies with I-82 and I-90. The entire route from the Oregon state line to the Canada–US border is part of the National Highway System, a system of roadways classified as important to the nation's economy, defense and mobility. At the southern terminus of the I-82 – US 12 concurrency in Union Gap, US 97 had an estimated daily average of 20,000 crossings in 2007, making it both the busiest segment of the highway in Washington and the fifth busiest segment of U.S. routes in Washington. The busiest segment of US 97 in 1970 was at Main Street in Selah, with a daily average of 17,100 motorists.

Several portions of US 97 carry official designations conferred by the state legislature or the Washington State Transportation Commission at the request of local governments and groups. The section in Klickitat County was designated as the World War II Veterans Memorial Highway in 2020; the same designation was applied to the Douglas County section in 2022.

=== Oregon to Ellensburg ===
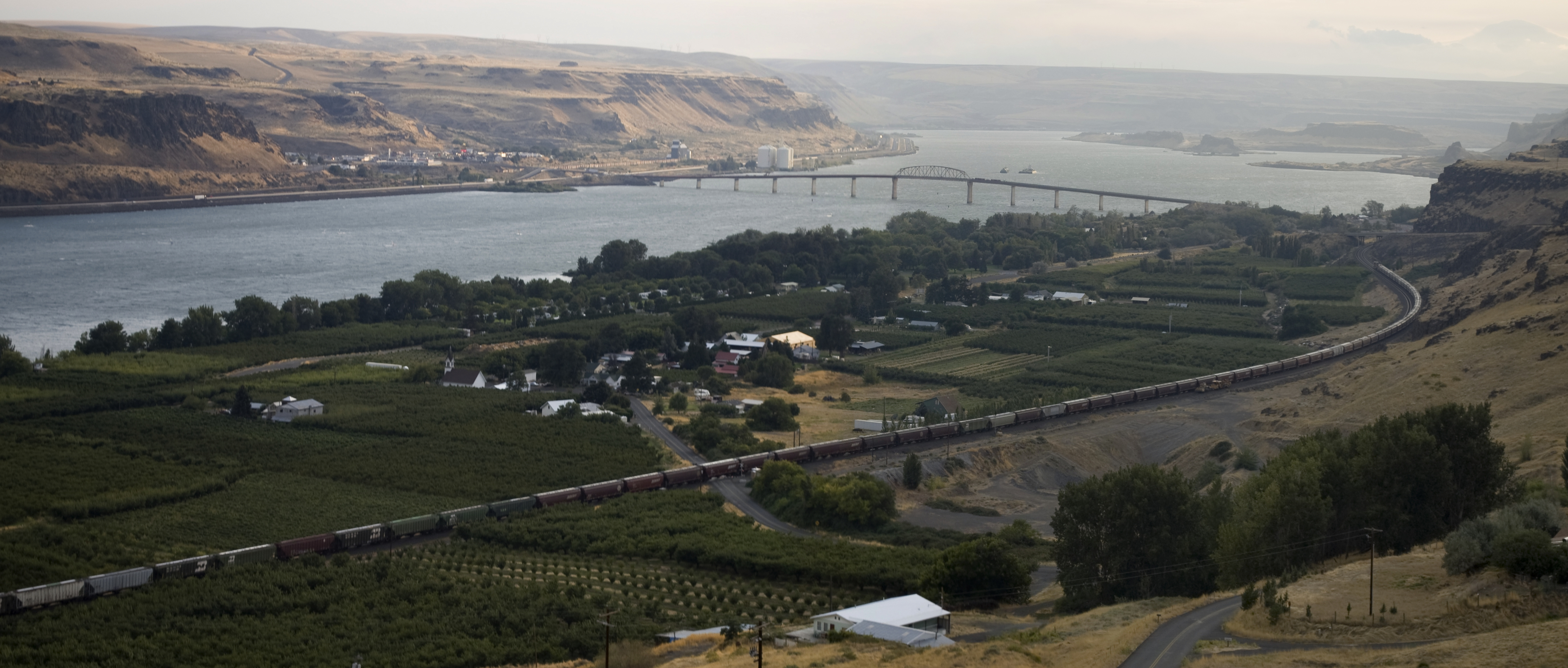
An aerial view of Maryhill, the first community on US 97, where the highway travels over the Columbia River on the Sam Hill Memorial Bridge, visible in the background.

US 97 enters Washington on the Sam Hill Memorial Bridge, which crosses the Columbia River between Biggs Junction, Oregon, and Maryhill, Washington. The bridge is immediately north of an interchange with I-84 and US 30 on the Oregon side of the river. After crossing the bridge, the highway turns east to serve Maryhill State Park and crosses over the BNSF Railway's Fallbridge Subdivision, a major railroad that also carries part of Amtrak's Empire Builder passenger service. US 97 ascends from the Columbia River Gorge and turns north near a Stonehenge replica to intersect State Route 14 (SR 14), a riverside highway between Vancouver and the Tri-Cities that US 97 briefly follows west in a concurrency.

The highway leaves SR 14 and its spur route to continue northeast into the Columbia Hills by following Davies Pass, parallel to the historic Maryhill Loops Road. US 97 reaches a plateau at the top of the hills and heads north, passing the Windy Point/Windy Flats and Big Horn wind farms and skirting the east side of Goldendale, where it intersects SR 142. The highway passes Goldendale Observatory State Park and follows the Little Kickitat River northeast into the Simcoe Mountains, traversing a lodgepole pine forest and serving a small Greek Orthodox monastery and Brooks Memorial State Park. It then crosses the Simcoe Mountains at Satus Pass, 3,107 feet (947 m) above sea level, and enters the Yakama Indian Reservation.

US 97 descends from the mountains by following Satus Creek northeast through the semi-arid steppe hills of southern Yakima County. The highway makes a series of turns to cross a gap in the Toppenish Ridge and enter the Yakima Valley, passing through the Toppenish National Wildlife Refuge and irrigated farmland. US 97 then reaches the outskirts of Toppenish, where it intersects SR 22 and turns northwest onto a four-lane divided highway. The highway continues northwest around Wapato and follows a railroad on the south side of Yakima River, opposite from I-82. US 97 turns northeast to run along the river bank through a gap between the Ahtanum Ridge and Rattlesnake Hills and merges with I-82 south of the city of Union Gap. A triple concurrency is formed on the freeway, carrying I-82, US 97, and US 12 around the east side of Yakima and through a junction with SR 24.

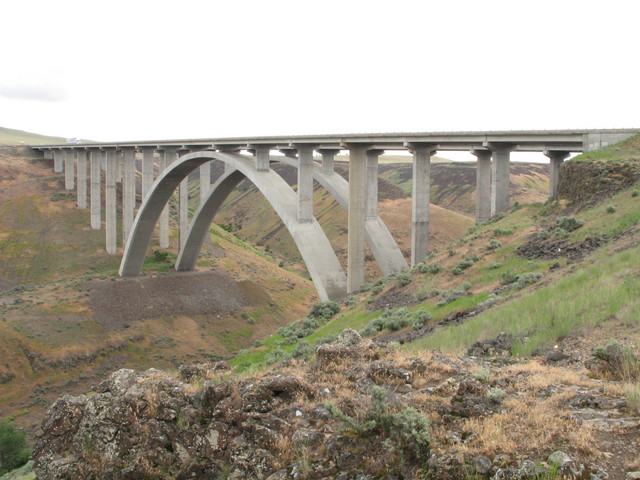
I-82 and US 97 pass over Selah Creek on the Fred G. Redmon Bridge north of Selah.

US 12 leaves the concurrency at an interchange in northern Yakima to travel west towards White Pass while I-82/US 97 continues north across the Naches and Yakima rivers. The freeway crosses the rivers at a narrow gap in Selah Ridge and is separated by SR 823, which runs in the median and intersects I-82/US 97 on the south side of Selah. The freeway turns northeast and continues around Selah, intersecting SR 821 at the south end of the Yakima Canyon Highway. I-82/US 97 crosses Selah Creek on the Fred G. Redmon Bridge, a twinned concrete arch bridge that was the longest of its kind in the United States when it was built. The freeway ascends the Umtanum and Manastash ridges as it passes near the Yakima Firing Center and through undeveloped areas. It then descends into the Kittitas Valley, intersecting SR 821 again and turning north to reach the terminus of I-82 at an interchange with I-90 southeast of Ellensburg.

=== Ellensburg to Canada ===
US 97 turns west to overlap with I-90 as it bypasses Ellensburg and follows the Yakima River upstream towards the Cascade Range. The concurrency ends in the western outskirts of Ellensburg, as US 97 briefly uses a section of University Way before turning north at a roundabout. The highway turns northwest after crossing the BNSF Stampede Subdivision and reaches a junction with SR 10 near Thorp, where it turns north. US 97 continues along a ridge with wind turbines and quarries at the edge of the Kittitas Valley and intersects SR 970 at Virden before entering the Wenatchee National Forest. It then follows Swauk Creek as it ascends into the Wenatchee Mountains (part of the Cascade Range), passing several trailheads, campgrounds, and the former townsite of Liberty.

The highway turns east to reach Blewett Pass, its highest point at 4,102 feet (1,250 m) above sea level, and crosses into Chelan County. It then descends from the pass by following Tronsen and Peshastin creeks north into the Wenatchee Valley. US 97 reaches an interchange with US 2 near Peshastin and turns southeast to form a concurrency. The four-lane divided highway follows the Wenatchee River downstream through Dryden and around Cashmere towards the city of Wenatchee. North of the city, US 2/US 97 passes through interchanges with SR 285, the main connector into downtown Wenatchee, and US 97 Alternate (US 97A) as it turns east to cross the Columbia River on the Richard Odabashian Bridge.

US 2/US 97 enters Douglas County and turns north at a junction with SR 28, which continues through East Wenatchee towards Quincy. The highway follows the east side of the Columbia River, opposite from US 97A on the west side and along Badger Mountain, and passes the Rocky Reach Dam at the head of Lake Entiat and the adjacent Lincoln Rock State Park. US 2 leaves US 97 at a split junction in Orondo that includes a short spur route. The highway continues north and east along the Columbia River, passing Daroga State Park and several apple orchards on the edge of the Waterville Plateau. US 97 crosses the Columbia River on the Beebe Bridge near Chelan Falls and intersects SR 150, which connects to the city of Chelan on Lake Chelan.

The highway re-enters Chelan County and follows the west bank of the Columbia River, merging with US 97A northeast of downtown Chelan. US 97 continues north, passing the Wells Dam at Azwell, and enters Okanogan County near Alta Lake State Park. It then intersects SR 153 before traveling through Pateros at the mouth of the Methow River. The highway continues northeast along the river to Brewster, where it intersects SR 173 before turning east towards Anderson Field. After a junction with SR 17 near the historic site of Fort Okanogan, US 97 turns north to follow the east bank of the Okanogan River in the Colville Indian Reservation. The highway travels along the river as it rounds Soap Lake Mountain, intersecting unsigned SR 213 near Malott, and reaches an intersection with SR 20 on the southern outskirts of Okanogan.

US 97 and SR 20 form a concurrency as they bypass Okanogan and serve the county fairgrounds and 12 Tribes Omak Casino. The highway also bypasses Omak, intersecting SR 155 via its spur route, and crosses the Okanogan River to leave the Colville Indian Reservation. US 97/SR 20 then intersects SR 215, which provides local access through Okanogan and Omak and is co-signed with a business route. The highway continues northeast to rejoin the river, following its west bank until the town of Riverside, where it splits to use Wagonroad Coulee. US 97 crosses the Okanogan River and follows its east bank into Tonasket, where the concurrency ends and SR 20 turns east to cross the Okanogan Highlands. The highway continues north along the river to another crossing near the mouth of the Similkameen River south of Oroville. US 97 travels through Oroville and along the west side of Osoyoos Lake to the 24-hour Oroville–Osoyoos crossing on the Canadian border, where it terminates. Beyond the border, the roadway continues as British Columbia Highway 97, which serves several cities in the British Columbia Interior and later forms part of the Alaska Highway.

== History ==
=== Late 19th and early 20th centuries ===
The first segment of US 97 to be included in Washington's state highway system was a roadway extending from Wenatchee to Twisp, although the US 97 segment ended in Pateros, established in 1897. In 1905, another road from Pateros to Okanogan was added to the system, which would be extended to the Canada–US border in 1907. That roadway from Wenatchee to Canada, was named the Wenatchee-Oroville Road and numbered State Road 10. A different road, located along the Oregon state line on the Columbia River, was established as State Road 8, the Columbia River Road and ran north from Maryhill to Goldendale.

Six years later, in 1913, State Road 7 was created on a Virden–Wenatchee route. The Inland Empire Highway was established in 1915 and the section it overlapped with present-day US 97 ran from Buena northwest to Ellensburg. State Road 2 replaced State Road 7 in 1919 and a branch, the Southern Division of the Sunset Highway, was established in 1919 and ran south from State Road 2 at Virden to Ellensburg.

During the early 1920s, a ferry was established over the Columbia River between Biggs Junction, Oregon and Maryhill. State Road 8 between Goldendale and Buena was established in 1923. US 97 was established along with the rest of the U.S. routes in 1926, including US 10 and US 410, which were concurrent with US 97. All state roads became Primary state highways in 1937 and they kept their numbers; a branch of Primary State Highway 8 (PSH 8) was also established, connecting the Maryhill ferry to PSH 8 in Maryhill. Another concurrency was added in 1946, when US 2 was extended west, co-signed with US 97 between Peshastin and Wenatchee.

=== Late 20th century ===
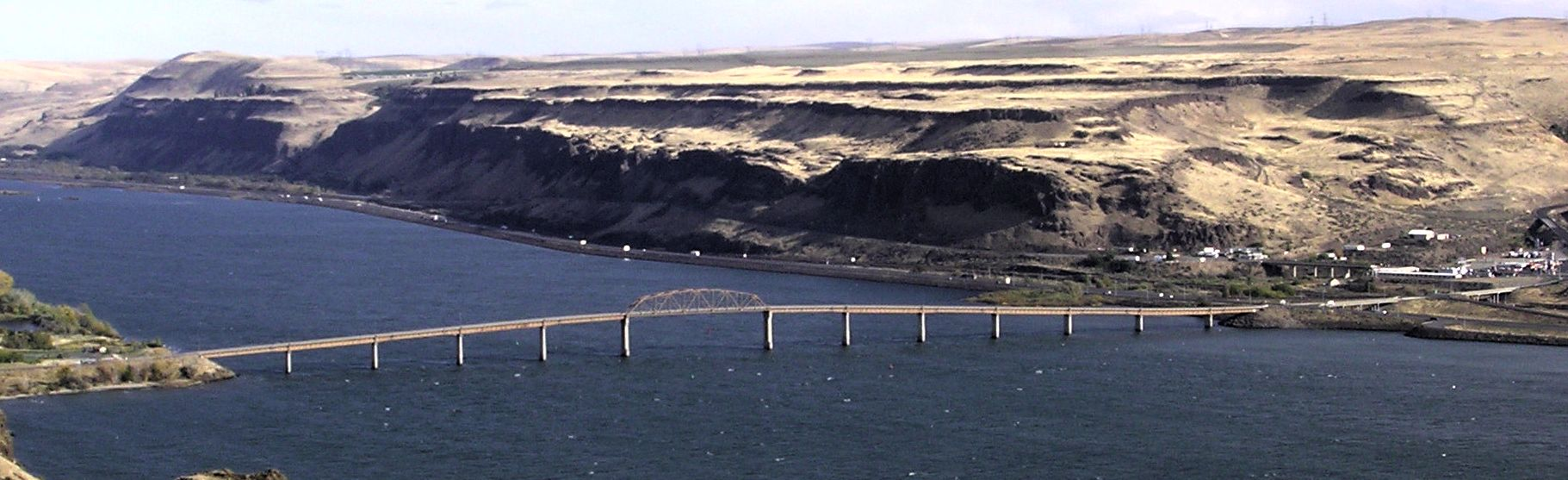
A panoramic view of the Sam Hill Memorial Bridge, which carries US 97 over the Columbia River into Oregon. The bridge opened on November 1, 1962, as the Biggs Rapids Bridge and the deck was replaced between October 2007 and March 2009.

In the original alignment, US 97 went straight north from Brewster on the west side of the Okanogan River, through the center of Okanogan, Omak, and Riverside before joining its current alignment. The alignment shifted to a new highway on the east side of the river, bypassing Okanogan and Omak, which opened in 1964. The new alignment took the highway east from Brewster to cross the river and remained on that side of the river until Omak.

On June 29, 1956, President Dwight D. Eisenhower signed the Federal Aid Highway Act of 1956 into law, establishing a system of freeways that would later become the Interstate Highway System. Included in the system were Interstate 82 (I-82) and I-90, which were to be concurrent with US 97. The Biggs Rapids Bridge (later renamed to the Sam Hill Memorial Bridge) was opened on November 1, 1962, replacing the ferry that had been operating on the route since the early 1920s. A new system of highways was introduced in 1964 and ultimately caused US 97 to replace the Primary state highways.

US 410 was replaced by a western extension of US 12 in 1967, when the highway's western terminus was moved to Aberdeen. In 1973, a segment of US 97 between Selah and Ellensburg was realigned east away from the Yakima River and onto I-82, while the former route became SR 821. Between US 97 / US 10, which would later be decommissioned by 1970, near Thorp and US 97 in Virden, there was a SR 131. In 1975, US 97 replaced SR 131 and the old route became SR 10 and SR 970. SR 131 would later be assigned on another route in the Randle area in 1991. Within Selah, US 97 was also moved onto I-82 away from the city, so the old route became SR 823 in 1984. Prior to 1987, US 97 ran on the west side of the Columbia River between Wenatchee and Chelan, while SR 151 ran on the east side. US 97 was moved onto SR 151 in 1987 and the old US 97 became US 97 Alternate.

=== Early 21st century ===
Beginning in 2006, the Washington State Department of Transportation (WSDOT) has completed five construction projects on the US 97 corridor, ranging from a bridge deck replacement in Maryhill to repaving the roadway between Oroville area and Canada. Construction on a three-part project to install guardrails on dangerous portions of the highway began on May 16, 2006. The project was finished on August 17, 2006, and improved a 32-mile (51 km) segment near Blewett Pass, a 18-mile (29 km) section in the Colville Indian Reservation and a 20-mile (32.19 km) segment between Riverside and Oroville.

Prior to October 5, 2006, US 197, an auxiliary route of US 97, ended at US 97, co-signed with SR 14, in Maryhill. On October 5, the American Association of State Highway and Transportation Officials (AASHTO) decommissioned US 197 between Dallesport and Maryhill. Between 29 May and September 28, 2007, WSDOT repaved the roadway between Cordell, located south of Oroville, and the Canada–US border. In July 2008, WSDOT completed installing guardrails on the road in Klickitat County. Between August 11 and December 5, 2008, WSDOT added sidewalks and illumination along a 0.59-mile (0.95 km) long stretch of the highway between Main Street and SR 173 in Brewster.

Since the opening of the Sam Hill Memorial Bridge in 1962, the bridge has used a lightweight concrete and asphalt bridge deck. Now, the bridge is a heavily used truck route and requires a heavy concrete deck. In late 2006, a replacement project was planned and the estimated $16 million USD cost was split between the governments of Washington and Oregon. The whole bridge was replaced by WSDOT, including the Oregon side. The project was accelerated to Fall 2007, but the bridge wasn't closed until January 2, 2008. During construction on January 15, approximately 8:00 (PST), a worker was seriously injured after an excavator fell into the Columbia River. After the area was cleaned, the project resumed on January 23 and a worker died after falling off the bridge on February 26. By April, half of the new deck was complete and the bridge was reopened on 19 May, at 6:00 pm (PST). Although the bridge was reopened, it was once again closed on September 3 for more repairs. The bridge was reopened on December 24 and all roadwork was completed on March 23, 2009.

=== Future projects ===
As of 2009, eight projects on the corridor have not been completed yet and some are currently under construction. Between April 27 and June 30, completed the second phase of emergency flood repairs to US 97 at Blewett Pass because the 5 – January 6 floods washed out the roadway. The third and final phase is set to begin on August 17. The Janis Bridge was first constructed and completed in 1957 and on June 15, 2009, a construction project to the rehabilitate the bridge deck begam. Construction will cease on July 27. On June 22, construction began on a project to install a new traffic signal at the SR 155 intersection in Okanogan, two variable-message signs and two traffic cameras near the Canada–US border. On July 27, WSDOT will start to fix an unstable slope north of Blewett Pass, 8 miles (13 km) south of the US 2 intersection. Another project set to begin on July 27 to fix an unstable slope on US 97 near Blewett Pass. WSDOT will add a passing lane on the highway at Blewett Pass in summer 2010. The bridge over Satus Creek, located within the Yakama Indian Reservation in Klickitat County was replaced in 2022. A repaving project between Orondo and Chelan Falls has been put on hold until 2016, originally scheduled for 2010.

== Major intersections ==
| County | Location | mi | km | Exit | Destinations | Notes |
|---|---|---|---|---|---|---|
| Columbia River | | 0.00– 0.49 | 0.00– 0.79 | | US 97 south | Continuation into Oregon |
| Columbia River | | 0.00– 0.49 | 0.00– 0.79 | Sam Hill Memorial Bridge | | |
| Klickitat | Maryhill | 2.38 | 3.83 | | SR 14 east – Kennewick | Southern end of SR 14 overlap |
| Klickitat | Maryhill | 2.80 | 4.51 | | SR 14 west – Vancouver | Northern end of SR 14 overlap |
| Klickitat | Goldendale | 13.16 | 21.18 | | SR 142 west – Goldendale, Klickitat | |
| Yakima | Toppenish | 61.30 | 98.65 | | SR 22 to I-82 – Toppenish, Mabton, Prosser | |
| Yakima | Toppenish | 61.84 | 99.52 | | Fort Road – Fort Simcoe State Park | Former WA 220 |
| Yakima | | 75.99 | 122.29 | — | Main Street – Union Gap | Interchange; northbound exit and southbound entrance |
| Yakima | | 76.18 | 122.60 | 37 | I-82 west / US 12 west – Yakima | Southern end of I-82/US 12 overlap; southbound exit and northbound entrance |
| Yakima | US 97 overlaps I-82 and US 12 (exits 37 to 31) | | | | | |
| Yakima | Yakima | 81.76 | 131.58 | 31 | US 12 west – Naches, White Pass | Northern end of US 12 overlap |
US 97 overlaps I-82 (exit 31 to milepost 0.00)
| Kittitas | | 113.99 | 183.45 | 110 | I-90 east – Vantage, Spokane I-82 ends | Northern end of I-82 overlap; southern end of I-90 overlap; no exit number northbound |
| Kittitas | Ellensburg | 114.50 | 184.27 | 109 | Canyon Road – Ellensburg | |
| Kittitas | | 118.80 | 191.19 | 106 | I-90 west – Seattle | Northern end of I-90 overlap |
| Kittitas | | 121.51 | 195.55 | | SR 10 west – Cle Elum | |
| Kittitas | | 134.72 | 216.81 | | SR 970 west to I-90 – Cle Elum, Seattle | |
| Chelan | | 170.05 | 273.67 | | US 2 west – Leavenworth, Stevens Pass, Everett | Southern end of US 2 overlap |
| Chelan | | 184.31 | 296.62 | | SR 285 south – Wenatchee | Interchange |
| Chelan | | 184.57 | 297.04 | | US 97 Alt. north – Entiat, Chelan | Interchange |
| Douglas | | 193.16 | 310.86 | | SR 28 east to I-90 – East Wenatchee, Quincy | |
| Douglas | | 198.16 | 318.91 | | US 2 east – Waterville, Davenport, Spokane | Northern end of US 2 overlap |
| Chelan | | 220.26 | 354.47 | | SR 150 west – Chelan Falls, Chelan, Manson | |
| Chelan | | 225.31 | 362.60 | | US 97 Alt. south – Chelan, Entiat | |
| Okanogan | Pateros | 238.54 | 383.89 | | SR 153 north to SR 20 – Twisp, Winthrop | |
| Okanogan | Brewster | 245.57 | 395.21 | | SR 173 south – Brewster, Bridgeport | |
| Okanogan | | 250.36 | 402.92 | | SR 17 south – Bridgeport, Grand Coulee Dam, Moses Lake | |
| Okanogan | | 271.33 | 436.66 | | SR 20 west / US 97 Bus. north – Okanogan, Twisp, Winthrop | Southern end of SR 20 overlap |
| Okanogan | Omak | 276.39 | 444.81 | | SR 155 south – Omak, Grand Coulee Dam | |
| Okanogan | | 277.47 | 446.54 | | SR 215 south / US 97 Bus. south – Omak | |
| Okanogan | Tonasket | 299.97 | 482.75 | | SR 20 east – Republic | Northern end of SR 20 overlap |
| Okanogan | | 321.62 | 517.60 | | Highway 97 north – Osoyoos | Continuation into British Columbia |
1.000 mi = 1.609 km; 1.000 km = 0.621 mi: Concurrency terminus; Incomplete access

== Special routes ==
=== Alternate route ===
U.S. Route 97 Alternate
- Location: Wenatchee — Chelan
- Length: 39.35 mi (63.33 km)
- Existed: 1987–present

U.S. Route 97 Alternate (US 97 Alt.) is a 39.35-mile (63.33 km) long alternate route that extends from the US 97 / US 2 concurrency north of Wenatchee along the west side of the Columbia River to US 97 east of Chelan, completely in Chelan County. The highway begins at a partial cloverleaf interchange with US 97 / US 2 north of Wenatchee and west of the Richard Odabashian Bridge over the Columbia River. After leaving the interchange, the roadway parallels the eastern boundary of the Wenatchee National Forest to cross the Entiat River and pass Entiat before intersecting SR 971 twice, the second time being on the southern shores of Lake Chelan. The road continues east across the Chelan River into Chelan as various streets, such as Woodin Avenue, Webster Avenue and Saunders Street before intersecting SR 150, leaving Chelan, passing Lake Chelan Airport and ending at US 97. In 1897, US 97 Alternate was a part of a Wenatchee–Twisp highway. That highway became a part of US 97 in 1926 and later US 97 Alternate in 1987 when US 97 was moved east of the river over SR 151. The busiest section of US 97 Alternate in 2007 was north of the US 97 / US 2 interchange, with a daily average of 9,700 motorists.

=== Orondo spur ===
U.S. Route 97 Spur
- Location: Orondo
- Length: 0.26 mi (420 m)

U.S. Route 97 Spur (US 97 Spur) is a 0.26-mile (0.42 km) long spur route that connects US 97 north of the terminus of the US 2 concurrency to US 2 east of the end of the concurrency, completely located in Orondo, a community in Douglas County. The busiest section of US 97 Spur in 2007 was at the US 97 intersection, with a daily average of 250 motorists.

U.S. Route 97
| Previous state: Oregon | Washington | Next state: Terminus |
