= Washington State Route 971 =

State highway in Chelan County, Washington, US

State Route 971

- Map of Chelan County in central Washington with SR 971 highlighted in red

Route information
- Auxiliary route of US 97
- Maintained by WSDOT
- Length: 15.02 mi (24.17 km)
- Existed: 1991–present

Major junctions
- South end: US 97 Alt. near Entiat
- North end: US 97 Alt. near Chelan

Location
- Country: United States
- State: Washington
- Counties: Chelan

Highway system
- State highways in Washington; Interstate; US; State; Scenic; Pre-1964; 1964 renumbering; Former
← SR 970	→ US 2

State Route 971 (SR 971) is a state highway in the U.S. state of Washington. It runs for 15 miles (24 km) and primarily serves Lake Chelan State Park, with both of its termini at U.S. Route 97 Alternate (US 97A) southwest of Chelan. SR 971 has the highest highway number in the state.

The highway traverses Navarre Coulee along the route of a 19th-century road that was later connected to Chelan in the 1910s. Both roads were paved in the 1960s and incorporated into SR 971 when it was established by the state legislature in 1991.

== Route description ==
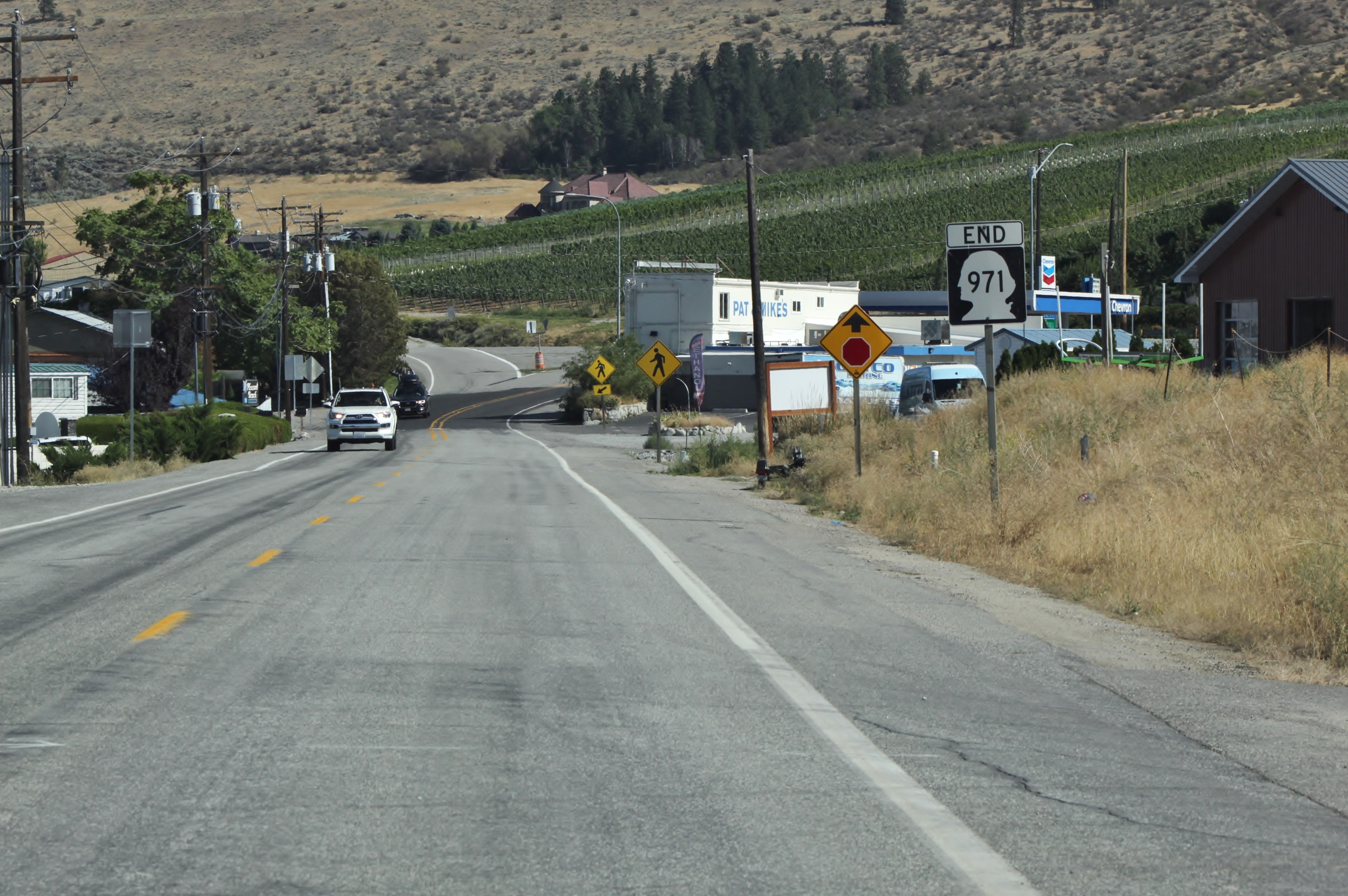
SR 971 approaching its northern terminus at US 97A near Chelan

SR 971 begins at a junction with US 97A on the Columbia River near the former town of Winesap, approximately 9 miles (14 km) north of Entiat. The highway travels northwest along Ficher Canyon and turns north to follow Navarre Coulee, which cuts through an arm of the Chelan Mountains at the eastern end of the Okanogan–Wenatchee National Forest and near the Chelan State Wildlife Area. After passing several small farms, SR 971 climbs the Barrett Grade, which runs northeast and northwest in a narrower and heavily-forested part of the coulee. The highway then turns northeast in its descent towards Lake Chelan and rounds a hairpin turn to the northwest before reaching South Lakeshore Road near Lake Chelan State Park.

Adjacent to the state park entrance, SR 971 turns east onto South Lakeshore Road, which continues along Lake Chelan towards Twenty-Five Mile Creek State Park. The highway travels east along the shore of Lake Chelan, passing small marinas as well as homes on the lakefront and on the steep cliffs to the south. Near Bear Mountain, SR 971 passes several vineyards and terminates at a junction with US 97A west of the town of Chelan.

SR 971 is the highest-numbered state highway in Washington. The highway is maintained by the Washington State Department of Transportation (WSDOT), who conduct an annual survey of traffic volume that is expressed in terms of annual average daily traffic (AADT), a measure of traffic volume for any average day of the year. Average daily traffic volumes on SR 971 in 2016 ranged from a minimum of 680 vehicles near the Barrett Grade to a maximum of 2,600 vehicles near its northern terminus.

== History ==
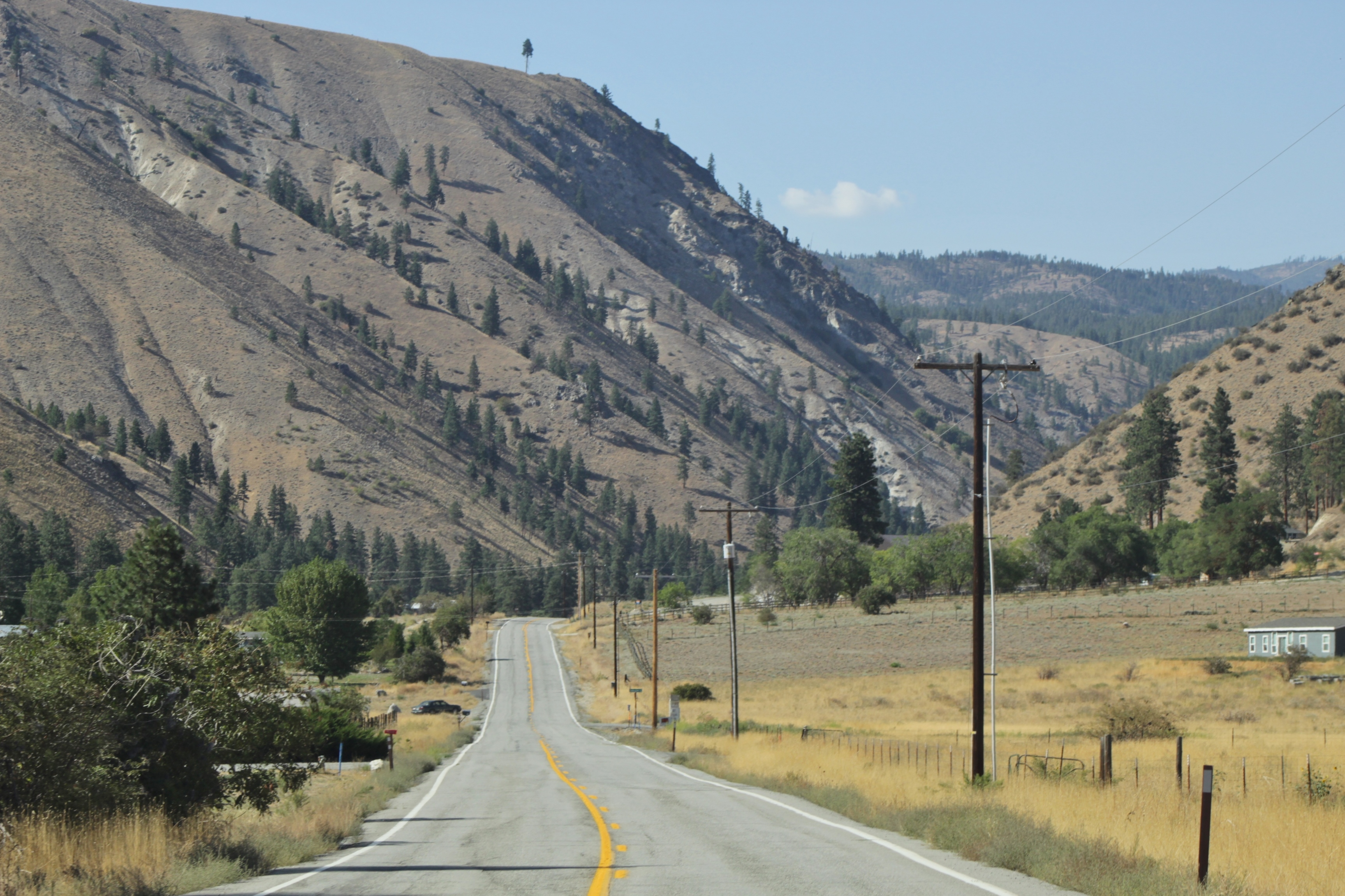
SR 971 in the Navarre Coulee, looking north towards the Chelan Mountains

An unpaved road along Navarre Coulee from the Columbia River to the summit overlooking Lake Chelan was built in the late 19th century. The Chelan County government began surveying a new road along the south shore of Lake Chelan in 1910 with the intent of connecting it to a new route over Navarre Coulee. The two roads would serve as an alternative to the existing Wenatchee–Chelan road via the steeper Knapp Coulee.

The gravel road along Navarre Coulee and the lakeshore was rebuilt by the county government in 1947, with sections straightened and widened before being oiled. The road was paved over several stages in the 1960s, in part with funds from the state government. The state legislature established SR 971 on the corridor in 1991, allowing for WSDOT to take over maintenance of the road the following year. The state government funded a major resurfacing project in 1996 and the replacement of a fish culvert on First Creek in 1999.

== Major intersections ==
The entire highway is in Chelan County.

Location	mi	km	Destinations	Notes
	0.00	0.00	US 97 Alt. – Chelan, Entiat, Wenatchee	
	9.07	14.60	South Lakeshore Road – Fields Point, Twenty-Five Mile Creek State Park	
	15.02	24.17	US 97 Alt. – Chelan, Entiat, Wenatchee	
1.000 mi = 1.609 km; 1.000 km = 0.621 mi
