= Washington State Route 150 =

State highway in Chelan County, Washington, US

State Route 150

- SR 150 highlighted in red

Route information
- Auxiliary route of US 97
- Maintained by WSDOT
- Length: 11.76 mi (18.93 km)
- Existed: 1964–present

Major junctions
- West end: Wapato Point Parkway in Manson
- US 97 Alt. in Chelan
- East end: US 97 near Chelan Falls

Location
- Country: United States
- State: Washington
- Counties: Chelan

Highway system
- State highways in Washington; Interstate; US; State; Scenic; Pre-1964; 1964 renumbering; Former
← SR 142	→ SR 153

State Route 150 (SR 150) is a 11.76-mile (18.93 km) long state highway serving Chelan County in the U.S. state of Washington. The highway begins in the unincorporated community of Manson and travels southeast along the north shore of Lake Chelan into Chelan, where it is briefly concurrent with U.S. Route 97 Alternate (US 97 Alternate). It ends at US 97 north of the Beebe Bridge on the Columbia River north of Chelan Falls. The road, which has existed since the 1890s, was signed as Secondary State Highway 10C (SSH 10C) and part of SSH 10D in 1937. SSH 10C became SR 151 and SSH 10D became SR 150 in the 1964 highway renumbering, the latter being renumbered in 1987 as part of US 97.

== Route description ==
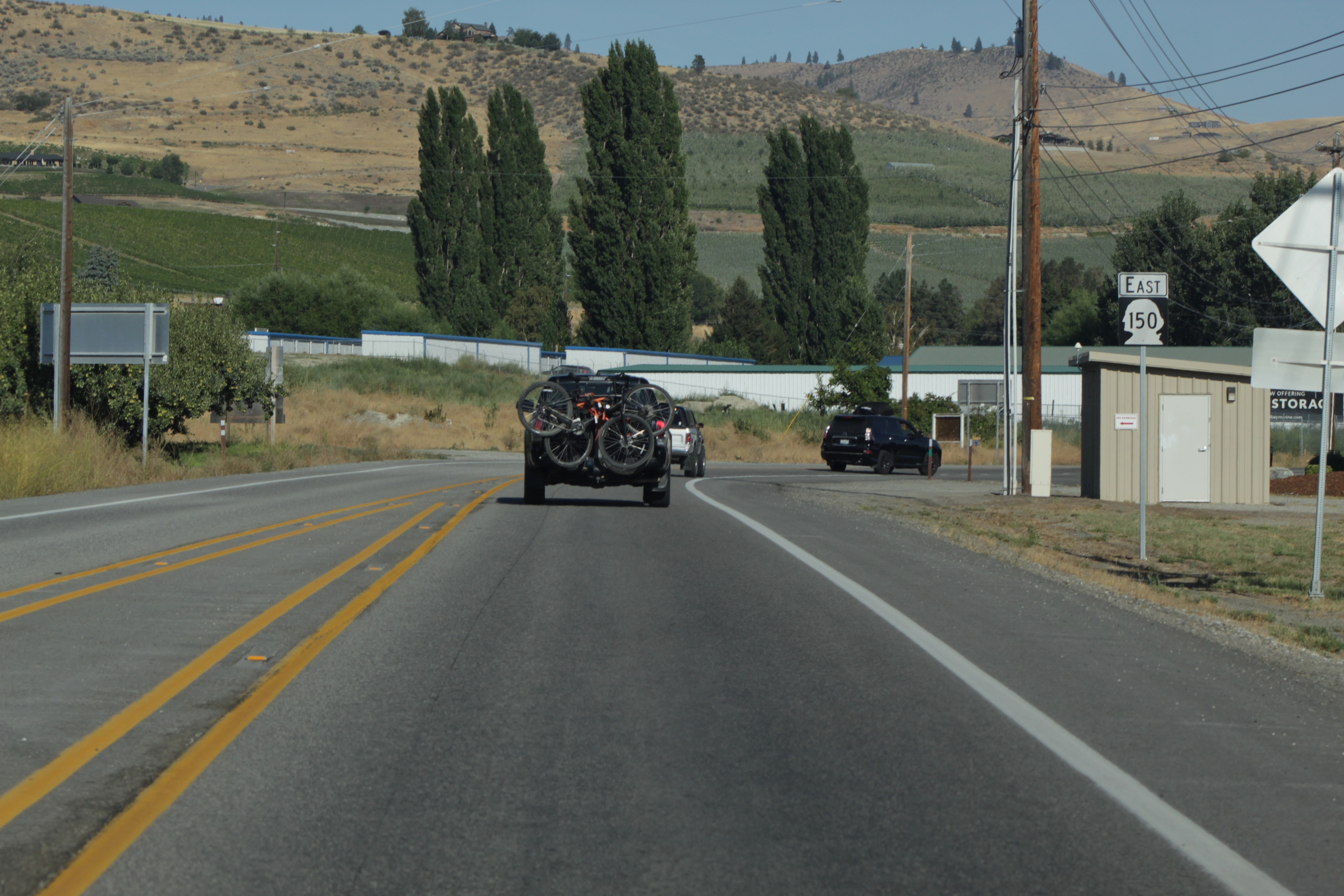
SR 150 in Manson

SR 150 begins at the intersection of Wapato Point Parkway and Wapato Way in the unincorporated community of Manson on the north shore of Lake Chelan. The highway travels southeast parallel to the shore of Lake Chelan into Chelan and turns south to serve Lakeshore Park. Within Chelan, SR 150 is routed east onto Johnson Avenue before turning south onto Saunders Street and intersecting US 97 Alternate and beginning a short concurrency as Woodin Avenue. US 97 Alternate splits off, traveling northeast, and SR 150 continues southeast towards Chelan Falls and crosses over the Cascade and Columbia River Railroad. The highway ends at an intersection with US 97 north of the Beebe Bridge on the Columbia River.

Every year the Washington State Department of Transportation (WSDOT) conducts a series of surveys on its highways in the state to measure traffic volume. This is expressed in terms of annual average daily traffic (AADT), which is a measure of traffic volume for any average day of the year. In 2011, WSDOT calculated that between 2,300 and 10,000 vehicles per day used the highway, mostly in Downtown Chelan on Woodin Avenue.

== History ==
An unpaved road connecting the Manson area to Chelan was built in the 1890s after the establishment of Chelan in 1886, with an extension of the road to Chelan Falls was built in 1919 to connect to the newly dedicated Beebe Bridge. During the formation of the Primary and secondary state highway system in 1937, the route from Manson to Chelan became SSH 10C, ending at US 97, and the route from Chelan to Chelan Falls became a segment of SSH 10D, beginning at US 2 in Orondo and traveling north to US 97. During the 1964 highway renumbering, SSH 10C became SR 150 and SSH 10D became SR 151. US 97 was re-routed onto the former route of SR 151 towards Chelan Falls in 1987, proposed in the 1950s, and SR 150 was extended to the new bypass of Chelan. U.S 97 Alternate was created on the former route of US 97, becoming concurrent with SR 150 in Downtown Chelan. WSDOT replaced an intersection with No See-Um Road northwest of Chelan with a roundabout in 2017.

== Major intersections ==
The entire highway is in Chelan County.

Location	mi	km	Destinations	Notes
Manson	0.00	0.00	Wapato Point Parkway	Western terminus; continues as Wapato Way
Chelan	7.95	12.79	US 97 Alt. south (Saunders Street) – Wenatchee	West end of US 97A overlap
Chelan	8.78	14.13	US 97 Alt. north to US 97 – Pateros, Okanogan, Penticton	East end of US 97A overlap
	11.76	18.93	US 97 – Okanogan, Wenatchee	Eastern terminus
1.000 mi = 1.609 km; 1.000 km = 0.621 mi: Concurrency terminus
