= Beebe Bridge =

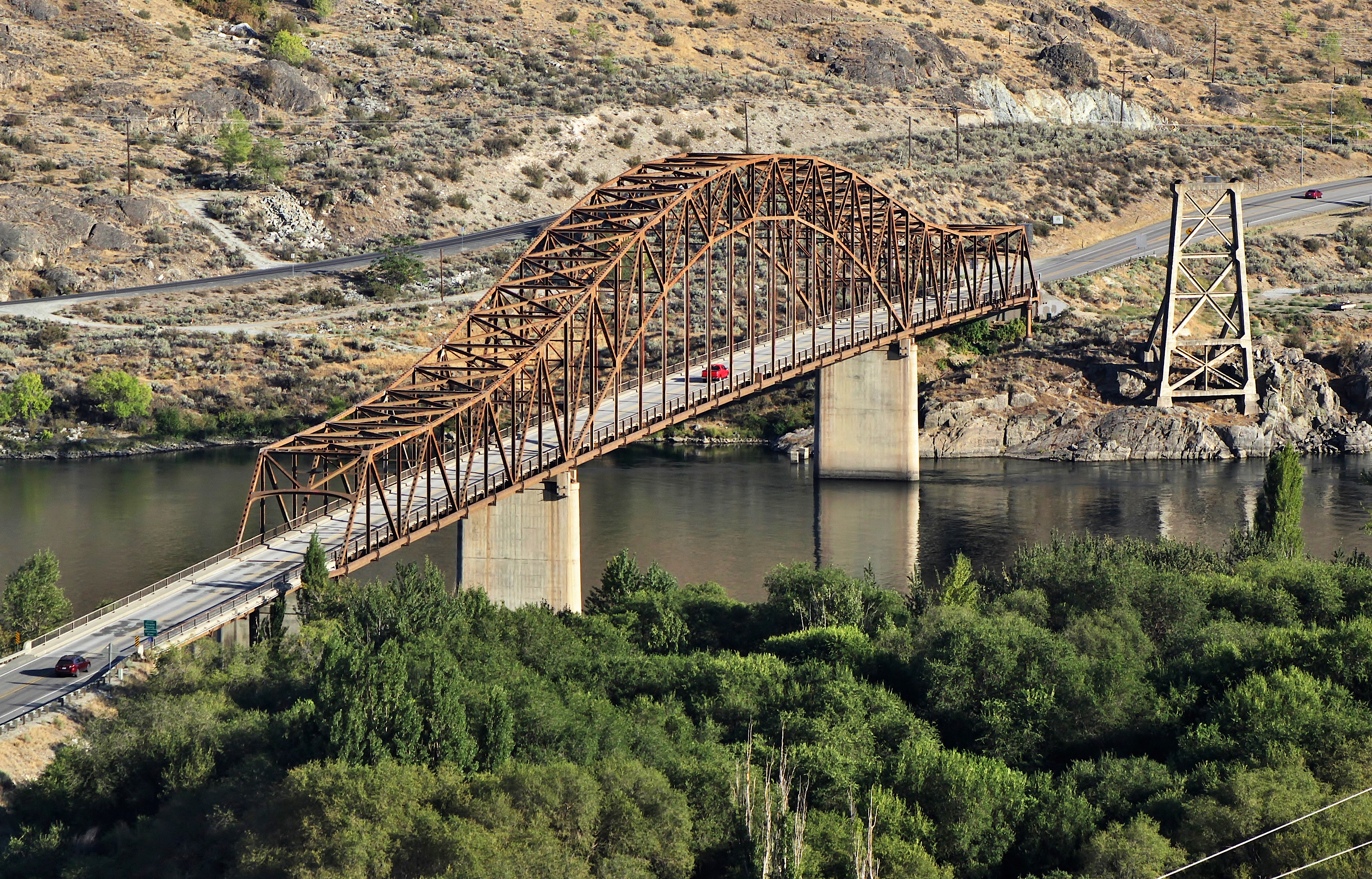
- The bridge with the old tower to the right
- Coordinates: 47.81381°N 119.97261°W
- Carries: US 97
- Crosses: Columbia River
- Locale: Chelan, Washington
- Maintained by: Washington State DOT

Characteristics
- Design: Continuous-Steel Through-Truss
- Total length: 1,227 ft (374.0 m)

History
- Construction end: 1963

Statistics
- Daily traffic: 5,000 (2009)

Location
- Interactive map of Beebe Bridge

The Beebe Bridge (/ˈbiːbi/ BEE-bee) is a two-lane, steel through arch bridge crossing the Columbia River at Chelan Falls, Washington. Located three miles east of Lake Chelan, the bridge is part of U.S. Route 97 and averages 5000 vehicle crossings per day.

The Beebe Bridge is 1,040 feet (320 m) long with a deck width of 26 feet (7.9 m), supporting one lane of traffic in each direction and 3-foot (0.91 m) sidewalks on either side. It is one of three "Continuous-steel through-truss tied-arch" bridges in the state. The Blue Bridge over the Columbia in the Tri-Cities, and the Elmer Huntley Bridge over the Snake are of the same design. Seismically retrofitted in 2000, the Beebe Bridge was considered to be in very good condition following its last structural safety inspection in 2007. In 1959, WSDOT began construction of the current bridge, which was opened in June 1963 at a cost of $1,120,000.

== History ==
The bridge is named after The Beebe Orchard Company which built the first bridge in 1919. It was a reinforced concrete tower suspension bridge over the Columbia River at Chelan Falls to carry irrigation water in two 12-inch water flumes from springs on the west side to their orchards on the east side of the river. The Beebe Bridge was the first suspension bridge in Washington State. It was completed at a cost of $75,000, and at the time, it was the largest privately built and owned bridge in the world.

By 1947, the Beebe Orchard Company was the state's largest apple growing enterprise operated by a single family.

Although not originally intended for public vehicle crossing, the historic bridge's 12-foot-wide (3.7 m) wooden-deck roadway aided in fruit transport and helped the company recoup the cost of extending the water pipeline by instituting crossing tolls. Although the water flumes were removed in 1926, the private toll bridge remained in use until it was replaced by the current state bridge in 1963.

The state began construction of the present bridge in 1959 and had completed the piers before the reservoir behind Rocky Reach Dam, also known as Lake Entiat, inundated the site. During continued construction, legal maneuvering by the orchard company brought the project to a halt for over a year. The Beebe Orchard Company finally agreed to accept a one-time payment of $4,000 for its property and interests. The old suspension bridge was dismantled, but its concrete towers were left in place and can still be seen just downstream of the new span.

== August 2009 closure ==
On August 31, 2009, a semi-truck collision severely damaged the Beebe Bridge's steel trusses and beams, forcing its closure. Traffic was detoured to U.S. Route 97A. The bridge was repaired and reopened on October 9, 2009, at a cost of $1.5 million.

== Images ==
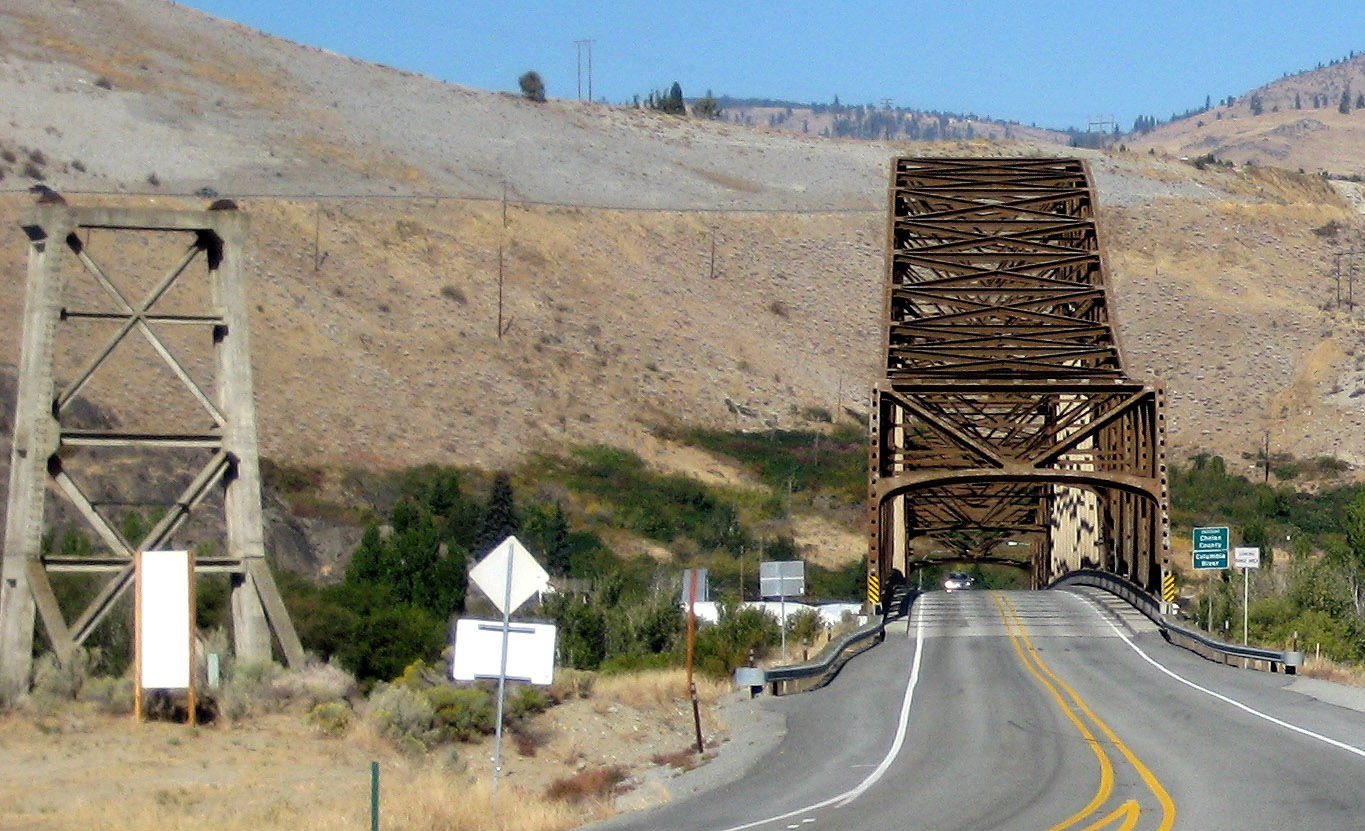
Historic towers to the south

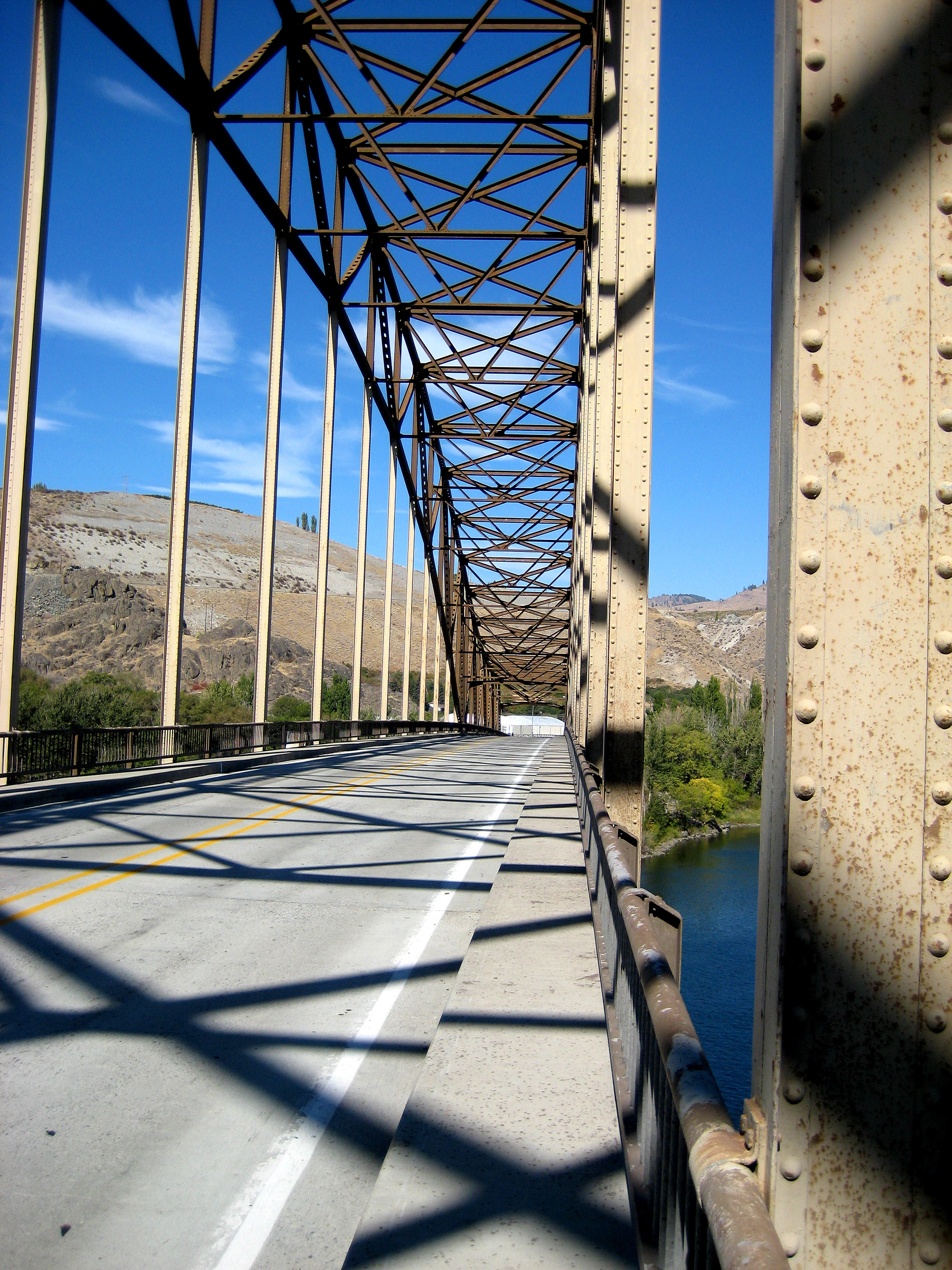
Looking west, this photo was taken while standing on the deck of the Beebe Bridge over the Columbia River in late September, 2007

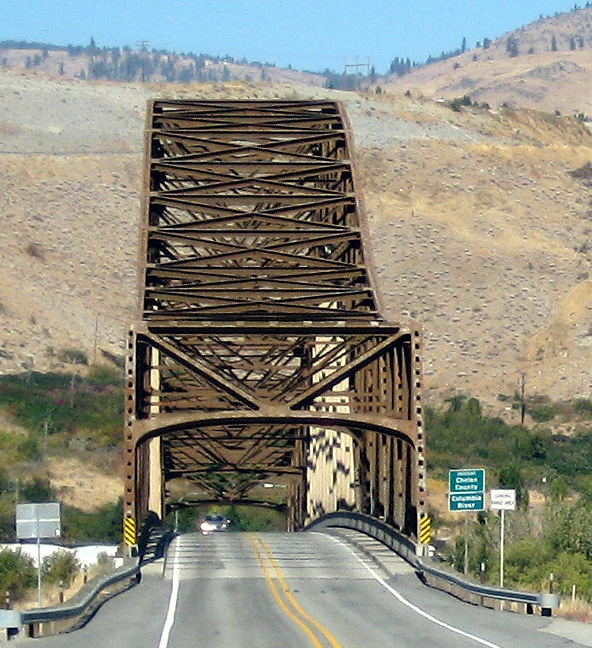
The roadway crossing the bridge

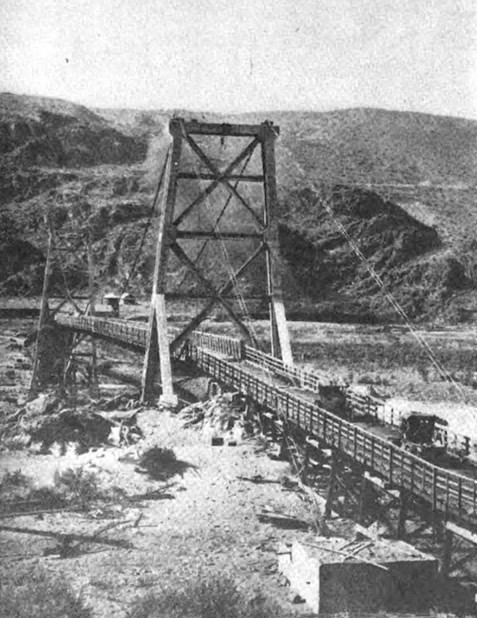
Original suspension bridge

== See also ==
- List of crossings of the Columbia River
