= Lake Chelan State Park =

State park in Washington (state), U.S.

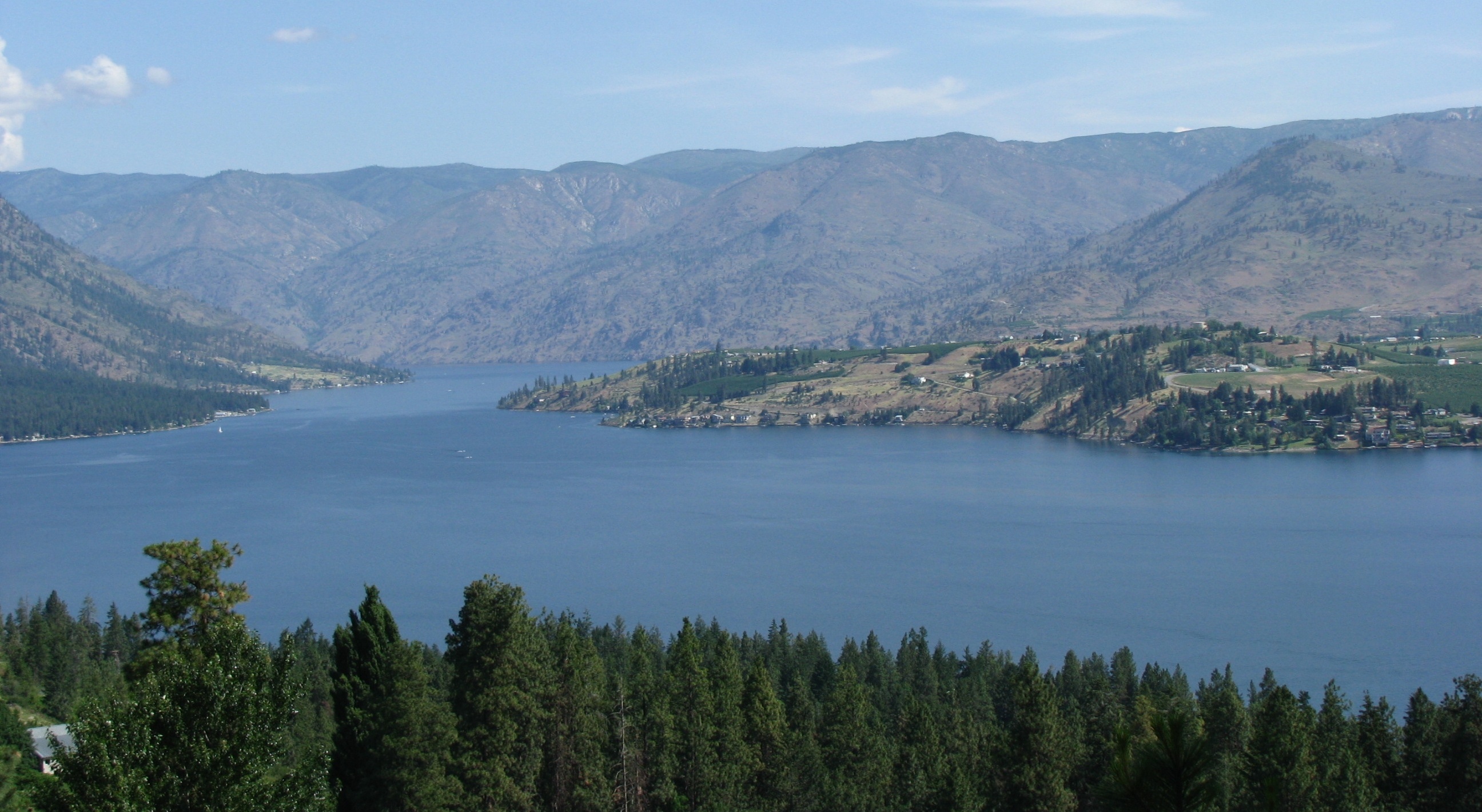
- Lake Chelan from the approach to the state park along Navarre Coulee Road

- Location within Washington (state) Location within the United States
- Location: Chelan County, Washington, United States
- Coordinates: 47°52′32″N 120°11′47″W
- Area: 139 acres (56 ha)
- Elevation: 1,102 ft (336 m)
- Established: 1942
- Administrator: Washington State Parks and Recreation Commission
- Website: Official website

Lake Chelan State Park is a public recreation area covering 139 acres (56 ha) on the southwest shore of Lake Chelan in Chelan County, Washington, on the east side of the Cascade Mountains. The state park was created with the state's initial purchase of land in 1942; it opened in 1943. The park offers camping, picnicking, hiking, boating, and water activities.
