= Twenty-Five Mile Creek State Park =

State park in Washington, United States

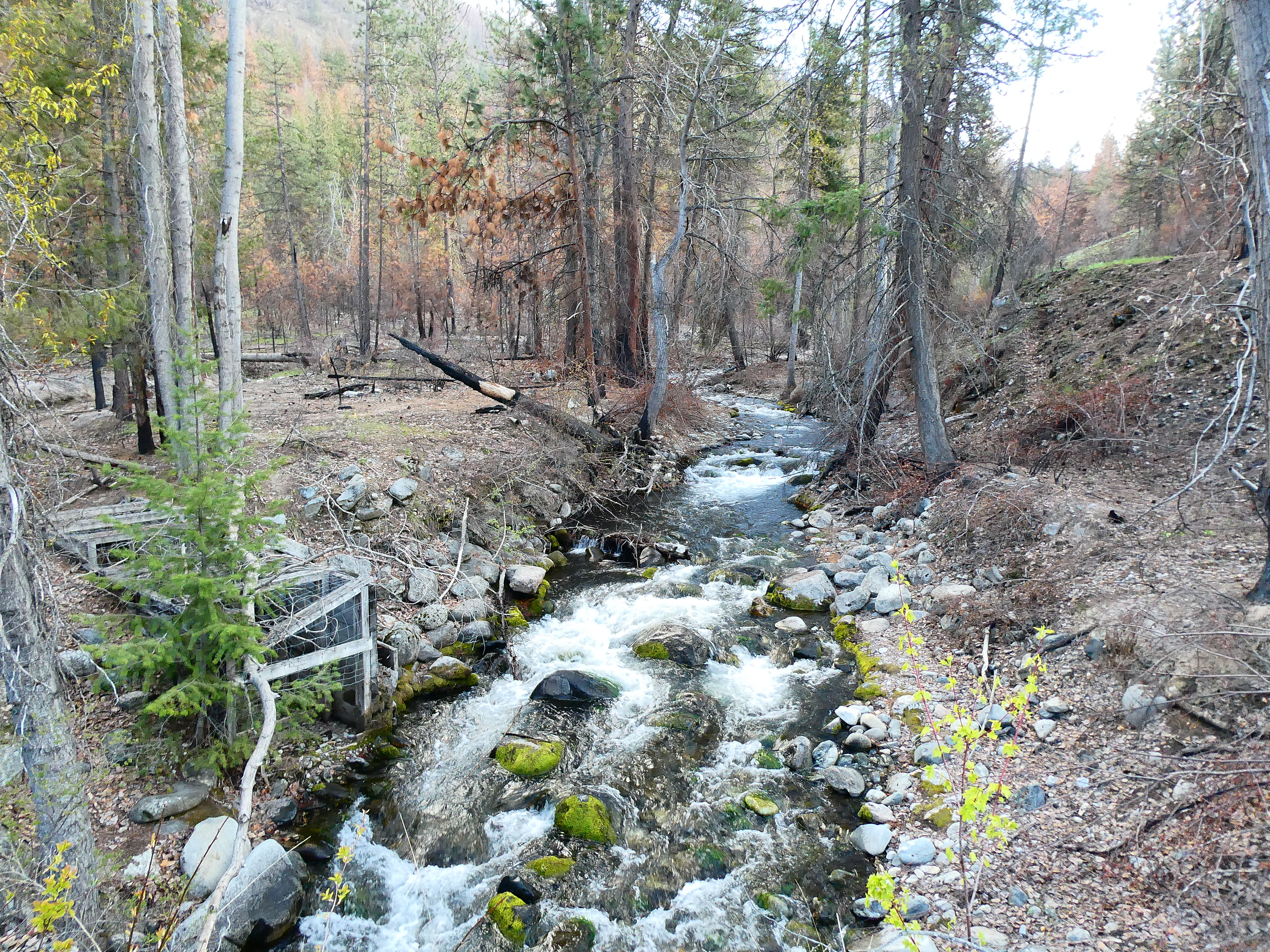
- Twenty-Five Mile Creek with 2021 wildfire damage visible

- Location within Washington (state) Location within the United States
- Location: Chelan County, Washington, United States
- Coordinates: 47°59′35″N 120°15′43″W
- Area: 232 acres (94 ha)
- Elevation: 1,102 ft (336 m)
- Established: 1972
- Administrator: Washington State Parks and Recreation Commission
- Website: Official website

Twenty-Five Mile Creek State Park is a public recreation area on the western side of Lake Chelan, 15 miles (24 km) northwest of the city of Chelan in Chelan County, Washington. The 232-acre (94 ha) state park was a private resort that came into state ownership in 1972. It was operated under lease to various concessionaires until the state took over staffing in 1988. The park offers camping, a marina, fishing, waterskiing, bird watching, and mountain biking.
