= Lake Chelan Airport =

Airport in Washington, United States

- IATA: none; ICAO: none; FAA LID: S10

Summary
- Airport type: Public
- Owner: City of Chelan/Port of Chelan
- Serves: Chelan, Washington
- Elevation AMSL: 1,263 ft (385 m)
- Coordinates: 47°51′58″N 119°56′34″W
- Interactive map of Lake Chelan Airport

Runways
Direction	Length		Surface
Direction	ft	m	Surface
2/20	3,503	1,068	Asphalt

Statistics (2009)
- Aircraft operations: 16,000
- Based aircraft: 64
- Source: Federal Aviation Administration

Lake Chelan Airport (FAA LID: S10), formerly known as Chelan Municipal Airport, is a public use airport located three nautical miles (6 km) northeast of the central business district of Chelan, a city in Chelan County, Washington, United States. The airport is owned by the City of Chelan/Port of Chelan. According to the FAA's National Plan of Integrated Airport Systems for 2009–2013, it is categorized as a general aviation facility.

== Facilities and aircraft ==
=== Facilities ===
Lake Chelan Airport covers an area of 78 acres (32 ha) at an elevation of 1,263 feet (385 m) above mean sea level. It has one runway designated 2/20 with an asphalt surface measuring 3,503 by 60 feet (1,068 x 18 m).

==== Runway Relocation ====
In February 2026, the airport released an environmental analysis and community impact report on a proposed plan to extend, rotate, and slightly relocate its main runway. Factors considered include possible land acquisition; runway and taxiway relocations in accordance with FAA standards; a plan to relocate a nearby road; taxilane and hangar adjustments; irrigation system modifications; and a plan to install an automatic weather observation station.

Later that year, the FAA rejected the proposal, saying that the runway configuration the airport desires would not be operationally feasible. Flight simulations were used to determine how the newly-proposed runway would be used, and problems were identified with surrounding mountains.

The airport authority accepted funds to update a master plan and layout proposal for the airport. The FAA proposed that local officials revisit the airport's projected needs and conduct additional outreach to airport users and local residents.

=== Aircraft ===
For the 12-month period ending June 30, 2009, the airport had 16,000 general aviation aircraft operations, an average of 43 per day. At that time there were 64 aircraft based at this airport: 78.1% single-engine, 4.7% multi-engine, 1.6% helicopter and 15.6% ultralight.

== See also ==
- List of airports in Washington
