= Azwell, Washington =

Azwell
- Unincorporated community
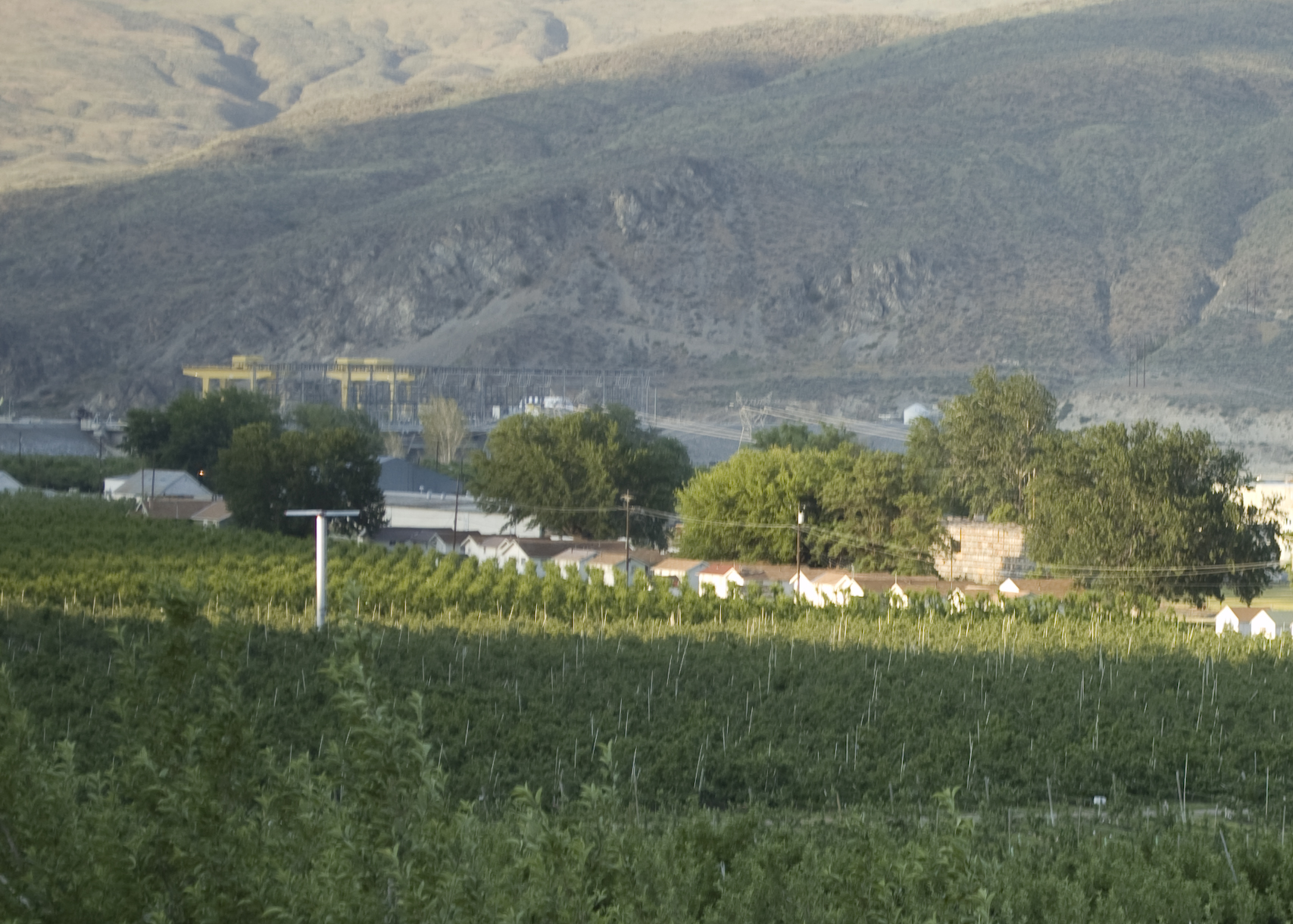
- Azwell, Washington with Wells Dam in the background

- Location within Washington (state)
- Coordinates: 47°56′15″N 119°52′35″W
- Country: United States
- State: Washington
- County: Okanogan
- Named for: Alfred Z. Wells
- Elevation: 781 ft (238 m)
- Time zone: UTC-8 (Pacific (PST))
  - Summer (DST): UTC-7 (PDT)
- GNIS feature ID: 1516006

Azwell is a small unincorporated community in Okanogan County, Washington, United States.

== History ==
Azwell is named for its founder, Alfred Z. Wells. Wells and his nephew Alfred Morris were owners of a hardware store in Wenatchee, and entered the orchard business in the area that would become Azwell. Their partnership was discontinued in 1941, Alfred Wells kept the orchard and Azwell became a company community with several year round residents.

As of 1953, the town comprised about 300 acres of apple and peach orchards, a fruit packing warehouse, and a grocery store with a population of about 20 families living in Azwell year-round.

== Geography ==
The community is located on the Columbia River, below Wells Dam. Azwell is 6 miles south of Pateros, Washington and 60 miles north of Wenatchee, Washington.
