= Winesap, Washington =

Ghost town in Washington (state)

- Ghost town
- Location within Washington (state) Location within the United States
- Coordinates: 47°45′34″N 120°12′00″W
- Country: United States
- State: Washington
- County: Chelan
- Established: 1909
- Time zone: UTC-8 (Pacific (PST))
  - Summer (DST): UTC-7 (PDT)

Winesap is a ghost town in Chelan County, in the U.S. state of Washington. The GNIS classifies it as a populated place.

A post office called Winesap was established in 1909, and remained in operation until 1944. An early variant name was Coles View.
