= Manson, Washington =

- Census-designated place
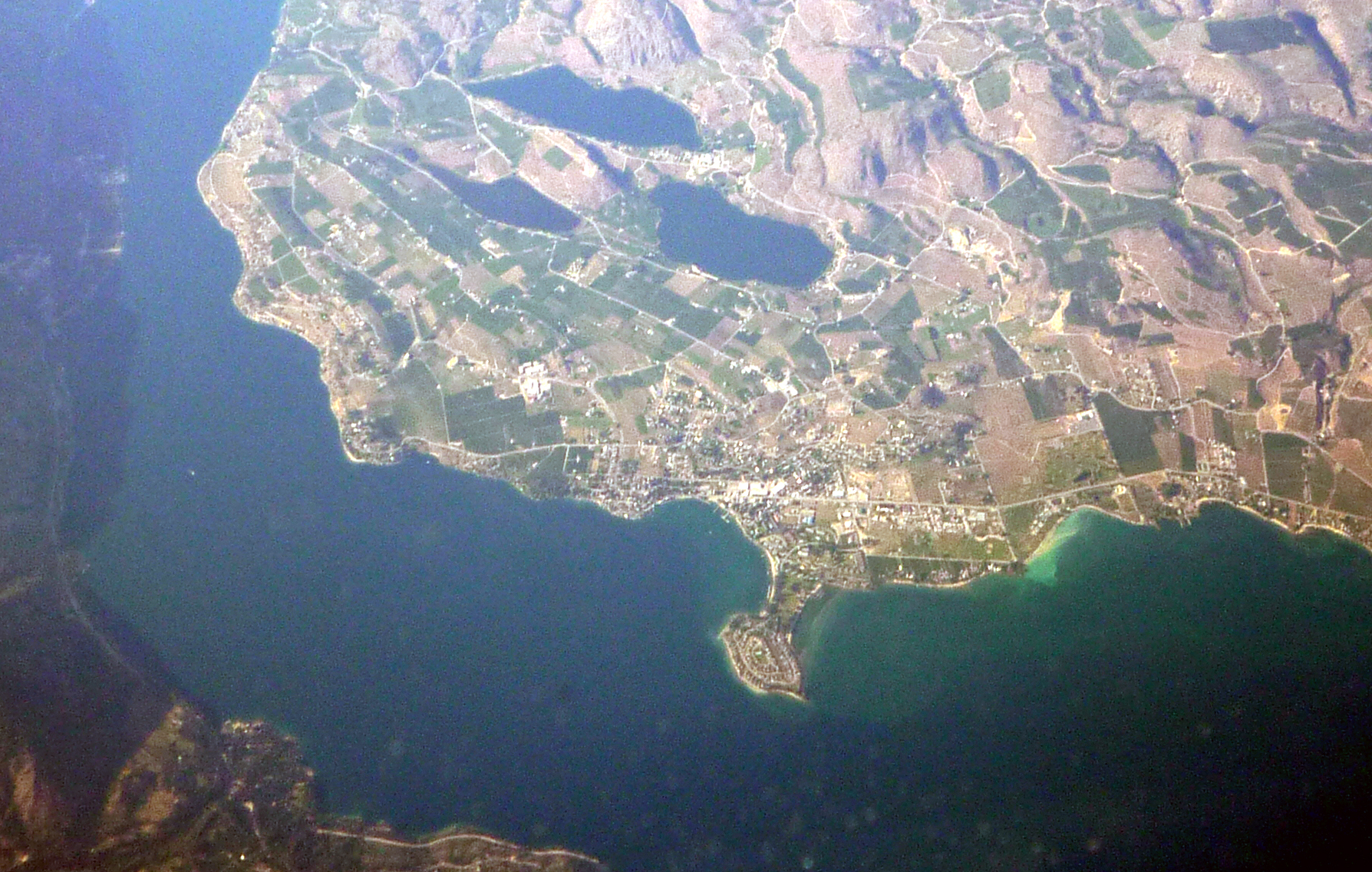
- Aerial view of Manson

- Location within Washington (state)
- Coordinates: 47°52′32″N 120°09′42″W
- Country: United States
- State: Washington
- County: Chelan

Area
  - Total: 1.25 sq mi (3.25 km^{2})
  - Land: 1.25 sq mi (3.25 km^{2})
  - Water: 0 sq mi (0.0 km^{2})
- Elevation: 1,102 ft (336 m)

Population (2020)
  - Total: 1,523
  - Density: 1,171/sq mi (452.3/km^{2})
- Time zone: UTC-8 (Pacific (PST))
  - Summer (DST): UTC-7 (PDT)
- ZIP code: 98831
- Area code: 509
- GNIS feature ID: 2586739
- FIPS code: 53-42835

Manson is an unincorporated community and census-designated place in Chelan County in the U.S. state of Washington. It was named in 1912 for Manson F. Backus, president of the Lake Chelan Land Company. Manson is located in the north-central portion of the state on the north shore of Lake Chelan, approximately 7 miles (11 km) northwest of the city of Chelan.

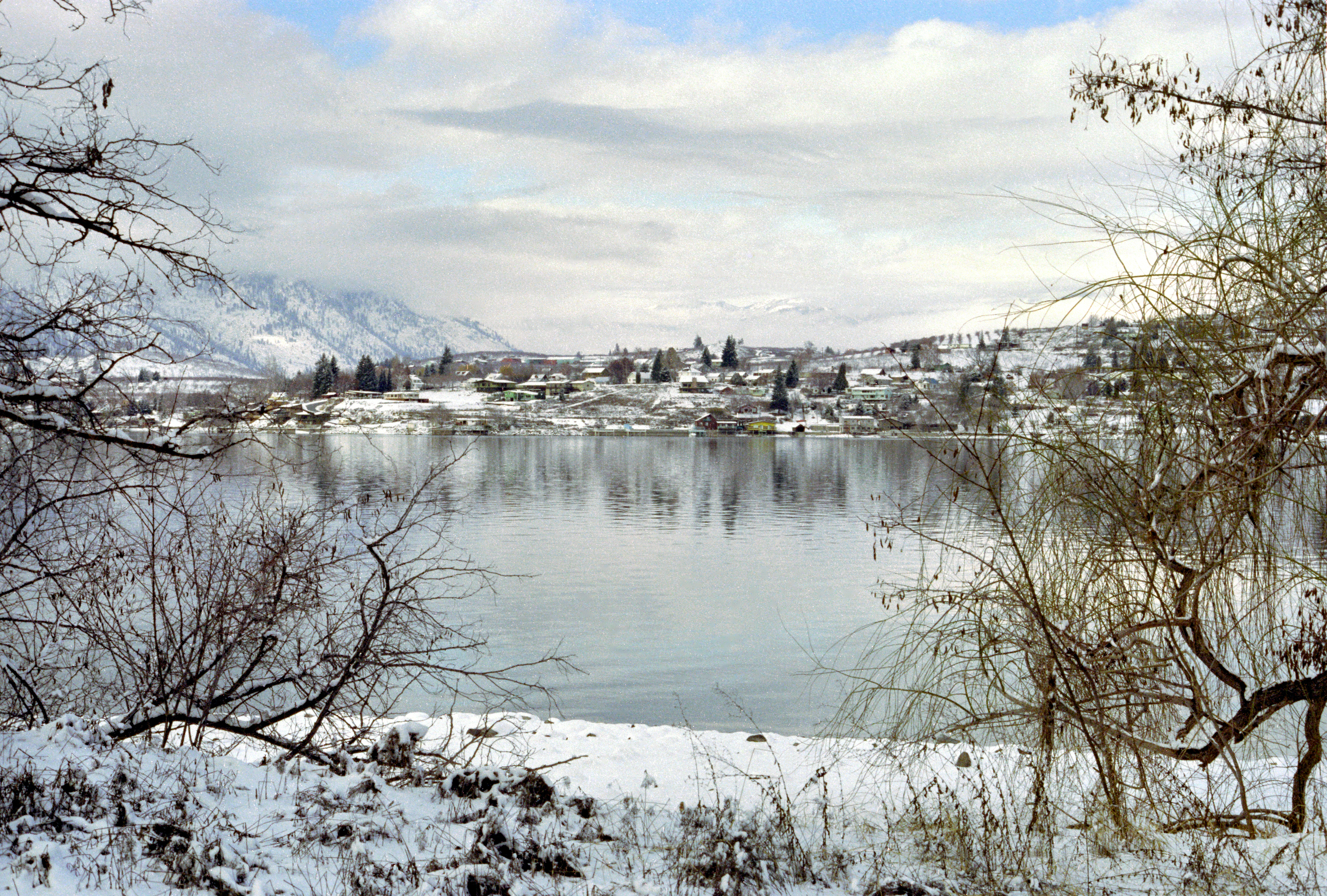
View of Manson from Wapato Point

Manson is part of the Wenatchee–East Wenatchee Metropolitan Statistical Area.

The USPS ZIP code for Manson is 98831.

Manson is home to a number of wineries.

== Demographics ==
Historical population
Census	Pop.	Note	%±
2010	1,468		—
2020	1,523		3.7%
U.S. Decennial Census; 2000 2010

Manson first appeared as a census designated place in the 2010 U.S. census.

=== Racial and ethnic composition ===
Manson CDP, Washington – Racial and ethnic composition Note: the US Census treats Hispanic/Latino as an ethnic category. This table excludes Latinos from the racial categories and assigns them to a separate category. Hispanics/Latinos may be of any race.
Race / Ethnicity (NH = Non-Hispanic)	Pop 2010	Pop 2020	% 2010	% 2020
White alone (NH)	917	1,015	62.47%	66.64%
Black or African American alone (NH)	2	3	0.14%	0.20%
Native American or Alaska Native alone (NH)	11	6	0.75%	0.39%
Asian alone (NH)	12	5	0.82%	0.33%
Native Hawaiian or Pacific Islander alone (NH)	0	0	0.00%	0.00%
Other race alone (NH)	4	11	0.27%	0.72%
Mixed race or Multiracial (NH)	8	41	0.54%	2.69%
Hispanic or Latino (any race)	514	442	35.01%	29.02%
Total	1,468	1,523	100.00%	100.00%

=== 2020 census ===
As of the 2020 census, Manson had a population of 1,523. The median age was 51.5 years. 19.5% of residents were under the age of 18 and 30.1% of residents were 65 years of age or older. For every 100 females there were 98.6 males, and for every 100 females age 18 and over there were 107.8 males age 18 and over.

99.2% of residents lived in urban areas, while 0.8% lived in rural areas.

There were 651 households in Manson, of which 26.7% had children under the age of 18 living in them. Of all households, 53.8% were married-couple households, 22.7% were households with a male householder and no spouse or partner present, and 18.6% were households with a female householder and no spouse or partner present. About 26.6% of all households were made up of individuals and 14.1% had someone living alone who was 65 years of age or older.

There were 1,000 housing units, of which 34.9% were vacant. The homeowner vacancy rate was 0.0% and the rental vacancy rate was 19.5%.

Racial composition as of the 2020 census
Race	Number	Percent
White	1,062	69.7%
Black or African American	3	0.2%
American Indian and Alaska Native	8	0.5%
Asian	6	0.4%
Native Hawaiian and Other Pacific Islander	0	0.0%
Some other race	314	20.6%
Two or more races	130	8.5%
Hispanic or Latino (of any race)	442	29.0%

=== 2010 census ===
As of the 2010 census, the population was 1,468. 2010 was the first year that Manson was tracked by the census bureau.
