= Chelan, Washington =

- City
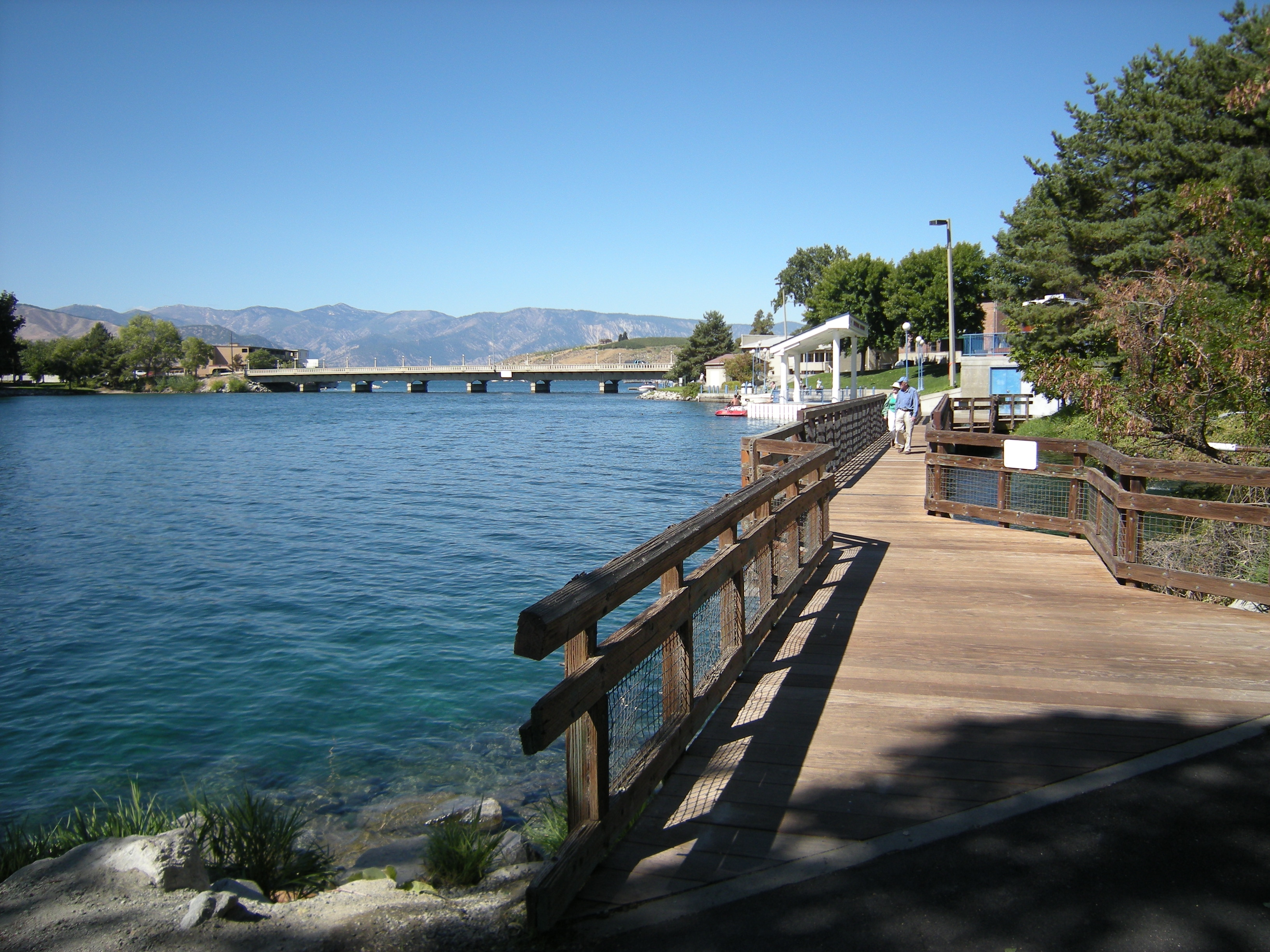
- Chelan Riverwalk

- Location of Chelan, Washington
- Coordinates: 47°50′04″N 120°01′17″W
- Country: United States
- State: Washington
- County: Chelan

Government
  - Mayor: Erin McCardle

Area
  - Total: 6.86 sq mi (17.78 km^{2})
  - Land: 6.69 sq mi (17.32 km^{2})
  - Water: 0.17 sq mi (0.45 km^{2})
- Elevation: 1,772 ft (540 m)

Population (2020)
  - Total: 4,222
  - Density: 633.4/sq mi (244.57/km^{2})
- Time zone: UTC−8 (Pacific (PST))
  - Summer (DST): UTC−7 (PDT)
- ZIP code: 98816
- Area code: 509
- FIPS code: 53-11615
- GNIS feature ID: 2409440
- Website: cityofchelan.gov

Chelan (/ʃəˈlæn/ shə-LAN) is a city in Chelan County, Washington, United States. The estimated population was 4,222 at the 2020 census. It lies on the southeast tip of Lake Chelan, where the lake flows into the Chelan River.

Chelan is part of the Wenatchee−East Wenatchee Metropolitan Statistical Area.

== History ==
The original inhabitants of the Chelan area were the Chelan, a tribe of Salish-speaking Native Americans. Relatively little is known about the culture and lifestyle of the early Chelan, as the tribe had adopted the dress, beadwork, and equestrian culture of the Plains Native Americans by the time of European contact. Infectious diseases including smallpox and measles arrived sometime prior to white settlement of the area, and had killed an estimated 90% of the Natives by the time explorer David Thompson arrived on the Columbia in 1811.

Until this point tribal decision-making had been carried out by small family groups as opposed to a single chief. But as whites began to settle in the area, the Native Americans recognized that consolidation of power in a single representative would help them maintain control of their ancestral lands. Though not a Chelan Native American himself, Chief Moses (a Shahaptin, not Salish speaker from the Columbia Basin and Okanagan) agreed to represent the tribe and was nearly successful in securing them a large Indian reservation. However, the tribe's relatively low population meant that they were largely unable to defend their territory from the ever-increasing number of miners looking for riches in the mountains. As the unrest continued into the 1870s, Lt. Colonel Henry Clay Merriam of the United States Army established Camp Chelan at the foot of Lake Chelan to control and safeguard the Native American population on the Moses Columbia Reservation. The lake was largely inaccessible because of its sheer cliffs on most sides, so a makeshift road was built from the fort to the Columbia River where a courier and mail service from Walla Walla were established and the small village of Chelan Falls would later develop. The fort operated for about a year and was abandoned in October 1880 when the troops relocated to Fort Spokane.

The first European settlers in the area were William Sanders (after whom one of main streets in Chelan is named) and Henry Dumpke, who arrived in 1886. After traversing several cliffs and streams and losing their horse, they safely arrived at the foot of the lake and were welcomed by the natives who encouraged them to stake claims. The presence of these settlers paved the way for more settlers to move to the valley. In 1888, Minneapolis realtor and lumber broker L.H. Woodin, after whom another street is now named, arrived in the valley and paddled up the lake in a skiff. Impressed by the area, Woodin constructed a sawmill at the foot of the lake. At the same time, local ranchers were beginning to discover that orchards could be planted without the need of irrigation.

The town was platted and lots sold quickly. A post office was established in 1890. A school was built in 1892, followed by a resort hotel which took advantage of the area's natural beauty. Following the Panic of 1893, Chelan fell on hard times but fared better than some other towns. The town's first bank was established in 1893. Chelan was officially incorporated on May 7, 1902. In 1903, the city gained electric lights and water service via nearby Donaldson Springs. Chelan's first town hall was constructed in 1904 and destroyed by fire in 1927. The town continues to grow as an agricultural center and resort community which helps it thrive to this day.

== Geography ==
According to the United States Census Bureau, the city has a total area of 6.35 square miles (16.45 km^{2}), of which, 6.29 square miles (16.29 km^{2}) is land and 0.06 square miles (0.16 km^{2}) is water.

=== Climate ===
Chelan's climate is typical for Eastern Washington. Located behind the rain shadow of the Cascade Mountains, it receives a near-desert amount of precipitation each year.

Climate data for Chelan, Washington (1991–2020 normals, extremes 1891–present)
Month	Jan	Feb	Mar	Apr	May	Jun	Jul	Aug	Sep	Oct	Nov	Dec	Year
Record high °F (°C)	62 (17)	63 (17)	74 (23)	88 (31)	98 (37)	111 (44)	109 (43)	106 (41)	97 (36)	88 (31)	72 (22)	65 (18)	111 (44)
Mean maximum °F (°C)	47.8 (8.8)	52.1 (11.2)	63.4 (17.4)	74.9 (23.8)	86.4 (30.2)	90.3 (32.4)	98.5 (36.9)	98.6 (37.0)	89.2 (31.8)	75.0 (23.9)	57.9 (14.4)	48.3 (9.1)	100.1 (37.8)
Mean daily maximum °F (°C)	34.3 (1.3)	41.7 (5.4)	51.9 (11.1)	62.1 (16.7)	71.9 (22.2)	77.9 (25.5)	86.6 (30.3)	87.0 (30.6)	77.2 (25.1)	62.2 (16.8)	45.7 (7.6)	34.9 (1.6)	61.1 (16.2)
Daily mean °F (°C)	28.0 (−2.2)	33.0 (0.6)	41.1 (5.1)	49.8 (9.9)	59.0 (15.0)	65.4 (18.6)	72.8 (22.7)	72.5 (22.5)	63.2 (17.3)	50.5 (10.3)	37.6 (3.1)	28.7 (−1.8)	50.1 (10.1)
Mean daily minimum °F (°C)	21.6 (−5.8)	24.3 (−4.3)	30.3 (−0.9)	37.5 (3.1)	46.2 (7.9)	53.0 (11.7)	59.1 (15.1)	58.1 (14.5)	49.2 (9.6)	38.8 (3.8)	29.5 (−1.4)	22.6 (−5.2)	39.2 (4.0)
Mean minimum °F (°C)	10.7 (−11.8)	16.0 (−8.9)	23.5 (−4.7)	32.1 (0.1)	38.7 (3.7)	46.6 (8.1)	52.4 (11.3)	51.7 (10.9)	42.4 (5.8)	30.2 (−1.0)	21.0 (−6.1)	13.8 (−10.1)	6.8 (−14.0)
Record low °F (°C)	−18 (−28)	−15 (−26)	4 (−16)	21 (−6)	28 (−2)	33 (1)	35 (2)	42 (6)	26 (−3)	3 (−16)	−3 (−19)	−18 (−28)	−18 (−28)
Average precipitation inches (mm)	1.52 (39)	1.22 (31)	1.09 (28)	0.75 (19)	1.05 (27)	0.87 (22)	0.42 (11)	0.32 (8.1)	0.34 (8.6)	1.04 (26)	1.51 (38)	1.83 (46)	11.96 (304)
Average snowfall inches (cm)	7.7 (20)	2.0 (5.1)	0.7 (1.8)	0.0 (0.0)	0.0 (0.0)	0.0 (0.0)	0.0 (0.0)	0.0 (0.0)	0.0 (0.0)	0.0 (0.0)	1.4 (3.6)	8.7 (22)	20.5 (52)
Average precipitation days (≥ 0.01 inch)	9.3	7.2	7.1	5.1	6.2	4.6	2.7	2.0	2.4	6.3	8.5	9.5	70.9
Average snowy days (≥ 0.1 in)	5.0	1.9	0.8	0.0	0.0	0.0	0.0	0.0	0.0	0.0	1.5	5.4	14.6
Source: NOAA

== Demographics ==
Chelan, Washington – Racial and ethnic composition Note: the US Census treats Hispanic/Latino as an ethnic category. This table excludes Latinos from the racial categories and assigns them to a separate category. Hispanics/Latinos may be of any race.
Race / Ethnicity (NH = Non-Hispanic)	Pop 2000	Pop 2010	Pop 2020	% 2000	% 2010	% 2020
White alone (NH)	2,865	2,803	2,926	81.35%	72.06%	69.30%
Black or African American alone (NH)	2	7	6	0.06%	0.18%	0.14%
Native American or Alaska Native alone (NH)	49	45	9	1.39%	1.16%	0.21%
Asian alone (NH)	17	31	35	0.48%	0.80%	0.83%
Native Hawaiian or Pacific Islander alone (NH)	4	3	5	0.11%	0.08%	0.12%
Other race alone (NH)	9	2	15	0.26%	0.05%	0.36%
Mixed race or Multiracial (NH)	67	57	153	1.90%	1.47%	3.62%
Hispanic or Latino (any race)	509	942	1,073	14.45%	24.22%	25.41%
Total	3,522	3,890	4,222	100.00%	100.00%	100.00%

Historical population
Census	Pop.	Note	%±
1910	682		—
1920	896		31.4%
1930	1,403		56.6%
1940	1,738		23.9%
1950	2,157		24.1%
1960	2,402		11.4%
1970	2,837		18.1%
1980	2,802		−1.2%
1990	2,969		6.0%
2000	3,522		18.6%
2010	3,890		10.4%
2020	4,222		8.5%
U.S. Decennial Census; 2015 Estimate

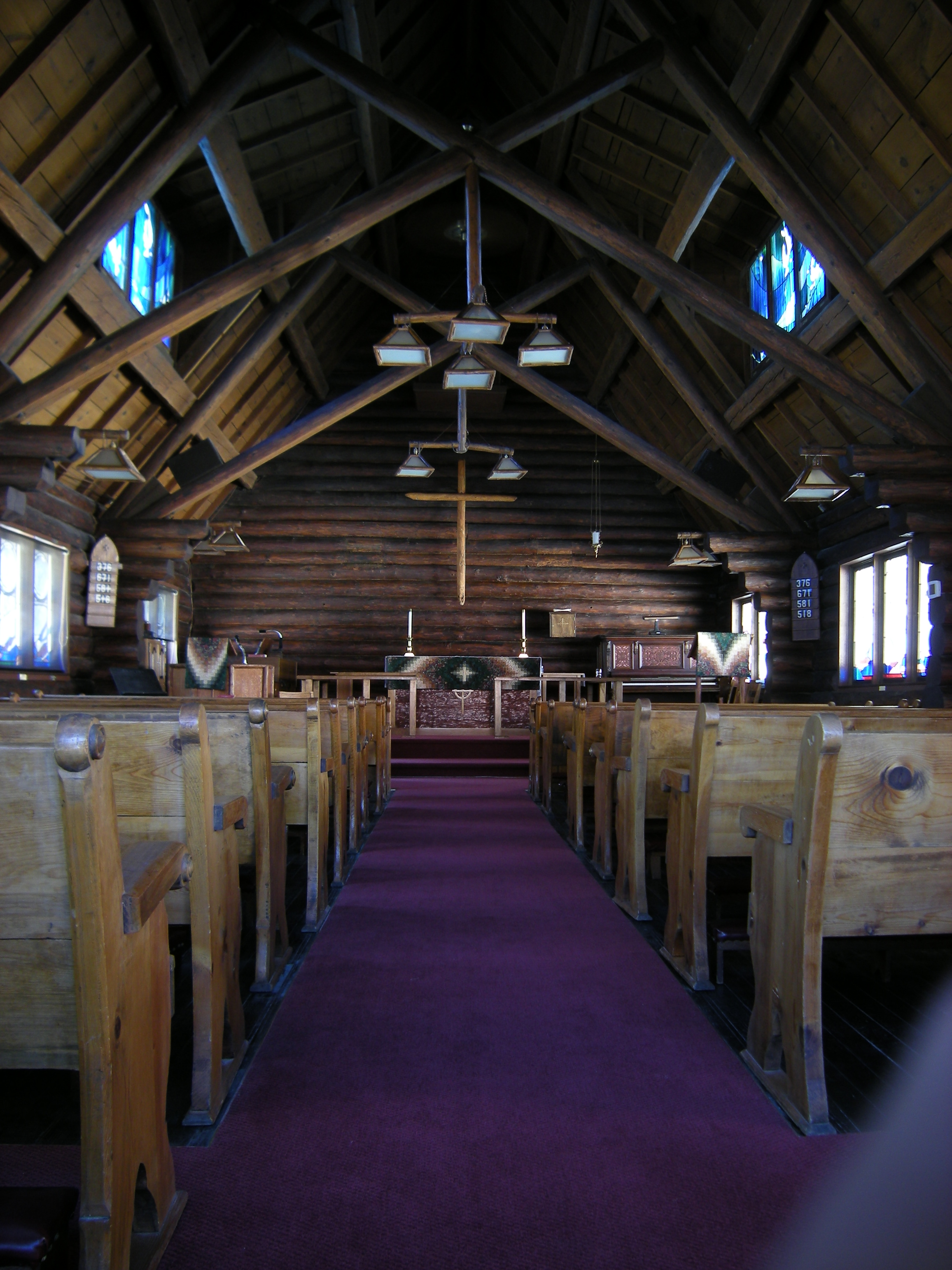
St. Andrews Episcopal Church, an 1890s log church on Woodin Avenue in downtown Chelan, is listed on the National Register of Historic Places (NRHP).

=== 2020 census ===
As of the 2020 census, Chelan had a population of 4,222. The median age was 45.4 years. 21.1% of residents were under the age of 18 and 25.1% of residents were 65 years of age or older. For every 100 females there were 95.9 males, and for every 100 females age 18 and over there were 93.3 males age 18 and over.

84.5% of residents lived in urban areas, while 15.5% lived in rural areas.

There were 1,789 households in Chelan, of which 27.2% had children under the age of 18 living in them. Of all households, 48.1% were married-couple households, 18.7% were households with a male householder and no spouse or partner present, and 26.9% were households with a female householder and no spouse or partner present. About 28.9% of all households were made up of individuals and 16.0% had someone living alone who was 65 years of age or older.

There were 2,570 housing units, of which 30.4% were vacant. The homeowner vacancy rate was 1.7% and the rental vacancy rate was 13.5%.

Racial composition as of the 2020 census
Race	Number	Percent
White	3,066	72.6%
Black or African American	10	0.2%
American Indian and Alaska Native	31	0.7%
Asian	39	0.9%
Native Hawaiian and Other Pacific Islander	5	0.1%
Some other race	698	16.5%
Two or more races	373	8.8%
Hispanic or Latino (of any race)	1,073	25.4%

=== 2010 census ===
As of the 2010 census, there were 3,890 people, 1,602 households, and 1,031 families residing in the city. The population density was 618.4 inhabitants per square mile (238.8/km^{2}). There were 2,516 housing units at an average density of 400.0 per square mile (154.4/km^{2}). The racial makeup of the city was 80.1% White, 0.4% African American, 1.4% Native American, 0.9% Asian, 0.1% Pacific Islander, 14.1% from other races, and 3.1% from two or more races. Hispanic or Latino of any race were 24.2% of the population.

There were 1,602 households, of which 29.2% had children under the age of 18 living with them, 49.1% were married couples living together, 10.6% had a female householder with no husband present, 4.7% had a male householder with no wife present, and 35.6% were non-families. 28.8% of all households were made up of individuals, and 13.1% had someone living alone who was 65 years of age or older. The average household size was 2.39 and the average family size was 2.91.

The median age in the city was 44.1 years. 22.4% of residents were under the age of 18; 7.6% were between the ages of 18 and 24; 20.9% were from 25 to 44; 30.2% were from 45 to 64; and 18.9% were 65 years of age or older. The gender makeup of the city was 49.9% male and 50.1% female.

=== 2000 census ===
As of the 2000 census, there were 3,522 people, 1,471 households, and 939 families residing in the city. The population density was 933.9 people per square mile (360.7/km^{2}). There were 2,058 housing units at an average density of 545.7 per square mile (210.8/km^{2}). The racial makeup of the city was 85.69% White, 0.11% African American, 1.53% Native American, 0.48% Asian, 0.11% Pacific Islander, 9.23% from other races, and 2.84% from two or more races. Hispanic or Latino of any race were 14.45% of the population.

There were 1,471 households, out of which 29.6% had children under the age of 18 living with them, 49.8% were married couples living together, 10.1% had a female householder with no husband present, and 36.1% were non-families. 30.5% of all households were made up of individuals, and 14.8% had someone living alone who was 65 years of age or older. The average household size was 2.35 and the average family size was 2.93.

In the city, the age distribution of the population shows 25.3% under the age of 18, 6.2% from 18 to 24, 24.6% from 25 to 44, 25.7% from 45 to 64, and 18.2% who were 65 years of age or older. The median age was 41 years. For every 100 females, there were 92.8 males. For every 100 females aged 18 and over, there were 88.4 males.

The median income for a household in the city was $28,047, and the median income for a family was $33,662. Males had a median income of $31,900 versus $21,397 for females. The per capita income for the city was $16,511. About 17.3% of families and 20.9% of the population were below the poverty line, including 31.3% of those under age 18 and 12.5% of those age 65 or over.

== Transportation ==
Chelan is served by two state highways: U.S. Route 97 Alternate, which runs south to Wenatchee, and State Route 150, which runs west to Manson. Bus services to the city are operated by Link Transit.

== Newspaper ==
- Lake Chelan Mirror

== Gallery ==
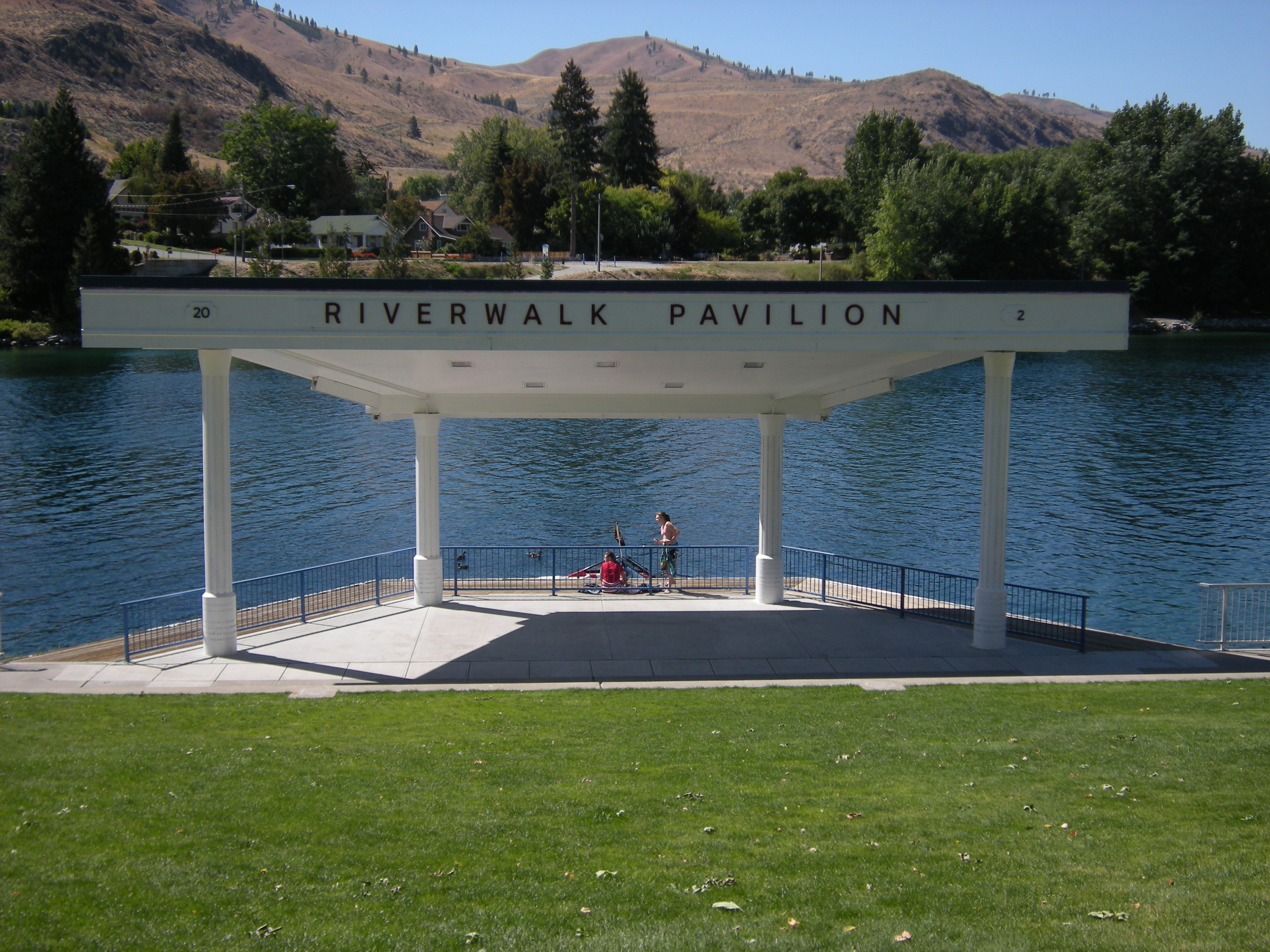
Riverwalk Pavilion

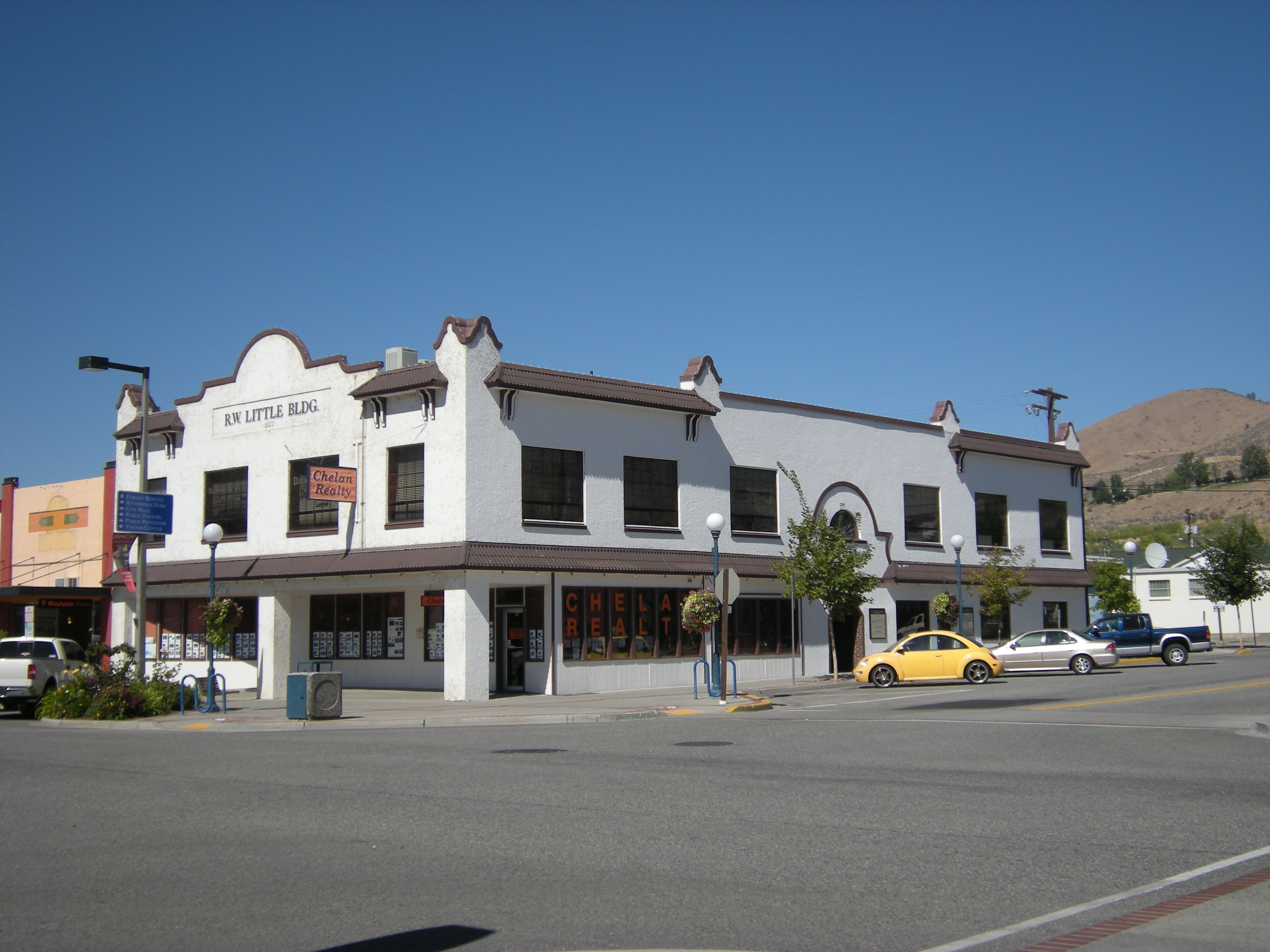
R. W. Little Building

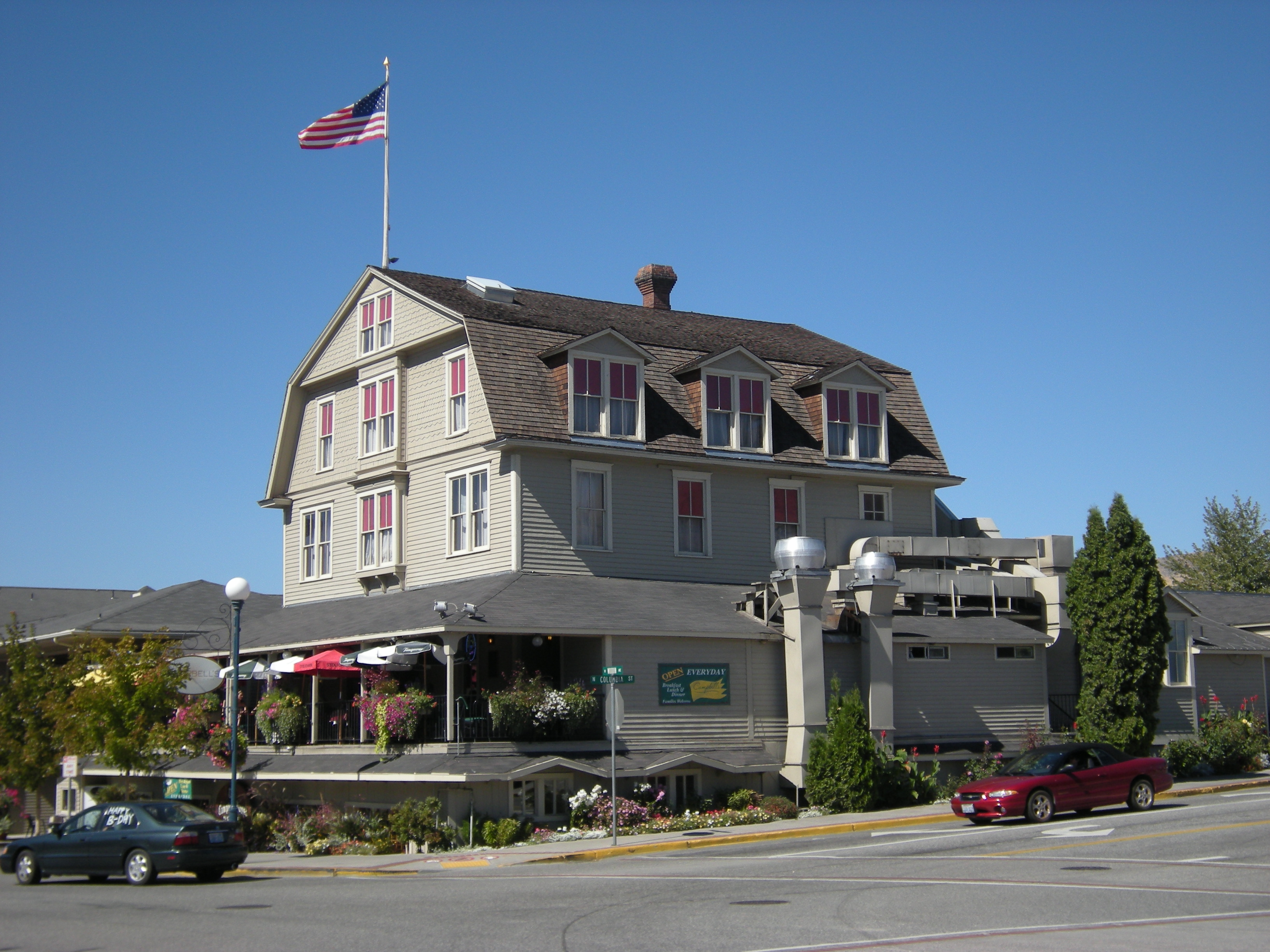
Campbell's

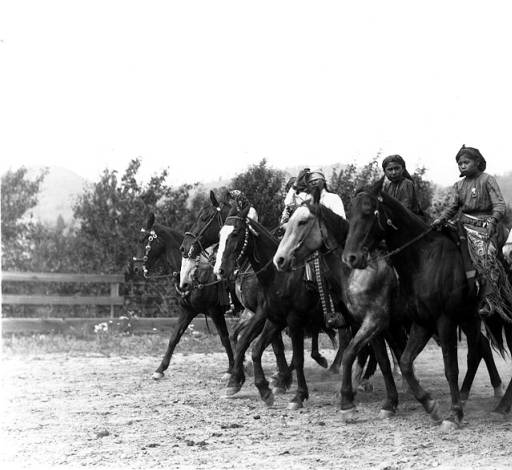
Native women on horseback, 1912

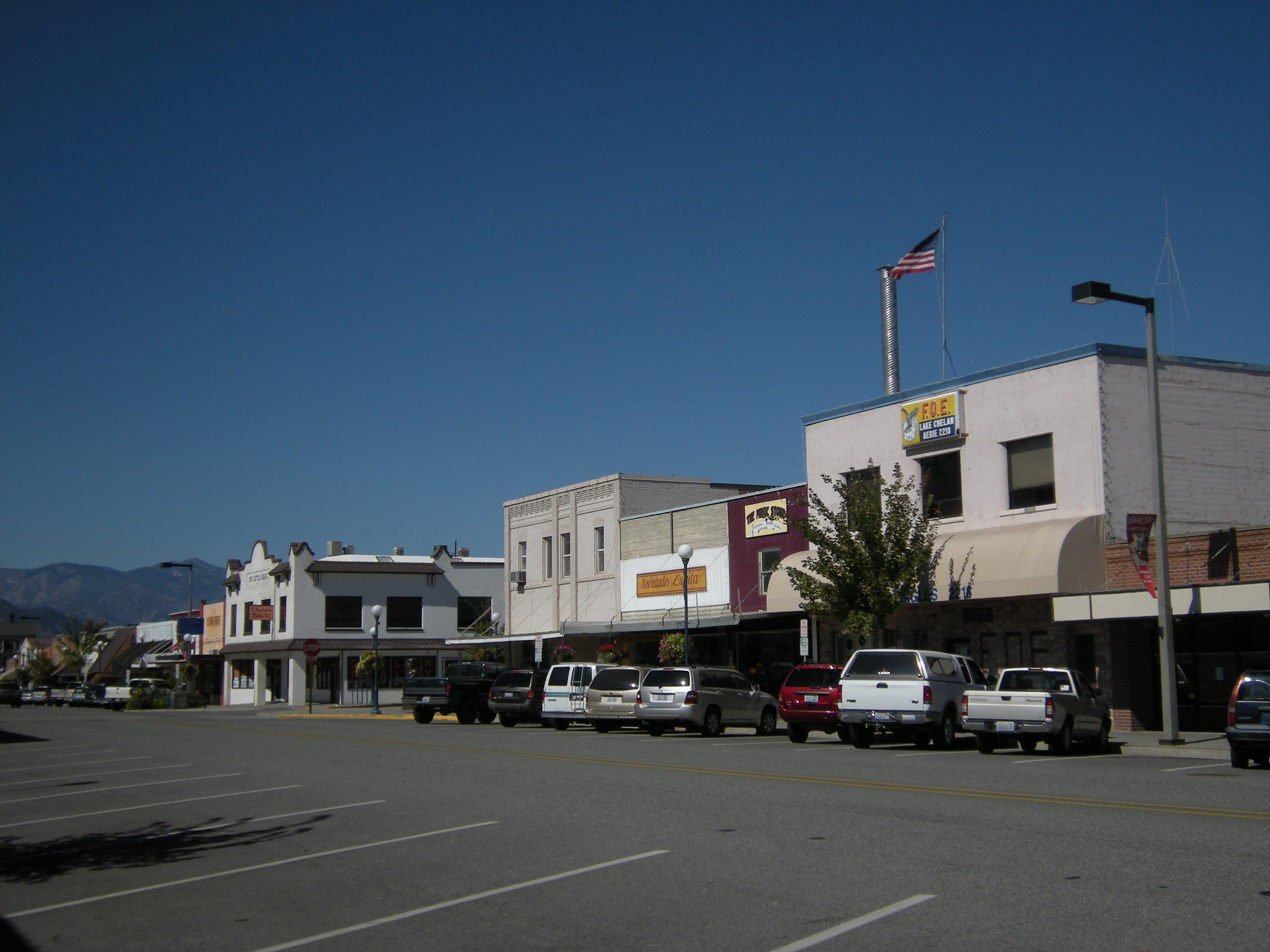
Woodin Avenue
