= 2014 Washington wildfires =

Wildfire season in Washington, United States

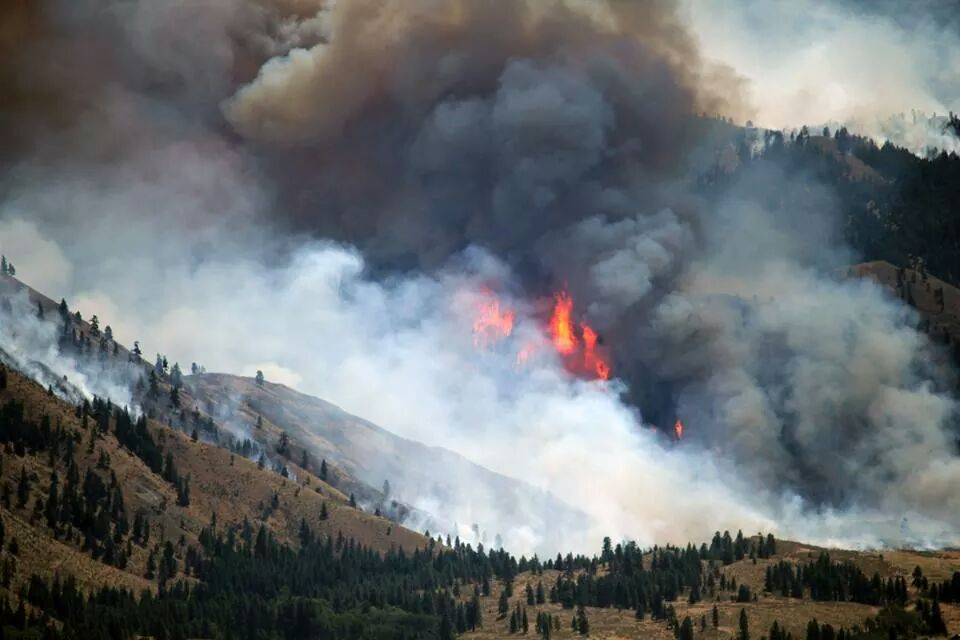
- The Carlton Complex on July 21, 2014

Statistics
- Total fires: 1,480
- Total area: 386,972 acres (1,566 km^{2})

Impacts
- Deaths: 1
- Structures lost: 300

The 2014 Washington wildfires were a series of 1,480 wildfires that burned 386,972 acres (1,566 km^{2}) over the course of 2014. The first occurred primarily on the east side of the Cascade Range in Chelan and Okanogan counties. The fires burned private land, state land, and within the Okanogan and Wenatchee National Forests, ultimately covering over 350,000 acres (550 sq mi; 1,400 km^{2}). The first fire began on July 8 near the Entiat River. On July 14 a lightning storm started dozens more fires across the eastern Cascade Range. Governor Jay Inslee declared a state of emergency, activating the Washington National Guard. More lightning strikes later in the summer started additional fires.

== Background ==
While the typical "fire season" in Washington varies every year based on weather conditions, most wildfires occur in between July and October. However, hotter, drier conditions can allow wildfires to start outside of these boundaries. Wildfires tend to start at these times of the year after moisture from winter and spring precipitation dries up. Vegetation and overall conditions are the hottest and driest in these periods. The increase of vegetation can make the fires spread easier.

== Mills Canyon fire ==
The Mills Canyon fire burned 22,571 acres (35.3 sq mi; 91.3 km^{2}), all within Chelan County. The fire was located south of the Entiat River and west of U.S. Route 97A and the Columbia River in the Entiat Mountains. It started on July 8 and the cause is under investigation.

== July 14 lightning-strike fires ==
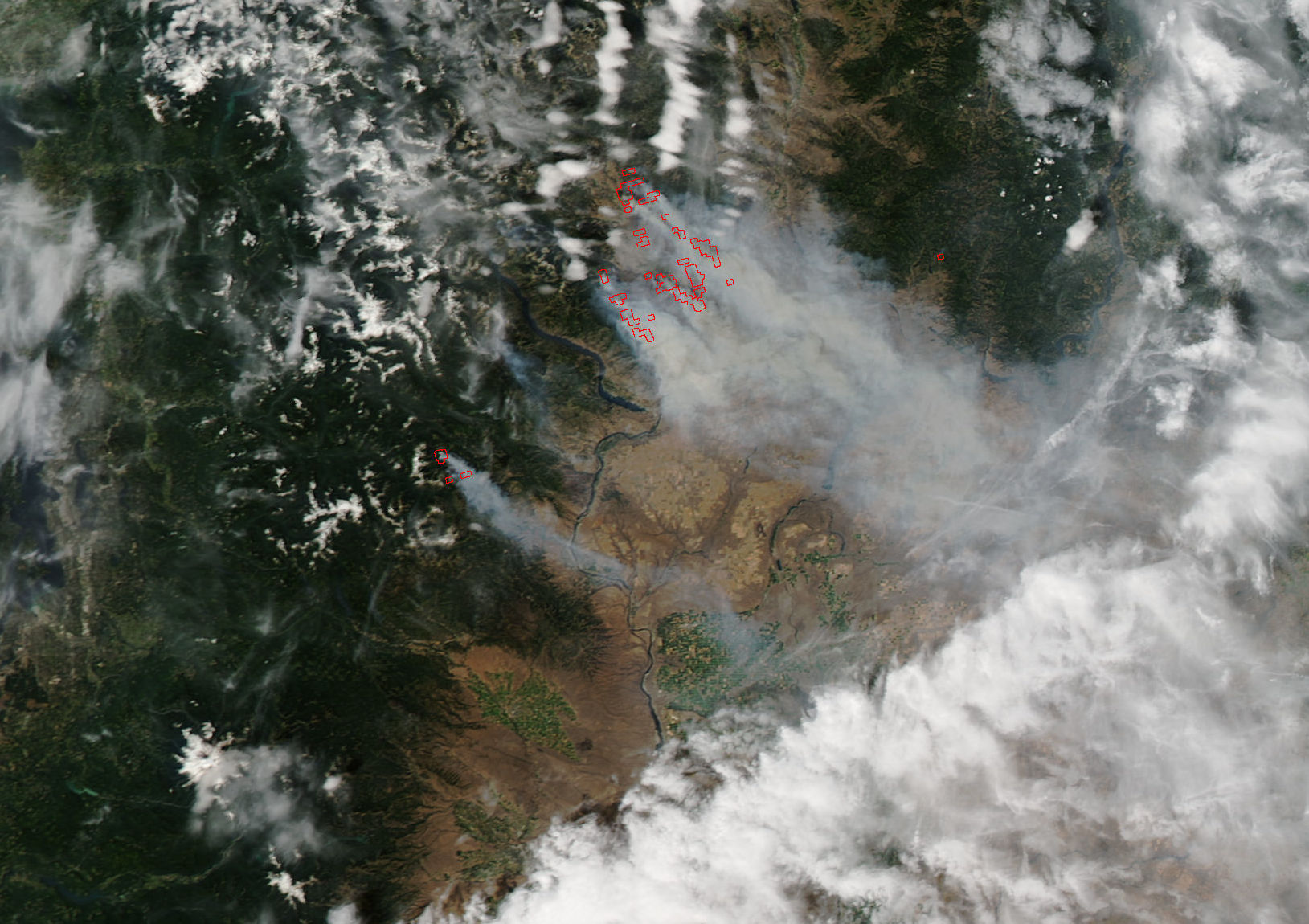
Satellite image of smoke plumes, July 18, 2014

A number of fires were started by lightning strikes on July 14.

=== Carlton Complex ===
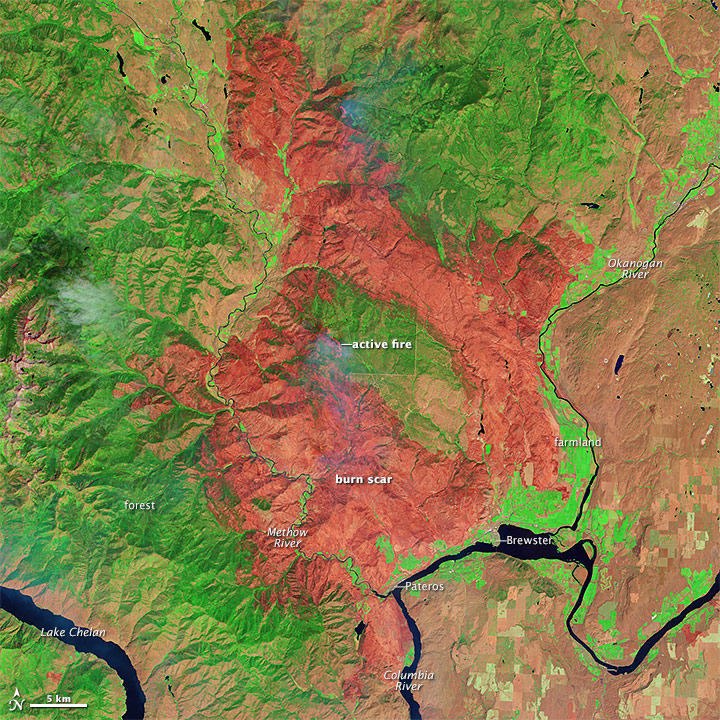
Carlton complex fire scar in false-color infrared, July 31, 2014. Burned vegetation appears red, and the most severely burned areas are generally the darkest. Unburned forests appear dark green. Actively growing farmland is bright green; unburned grasslands and brushlands are tan; and rivers are navy blue. Scale bar at lower left is 5km (3 mi.)

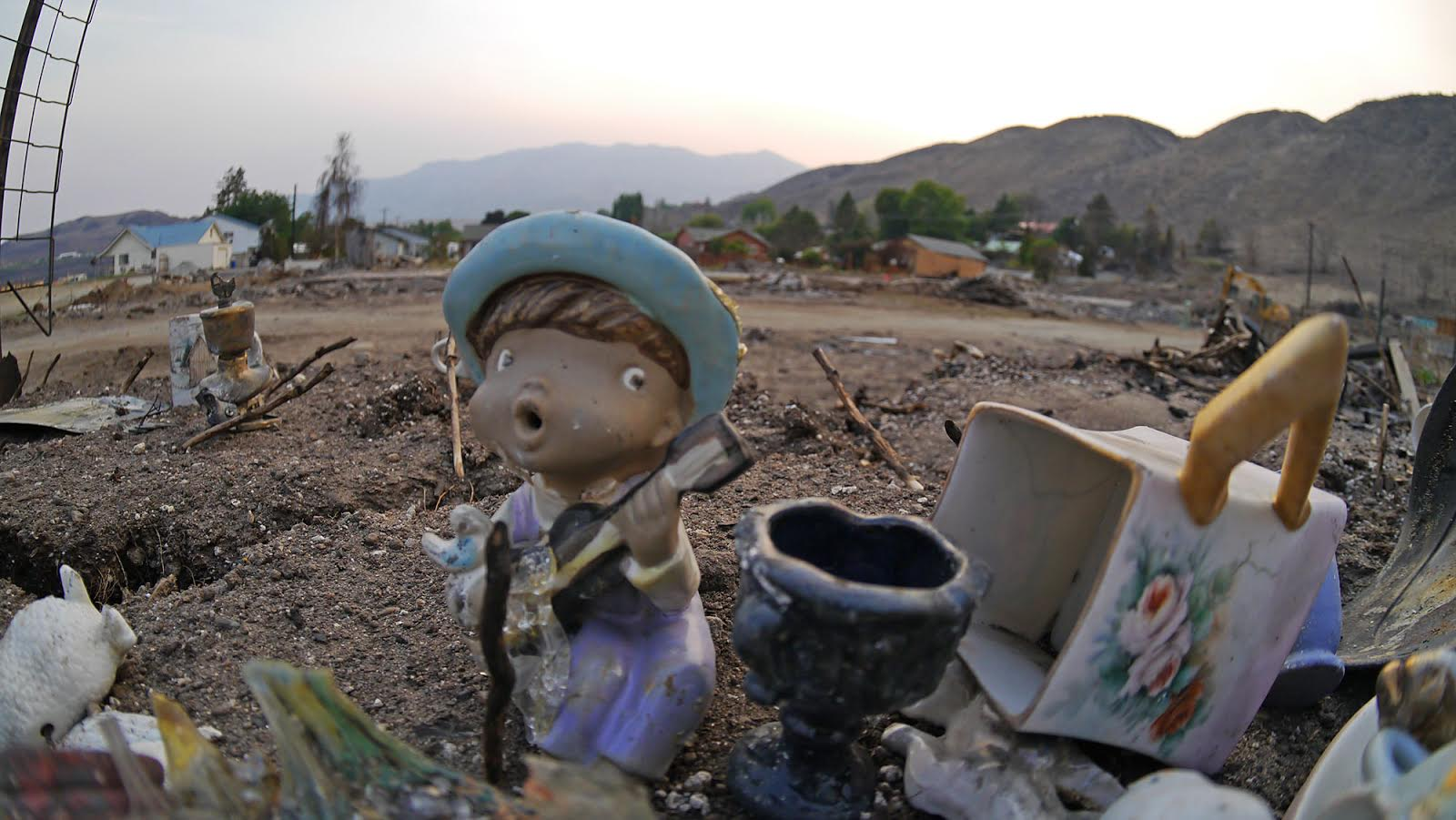
Weeks after a wildfire in 2014 destroyed much of the town of Pateros, this was all that remained of several blocks that were burned down to the foundations.

The Carlton Complex, covering 256,108 acres (400.2 sq mi; 1,036 km^{2}), began as four separate lightning-caused fires on July 14 in the Methow River valley of Okanogan County: the Cougar Flat, French Creek, Gold Hike, and Stokes fires. These fires merged and rapidly spread southeast on July 17, burning approximately 300 homes in and around the towns of Pateros and Malott as well as in more rural areas. The communities of Brewster, Carlton, and Methow were also threatened by fire. Power was lost to the communities of Twisp and Winthrop. Road closures included State Route 20 east of Twisp towards Loup Loup Pass, State Route 153 between Twisp and Pateros, and U.S. Route 97 between Pateros and Brewster. Rain slowed the fire on July 24, allowing crews to reach 60% containment by July 26. A new fire started along State Route 20 south of Winthrop on August 1.

The Carlton Complex was the largest wildfire in Washington state's recorded history, surpassing the 1902 Yacolt Burn. One death, caused by a heart attack, has been blamed on the fire. Fire fighting efforts included nearly 3,000 personnel and numerous aircraft, including seven UH-60 Black Hawk helicopters from the Washington National Guard and a DC-10 Air Tanker.

=== Chiwaukum Creek fire ===
Located northwest of Leavenworth in the Chiwaukum Mountains, this fire burned 13,895 acres (21.7 sq mi; 56.2 km^{2}). It required the closure of U.S. Route 2 and the evacuation of nearly 900 homes, threatening the communities of Coles Corner, Winton, and Plain. A pyrocumulus cloud could be seen rising above the fire from as far away as Seattle. Part of the Chiwaukum Creek Fire burned within the northeastern boundary of the Alpine Lakes Wilderness.

=== Duncan fire ===
Covering 12,659 acres (20 sq mi; 51 km^{2}), the Duncan fire was located in the upper Entiat River drainage. It began on a ridge between the Entiat River and the North Fork Entiat River, eventually spreading east across the North Fork.

=== Kelly Mountain fire ===
Located in the Entiat Mountains near Tommy Creek, the Kelly Mountain fire burned 124 acres (0.2 sq mi; 0.5 km^{2}).

=== Lone Mountain fire ===
Located in the Boulder Creek drainage northeast of Stehekin, the Lone Mountain fire burned 2,770 acres (4.3 sq mi; 11 km^{2}). It was within the Lake Chelan National Recreation Area, part of the North Cascades National Park complex.

== August 2 lightning-strike fires ==
- Devil's Elbow Complex – 26,349 acres (40 sq mi; 100 km^{2}). This complex was made up of four fires on the Colville Indian Reservation north of Keller, Washington in Ferry County. The fires required closing State Route 21.
- Hansel fire – 1,016 acres (2 sq mi; 4 km^{2}). The Hansel fire burned near Ingalls Creek and U.S. Route 97 in Chelan County.
- Little Bridge Creek fire – 4,896 acres (7.6 sq mi; 20 km^{2}). Located between the Twisp River and State Route 20 in Okanogan County.
- Shoofly fire – 160 acres (0.25 sq mi; 0.65 km^{2}) in the upper drainage of the Little Wenatchee River in Chelan County.
- Snag Canyon fire – 12,667 acres (20 sq mi; 51 km^{2}). Located north of Ellensburg in Kittitas County, the Snag Canyon fire burned six homes.
- Upper Falls fire – 8,118 acres (13 sq mi; 33 km^{2}). This fire burned in the Okanogan National Forest west of the Chewuch River.

== South Cle Elum Ridge fire ==
This fire was reported on August 7 on the Wenatchee National Forest southwest of Cle Elum in Kittitas County and burned 894 acres (1.4 sq mi; 3.6 km^{2}).

== See also ==
- List of Washington wildfires
