= Alta Lake State Park =

Park in the U.S. state of Washington

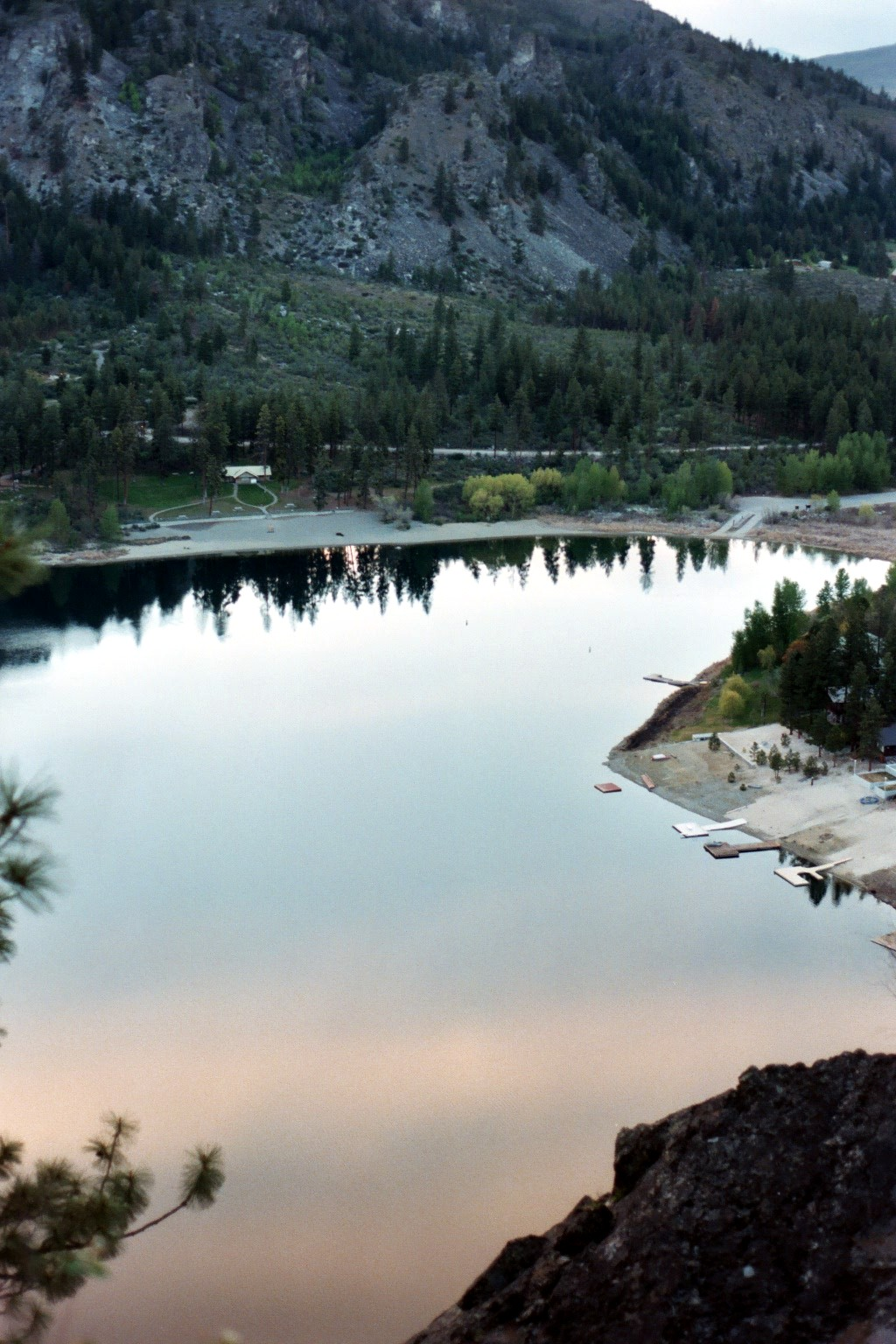

- Location within Washington (state) Location within the United States
- Location: Okanogan County, Washington, United States
- Nearest city: Pateros, Washington
- Coordinates: 48°01′12″N 119°56′16″W
- Area: 181 acres (73 ha)
- Elevation: 1,171 ft (357 m)
- Established: 1951
- Administrator: Washington State Parks and Recreation Commission
- Visitors: 146,779 (in 2024)
- Website: Official website
- Alta Lake
- Location within Washington
- Location: Okanogan County, Washington
- Coordinates: 48°01′17″N 119°56′13″W
- Primary inflows: None
- Primary outflows: None
- Basin countries: United States
- Max. length: 2 miles (3.2 km)
- Max. width: .5 miles (0.80 km)
- Surface area: 219.6 acres (88.9 ha)
- Max. depth: 79 feet (24 m)
- Water volume: 7,230 acre-feet (8,920,000 m^{3})
- Surface elevation: 1,171 feet (357 m)
- Islands: None
- Settlements: State park

Alta Lake State Park is a public recreation area located two miles (3.2 km) southwest of Pateros, Washington, at the northern end of 220-acre (89 ha) Alta Lake, in the mountainous northwest interior of the state. The 181-acre (73 ha) state park and adjacent lake lie beneath towering stone cliffs, formed by glaciation, that rise 1000 feet (304 m) above the valley floor, and carry on up to the top of Old Goat Mountain which sits 4200 ft (1280 m) above the park. A two-mile-long (3 km) road leading to the park, Alta Lake Road, intersects State Route 153, which runs along the Methow River. The park is managed by the Washington State Parks and Recreation Commission.

== History ==
A jeweler and miner from Wilbur named the lake in 1900 after his daughter, Alta Heinz. In 1951, the city of Pateros gave the property to the state for the establishment of a state park. In 2014, the park was severely damaged during the Carlton Complex Fire, which forced the park to close for five weeks.

== Activities and amenities ==
The park offers swimming, boating, fishing and sailboarding on Alta Lake, which measures about 2 miles (3.2 km) long and .5 miles (0.80 km) wide. The park has camping and picnicking facilities and 2 miles (3.2 km) of hiking trails. Golf is offered at the nearby Alta Lake Golf Course.
