= Carlton Complex Fire =

2014 wildfire in Washington state, US

- Part of the 2014 Washington wildfires
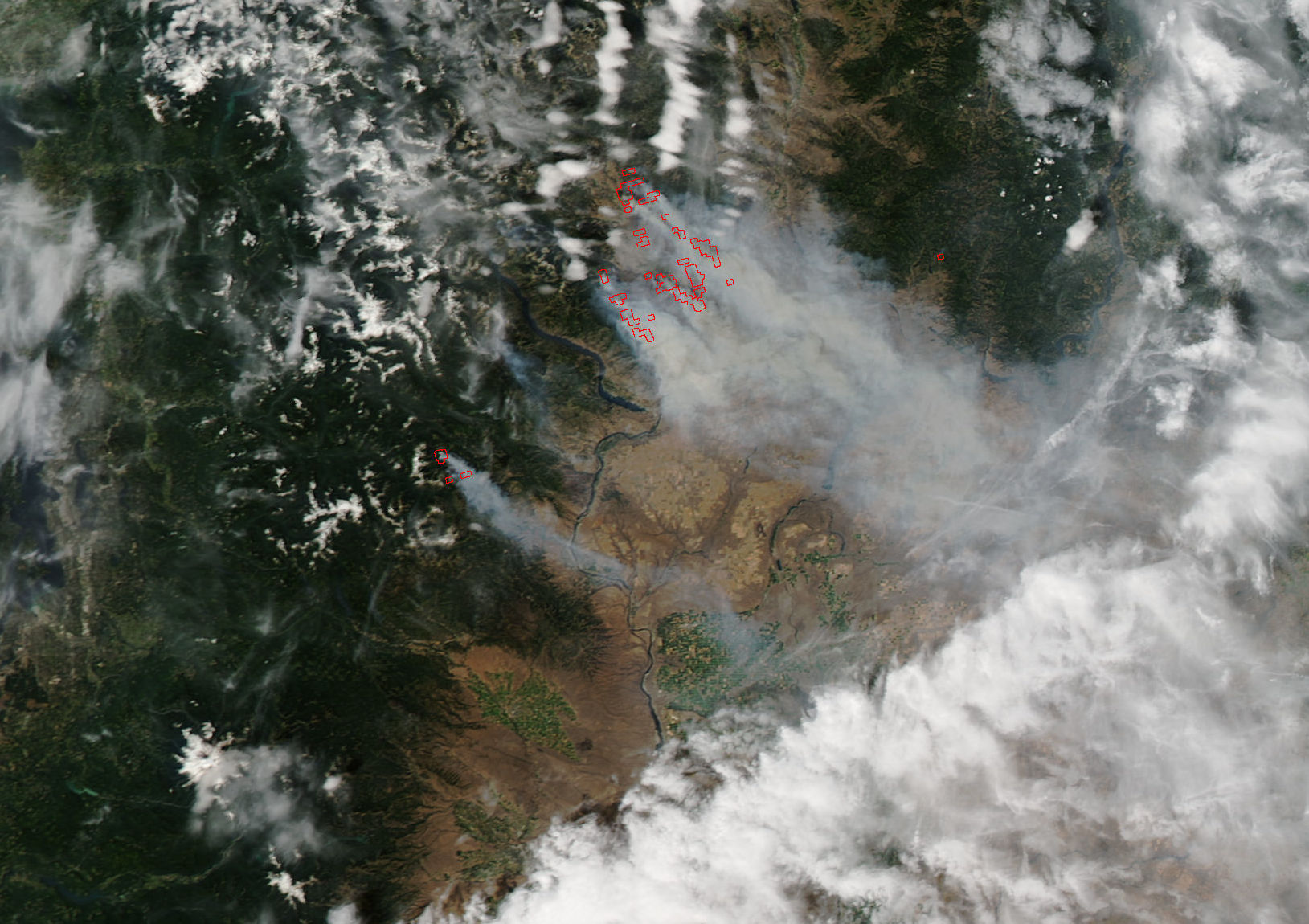
- A NASA satellite image of smoke plumes, July 18, 2014
- Date: July 14, 2014 — August 24, 2014
- Location: Okanogan County, Washington
- Coordinates: 48.211°N 120.103°W

Statistics
- Burned area: 256,108 acres (1,036 km^{2})

Impacts
- Deaths: 2
- Structures destroyed: 353 homes; 149 other structures
- Cost: $60 million (2014 USD)

Ignition
- Cause: Lightning

Map
- Location within Washington (state)

The Carlton Complex Fire was a massive wildfire in north central Washington which burned 256,108 acres (1,036.4 km^{2}) during the 2014 Washington wildfire season. It began on July 14, 2014, as four separate lightning-caused fires in the Methow Valley which merged into one by July 18. The complex destroyed 353 homes in and around the towns of Pateros and Brewster, as well as rural Okanogan County. The fire caused an estimated $98 million (2014 USD) in damages. The Carlton Complex remains the largest single wildfire in Washington state history, surpassing the 1902 Yacolt Burn.

== Events ==
The Carlton Complex Fire began as four relatively small fires (the Stokes Fire, the Gold Hikes Fire, the French Creek Fire and the Cougar Flat Fire) which were ignited by lightning strikes in the Methow Valley on July 14. A low snowpack and lack of precipitation that spring, along with two weeks of high temperatures and low humidity had created an extreme fire risk in the region. Three of the fires burned near the town of Carlton, and one near Pearrygin Lake State Park. A smokejumper pilot based out of nearby Winthrop noticed the Gold Hikes fire in its early stages, but the Washington State Department of Natural Resources sent the crew to fight a wildfire in Oregon rather than contain the local fires.

By July 15, the Stokes Fire had grown to 600 acres (2.4 km^{2}) and seven homeowners in the Carlton area had been advised to evacuate. The following day, eleven homes in the Methow Valley were destroyed, and the fire jumped both the Methow River and Washington State Route 153. The Federal Emergency Management Agency authorized the use of federal funds, and a national fire management team took control of the firefighting efforts.

Due to hot, dry conditions and wind gusts of up to 30 miles per hour (48 km/h), the fire grew significantly on July 17, expanding in all directions. Plumes of smoke rose over 25,000 feet (7,600 m) in the air, large enough for the fire to generate its own weather. Embers picked up by the plume created spot fires up to 1 mile (1.6 km) away. The total size of the complex increased from about 18,000 acres (72.8 km^{2}) that morning to 167,712 acres (678.7 km^{2}) by the end of the day. During a single nine-hour period, the fire grew at an average rate of 3.8 acres (15,000 m^{2}) per second.

That evening, at around 8 pm Pacific Daylight Time, the fire reached the town of Pateros. The town had been considered safe, as it is surrounded by a large 158-acre (0.6 km^{2}) apple orchard, which would typically serve as a firebreak. The Okanogan County Sheriff's Office placed the entire town under evacuation notice shortly before the fire arrived. Sheriff's deputies and fire crews drove around town giving evacuation orders by megaphone. The next day, the Sheriff's Office estimated that 95 homes in the area had been destroyed.

On July 18, the fires converged near Brewster, creating one large, continuous wildfire. The entire town of Malott was evacuated, as were some areas near Brewster and Winthrop.

Weather conditions helped to slow the growth of the fire over the next few days, although there was still very little containment by firefighters. Firefighting crews from around the country began to arrive, and there were 1,622 personnel working to suppress the fire by July 20.

Rain slowed the fire on July 24, allowing crews to reach 60% containment by July 26. The number of firefighting personnel rose to around 3,000. As firefighting efforts intensified and the weather continued to become cooler and more humid, crews were gradually able to control the fire. On August 24, over a month after the fires began, the Carlton Complex was declared 100% contained.

== Aftermath ==
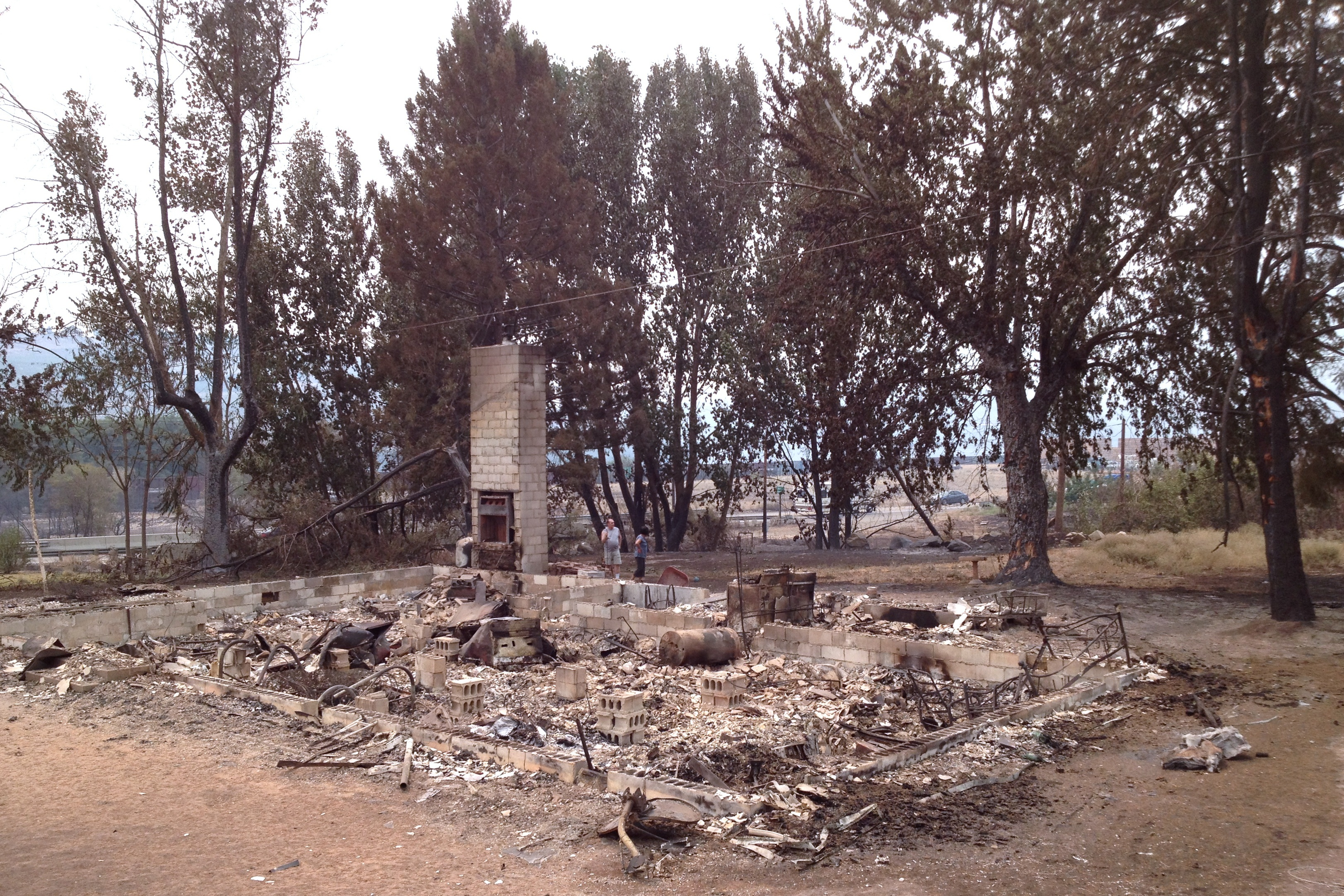
A home near Pateros, Washington destroyed by the Carlton Complex Fire

In total, the Carlton Complex Fire burned 256,108 acres (1,036.4 km^{2}) throughout Okanogan County, Washington. 353 homes were destroyed, including 111 in the Pateros area and 47 near the town of Brewster. The fire also caused extensive agricultural damage—fruit trees and cattle grazing land were damaged, and power supplies, irrigation systems and fencing were destroyed. Economic damage was estimated at $98 million (2014 USD). Fire suppression of the Carlton Complex cost the state at least $60 million.

While there were no deaths caused by burns or smoke inhalation, two deaths are indirectly attributed to the fire. One man suffered a heart attack while protecting his home, and another never fully recovered after falling from a bulldozer while defending family property.

The fire surpassed the size of the 1902 Yacolt Burn in southwest Washington, making it the largest single fire in state history. The following year, during the 2015 wildfire season, Okanogan County experienced another large complex of fires. The Okanogan Complex—located slightly to the east of where the Carlton Complex had burned—consumed an even greater amount of land, although it never converged into a single fire.

In October 2014, around 70 property owners filed property damage claims against the state worth a total of more than $9 million, alleging that the state Department of Natural Resources (DNR) was negligent in responding to the fires, some of which began on DNR land. The claims were denied by the Washington Attorney General's office.

== See also ==
- 2014 Washington wildfires
- Cinder (bear), a bear cub recovered with burns after the wildfire
