= Okanogan Complex Fire =

2015 wildfire in Washington, United States

- Part of the 2015 Washington wildfires
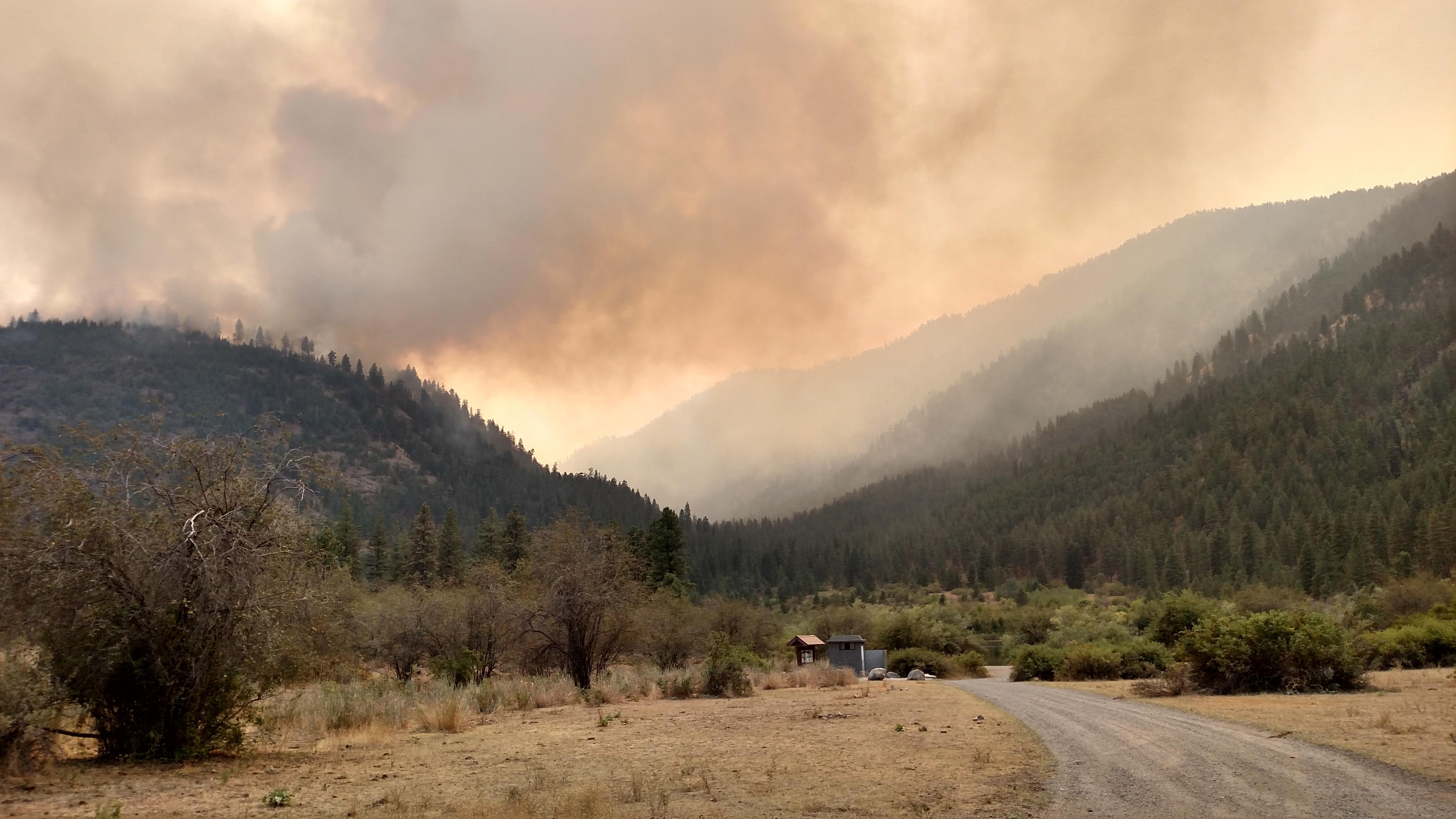
- Smoke from the fire on August 25
- Date: August 15, 2015 – September 19, 2015
- Location: Okanogan County, Washington
- Coordinates: 48.519°N 119.662°W

Statistics
- Burned area: 304,782 acres (123,341 ha) as of August 30

Impacts
- Deaths: 3
- Injuries: 7
- Structures destroyed: 120 destroyed homes
- Cost: $44.5 million

Ignition
- Cause: Lightning

Map
- Location within Washington (state)

The Okanogan Complex Fire was a wildfire affecting Okanogan County in north-central Washington state. It was composed of five fires that were caused by lightning strikes on August 15, 2015, with two of the fires near Conconully merging days later on August 19. At its peak, it burned over 304,782 acres (123,341 ha) of land and forced the evacuations of numerous towns, including Conconully, Twisp and Winthrop. Over 1,250 firefighters were deployed to the Okanogan Complex. Three United States Forest Service firefighters were killed in an accident near Twisp on August 19. Traditional methods of containing such wildfires, such as creating bulldozer lines, were not readily available due to the irregular terrain and because an inversion layer trapped smoke in the valley, making it difficult to fly in water by helicopter.

On August 24, some media outlets reported that it had become the largest wildfire in Washington state history, surpassing the Carlton Complex fire of 2014. The Okanogan Complex fire did not merge into a single fire, and so the Carlton Complex remains the state's largest single fire.

By August 25 more help was arriving and no more structures had burned. However, nearly all the fires had continued "to grow with little containment gained" and higher winds were predicted by the end of the week that would feed the flames. On August 25, 2015, there were 1,345 firefighters and 15 percent of the fire had been contained.

By September 19, the fire was 95% contained and management was turned over to local firefighters.

== Twisp River fire ==
The Twisp River Fire was one of the five fires that comprised the Okanogan Complex Fire. It was reported on August 19 at 12:23 Pacific Daylight Time. The fire started when tree branches struck a nearby powerline. By 06:00 hours on August 20, it was reported to be 7,231 acres and had reached the outskirts of Twisp, Washington. The fire's final reported acreage on August 26 was 11,922 acres.

=== Fatalities and entrapment ===
After units responded to the fire, winds suddenly changed and the fire more than doubled in size in approximately 15 minutes. Three Forest Service (FS) fatalities and one critical injury occurred on Engine 642. Two Washington Department of Natural Resources (DNR) employees and a contract dozer operator were also entrapped in the fire but survived with minor injuries; all three sought refuge in a garage and then later deployed their fire shelters. Several other engines encountered severe fire conditions.

On May 30, 2018, a lawsuit was filed against Okanogan County Electric Cooperative by Daniel Lyon, the lone survivor of Engine 642, who was severely burned in the fire.

== See also ==
- 2015 Washington state wildfires
