= Cinder (bear) =

Bear found after a fire in 2013

Cinder (January 2013 – October 2017) was a bear found badly burned as a cub after the Carlton Complex fire in Washington state, United States. She was rehabilitated and released and became an emblem of the region's will to recover. She appears to have been killed by a hunter.

As a cub about one and a half years old, Cinder was discovered by Steve Love on his property on French Creek in the Methow Valley on July 31, 2014, two weeks after the wildfires. With third-degree burns on her paws, she was dragging herself on her elbows. She accepted apricots, dog food, and water from Love, who also spent time with her that night after he heard her crying. The next day, an officer with the Washington State Department of Fish and Wildlife captured her with a catch pole; at about 39 pounds (18 kg) she was too small to tranquilize. (Normal weight for her age would have been about 80 pounds (36 kg).) She was hiding under a horse trailer and was unable to run away fast because of her injuries. She was treated by a veterinarian for extensive burns and sores on her elbows; he described her burns as the worst he had ever seen, and Rich Beausoleil, the departmental bear and cougar specialist who took charge of her (and fed her yogurt and dog food), also later said, "That was the worse case I’ve ever seen". Two days later she was transported by Pilots N Paws, a volunteer pilot organization, to Lake Tahoe Wildlife Care Inc. in South Lake Tahoe, California, where because of her burned paws she was initially provided with a ramp to reach her sleeping loft. Her medication was administered in muffins coated in syrup.

In November 2014, after her paws healed and her weight rose to 83 pounds (38 kg), she was transferred for the winter to Idaho Black Bear Rehabilitation in Garden City, where she became friends with Kaulana (Hawaiian for "quiet"), a male cub who was a year younger. They were released together in a forest north of Leavenworth, Washington, in June 2015, at which time Cinder weighed 124.3 pounds (56.4 kg), about 40 pounds (18 kg) over normal to provide a cushion while she accustomed herself to finding food. She was ear-tagged and tattooed for identification and fitted with a radio transmitter collar to track her movements, and the release was witnessed by the pilot who had flown her to Lake Tahoe and press including a CBS crew from Los Angeles. Researchers examined her and changed her collar during hibernation in February 2017.

Kaulana, who had roamed less widely than Cinder, was killed by a hunter during bear hunting season around October 2015. Cinder's collar stopped transmitting in October 2017, and in September 2018 workers with Fish and Game retrieving cameras that had been set up in December to record her found her skeletonized body with the collar cut off and lying nearby; she is presumed to have also been killed by a hunter.

Cinder became an inspiration for the area affected by the Carlton Complex fires. A camp for child burn victims, Camp Eyabsut in North Bend, Washington, adopted her as a mascot and an interactive online children's book, Cinder the Bear, by Barbara deRubertis, benefited Lake Tahoe Wildlife Care and Idaho Black Bear Rehabilitation.

== See also ==
- List of individual bears
