= OCD (disambiguation) =

OCD, or obsessive–compulsive disorder, is a mental disorder involving obsessions and compulsions.

OCD may also refer to:

== Medical uses ==
- Obsessive–compulsive personality disorder (OCPD), a mental disorder that is often mistakenly called OCD
- On-call duty, a long shift that may be assigned to medical residents
- Ortho-Clinical Diagnostics, an American company
- Osteochondritis dissecans, a painful joint condition in humans and other animals

== Computing ==
- OCD, the file suffix used by OCAD mapping software
- Object collision detection
- On-chip debugging
- OpenOCD (Open On-Chip Debugger), a debugger mostly used in embedded software development.

== Offices and institutions ==
- Office of Civil Defense, the National Emergency Management Agency of the Philippines
- Office of Civilian Defense, a World War II–era U.S. government agency
- Office of Community Development, a part of the U.S. Department of Agriculture's rural development activities
- Office of Cultural Development, a part of the Louisiana Department of Culture, Recreation and Tourism

== Christianity ==
- OCD, the acronym for the Order of Discalced Carmelites (from the Latin, Ordo Carmelitarum Discalceatorum)

== Other ==
- "O.C.D.", a song by Suicide Silence from their third album The Black Crown
- Obsessive Completion Distinction, an achievement demanding extraordinary attention to detail in the video game World of Goo
- Octavian County Day School, a school attended by characters of Lisi Harrison's The Clique books
- OCD overdrive pedal by Fulltone
- "OCD", a song by Fitz and the Tantrums from All the Feels, 2019
- "OCD", a song by Logic featuring Dwn2Earth
- "OCD", a song by the Godfathers from Alpha Beta Gamma Delta, 2022
- A 1999 cassette album by the noise musician Prurient
- Offshore Development Center
- Okanogan Conservation District
- Oxford Classical Dictionary
