= Cascade Loop Scenic Byway =

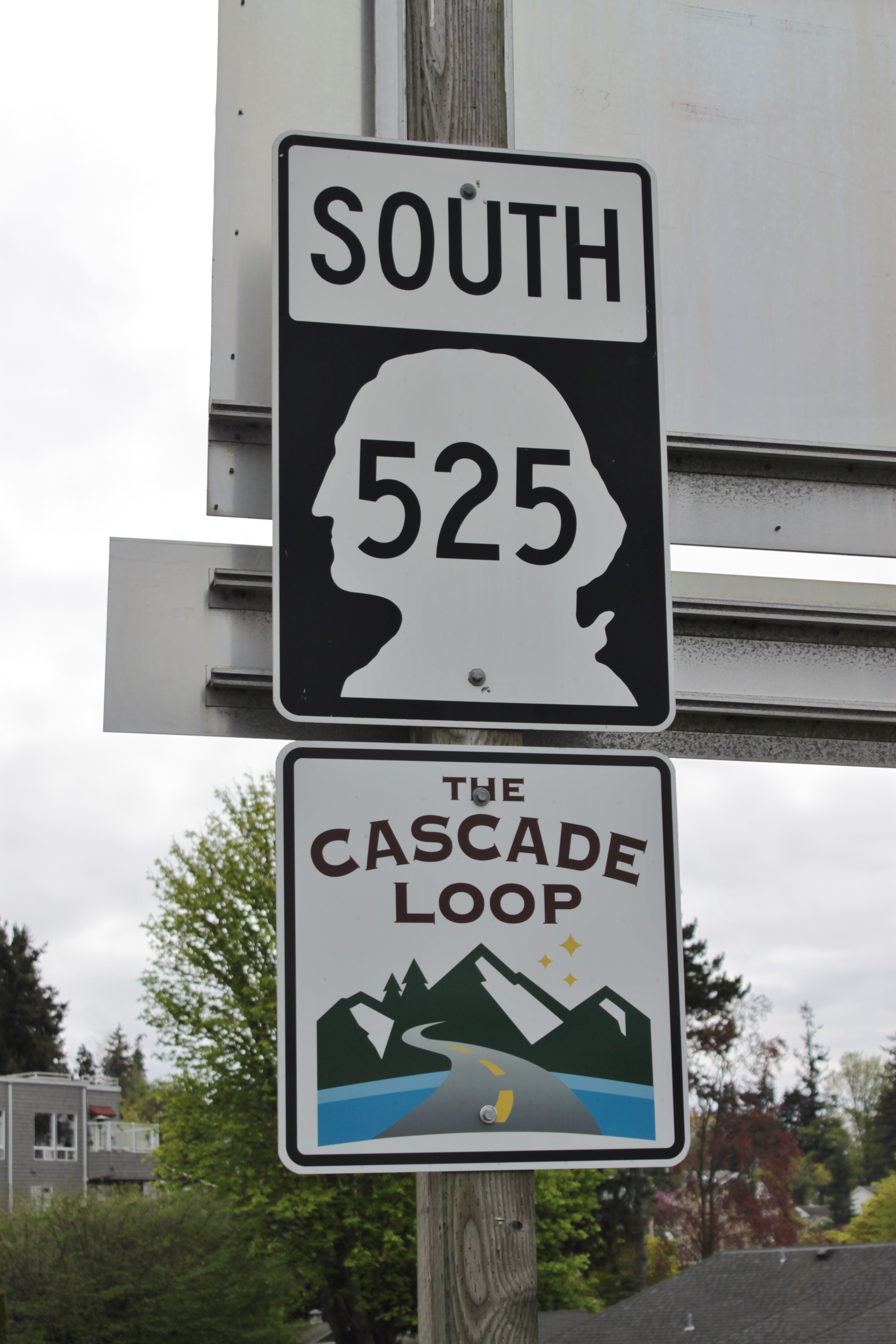
Cascade Loop sign on SR 525 in Mukilteo.

The Cascade Loop Scenic Byway is a 440-mile-long (710 km) National Scenic Byway and Washington State Scenic and Recreational Highway encircling the North Cascades in the U.S. state of Washington. It follows eight different numbered highways:

- US 2 from Everett to Sunnyslope;
- US 97 Alternate from Sunnyslope to Chelan;
- US 97 from Chelan to Pateros;
- SR 153 from Pateros to Twisp;
- SR 20 from Twisp to Coupeville;
- SR 525 from Coupeville to Mukilteo;
- SR 526 from Mukilteo to Everett; and
- I-5 in Everett

== History ==
From 2012 to 2015, the Washington State Department of Transportation and Plug-In North Central Washington built 32 charging stations at popular destinations along the Cascade Loop, spaced 25 to 50 miles (40 to 80 km) apart, to serve electric vehicles. Additional charging stations belonging to city governments, businesses and homeowners were added to the byway's list of electric charging stations in 2017.

The Cascade Loop was designated as a National Scenic Byway on January 19, 2021.
