= Methow =

Methow may refer to:

- Methow people, a Native American tribe in Washington State
- Methow, Washington
- Methow River
