= 2015 Washington wildfires =

Wildfire season in Washington, United States

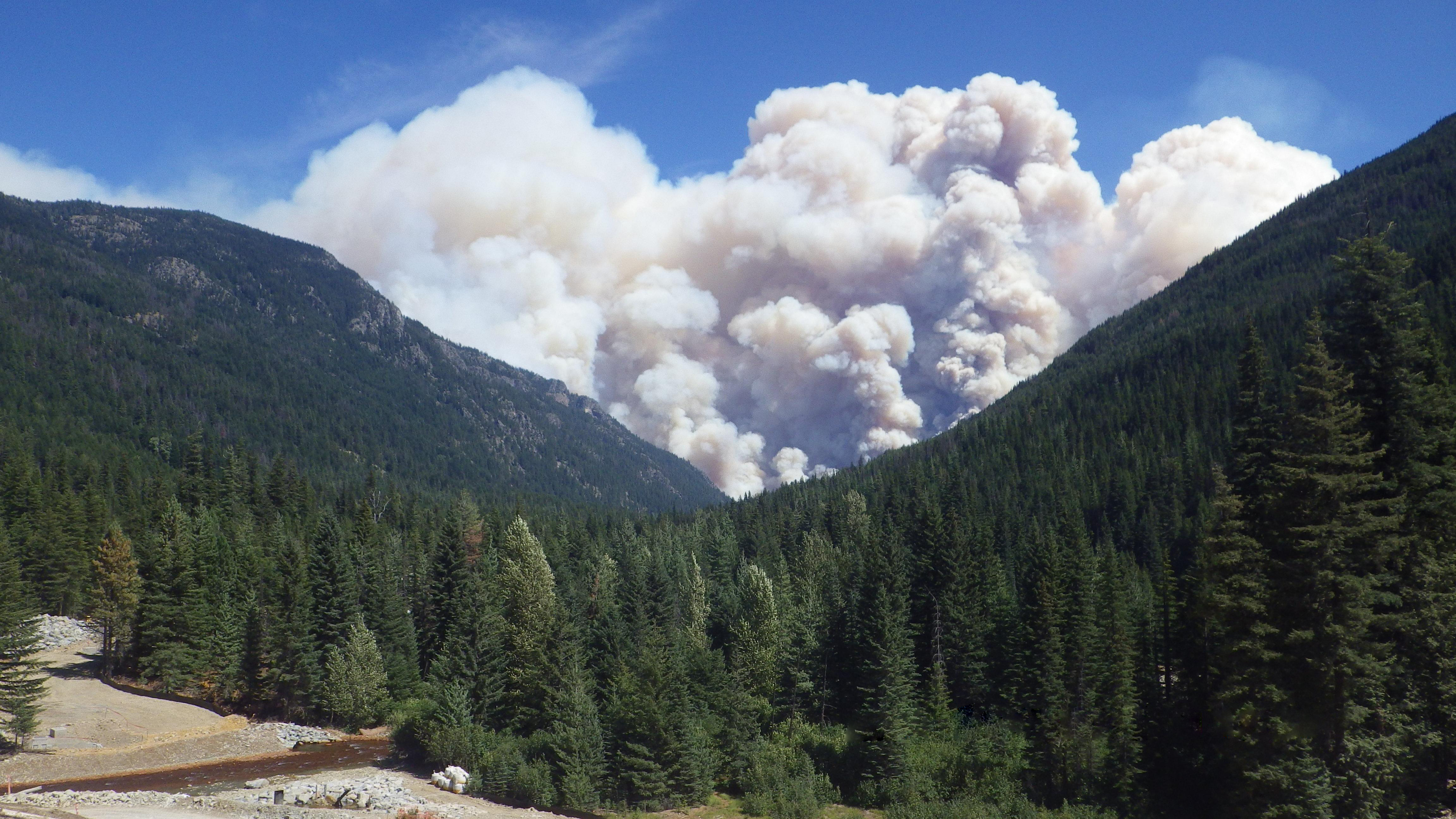
- Smoke plume over the Wolverine Fire on August 4

Statistics
- Total fires: 1,541
- Total area: 1,005,423 acres (406,880 ha)

Impacts
- Deaths: 3
- Injuries: 4
- Cost: $253 million

The 2015 wildfire season was the largest in Washington state history, with more than one million acres (400,000 ha; 1,600 sq mi) burning across the state from June to September. As many as 3,000 firefighters including 800 Washington National Guard members were deployed to fight the fires. The 17th Field Artillery Brigade of the United States Army also deployed 200 soldiers from Joint Base Lewis–McChord to help fight the fires.

On August 21, President Barack Obama declared the fires a federal emergency. Because of the enormous extent of the fire activity, for the first time in Washington state history, officials asked residents to volunteer to assist in fighting the wildfires. On August 24, the Washington Department of Natural Resources announced the Okanogan Complex fire had become the largest fire complex in Washington State history.

The Washington State Department of Natural Resources called the season the "worst-ever" in the state's history.

== Background ==
While the typical "fire season" in Washington varies every year based on weather conditions, most wildfires occur in between July and October. However, hotter, drier conditions can allow wildfires to start outside of these boundaries. Wildfires tend to start at these times of the year after moisture from winter and spring precipitation dries up. Vegetation and overall conditions are the hottest and driest in these periods. The increase of vegetation can make the fires spread easier.

== Progression and response ==
=== June ===
June 2015 was a remarkably hot month for the state of Washington, with average temperatures between 4 and 9 °F (2 and 5 °C) above normal conditions, setting new records.

By June 23, there had already been 313 wildfires across the state.

==== Governor's action ====
Governor Jay Inslee issued a proclamation on June 26, declaring a state of emergency to exist in all Washington state counties, implementing the Washington State Comprehensive Emergency Management Plan, and ordering deployment of National Guard and other organized militia for incident-related service assistance, all because of the predicted risk of wildfires in the wake of significantly drier-than-average weather in June. The Commissioner of Public Lands Peter J. Goldmark, head of the Washington Department of Natural Resources, issued an updated burn ban to the one issued June 22, as the earlier ban was superseded by the Governor's proclamation. The Commissioner's prohibition of campfires in state forests, state parks and state forestlands until September 30, 2015, was issued June 26, 2015.

==== Sleepy Hollow fire ====
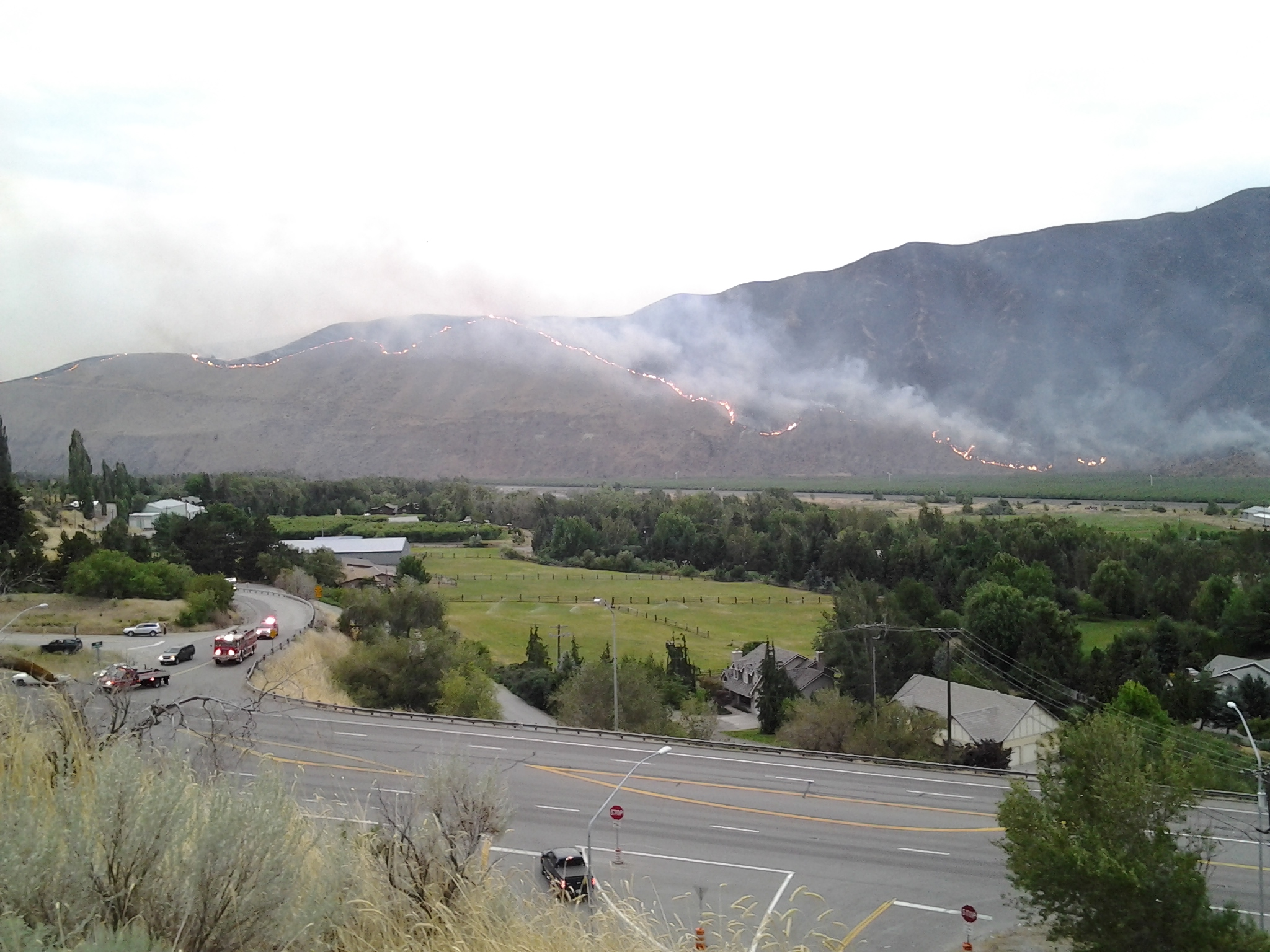
Sleepy Hollow Fire (2015) in Monitor close to where it was ignited, heading over the ridge and into the town of Wenatchee, WA

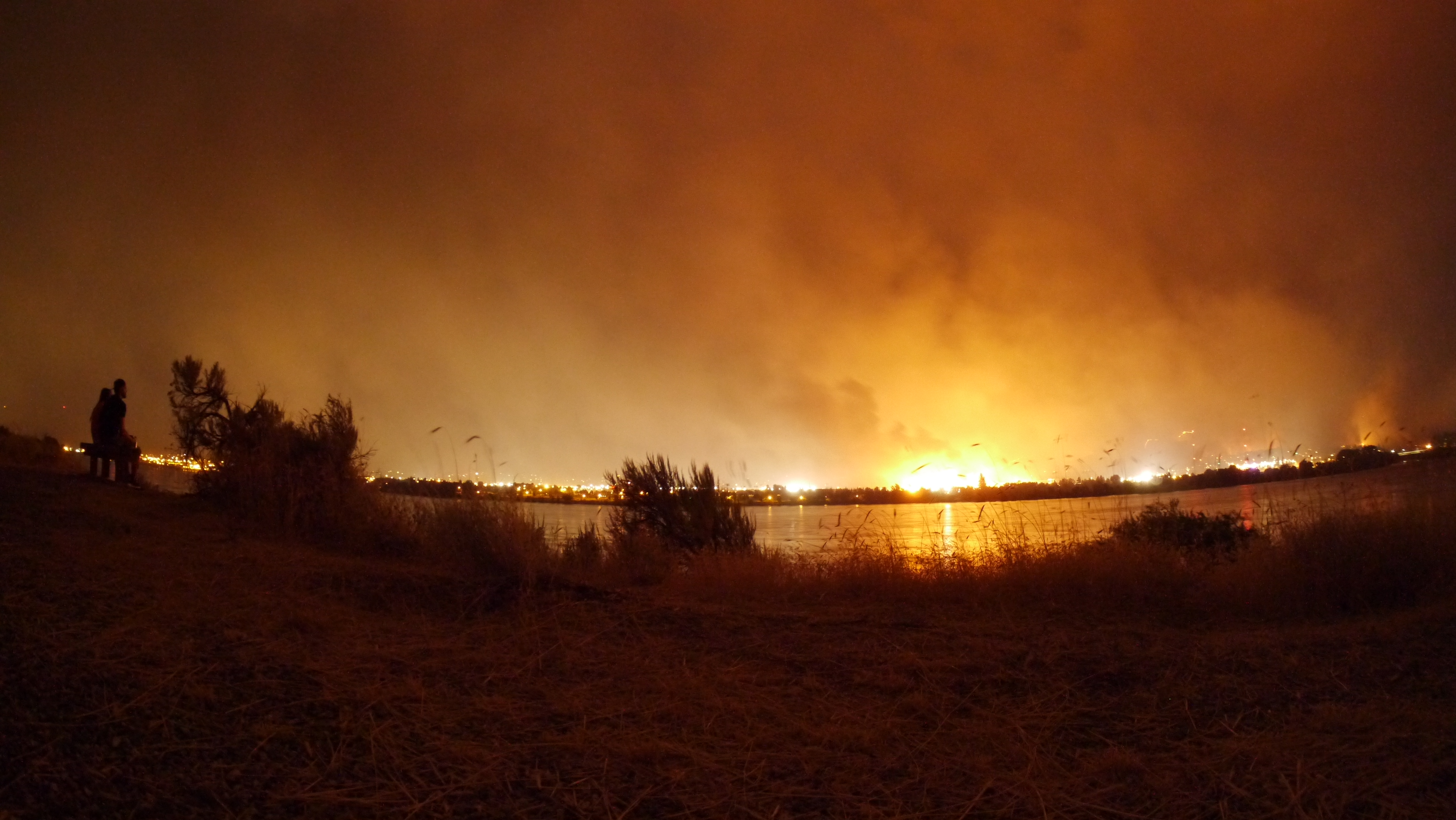
A wildfire in 2015 destroyed 29 homes in Wenatchee as well as fruit warehouses and a recycling center.

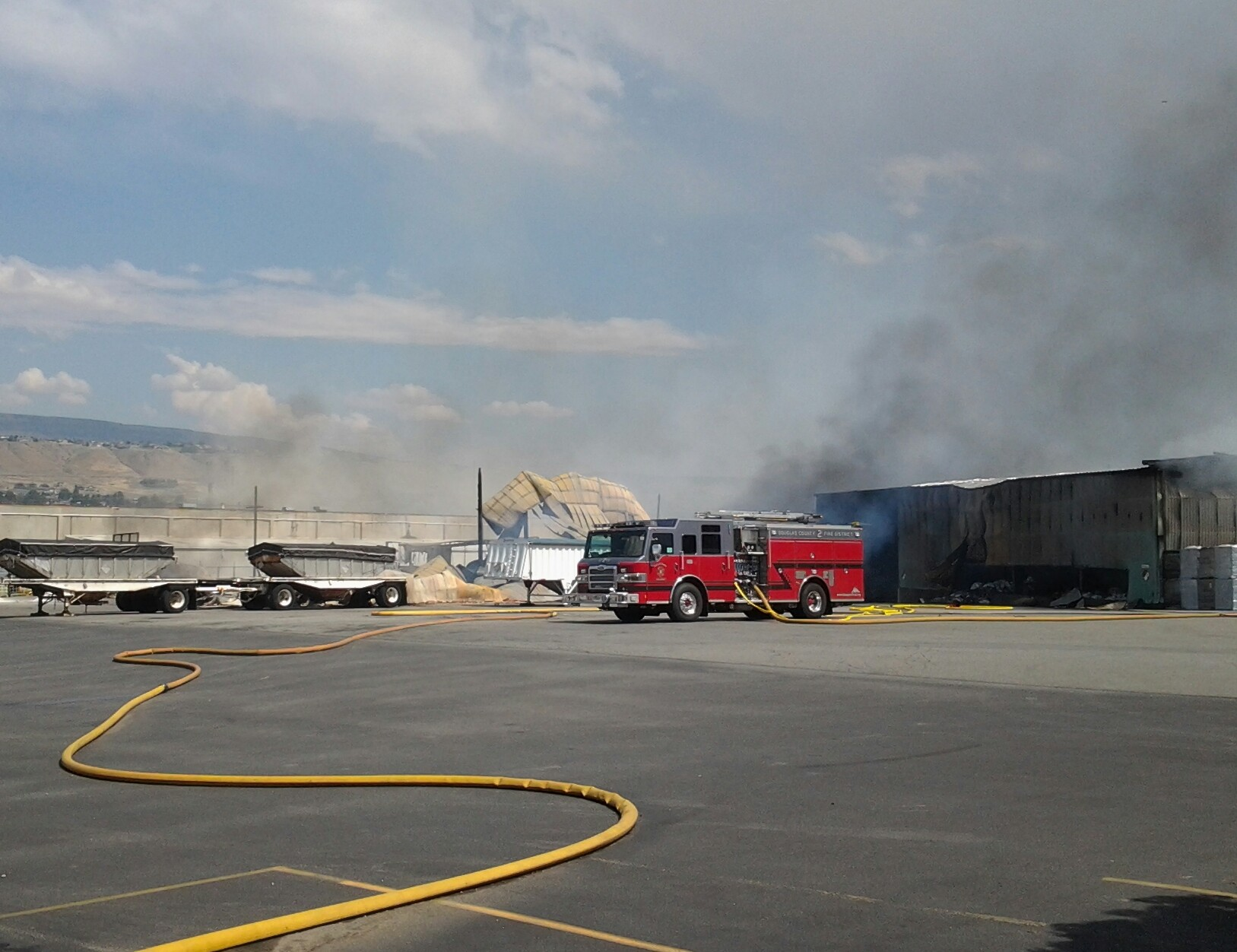
Mop up on a fruit warehouse fire that started at a recycling center from burning embers from a nearby wildfire- the Sleepy Hollow Fire.

The season began unprecedentedly early with the Sleepy Hollow Fire on June 28, affecting the city of Wenatchee in Chelan County, Washington. It burned 2,950 acres, destroying 29 homes and several commercial buildings. The cause of the fire is under investigation but is "likely human-caused". Officials said the fire's unusual intensity was caused by drought and record high temperatures. As a safety precaution, officials banned Fourth of July fireworks in many parts of the state. A man was arrested in connection with the fire, confessing to starting it with a disposable lighter, but faced no charges due to his mental illness.

=== July ===
By July 12, over 16,000 acres had burned, including a single fire near Ephrata, in Grant County, that had burned at least 10,000 acres. Later in the month, another major fire was triggered by farm equipment near Walla Walla and burned more than 6,000 acres over two weeks.

=== August ===
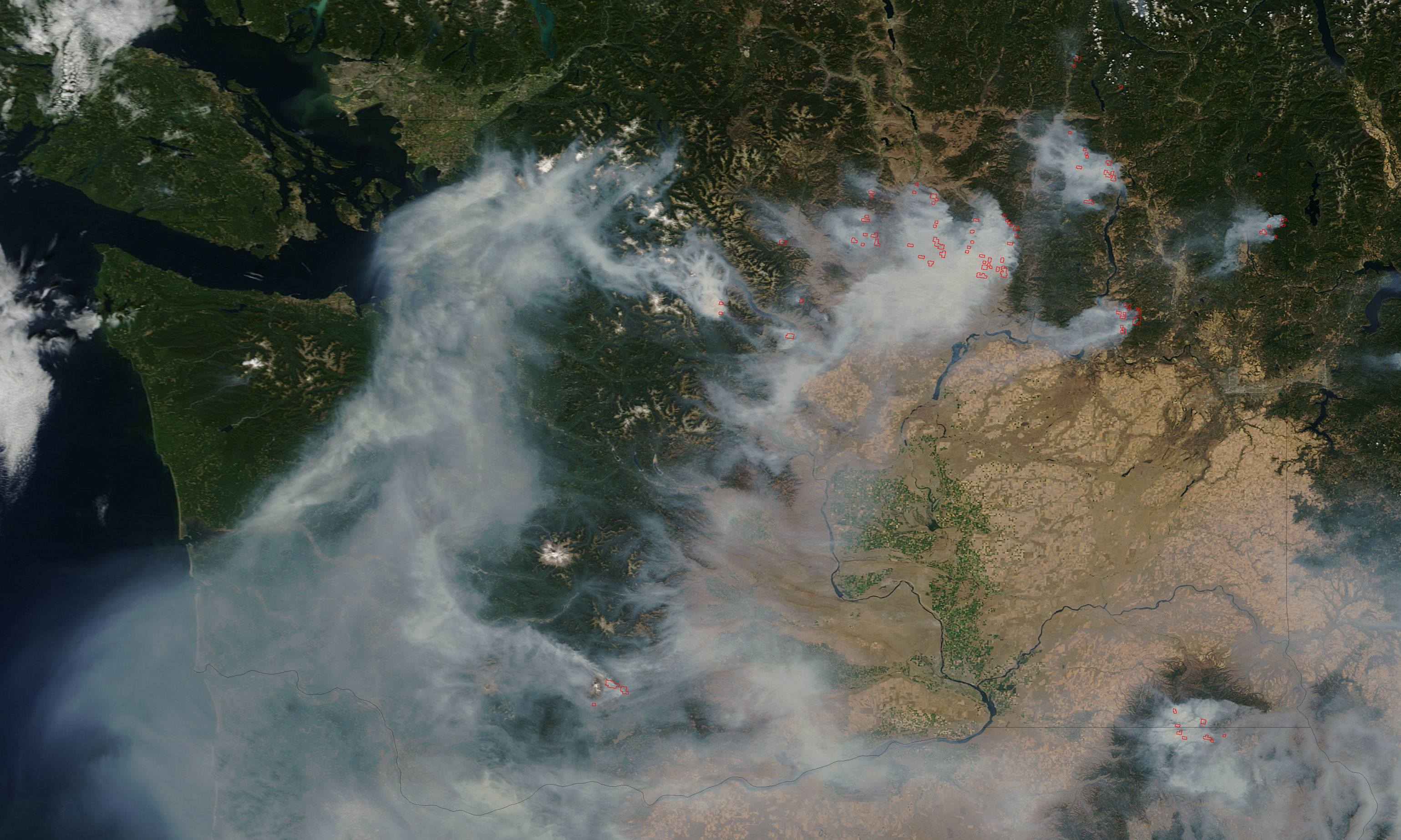
MODIS aerial imagery of Washington on August 22, showing the Puget Sound region covered in smoke from wildfires in Eastern Washington.

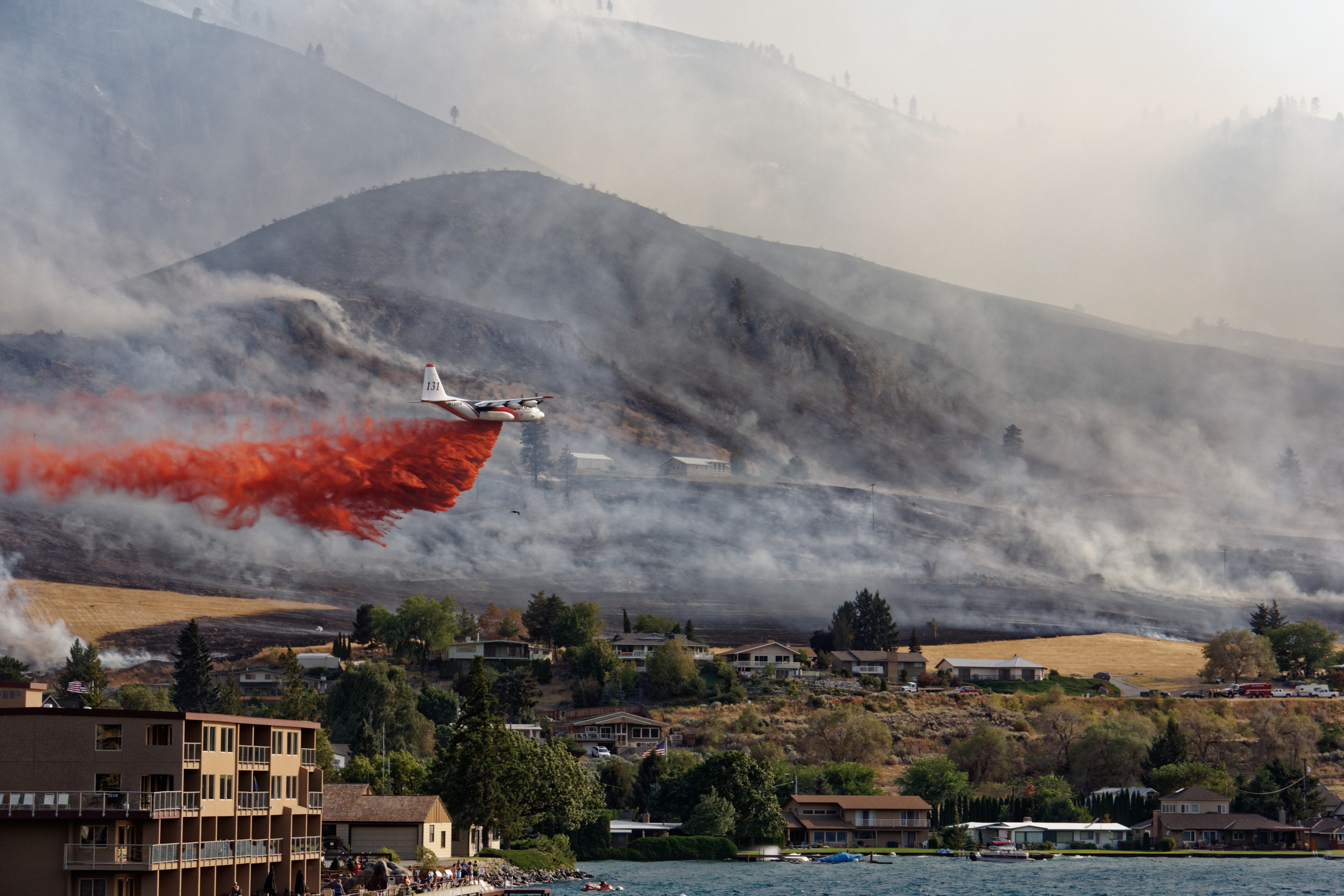
An airtanker plane dropping fire retardant over the advancing Chelan Butte wildfire (part of the Chelan Complex fire)

The extent of wildfires in August 2015 led to the federal declaration of a state of emergency in Washington state by President Barack Obama on August 21, 2015.

By August 24, over 16 active fires had burned more than 920 square miles (2,400 km^{2}).

On August 29 there was concern that unusually strong southerly winds would cause "significant growth" of the Tunk Block and Lime Belt fires in the Okanogan complex and growth in the Chelan complex fires. The Twisp River and Nine Mile fires were about 95 percent contained.

==== Chelan Complex ====
Three fires on the south end of Lake Chelan, near the city of Chelan, merged into a complex fire and forced the immediate evacuation of over 1,000 residents on August 14. By August 16, the Reach Complex Fire had grown to 54,500 acres (22,100 ha), while the Wolverine fire burned nearly 39,000 acres (16,000 ha). According to Rico Smith, a spokesman for the firefighters near Chelan, by August 29 "about 85 homes, businesses and other residences [had] been destroyed by the Chelan complex fires."

==== Okanogan Complex ====
The Okanogan Complex Fire was formed from five separate wildfires in Okanogan County, of which all but one were caused by lightning strikes, burning approximately 96,034 acres (38,864 ha) by August 20. The Federal Emergency Management Agency (FEMA) authorized the use of federal grants on August 14 for the Nine Mile Fire, one of the five fires that are part of the Okanogan Complex, determining that it constituted a "major disaster". Over 1,300 residents in the towns of Twisp and Winthrop were ordered to evacuate because of the approaching Twisp River Fire. On August 19, 2015, three firefighters were killed battling a wildfire near Twisp.

By August 24, the fire had grown to 256,657 acres (103,865 ha), surpassing the Carlton Complex fire of 2014 to become the largest wildfire complex in Washington state history. By August 28 "at least 45 primary residences, 49 cabins and 60 outbuildings [were] destroyed in the Okanogan complex fires." The size of the complex peaked at 304,782 acres (123,341 ha) on August 30, before the transfer of the 161,440-acre (65,330 ha) Tunk Block Fire under the North Star Fire on August 31.

== International assistance ==
After the emergency declaration in August, President Obama asked Australian Fire Services (including those of the Black Saturday bushfires) to aid the depleted American services. By August 24, about 70 fire managers from Australia and New Zealand arrived at the National Interagency Fire Center in Boise, Idaho, to be briefed and provided with gear before heading west to fight the fires.

== Air quality ==
As a result of the wildfires, air quality across the state and into Canada dropped to unhealthy levels in many cities and led to the issuing of several air quality alerts by the U.S. National Weather Service and Environment Canada. Omak, located 15 miles (24 km) northeast of the Okanogan Complex fire, reported an air quality index rating of 500 on August 24. The city of Spokane, 150 miles (240 km) from the fires, reported a rating of 188 on August 24, forcing high school athletics and other outdoor activities to be canceled. By Tuesday, August 25, Environment Canada had posted an Air Quality Health Index alert for cities as far away as Calgary, Alberta—400 miles (640 km)—with a score of 12. The Canadian Air Quality Health Index, measured on a scale of one to 10-plus with 10 as "very high risk", is based on measurements of "ozone at ground level, particulate matter and nitrogen dioxide". By Wednesday the third day of the thick haze of smoke, air quality in Calgary scored 17.

Smoke from the Chelan Complex fire was pushed westward over Seattle and the Puget Sound region by upper-level winds on August 22, causing hazy weather and worsened air quality for several days.

== Aftermath ==
In December, Governor Jay Inslee proposed a supplemental budget that included $178 million to cover the costs incurred by the state in fighting the wildfires.

== List of fires ==
As of August 28, 2015

Name	Location	Area burned (Note: At greatest extent.)		Dates		Cause	Notes
Name	Location	Acres	Hectares	Began/Reported	Ended (If know) (Note: Indicates date the fire was declared 100% contained.)	Cause	Notes
231 fire	Spokane Indian Reservation and Stevens County	1,138	461	July 3, 2015	July 12, 2015	Under investigation	
Alder Lake fire	Gifford Pinchot National Forest	253	102	July 26, 2015		Lightning	
Blankenship fire	Okanogan and Wenatchee national forests	180	73	July 14, 2015			
Blue Creek fire	Walla Walla County	6,004	2,430	July 20, 2015		Under investigation	
Carpenter Road fire	Spokane Indian Reservation and Stevens County	46,691	18,895	August 12, 2015		Unknown	
Chelan Complex	Chelan County	90,210	36,510	August 14, 2015			Complex of 5 fires
Colville Complex	Ferry and Stevens counties	9,879	3,998	August 14, 2015			Complex of 3 fires
Cougar Creek	Yakama Indian Reservation and Gifford Pinchot National Forest	49,200	19,900	August 10, 2015		Lightning	
Douglas County Complex	Douglas County	22,337	9,039	July 10, 2015	July 15, 2015	Lightning	Complex of 2 fires
Grizzly Bear Complex	Umatilla National Forest	72,421	29,308	August 13, 2015		Lightning	Complex of 17 fires; includes portion in Oregon
Highway 8 fire	Klickitat County	33,100	13,400	August 4, 2015		Unknown	
Kaniksu Complex	Colville National Forest and Pend Oreille County	16,335	6,611	August 11, 2015		Lightning	Complex of 7 fires
Kettle Complex	Ferry County	62,292	25,209	August 11, 2015		Lightning	Complex of 3 fires (Stickpin, Renner, Graves Mountain)
Marble Valley	Stevens County	3,087	1,249	August 14, 2015		Unknown	
Mount Adams Complex	Gifford Pinchot National Forest	405	164	July 10, 2015		Unknown	Complex of 4 fires
Newby Lake fire	Okanogan and Wenatchee national forests	5,065	2,050	July 2, 2015		Lightning	Includes portion in British Columbia
North Boulder 2	Ferry County	233	94	July 20, 2015		Lightning	
North Star	Colville Indian Reservation, Colville National Forest, and Okanogan and Ferry counties	192,900	78,100	August 13, 2015		Human	
Okanogan Complex	Okanogan County	302,224	122,306	August 15, 2015		Lightning	Complex of 5 fires; second-largest in Washington state history Includes portion in British Columbia
Paradise Fire	Olympic National Park	2,796	1,132	May 15, 2015		Lightning	
PC Complex	Clark and Cowlitz counties	129	52	July 16, 2015	July 24, 2015	Human	Complex of 5 fires
Saddle Lakes fire	Saddle Mountain National Wildlife Refuge	14,357	5,810	June 28, 2015	July 16, 2015	Lightning	
Sleepy Hollow fire	Chelan County	2,950	1,190	June 28, 2015	July 6, 2015	Human	
Thunder Creek	North Cascades National Park	103	42	May 30, 2015		Lightning	
Twenty-One Mile Grade	Colville Indian Reservation	2,250	910	July 1, 2015	July 10, 2015	Human	
Upper Skagit Complex	North Cascades National Park	7,878	3,188	August 10, 2015		Lightning	Complex of 8 fires
Williams fire	Stevens County	332	134	July 3, 2015	July 10, 2015	Under investigation	
Wolverine fire	Wenatchee National Forest	62,167	25,158	June 29, 2015		Lightning	Part of Chelan Complex

== See also ==
- 2015 California wildfires
- 2015 Oregon wildfires
- List of Washington wildfires
