= Ruby, Washington =

Ghost town in Washington (state)

- Ghost town
- Location within Washington (state) Location within the United States
- Coordinates: 48°29′57″N 119°43′32″W
- Country: United States
- State: Washington
- County: Okanogan
- Time zone: UTC-8 (Pacific (PST))
  - Summer (DST): UTC-7 (PDT)

Ruby is an American ghost town in Okanogan County, Washington State.

Silver was discovered in 1886 on the slopes of Ruby Mountain and Peacock Hill. By 1887 a mining district was created and a camp grew up beside Salmon Creek. This camp was called Ruby, or Ruby City.

Ruby had a population of about 700. By 1888, 70 buildings were located along the main street. In 1888, Ruby was briefly declared the county seat for about eleven months. A publication called the Ruby Miner advertised the mineral richness of the area. When the Panic of 1893 caused silver prices to plummet, Ruby was slowly abandoned, eventually becoming a ghost town.
