= Pateros High School =

Location
- 344 West Beach Street; Pateros, Washington 98846; United States
- Coordinates: 48°3′7″N 119°54′23″W

Information
- Type: Public
- Principal: Laura Christian
- Teaching staff: 8.40 (FTE)
- Grades: 7-12
- Enrollment: 110 (2023–2024)
- Student to teacher ratio: 13.10
- Colors: Purple & Gold
- Team name: Billygoats, Nannies
- Information: (509) 923-2343
- Website: www.pateros.org

Pateros High School (grades 9–12) is the only secondary school in the small town of Pateros, Washington. Pateros High School is part of the Pateros School District, one of only three K-12 schools in the United States to have been selected as a National Blue Ribbon Award Winning School.

== Sports ==
Between 1991 and 1995, the Pateros Billygoats played in the B-8 State Football Championship Game 4 times, achieving 1st place in 1995. During the same school year that Pateros became State Football Champions, the Boys Basketball team defeated St. George's High School 77–51, becoming B State Basketball Champions.

In 1978, Terry Ellis of Pateros High School won the high jump at Class A State Track meet with a mark of 7 feet, 2.25 inches. This remains a Washington State Meet track and field record in 2014.
