= Washington State Route 153 =

State highway in Okanogan County, Washington, US

State Route 153
- Methow Valley Highway
- SR 153 highlighted in red

Route information
- Auxiliary route of US 97
- Maintained by WSDOT
- Length: 30.78 mi (49.54 km)
- Existed: 1964–present
- Tourist routes: Cascade Loop Scenic Byway

Major junctions
- South end: US 97 in Pateros
- North end: SR 20 near Twisp

Location
- Country: United States
- State: Washington
- Counties: Okanogan

Highway system
- State highways in Washington; Interstate; US; State; Scenic; Pre-1964; 1964 renumbering; Former
← SR 150	→ SR 155

State Route 153 (SR 153, named the Methow Valley Highway) is a 30.78-mile (49.54 km) long state highway in the U.S. state of Washington, serving as part of the Cascade Loop in Okanogan County. The Methow Valley Highway begins at an intersection with U.S. Route 97 (US 97) in Pateros at the confluence of the Methow River and the Columbia River. SR 153 travels northwest, parallel to the Methow River, to end at SR 20 south of Twisp. The highway was first established in 1897 as the Methow-Barron Road and was designated as various highways, including State Road 12 from 1905 to 1919, the Roosevelt Highway from 1919 to 1923, and Primary State Highway 16 (PSH 16) until the 1964 highway renumbering, when it became SR 153.

== Route description ==
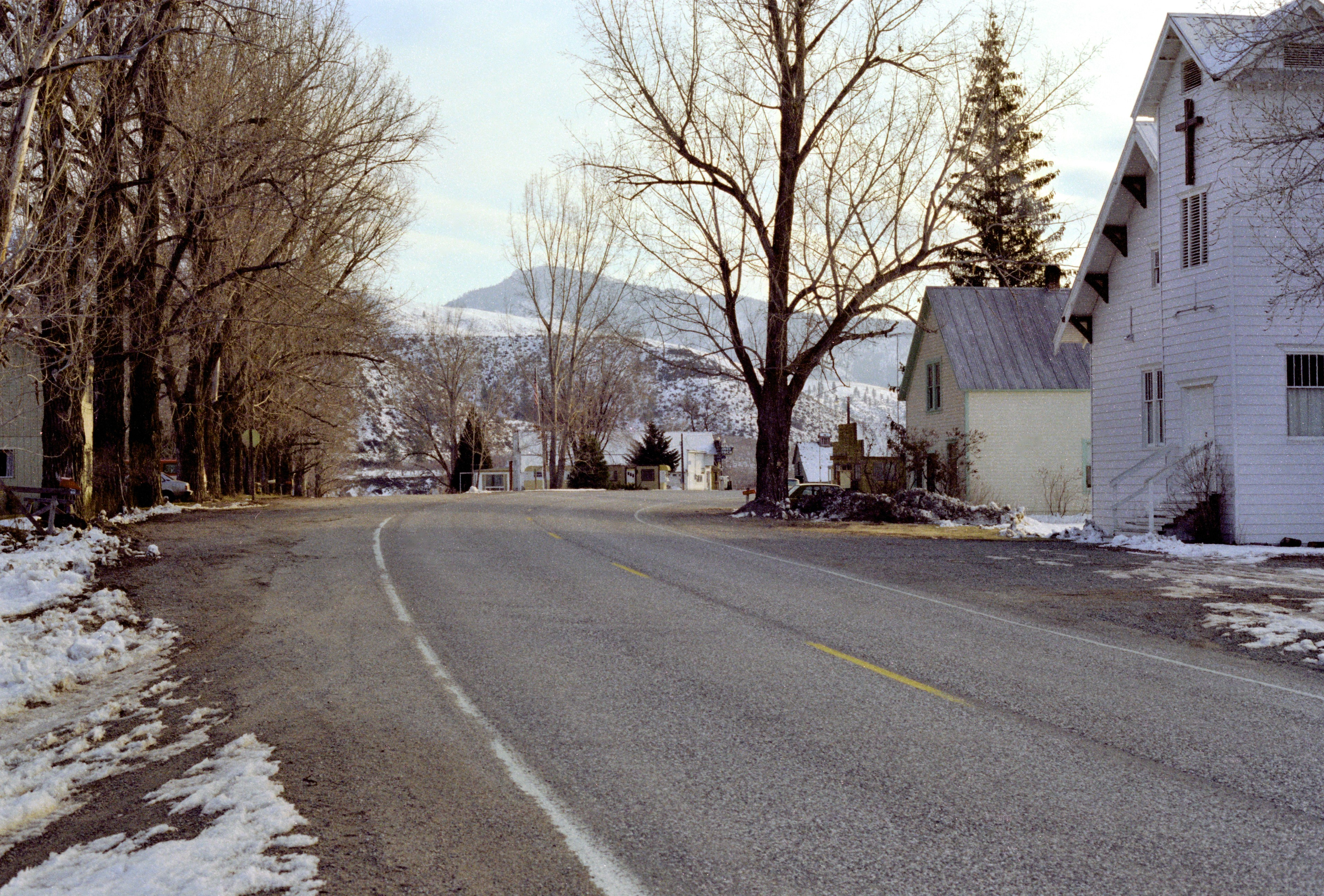
Looking southbound on SR 153 in Methow

SR 153, part of the Cascade Loop, begins at an intersection with US 97 south of the confluence of the Methow River into the Columbia River in Pateros. The highway dips south before leaving Pateros into farmland and serving Alta Lake State Park to the south near the Chelan National Forest. SR 153 crosses the Methow River twice heading west towards the Sawtooth Ridge and turns north to the communities of Methow and Carlton. The highway continues northwest, ending at an intersection with SR 20 southeast of Twisp and Twisp Municipal Airport.

Every year the Washington State Department of Transportation (WSDOT) conducts a series of surveys on its highways in the state to measure traffic volume. This is expressed in terms of annual average daily traffic (AADT), which is a measure of traffic volume for any average day of the year. In 2011, WSDOT calculated that between 1,400 and 2,500 vehicles per day used the highway, mostly at the northern terminus near Twisp.

== History ==
SR 153 follows the route of the unpaved Methow-Barron Road, which was established in 1897 and later became State Road 12 in 1905. State Route 12 was named as part of the Roosevelt Highway in 1919 and became the secondary Methow Valley Highway in 1923. The Methow Valley Highway was later made into a primary state highway in 1925 and became Primary State Highway 16 (PSH 16) during the creation of the Primary and secondary state highways in 1937. PSH 16 was extended westward and became the North Cross State Highway in 1961, before the establishment of SR 153 during the 1964 highway renumbering.

== Major intersections ==
The entire highway is in Okanogan County.

Location	mi	km	Destinations	Notes
Pateros	0.00	0.00	US 97 – Okanogan, Chelan, Wenatchee	Southern terminus
	30.78	49.54	SR 20 – Twisp, Burlington, Okanogan	Northern terminus
1.000 mi = 1.609 km; 1.000 km = 0.621 mi
