= Carlton, Washington =

Unincorporated community in Washington, United States

- Unincorporated community
- Location within Washington (state)
- Coordinates: 48°14′54″N 120°06′58″W
- Country: United States
- State: Washington
- County: Okanogan
- Elevation: 1,414 ft (431 m)
- Time zone: UTC-8 (Pacific (PST))
  - Summer (DST): UTC-7 (PDT)
- ZIP code: 98814
- Area code: 509
- GNIS feature ID: 1517403

Carlton is an unincorporated community in Okanogan County, Washington State, United States on the Methow River and Washington State Route 153, 8 miles (13 km) south of Twisp. Carlton has a post office with ZIP code 98814.

== See also ==
- Carlton Complex Fire
