= Malott, Washington =

Human settlement in Washington, United States

- Unincorporated Community
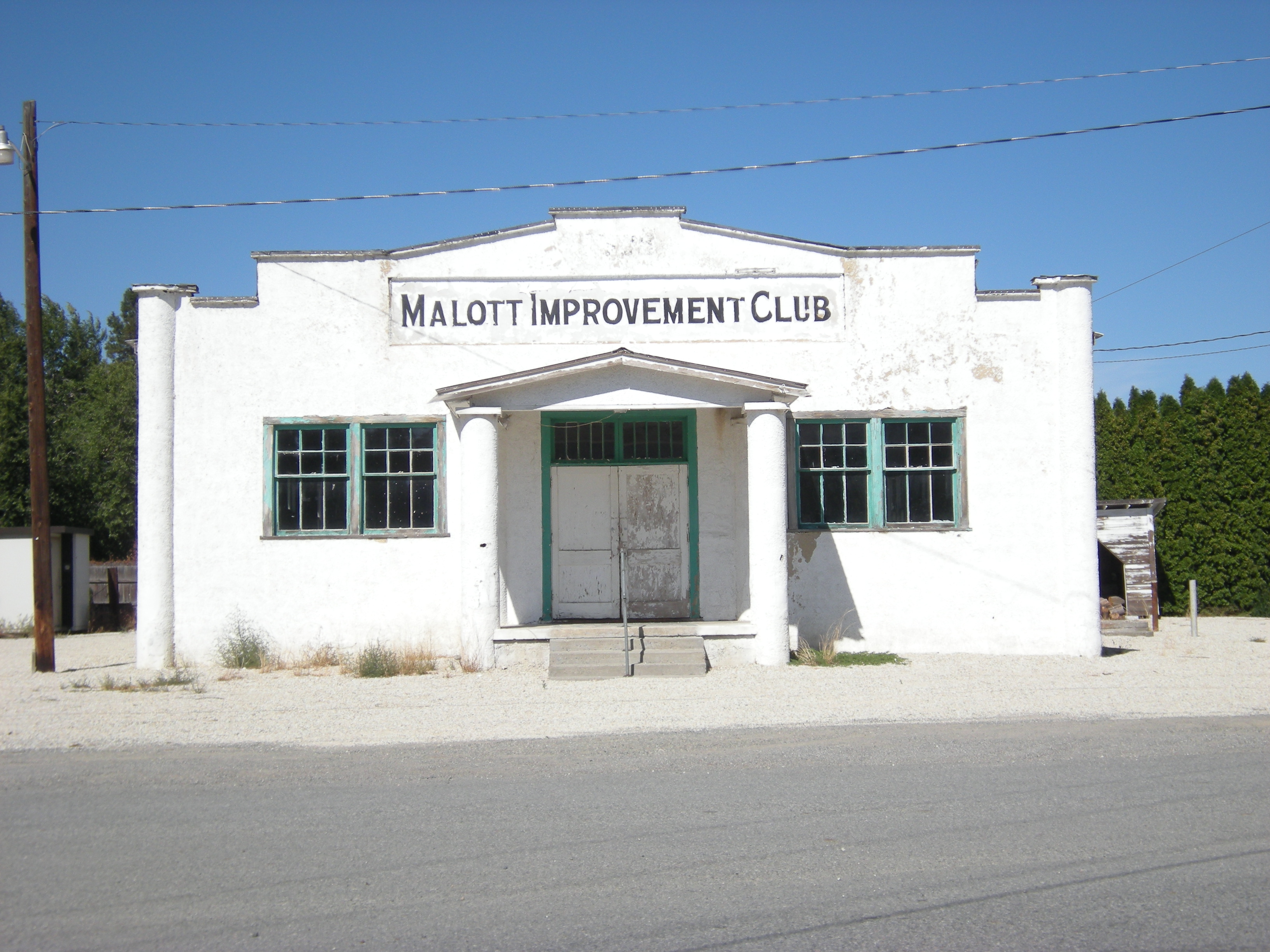
- The Malott Improvement Club in 2008
- Interactive map of Malott, Washington
- Coordinates: 48°17′31″N 119°41′44″W
- Country: United States
- State: Washington
- County: Okanogan
- Named for: L.C. Malott
- Elevation: 837 ft (255 m)
- Time zone: UTC-8 (PST)
  - Summer (DST): UTC-7 (PDT)
- ZIP Code: 98829, 98840
- Area Code: 509
- GNIS feature ID: 2586738

Malott is a census-designated place (CDP) in Okanogan County, Washington, United States, within the Greater Omak Area. As of the 2020 census, Malott had a population of 464.

Malott sits on the western bank of the Okanogan River and has bridge access to U.S. Route 97. It has a general store, bar and church. The community took its name from L.C. Malott, who first settled in the area in 1886. The town was established in 1890 and platted in 1909. Originally a stopover point with a hotel, most of the town was destroyed by flooding in 1938 after a dam burst on Loop Loop Creek. Malott was evacuated in July 2014 due to the approaching Carlton Complex wildfires.

The city of Okanogan lies 9 miles (14 km) to the northeast.

== Climate ==
This climatic region is typified by large seasonal temperature differences, with warm to hot (often humid) summers and cold (sometimes severely cold) winters. According to the Köppen climate classification system, Malott has a humid continental climate, abbreviated "Dsb" on climate maps.

Climate data for Malott
Month	Jan	Feb	Mar	Apr	May	Jun	Jul	Aug	Sep	Oct	Nov	Dec	Year
Record high °F (°C)	61 (16)	61 (16)	68 (20)	89 (32)	98 (37)	101 (38)	107 (42)	103 (39)	101 (38)	85 (29)	63 (17)	61 (16)	107 (42)
Mean daily maximum °F (°C)	30.3 (−0.9)	37.1 (2.8)	50.7 (10.4)	63.6 (17.6)	73.7 (23.2)	81.1 (27.3)	91.2 (32.9)	88.1 (31.2)	80 (27)	63.5 (17.5)	43 (6)	36 (2)	61.5 (16.4)
Mean daily minimum °F (°C)	15.8 (−9.0)	17.7 (−7.9)	26.6 (−3.0)	34 (1)	42.9 (6.1)	47.9 (8.8)	51.7 (10.9)	51 (11)	42.3 (5.7)	33.6 (0.9)	26.3 (−3.2)	20.5 (−6.4)	34.2 (1.2)
Record low °F (°C)	−20 (−29)	−22 (−30)	0 (−18)	17 (−8)	21 (−6)	32 (0)	36 (2)	37 (3)	29 (−2)	18 (−8)	−4 (−20)	−8 (−22)	−22 (−30)
Average precipitation inches (mm)	2.06 (52)	0.93 (24)	1.04 (26)	1.02 (26)	0.95 (24)	1.64 (42)	0.43 (11)	0.78 (20)	0.27 (6.9)	1.44 (37)	1.36 (35)	1.51 (38)	13.43 (341)
Average snowfall inches (cm)	17.6 (45)	4.7 (12)	0 (0)	1 (2.5)	0 (0)	0 (0)	0 (0)	0 (0)	0 (0)	0 (0)	4.3 (11)	9.1 (23)	36.7 (93)
Average precipitation days	9	3	4	3	6	5	2	3	1	5	7	7	55

== Demographics ==
Historical population
Census	Pop.	Note	%±
2010	487		—
2020	464		−4.7%
U.S. Decennial Census; 2000 2010

Malott first appeared as a census designated place in the 2010 U.S. census.

=== Racial and ethnic composition ===
Malott CDP, Washington – Racial and ethnic composition Note: the US Census treats Hispanic/Latino as an ethnic category. This table excludes Latinos from the racial categories and assigns them to a separate category. Hispanics/Latinos may be of any race.
Race / Ethnicity (NH = Non-Hispanic)	Pop 2010	Pop 2020	% 2010	% 2020
White alone (NH)	368	282	75.56%	60.78%
Black or African American alone (NH)	0	0	0.00%	0.00%
Native American or Alaska Native alone (NH)	25	18	5.13%	3.88%
Asian alone (NH)	1	0	0.21%	0.00%
Native Hawaiian or Pacific Islander alone (NH)	0	1	0.00%	0.22%
Other race alone (NH)	0	1	0.00%	0.22%
Mixed race or Multiracial (NH)	5	14	1.03%	3.02%
Hispanic or Latino (any race)	88	148	18.07%	31.90%
Total	487	464	100.00%	100.00%

== Education ==
The area is served by the Okanogan School District.
