= French Creek (Snohomish River tributary) =

Stream in Washington, U.S.

Coordinates: 47°53′17″N 122°05′15″W

French Creek is a stream in the U.S. state of Washington. It is a tributary of Snohomish River.

A share of the early settlers being of French Canadian descent caused the name to be selected.

Another French Creek is located within the Okanogan-Wenatchee National Forest, and is home to wilderness hiking trails.

== See also ==
- List of rivers of Washington (state)
