= Okanogan Conservation District =

The Okanogan Conservation District is a sub-division of Washington state government formed under Chapter 89.08 of the Revised Code of Washington. Conservation districts in Washington State are tasked with developing programs to voluntarily assist landowners and others with conserving all natural resources. Conservation Districts are governed by five volunteer supervisors, three of whom must be directly involved in farmer, ranching, or other natural resource industry.

The Okanogan Conservation District is bound by the Canada–U.S. border to the north, the crest of the Cascade Mountains to the west, the Columbia River to the south, and Okanogan-Ferry County boundary line to the east.

Conservation Districts in Washington are primarily grant funded. Each District must secure funding to implement the conservation program that is established by the Board of Supervisors.

== History ==
The Okanogan Conservation District was started by a group of farmers and ranchers in 1940. The District at the time was centered upon the small community of Loomis. Over the next 15 years several other small conservation districts were started in Okanogan County and they operated separately for another dozen years. Beginning in 1958, some of these districts began combining to increase efficiency and improve delivery of programs. Finally in 1976 the last three remaining districts combined to form the exterior boundaries of the current District.
