= Methow, Washington =

Unincorporated community in Washington, United States

- Unincorporated
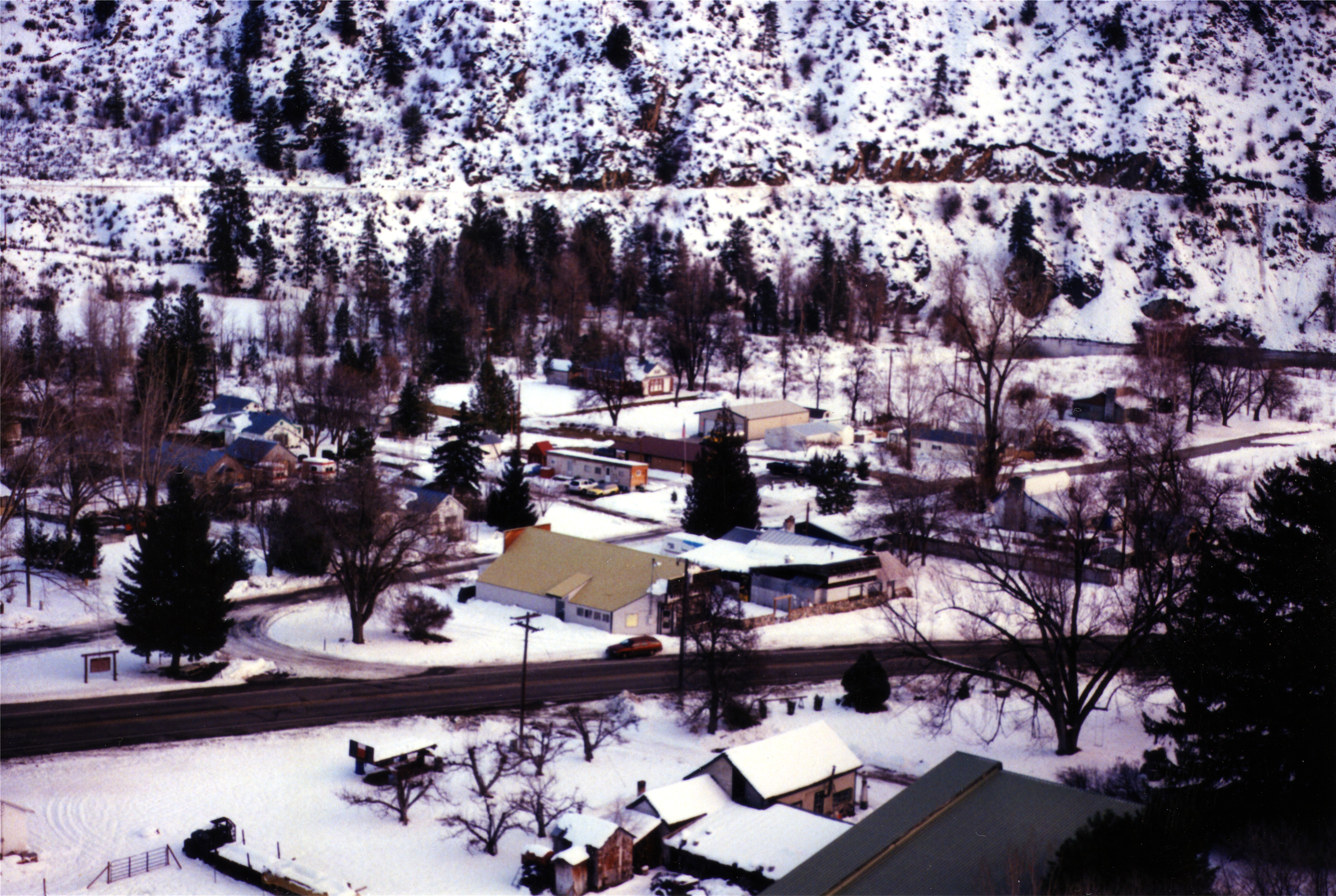
- Methow, Washington
- Interactive map of Methow, Washington
- Coordinates: 48°07′36″N 120°00′15″W
- Country: United States
- State: Washington
- County: Okanogan
- Elevation: 1,148 ft (350 m)

Population (2020)
  - Total: 246
- ZIP Code 98834
- Time zone: UTC-8 (Pacific (PST))
  - Summer (DST): UTC-7 (PDT)
- ZIP code: 98834
- Area code: 509
- FIPS code: 53-53720
- GNIS feature ID: 2586740

Methow (/ˈmɛthaʊ/ MET-how), is an unincorporated community in Okanogan County, Washington, United States. The community had a population of 246 at the 2020 census.

== History ==
Methow was founded in 1899 by W.A. Bolinger when he moved his store from the former mining boom-town at Squaw Creek (approx. 4 miles south). It is named after the Methow people, an Interior Salish people who lived in the area. The name "Methow" itself comes from the Okanogan placename /mətxʷú/, meaning "sunflower (seeds)". The unincorporated community has its own community center, post office, fire station, church, water system, and two parks. The Methow Store, originally built by W.A. Bolinger, was closed for decades, but reopened in 2024. The town's restaurant is currently closed. The town is one of the principal starting points for rafting along the Methow River.

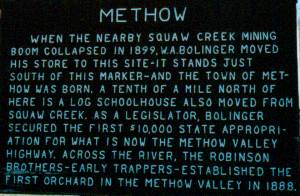
Historical Marker in Methow, Washington

The original Methow Store can be seen just off Washington State Route 153. Directly across the street sits a large historic stone house and homestead that the Bolinger family built. This small town is also home to two old single-room schoolhouses. One of these schoolhouses sits just north of the Methow Store. The other schoolhouse is now used as a community center. The Methow Church was formed over a century ago. Methow's population has stayed consistent for the past several decades at about two hundred fifty people. The population of the surrounding area, the Methow Valley, has grown significantly over the past two decades.

== Geography ==
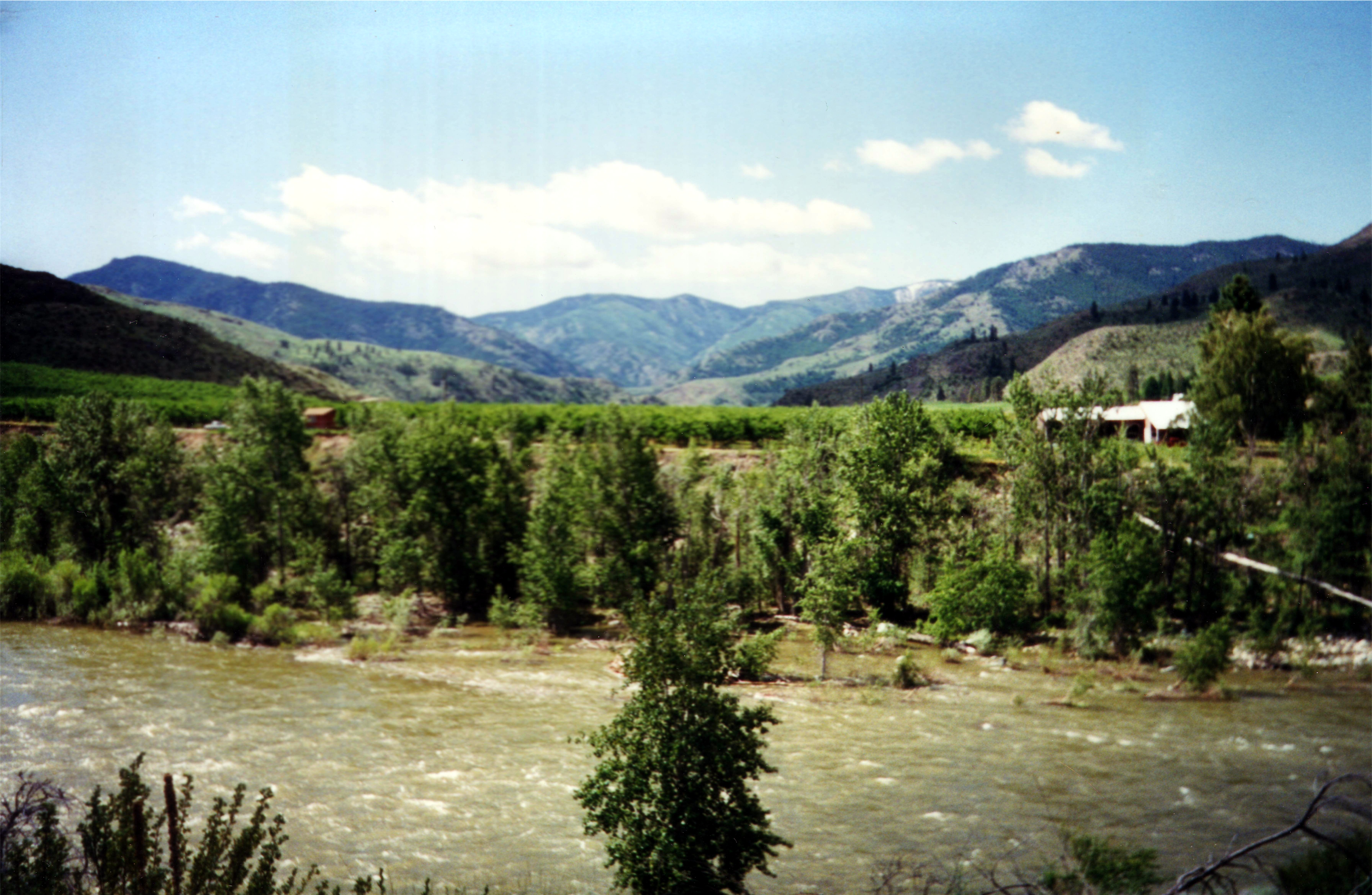
Southern view from Methow, Washington

Methow is located on the Methow River 13 miles (21 km) upriver from the confluence of the Methow and Columbia rivers in Okanogan County, Washington. It sits at an elevation of 1,156 feet above sea level in the foothills of the Cascade Range.

=== Climate ===
This climatic region is typified by large seasonal temperature differences, with warm to hot (and often humid) summers and cold (sometimes severely cold) winters. According to the Köppen Climate Classification system, Methow has a dry-summer humid continental climate, abbreviated "Dsb" on climate maps.

Climate data for Methow
Month	Jan	Feb	Mar	Apr	May	Jun	Jul	Aug	Sep	Oct	Nov	Dec	Year
Record high °F (°C)	57 (14)	69 (21)	76 (24)	87 (31)	100 (38)	105 (41)	107 (42)	105 (41)	102 (39)	88 (31)	72 (22)	53 (12)	107 (42)
Mean daily maximum °F (°C)	29.1 (−1.6)	39.4 (4.1)	50.5 (10.3)	62 (17)	72.3 (22.4)	81.5 (27.5)	89.1 (31.7)	88 (31)	79 (26)	61.3 (16.3)	42.9 (6.1)	31.3 (−0.4)	60.5 (15.8)
Mean daily minimum °F (°C)	14.7 (−9.6)	22.3 (−5.4)	26.7 (−2.9)	33.9 (1.1)	41.5 (5.3)	49.4 (9.7)	53.3 (11.8)	52.3 (11.3)	44.6 (7.0)	34.2 (1.2)	26.3 (−3.2)	19.4 (−7.0)	34.9 (1.6)
Record low °F (°C)	−20 (−29)	−15 (−26)	0 (−18)	21 (−6)	25 (−4)	33 (1)	35 (2)	35 (2)	24 (−4)	2 (−17)	−17 (−27)	−21 (−29)	−21 (−29)
Average precipitation inches (mm)	1.48 (38)	1.27 (32)	1.23 (31)	0.75 (19)	1.17 (30)	0.84 (21)	0.51 (13)	0.52 (13)	0.54 (14)	0.75 (19)	1.71 (43)	1.93 (49)	12.7 (320)
Average snowfall inches (cm)	14.5 (37)	2.9 (7.4)	1.5 (3.8)	0.2 (0.51)	0 (0)	0 (0)	0 (0)	0 (0)	0 (0)	0 (0)	3.8 (9.7)	17.5 (44)	40.4 (103)
Average precipitation days	6	5	6	4	6	5	3	3	3	4	7	8	60

== Demographics ==
Historical population
Census	Pop.	Note	%±
2010	68		—
2020	92		35.3%
U.S. Decennial Census; 1970 1980 1990; 2000 2010

Methow first appeared as a census designated place in the 2010 U.S. census.

=== Racial and ethnic composition ===
Methow CDP, Washington – Racial and ethnic composition Note: the US Census treats Hispanic/Latino as an ethnic category. This table excludes Latinos from the racial categories and assigns them to a separate category. Hispanics/Latinos may be of any race.
Race / Ethnicity (NH = Non-Hispanic)	Pop 2010	Pop 2020	% 2010	% 2020
White alone (NH)	67	65	98.53%	70.65%
Black or African American alone (NH)	0	0	0.00%	0.00%
Native American or Alaska Native alone (NH)	0	3	0.00%	3.26%
Asian alone (NH)	0	1	0.00%	1.09%
Native Hawaiian or Pacific Islander alone (NH)	0	1	0.00%	1.09%
Other race alone (NH)	0	9	0.00%	9.78%
Mixed race or Multiracial (NH)	0	3	0.00%	3.26%
Hispanic or Latino (any race)	1	10	1.47%	10.87%
Total	68	92	100.00%	100.00%

== Education ==
The area is served by the Pateros School District.
