= Okanogan County, Washington =

County in Washington, United States

- County
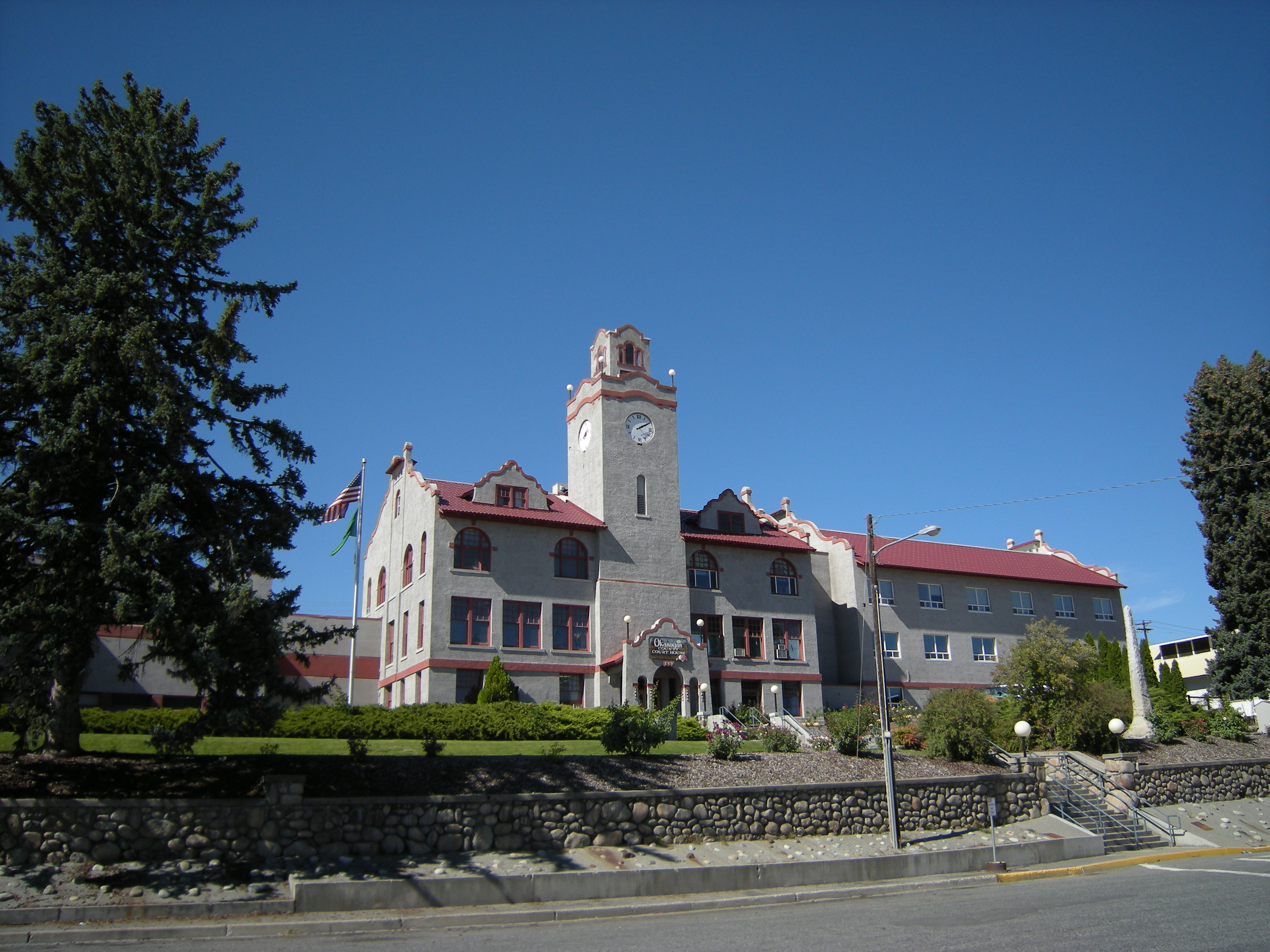
- Okanogan County Courthouse in Okanogan

- Seal

- Location within the U.S. state of Washington
- Coordinates: 48°32′54″N 119°44′32″W
- Country: United States
- State: Washington
- Founded: February 2, 1888
- Named for: Fort Okanogan
- Seat: Okanogan
- Largest city: Omak

Area
  - Total: 5,312.7 sq mi (13,760 km^{2})
  - Land: 5,266.2 sq mi (13,639 km^{2})
  - Water: 46.5 sq mi (120 km^{2}) 0.9%

Population (2020)
  - Total: 42,104
  - Estimate (2025): 45,230 ▲
  - Density: 8.3/sq mi (3.2/km^{2})
- Time zone: UTC−8 (Pacific)
  - Summer (DST): UTC−7 (PDT)
- Congressional district: 4th
- Website: www.okanogancounty.gov

Okanogan County (/ˌoʊkəˈnɑːɡən/) is a county located in the U.S. state of Washington along the Canada–U.S. border. As of the 2020 census, the population was 42,104. The county seat is Okanogan, while the most populous city is Omak. It is the largest county by area in the state.

About a fifth of the county's residents live in the Greater Omak Area. The county forms a portion of the Okanogan Country. The first county seat was Ruby, which has now been a ghost town for more than 100 years.

Okanogan County was formed out of Stevens County in February 1888. The name derives from the Okanagan language place name ukʷnaqín. The name Okanogan (Okanagan) also refers to a part of southern British Columbia.

== History ==
Before Europeans arrived, the Okanogan County region was home to numerous indigenous peoples that would eventually become part of three Indian reservations referred to as the Northern Okanogans or Sinkaietk, Tokoratums, Kartars and Konkonelps. They spoke in seven types of Interior Salish languages related to the Puget Sound tribes. The Okanogans experienced a favorable climate, camping in the winter, hunting bears in the spring, catching fish in the summer and hunting deer in fall. The camps consisted of teepee-like longhouses built with hides and bark. Women gathered nuts and berries. A popular destination for this was the Kettle Falls, where the Columbia River dropped some 20 feet (6.1 m).

Due to its remoteness, the Okanogan County area was one of the last in Washington settled by Europeans. It was an early thoroughfare used by prospectors to gain access to other communities, such as British Columbia. By the 21st century, the region specialized in agriculture, forestry and tourism. Electric producer Grand Coulee Dam was constructed between 1933 and 1942, originally with two power plants, around the Okanogan and Grant counties at the former's southern border.

== Geography ==
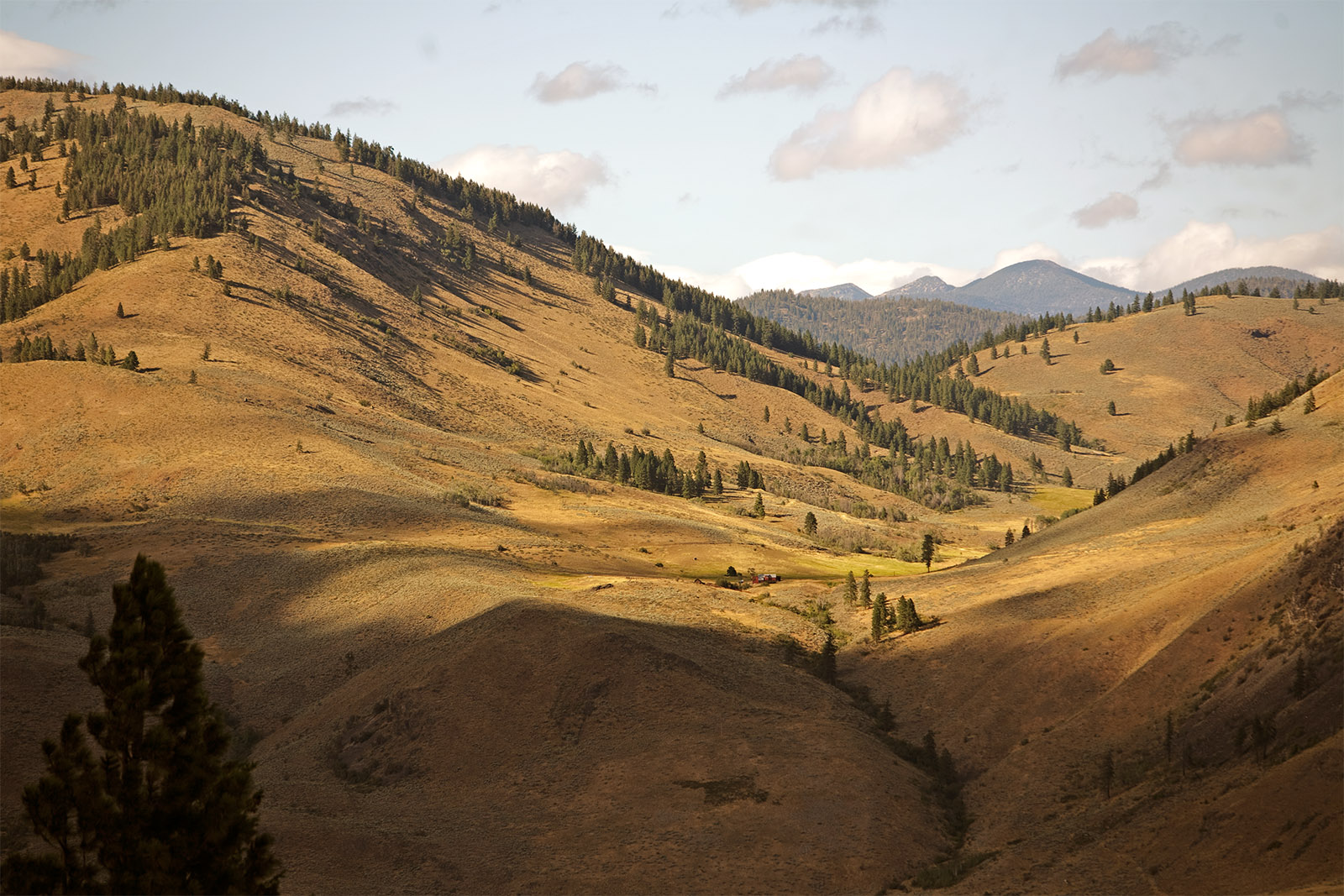
Landscape near Winthrop, Washington

According to the United States Census Bureau, the county has a total area of 5,312.7 square miles (13,760 km^{2}), of which 5,266.2 square miles (13,639 km^{2}) is land and 46.5 square miles (120 km^{2}) (0.9%) is water. It is the largest county in the state by area, and it is larger than three states in land area.

=== Geographic features ===
- Cascade Mountains
- Columbia River
- Okanogan River
- North Gardner Mountain, the highest point in Okanogan County
- Beaner Lake

=== Major highways ===
- U.S. Route 97
- State Route 20
- State Route 153

=== Adjacent counties ===
- Fraser Valley Regional District, British Columbia – northwest
- Okanagan-Similkameen Regional District, British Columbia – north
- Kootenay Boundary Regional District, British Columbia – northeast
- Ferry County – east
- Lincoln County – southeast
- Grant County – south
- Douglas County – south
- Chelan County – southwest
- Skagit County – west
- Whatcom County – west

=== National protected areas ===
- Pacific Northwest National Scenic Trail (part)
- Nez Perce National Historical Park (part)
- Okanogan–Wenatchee National Forest
- Pasayten Wilderness

== Demographics ==
Historical population
Census	Pop.	Note	%±
1890	1,467		—
1900	4,689		219.6%
1910	12,887		174.8%
1920	17,094		32.6%
1930	18,519		8.3%
1940	24,546		32.5%
1950	29,131		18.7%
1960	25,520		−12.4%
1970	25,867		1.4%
1980	30,639		18.4%
1990	33,350		8.8%
2000	39,564		18.6%
2010	41,120		3.9%
2020	42,104		2.4%
2025 (est.)	45,230	▲	7.4%
U.S. Decennial Census; 1790–1960 1900–1990; 1990–2000 2010–2020

=== 2020 census ===
As of the 2020 census, there were 42,104 people, 16,942 households, and 10,768 families residing in the county. The population density was 8.0 inhabitants per square mile (3.1/km^{2}). There were 21,720 housing units at an average density of 4.12 inhabitants per square mile (1.6/km^{2}); 22.0% were vacant.

Of the residents, 21.7% were under the age of 18, 5.3% were under 5 years of age, and 24.1% were 65 years of age or older; the median age was 44.8 years. For every 100 females there were 105.7 males, and for every 100 females age 18 and over there were 105.5 males. 19.4% of residents lived in urban areas and 80.6% lived in rural areas.

Okanogan County, Washington – Racial and ethnic composition Note: the US Census treats Hispanic/Latino as an ethnic category. This table excludes Latinos from the racial categories and assigns them to a separate category. Hispanics/Latinos may be of any race.
Race / Ethnicity (NH = Non-Hispanic)	Pop 2000	Pop 2010	Pop 2020	% 2000	% 2010	% 2020
White alone (NH)	28,362	28,092	26,522	71.69%	68.32%	62.99%
Black or African American alone (NH)	79	131	159	0.20%	0.32%	0.38%
Native American or Alaska Native alone (NH)	4,355	4,391	4,588	11.01%	10.68%	10.90%
Asian alone (NH)	172	223	268	0.43%	0.54%	0.64%
Pacific Islander alone (NH)	21	27	40	0.05%	0.07%	0.10%
Other race alone (NH)	63	42	271	0.16%	0.10%	0.64%
Mixed race or Multiracial (NH)	824	987	2,059	2.08%	2.40%	4.89%
Hispanic or Latino (any race)	5,688	7,227	8,197	14.38%	17.58%	19.47%
Total	39,564	41,120	42,104	100.00%	100.00%	100.00%

The racial makeup of the county was 65.6% White, 0.4% Black or African American, 11.6% American Indian and Alaska Native, 0.7% Asian, 0.1% Pacific Islander, 11.8% from some other race, and 9.8% from two or more races. Hispanic or Latino residents of any race comprised 19.5% of the population.

There were 16,942 households in the county, of which 27.1% had children under the age of 18 living with them and 25.3% had a female householder with no spouse or partner present. About 30.3% of all households were made up of individuals and 15.8% had someone living alone who was 65 years of age or older.

Among occupied housing units, 69.6% were owner-occupied and 30.4% were renter-occupied. The homeowner vacancy rate was 1.9% and the rental vacancy rate was 6.1%.

=== 2010 census ===
As of the 2010 census, there were 41,120 people, 16,519 households, and 10,914 families living in the county. The population density was 7.8 inhabitants per square mile (3.0/km^{2}). There were 22,245 housing units at an average density of 4.2 per square mile (1.6/km^{2}). The racial makeup of the county was 73.9% white, 11.4% American Indian, 0.6% Asian, 0.4% black or African American, 0.1% Pacific islander, 10.1% from other races, and 3.5% from two or more races. Those of Hispanic or Latino origin made up 17.6% of the population. In terms of ancestry, 21.4% were German, 12.4% were Irish, 12.2% were English, and 3.6% were American.

Of the 16,519 households, 29.4% had children under the age of 18 living with them, 49.7% were married couples living together, 10.7% had a female householder with no husband present, 33.9% were non-families, and 28.0% of all households were made up of individuals. The average household size was 2.45 and the average family size was 2.96. The median age was 42.9 years.

The median income for a household in the county was $38,551 and the median income for a family was $48,418. Males had a median income of $37,960 versus $29,032 for females. The per capita income for the county was $20,093. About 14.7% of families and 19.5% of the population were below the poverty line, including 27.3% of those under age 18 and 9.2% of those age 65 or over.

=== 2000 census ===
As of the 2000 census, there were 39,564 people, 15,027 households, and 10,579 families living in the county. The population density was 8 people per square mile (3.1 people/km^{2}). There were 19,085 housing units at an average density of 4 per square mile (1.5/km^{2}). The racial makeup of the county was 75.32% White, 0.28% Black or African American, 11.47% Native American, 0.44% Asian, 0.07% Pacific Islander, 9.58% from other races, and 2.84% from two or more races. 14.38% of the population were Hispanic or Latino of any race. 14.0% were of German, 9.5% English, 9.2% United States or American and 6.8% Irish ancestry.

There were 15,027 households, out of which 33.20% had children under the age of 18 living with them, 54.40% were married couples living together, 11.00% had a female householder with no husband present, and 29.60% were non-families. 24.50% of all households were made up of individuals, and 9.70% had someone living alone who was 65 years of age or older. The average household size was 2.58 and the average family size was 3.04.

In the county, the population was spread out, with 27.70% under the age of 18, 7.30% from 18 to 24, 25.50% from 25 to 44, 25.50% from 45 to 64, and 14.00% who were 65 years of age or older. The median age was 38 years. For every 100 females there were 99.20 males. For every 100 females age 18 and over, there were 98.00 males.

The median income for a household in the county was $29,726, and the median income for a family was $35,012. Males had a median income of $29,495 versus $22,005 for females. The per capita income for the county was $14,900. About 16.00% of families and 21.30% of the population were below the poverty line, including 28.20% of those under age 18 and 10.40% of those age 65 or over.

== Communities ==
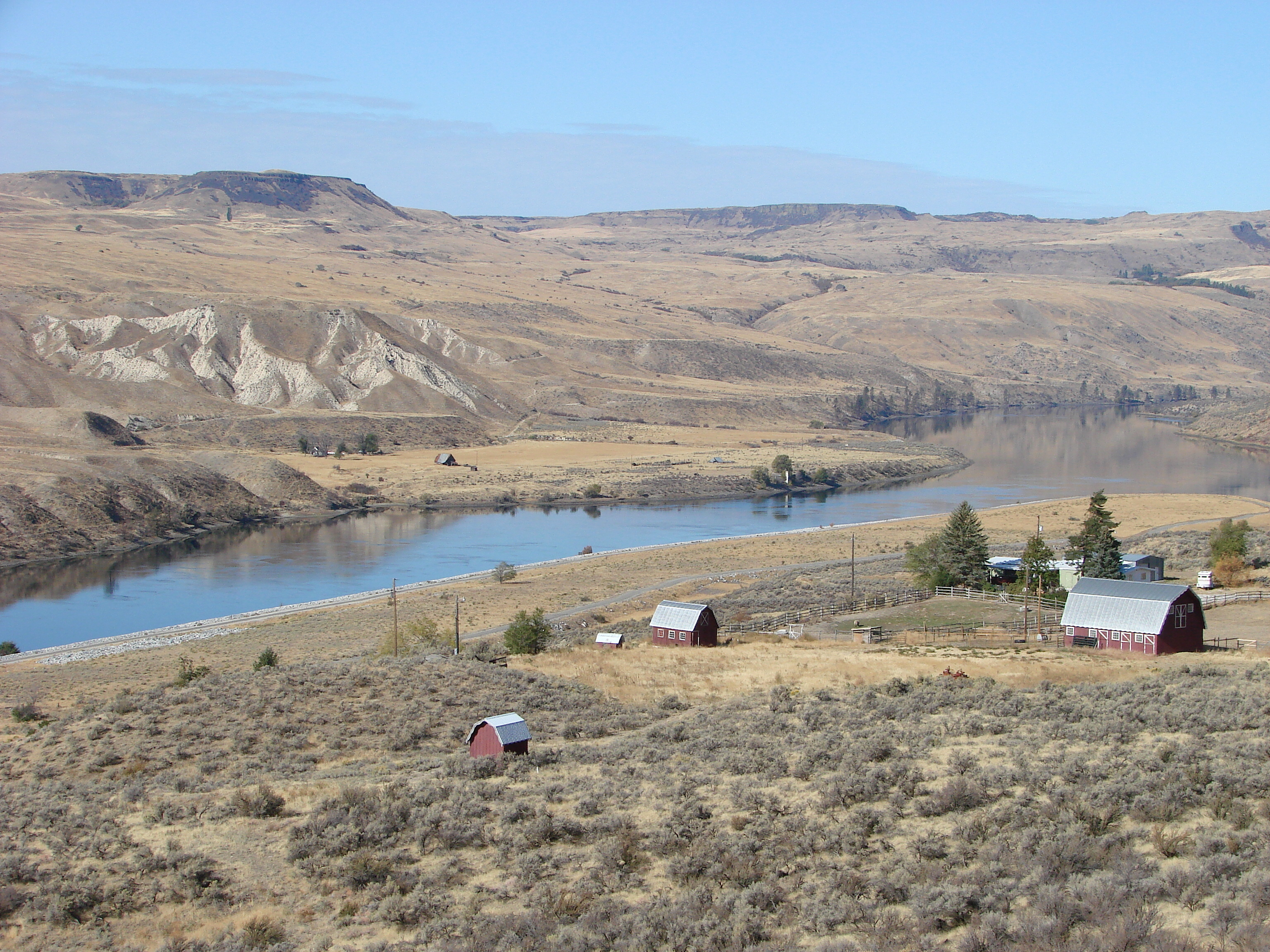
Landscape near Okanogan, Washington

=== Cities ===
- Brewster
- Okanogan (county seat)
- Omak
- Oroville
- Pateros
- Tonasket

=== Towns ===
- Conconully
- Coulee Dam (partial)
- Elmer City
- Nespelem
- Riverside
- Twisp
- Winthrop

=== Census-designated places ===
- Disautel
- Loomis
- Malott
- Methow
- Nespelem Community
- North Omak

=== Unincorporated communities ===
- Aeneas
- Azwell
- Carlton
- Cherokee
- Ellisford (aka Ellisforde)
- Havillah
- Mazama
- Monse
- Nighthawk
- Olema
- Rocky Butte
- Synarep
- Wauconda

=== Ghost towns ===
- Bodie
- Bolster
- Chesaw
- Molson
- Ruby

== Politics ==
Okanogan County was once a national bellwether county in U.S. presidential elections, voting for the nationwide winner in each presidential election from 1904 to 1992. In fact, it became the longest-running national bellwether after Crook County, Oregon, voted for George H. W. Bush in 1992. However, it has become a Republican-leaning county since 1996, when it voted for Bob Dole, with the longest national bellwether status passing on to New Castle County, Delaware.

United States presidential election results for Okanogan County, Washington
Year	Republican		Democratic		Third party(ies)	
Year	No.	%	No.	%	No.	%
1892	577	50.04%	425	36.86%	151	13.10%
1896	284	22.72%	950	76.00%	16	1.28%
1900	457	38.08%	714	59.50%	29	2.42%
1904	1,192	66.63%	435	24.32%	162	9.06%
1908	1,368	49.23%	1,074	38.65%	337	12.13%
1912	804	18.97%	1,461	34.47%	1,974	46.57%
1916	1,896	35.55%	2,924	54.82%	514	9.64%
1920	2,784	54.98%	1,260	24.88%	1,020	20.14%
1924	2,531	50.41%	721	14.36%	1,769	35.23%
1928	3,245	64.86%	1,722	34.42%	36	0.72%
1932	2,277	32.78%	3,969	57.13%	701	10.09%
1936	2,367	27.31%	5,622	64.87%	678	7.82%
1940	4,244	43.96%	5,362	55.54%	49	0.51%
1944	4,084	46.60%	4,642	52.97%	38	0.43%
1948	4,083	41.10%	5,644	56.81%	208	2.09%
1952	6,085	55.57%	4,817	43.99%	48	0.44%
1956	5,448	50.66%	5,298	49.27%	8	0.07%
1960	5,169	48.32%	5,507	51.48%	22	0.21%
1964	3,931	37.46%	6,554	62.45%	10	0.10%
1968	4,490	45.19%	4,379	44.08%	1,066	10.73%
1972	5,796	56.09%	3,835	37.11%	703	6.80%
1976	5,455	47.05%	5,543	47.81%	597	5.15%
1980	6,460	51.71%	4,634	37.09%	1,399	11.20%
1984	7,476	57.25%	5,330	40.81%	253	1.94%
1988	5,856	49.88%	5,630	47.96%	254	2.16%
1992	4,265	32.72%	5,015	38.48%	3,753	28.80%
1996	5,890	45.05%	4,810	36.79%	2,375	18.16%
2000	9,384	63.41%	4,335	29.29%	1,079	7.29%
2004	9,636	58.96%	6,309	38.61%	397	2.43%
2008	8,798	52.15%	7,613	45.13%	459	2.72%
2012	9,221	54.74%	7,108	42.19%	517	3.07%
2016	9,610	54.74%	6,298	35.87%	1,648	9.39%
2020	11,840	55.63%	8,900	41.82%	542	2.55%
2024	11,555	55.74%	8,466	40.84%	711	3.43%

== Education ==
School districts include:

- Brewster School District
- Bridgeport School District
- Curlew School District
- Grand Coulee Dam School District
- Lake Chelan School District
- Methow Valley School District
- Nespelem School District
- Okanogan School District
- Omak School District
- Oroville School District
- Pateros School District
- Republic School District
- Tonasket School District

== See also ==
- National Register of Historic Places listings in Okanogan County, Washington
- Okanogan Conservation District
