= Pateros, Washington =

City in Washington, United States

Pateros
- City
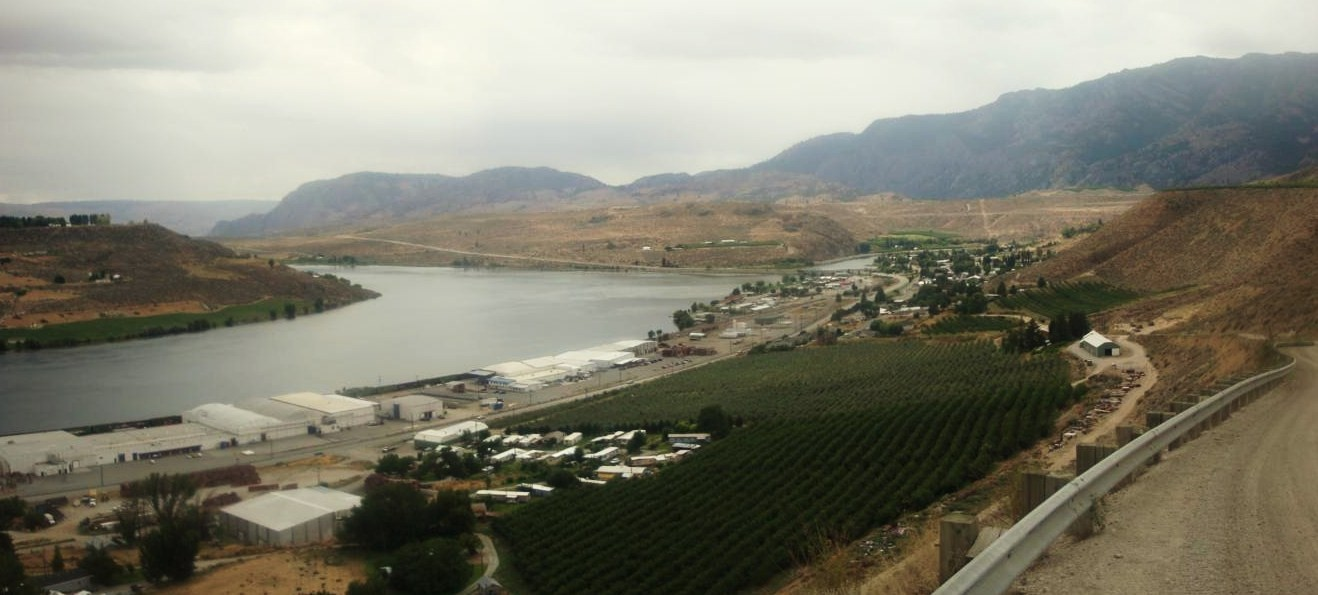
- A view Pateros, Washington from northeast of the town

- Location of Pateros, Washington

- Location within Washington (state) Location within the United States Location within Earth
- Coordinates: 48°03′12″N 119°53′58″W
- Country: United States
- State: Washington
- County: Okanogan
- Founded: c. 1886
- Incorporated: May 1, 1913
- Named for: Pateros, Metro Manila, Philippines

Government
  - Type: Mayor–council
  - Mayor: Kelly Hook

Area
  - Total: 0.70 sq mi (1.82 km^{2})
  - Land: 0.51 sq mi (1.31 km^{2})
  - Water: 0.20 sq mi (0.51 km^{2})
- Elevation: 791 ft (241 m)

Population (2020)
  - Total: 593
  - Density: 1,170/sq mi (453/km^{2})
- Time zone: UTC-8 (Pacific (PST))
  - Summer (DST): UTC-7 (PDT)
- ZIP code: 98846
- Area code: 509
- FIPS code: 53-53720
- GNIS feature ID: 2411382
- Website: City of Pateros

Pateros /pəˈtærəs/ pə-TARR-əs is a city in Okanogan County, Washington, United States. The population at the 2020 census was 593.

== History ==
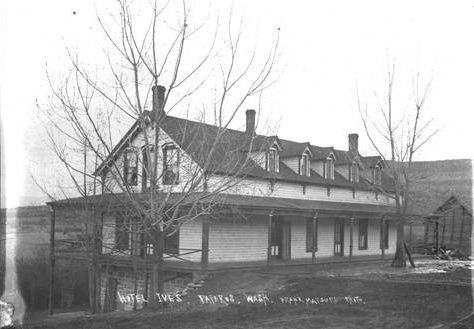
The Hotel Ives, circa 1910

Pateros was originally established as Ive's Landing in around 1886 by Lee Ives. Ives began farming the area near the confluence of the Methow and Columbia Rivers, which was populated by a small band of Native Americans and around 20 Chinese miners. Ives also built an 18-room hotel at the town site and operated a ferry crossing. The first post office was built in 1895.

In 1900, Charles Nosler acquired most of the townsite. When he visited the site, he noticed the presence of numerous ducks in the area, which reminded him of his visit to the town of Pateros in the Philippines, and so he renamed the town to Pateros. The name is derived from pato, the Spanish word for duck, which Pateros is known for. In 1903, the city consisted of four commercial establishments and nine residences and the town was sold to J.C. Steiner. Steiner vigorously promoted the town, making Pateros the principal rail shipping point between Oroville and Wenatchee. Pateros was officially incorporated on May 1, 1913.

In 1962, the Federal Power Commission granted the Douglas County Public Utility District a 50-year license to build and operate Wells Dam about 8 miles downstream of Pateros. Construction of the dam would flood much of the original city. The Pateros City Council accepted an offer to relocate the town, and the PUD spent about US$1,000,000 on moving or demolishing buildings and improving the town's infrastructure. Wells Dam went into operation in 1967. Despite relocation of the city, the population dropped by almost a third from 1960 to 1970.

Much of Pateros was destroyed by the Carlton Complex wildfire on July 17 and 18, 2014. No injuries or fatalities were reported, but at least 95 homes in the area were reported destroyed, along with at least one business.

== Geography ==
According to the United States Census Bureau, the city has a total area of 0.49 square miles (1.27 km^{2}), all of it land.

=== Climate ===
This climatic region is typified by large seasonal temperature differences, with warm to hot (and often humid) summers and cold (sometimes severely cold) winters. According to the Köppen Climate Classification system, Pateros has a humid continental climate, abbreviated "Dfb" on climate maps.

== Demographics ==
Historical population
Census	Pop.	Note	%±
1920	412		—
1930	486		18.0%
1940	484		−0.4%
1950	866		78.9%
1960	673		−22.3%
1970	472		−29.9%
1980	555		17.6%
1990	570		2.7%
2000	643		12.8%
2010	667		3.7%
2020	593		−11.1%
U.S. Decennial Census; 2020 Census

=== 2020 census ===
As of the 2020 census, Pateros had a population of 593. The median age was 37.1 years. 28.3% of residents were under the age of 18 and 17.7% of residents were 65 years of age or older. For every 100 females there were 101.7 males, and for every 100 females age 18 and over there were 92.3 males age 18 and over.

0.0% of residents lived in urban areas, while 100.0% lived in rural areas.

There were 221 households in Pateros, of which 44.3% had children under the age of 18 living in them. Of all households, 50.7% were married-couple households, 19.9% were households with a male householder and no spouse or partner present, and 22.2% were households with a female householder and no spouse or partner present. About 22.2% of all households were made up of individuals and 12.2% had someone living alone who was 65 years of age or older.

There were 250 housing units, of which 11.6% were vacant. The homeowner vacancy rate was 0.0% and the rental vacancy rate was 3.7%.

Racial composition as of the 2020 census
Race	Number	Percent
White	357	60.2%
Black or African American	0	0.0%
American Indian and Alaska Native	4	0.7%
Asian	5	0.8%
Native Hawaiian and Other Pacific Islander	0	0.0%
Some other race	113	19.1%
Two or more races	114	19.2%
Hispanic or Latino (of any race)	242	40.8%

=== 2010 census ===
As of the 2010 census, there were 667 people, 238 households, and 162 families residing in the city. The population density was 1,361.2 inhabitants per square mile (525.6/km^{2}). There were 276 housing units at an average density of 563.3 per square mile (217.5/km^{2}). The racial makeup of the city was 76.9% White, 0.1% African American, 3.1% Native American, 17.2% from other races, and 2.5% from two or more races. Hispanic or Latino of any race were 37.8% of the population.

There were 238 households, of which 39.1% had children under the age of 18 living with them, 52.1% were married couples living together, 10.5% had a female householder with no husband present, 5.5% had a male householder with no wife present, and 31.9% were non-families. 26.5% of all households were made up of individuals, and 12.2% had someone living alone who was 65 years of age or older. The average household size was 2.76 and the average family size was 3.27.

The median age in the city was 33.9 years. 30.6% of residents were under the age of 18; 8.8% were between the ages of 18 and 24; 24.6% were from 25 to 44; 24.2% were from 45 to 64; and 11.4% were 65 years of age or older. The gender makeup of the city was 51.9% male and 48.1% female.

=== 2000 census ===
As of the 2000 census, there were 643 people, 249 households, and 172 families residing in the city. The population density was 1,256.5 people per square mile (486.8/km^{2}). There were 279 housing units at an average density of 545.2 per square mile (211.2/km^{2}). The racial makeup of the city was 77.76% White, 1.40% Native American, 0.31% Asian, 19.28% from other races, and 1.24% from two or more races. Hispanic or Latino of any race were 29.86% of the population.

There were 249 households, out of which 36.1% had children under the age of 18 living with them, 56.2% were married couples living together, 10.0% had a female householder with no husband present, and 30.9% were non-families. 29.7% of all households were made up of individuals, and 14.1% had someone living alone who was 65 years of age or older. The average household size was 2.58 and the average family size was 3.22.

In the city, the population was spread out, with 27.5% under the age of 18, 9.5% from 18 to 24, 27.4% from 25 to 44, 19.0% from 45 to 64, and 16.6% who were 65 years of age or older. The median age was 35 years. For every 100 females, there were 94.3 males. For every 100 females age 18 and over, there were 91.8 males.

The median income for a household in the city was $30,938, and the median income for a family was $39,375. Males had a median income of $30,521 versus $20,208 for females. The per capita income for the city was $13,646. About 9.3% of families and 17.1% of the population were below the poverty line, including 19.7% of those under age 18 and 8.8% of those age 65 or over.

== Events ==
=== Pateros Hydro Classic ===
In mid-August Tacoma Inboard Racing Association hosts the "Pateros Hydro Classic" hydroplane race. The course is 1.25 mile oval on the Columbia River. The race starts at ten thirty in the morning and ends at night with a fireworks display.

== Notable people ==
- Richard Beyer, sculptor
- Ron Terpening, author

== Sister cities ==
International sister cities:

International

- Pateros, Metro Manila, Philippines

== See also ==
- Pateros High School
