= Lake Chelan Dam =

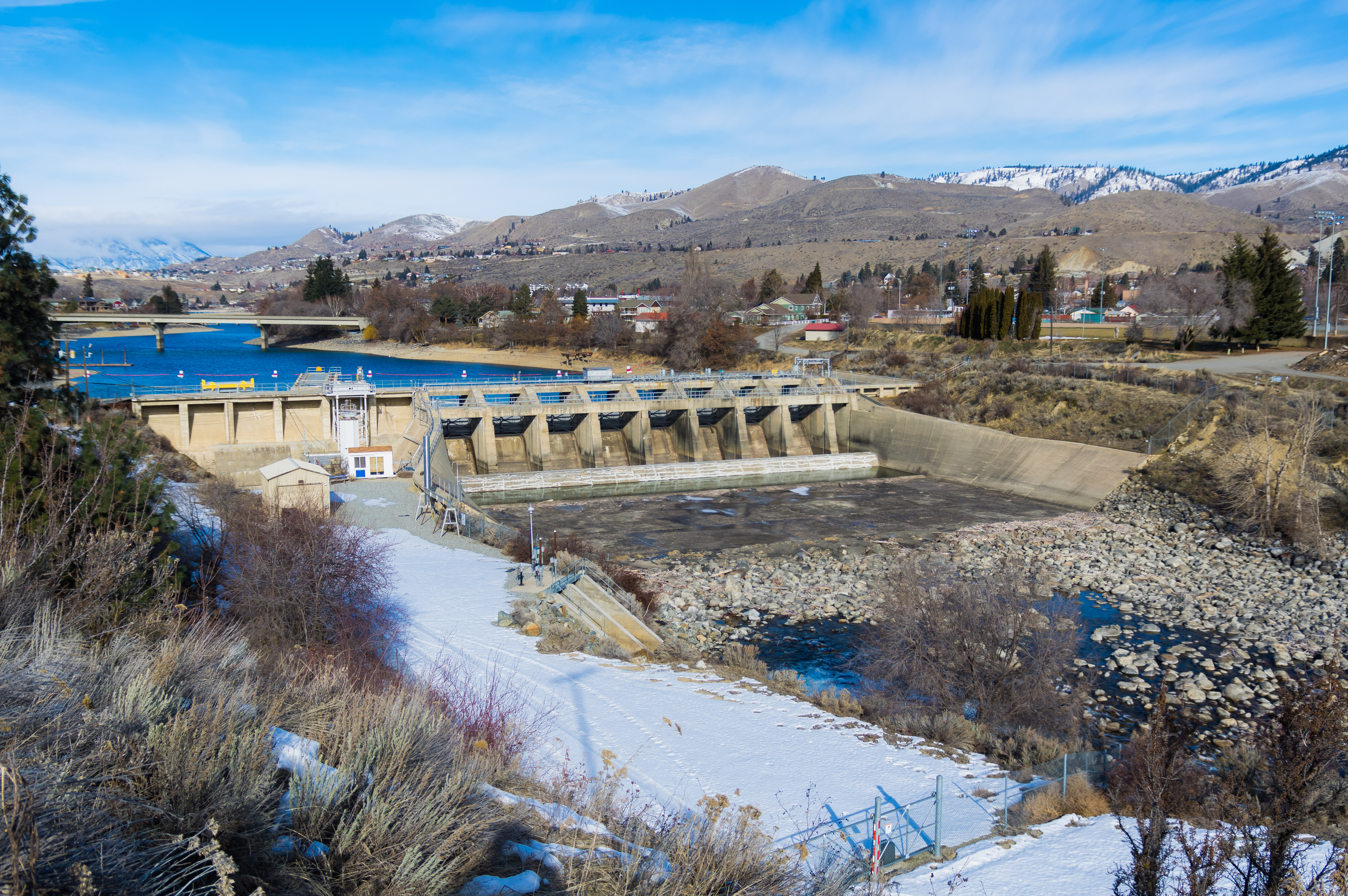
- A view of dam looking toward the lake in 2018

- Location within Washington (state)
- Official name: Lake Chelan Hydroelectric Project
- Country: USA
- Location: Chelan, Washington
- Coordinates: 47°50′4.05″N 120°0′43.23″W
- Construction began: 1926
- Opening date: 1927
- Owner: Chelan County P.U.D. No. 1

Dam and spillways
- Type of dam: Gravity structure
- Impounds: Chelan River headwater
- Height: 40 feet (12 m)
- Length: 490 feet (150 m)

Reservoir
- Creates: Raised Lake Chelan 21 ft (6.4 m)
- Total capacity: 15,800,000 acre⋅ft (19.5 km^{3})
- Catchment area: 924 sq mi (2,390 km^{2})

Power Station
- Commission date: September 1927
- Hydraulic head: 400 feet (120 m)
- Installed capacity: 59.2 megawatts
- Steel-reinforced concrete
- Lake Chelan Hydroelectric Power Plant
- U.S. National Register of Historic Places
- U.S. Historic district
- Location: Southwestern end of Lake Chelan to Columbia River
- Coordinates: 47°49′36″N 120°00′11″W
- Area: 20 acres (8.1 ha)
- MPS: Hydroelectric Power Plants in Washington State, 1890--1938 MPS
- NRHP reference No.: 88003442
- Added to NRHP: December 15, 1988

Lake Chelan Dam officially known as the Lake Chelan Hydroelectric Project is located approximately 32 miles (51 km) north of the city of Wenatchee in Chelan County. The dam is located at the lower or southeasterly end of 50.4 miles (81.1 kilometres) long Lake Chelan, and is within the limits of the city of Chelan. The powerhouse is located near the community of Chelan Falls. The reservoir has 677,400 acre-feet (835,600,000 m^{3}) of usable water storage. The 10-year average generation for the Project is 365,000 megawatt hours.

== History ==
The Chelan River has a history of dam development for navigation, power generation, and water supply. In 1894, floodwaters pushed the lake level 11 feet (3.4 m) above the old (pre-project) high-water mark. The future spillway segment of the dam was calculated and built to avoid a recurrence of such flooding. The dam was built to raise the level of Lake Chelan and completed in 1892. It was constructed to provide water for south Chelan real estate and navigation to the city of Chelan. It washed out during June of that year, only to be replaced by another structure built by the newly formed Chelan Water Power Company in 1893. The larger and stronger dam was designed to raise the lake level enough to allow steamships to land at Chelan. Nevertheless, this structure lasted only a year before washing out in a massive flood in June 1894. In early 1899, M.M. Kingman purchased the Chelan Water Power Company and built another dam, for power generation. The turning on of lights was celebrated in Chelan during May 1903. The Chelan Water Power Company was purchased by the Chelan Electric Company in 1906. It was then purchased by Spokane-based Washington Water Power Company in 1925. A year later, Washington Water Power received a 50-year federal license to construct the existing dam and powerhouse. The first generating unit was placed in commercial operation in September 1927, followed by the second unit 11 months later.

The Chelan County Public Utility District purchased the Lake Chelan Hydro Project from Washington Water Power (now Avista Corp.) in July 1955, with the proceeds of a $21 million bond issue. All of the power generated by the Project is available for Chelan County homes and businesses.

The Lake Chelan Hydroelectric Power Plant 20 acres (8.1 ha) historic district, comprising the dam, the water conveyance system, the surge tank and the power plant about 2 miles (3.2 km) southwest of the dam, was added to the National Register of Historic Places in 1988.

== Description ==
The dam is a steel-reinforced concrete gravity structure. It is 40 feet (12 m) high and 490 feet (150 m) long. It contains eight spillway bays. When the spillway gates are open, water is discharged down the normally dry Chelan River channel. Water to power the turbine generators is delivered through an underground penstock connecting the dam and the powerhouse. It delivers water from the dam at the southeasterly end of Lake Chelan to the powerhouse at Chelan Falls, a vertical drop of nearly 400 feet (120 m). This steel and concrete tunnel is approximately 2.2 miles (3.5 km) in length. The only visible portion of the tunnel is a 130-foot (40 m) high surge tank constructed on the hill above the plant to absorb hydraulic momentum of the water in case of load rejection.

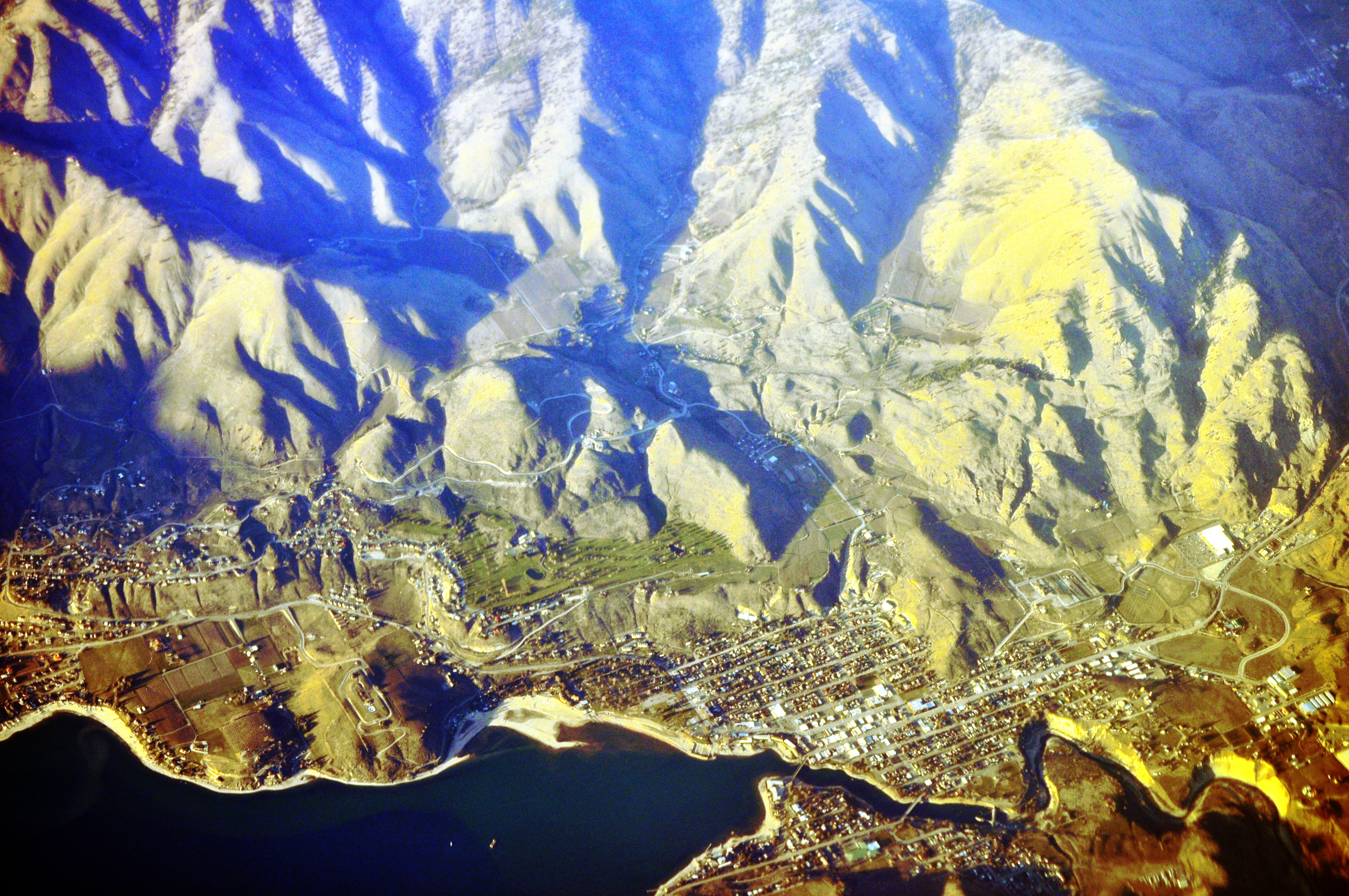
aerial view of Chelan, Washington and the lake

The powerhouse is located at Chelan Falls. It is 150 feet (46 m) long, 83 feet (25 m) wide and 130 feet (40 m) high. Besides the two generating units, the powerhouse contains a Control Room, shop facilities, switching equipment, crane, and communications equipment. Water traveling down the power tunnel is directed against two turbines rated at 24 megawatts each. The turbines rotate at 300 revolutions per minute. The original turbines were replaced in 1985 and 1986. The turbines are connected to the generators by steel shafts. They provide a combined peaking capability of 58 megawatts. The original generators were rewound in 1951 and 1952. After passing around and through the turbine blades, water is discharged into the tailrace located on the east side of the powerhouse where it flows into the Columbia River.

== See also ==
- List of dams in the Columbia River watershed
- Rocky Reach Dam
- Rock Island Dam
