= Daroga State Park =

State park in Washington State, United States

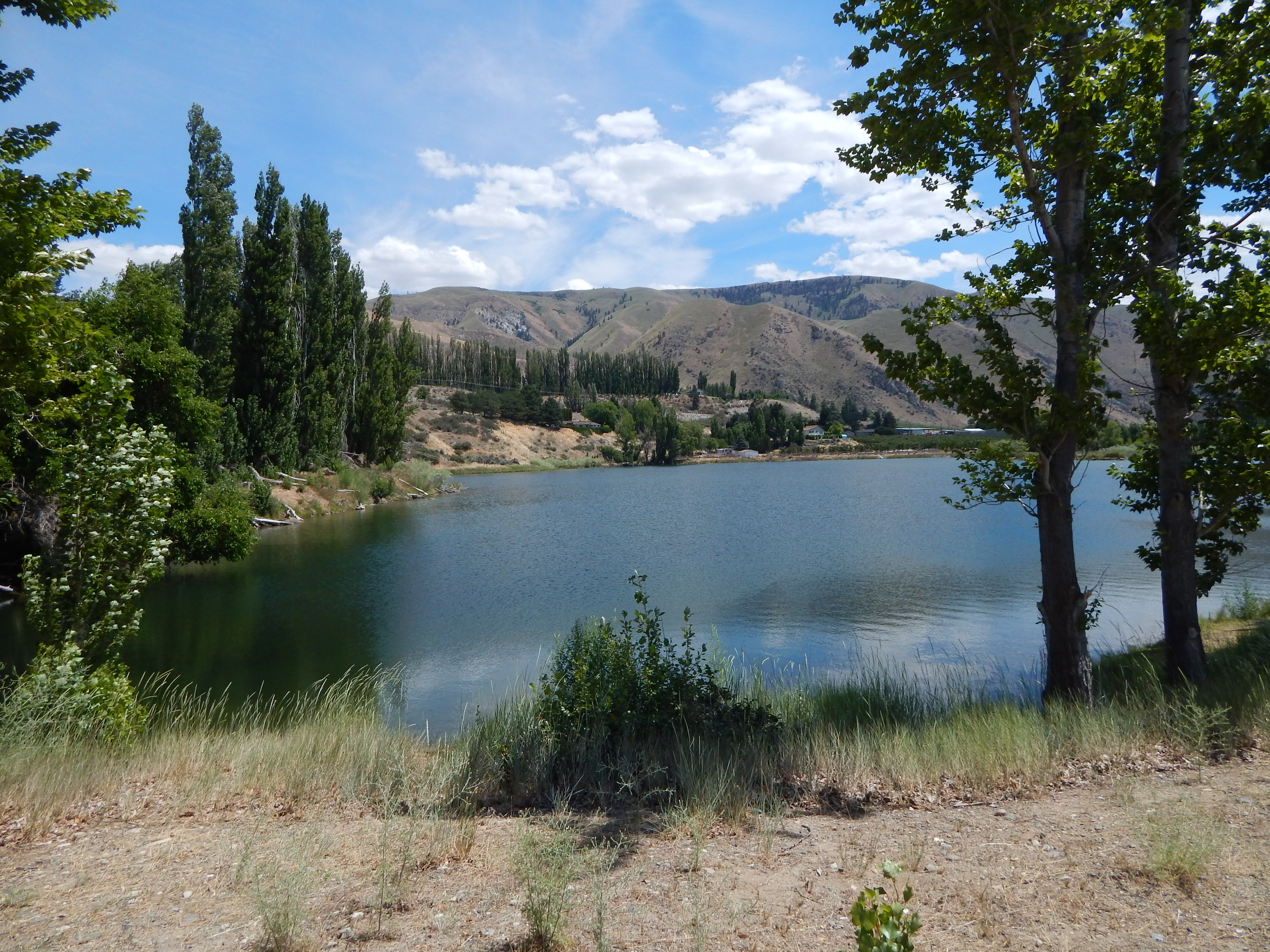

- Location within Washington (state) Location within the United States
- Interactive map of Daroga State Park
- Location: Douglas County, Washington, United States
- Coordinates: 47°42′21″N 120°11′45″W
- Area: 127 acres (51 ha)
- Established: 1981; 1990
- Administrator: Washington State Parks and Recreation Commission
- Website: Official website

Daroga State Park is a 127-acre (51 ha) public recreation area on the Columbia River located eight miles (13 km) north of Orondo at the edge of Washington's Channeled Scablands. The state park has 1.5 miles (2.4 km) of river shoreline and offers picnicking, camping, boating, fishing, swimming, waterskiing, birdwatching, wildlife viewing, and other athletic facilities. The park is managed by the Washington State Parks and Recreation Commission under a lease agreement with the owners, the Chelan County Public Utility District.

== History ==
The park occupies land that was once part of the agricultural holdings of orchard man Grady Auvil. The name "Daroga" was coined using the names of the Auvil brothers — David, Robert and Grady — and was first applied to the Daroga peach. Following construction of the Rocky Reach Dam and the creation of Lake Entiat, the park was created on a flooded portion of the Auvil orchard. In 1990, the Washington State Parks and Recreation Commission began operating the park under a lease agreement with the Chelan County PUD.
