= Entiat =

Entiat may refer to:

- Entiat people, a Native American tribe based in Washington state
- Entiat, Washington, a city
- Lake Entiat, Washington
- Entiat River, Washington
- Entiat Mountains, Washington
