= Steamboats of Lake Chelan =

Steamboats began operating on Lake Chelan in 1889 and some still operate. They were introduced for both commercial and leisure use. The history of steamboat operation and modern boat operations are limited on Lake Chelan compared to other western lakes, like Lake Coeur d'Alene due to the remote nature of Lake Chelan.

Lake Chelan is a long, glacially-carved lake in the central part of the North Cascades mountain range in northwestern Washington State. Via the short Chelan River, it is a tributary to the Okanogan River, a tributary of the Columbia. Access to points along the lake has been primarily by water, and in the early 1900s, this was done by steamboat. Located at the head of the lake is Stehekin, a resort community of about 90 people.

== History ==
Steamboats first traveled Lake Chelan in 1889. The Belle of Chelan's first voyage was to Stehekin. The first steamboats to travel the lake were powered by wood. It would take two days to travel 50.5 mi (81.3 km) from Chelan to Stehekin.

When commercial boats first traveled Lake Chelan in the 1880s, multiple companies offered transport services. In 1914 four ferry companies operated on the lake with one of them operating year-round. The state of Washington imposed a 'natural monopoly' on the service in 1927 and offered one company exclusive year-round operating rights.

Today, Lake Chelan Boat Company is the only public ferry service offered on the lake. The company has been operating as the sole-ferry provider since 1929. The Lake Chelan Boat Company operates one steamboat vessel, Lady of the Lake, and multiple other vessel types.

== Historic Vessels ==
=== Belle of Chelan ===
The Belle of Chelan was the first commercial passenger vessel to sail from Chelan to Stehekin. It was built by Charles Follett and operated in partnership with William Goggins. It was purchased by the Lake Chelan Railway and Navigation Company which is now operating as the Lake Chelan Boat Company.

=== City of Omaha ===
The City of Omaha was a 34-foot wood burning steam ship. It was shipped from Illinois to Lake Chelan in the 1890s. It was owned by Thomas R. Gibson and operated in partnership with Howard Graham. After being used by the public for multiple years it was purchased by a private family and rechristened as the Maid of Mountain Park.

=== Queen/The Stehekin ===
The Queen first sailed Lake Chelan in 1892. It was the first stern-wheeler to operate on Lake Chelan. After a year of operations Queen was wrecked during a storm and had to be rebuilt as The Stehekin. Steward Johnson and R.J. Watkins took ownership and reintroduced the vessel.

The Stehekin hauled both passengers and freight along the lake. The passenger fair in 1897 was $4.00. The Stehekin was taken out of passenger service and converted into a barge in 1904.

== Current Operations ==
The Lake Chelan Boat Company is the only active Steamboat operator in Lake Chelan. The company also operates multiple other vessels including Lady Express and Lady Liberty. Both of those vessels are not steamboats. The Lake Chelan Boat Company operates year round and has drop off points including Lucerne/Holden Village, Prince Creek and Sethekin.

Lawsuits continue to be filed to allow other operators to have commercial boat operations on the lake. In 2020, the U.S. Supreme Court declined to review the case. These lawsuits are not limited to steamboat operations.
