= Lincoln Rock State Park =

State park in Washington (state), United States

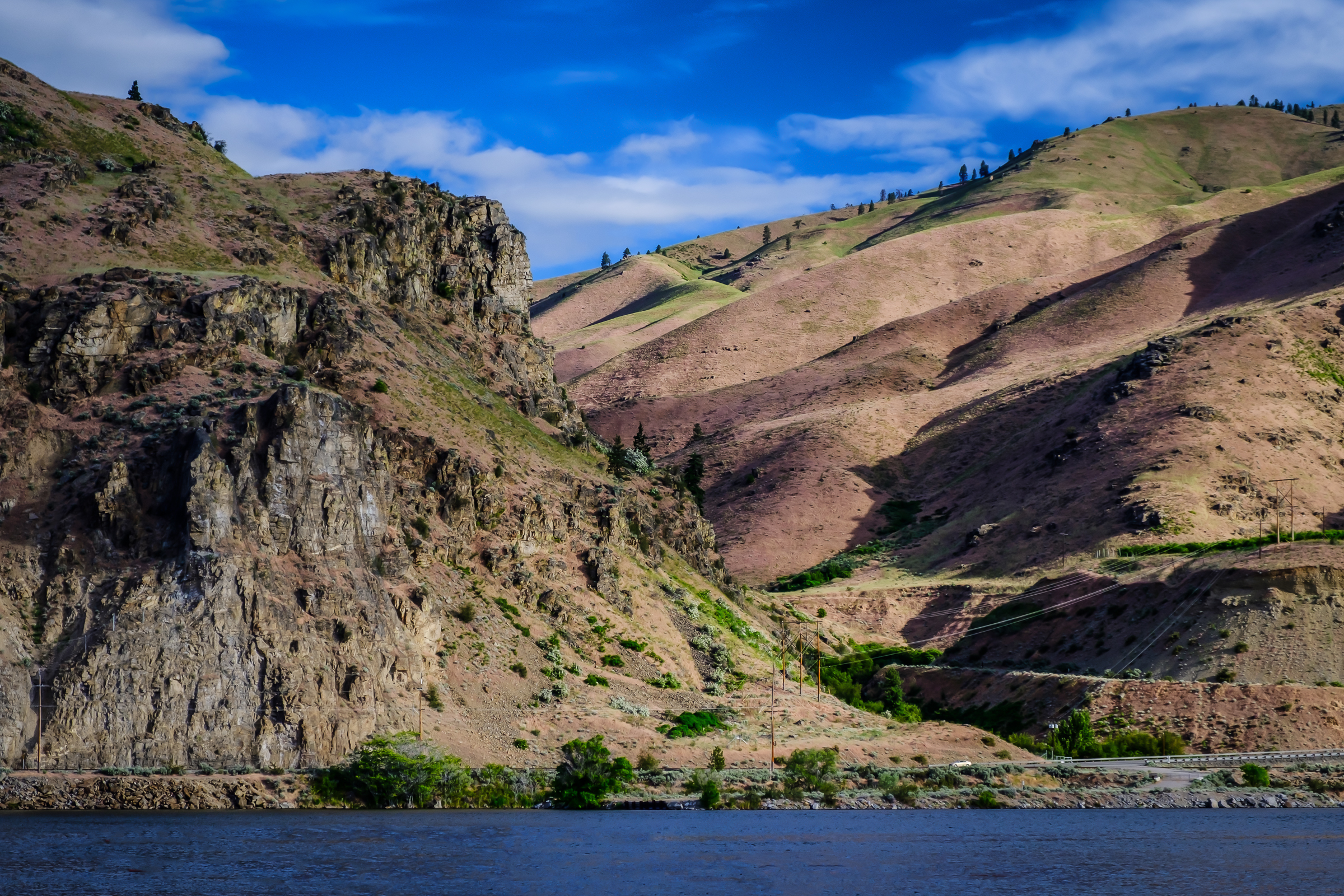
- Lincoln Rock across Lake Entiat

- Location within Washington (state) Location within the United States
- Location: Douglas County, Washington, United States
- Coordinates: 47°32′23″N 120°16′54″W
- Area: 86 acres (35 ha)
- Established: 1980
- Administrator: Washington State Parks and Recreation Commission
- Website: Official website

Lincoln Rock State Park is a public recreation area on the east side of the Columbia River's Lake Entiat, in Washington, US, seven miles (11 km) north of Wenatchee and one mile upstream from the Rocky Reach Dam. The state park covers 86 acres (35 ha) opposite the cliff formation for which it is named. The park provides views of the south end of Swakane Canyon and of Turtle Rock Island in Lake Entiat, a 150-acre nature preserve that was isolated from the mainland when the lake formed in the 1960s. The park offers water activities, including fishing, boating, and swimming, in addition to facilities for picnicking, camping, hiking, and field sports. It is managed by the Washington State Parks and Recreation Commission under a lease agreement with the owners, the Chelan County Public Utility District.
