= Rock Island Pool =

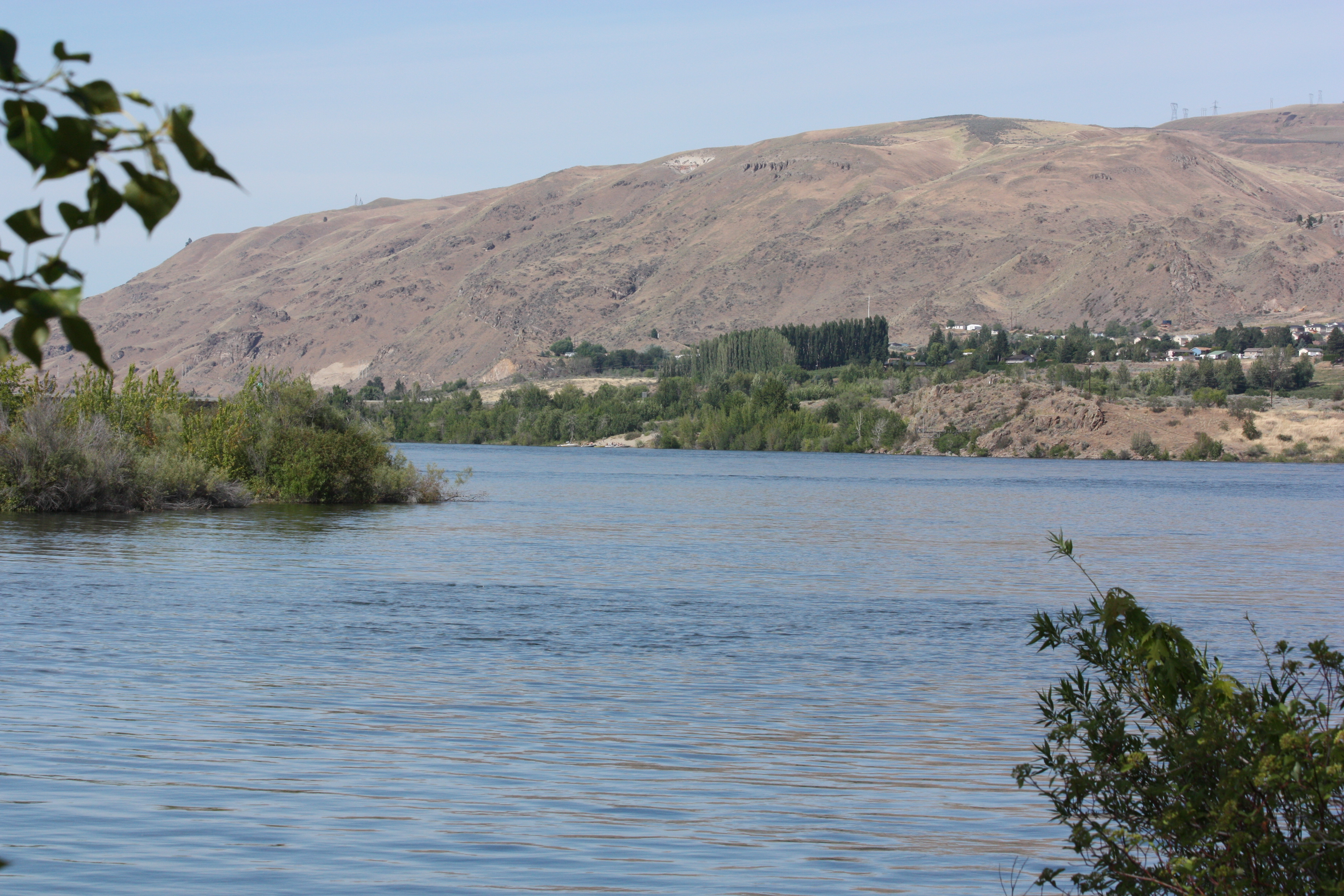
- Rock Island Pool from Wenatchee

- Location within Washington (state) Location within the United States
- Location: Chelan / Douglas counties, Washington, United States
- Coordinates: 47°20′33″N 120°5′37″W
- Type: reservoir
- Primary inflows: Columbia River
- Primary outflows: Columbia River
- Basin countries: United States

Rock Island Pool is a reservoir on the Columbia River in the U.S. state of Washington. It was created in 1933 with the construction of Rock Island Dam. The reservoir stretches from there upstream to the Rocky Reach Dam.

== See also ==
- List of dams in the Columbia River watershed
