= Uno Peak Fire =

2017 wildfire in Washington, United States

- Part of the 2017 Washington wildfires
- Date: August 30, 2017 – October 2017
- Location: Lake Chelan, Chelan County, Washington, United States
- Coordinates: 48.117°N 120.377°W

Statistics
- Burned area: 8,726 acres (35 km^{2})

Impacts
- Structures lost: 1

Ignition
- Cause: Human caused

Map
- Location of fire in Washington.

The Uno Peak Fire was a wildfire on the slopes of Lake Chelan, approximately 15 miles from Manson, Washington in the United States. The human caused fire was started on August 30, 2017. The fire burned a total of 8,726 acres (35 km^{2}).

== Incidents ==
=== August ===
The Uno Peak Fire occurred on August 30, 2017, on the steep, eastern shore slopes of Lake Chelan, approximately 15 miles from Manson, Washington. At the time, the cause of the fire remained unknown. The fire expanded to 50 acres (0.20 km^{2}) by the next day. Firefighters immediately began fighting the fire with assistance from one airtanker and three helicopters that provided water delivery. Areas around the fire were closed, specifically the Summer Blossom and Safety Harbor Trailheads and the South Navarre Campground. The fire was burning on fuels comprising timber, grass and rugged terrain.

=== September ===
By September 1, the fire had grown to 400 acres (2 km^{2}). Dozers were called in to construct fire lines and crews began preparing forest roads for new fire growth. Two more campgrounds were closed. On September 2, a second fire, the Ferry Peak Fire, was reported a mere two miles northwest of the Uno Peak Fire. Roads and additional trails were closed. The fire had grown to 2,511 acres (10 km^{2}) by September 4 due to record breaking high temperatures and wind. A voluntary evacuation was put in place for two residences on Lake Chelan. The fire grew overnight to 6,159 acres (25 km^{2}) and was reported at 1 percent containment. Two properties in the area remained threatened and crews worked on protecting the threatened areas. The historic Crow Cabin was destroyed.

By September 10, the fire had grown to 7,236 acres (29 km^{2}), despite moderate temperatures and low winds that helped keep it under 7,000 acres (28 km^{2}) for almost a week. The Washington Air National Guard began lending air support to the fire with two Sikorsky UH-60 Black Hawks. The Silver State Hotshots from Nevada arrived on September 13 to help fight the fire. The next day, the fire spread to Big Goat Mountain and Lone Fir Creek. The fire had grown to 8,060 acres (33 km^{2}).

== October ==
The fire had subsided by October, burning a total of 8,726 acres (35 km^{2}).

== Effects/Impact ==
The Uno Peak Fire burned in prior burn areas from the Rex Fire (2001) and the Safety Harbor Fire (1971). In October, Central Washington Burned Area Emergency Response (BAER) assessed the burn area and requested $84,470 in funding to help with threats to human life, safety, property, and critical natural or cultural resources in the wake of the fire. BAER reported specific concerns regarding the increased risk of flooding and debris laden flows at Safety Harbor and Lone Fir Creek which could impact tourist activities and threaten structures in the area.
