= Chelan County Public Utility District =

Public utility district in Washington, United States

Coordinates: 47°25′47″N 120°18′55″W

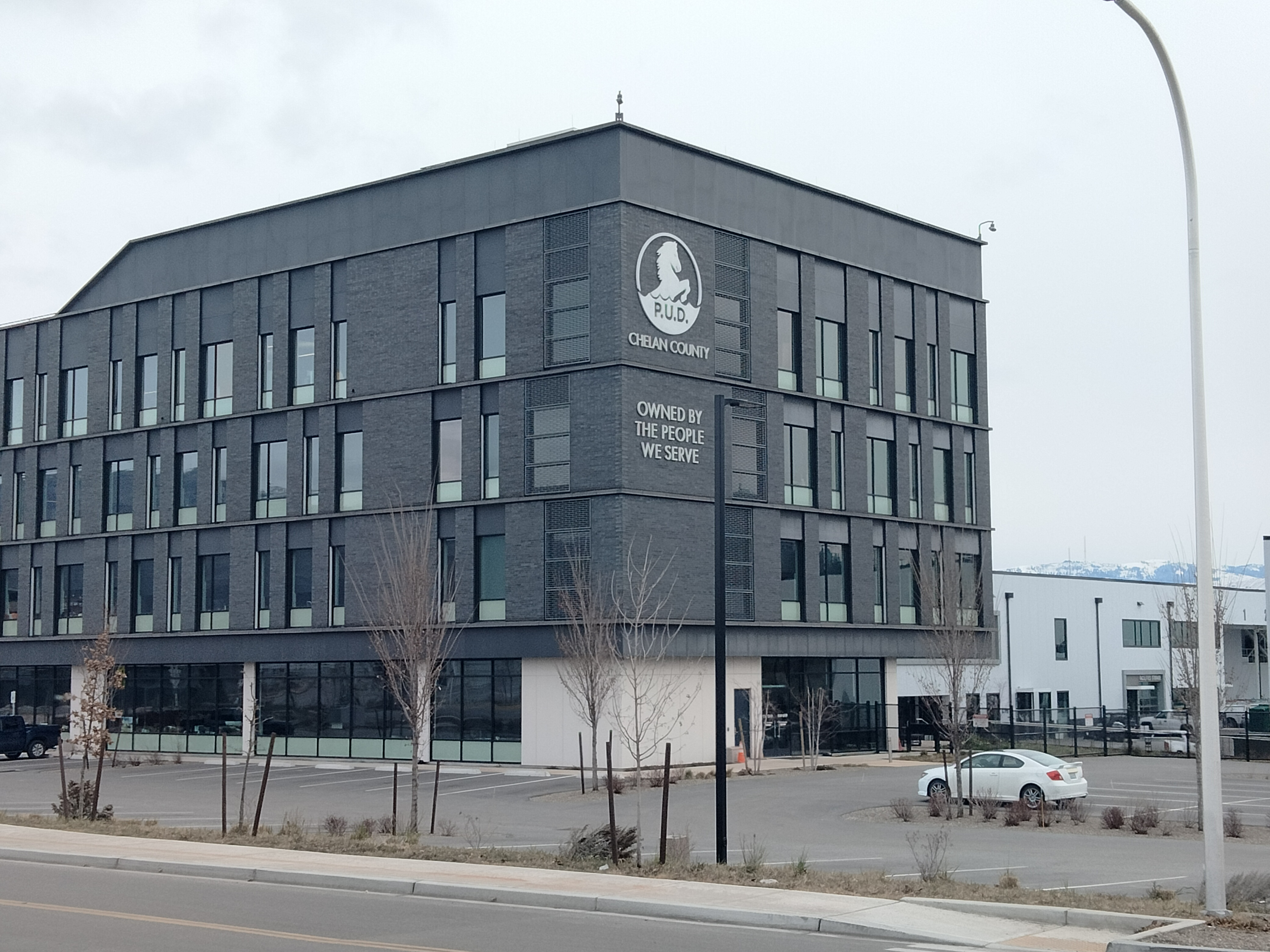
- Founded: 1936
- Headquarters: Wenatchee, Washington, U.S.
- Products: Public utility
- Production output: 9 million megawatt-hours

The Chelan County Public Utility District, or Chelan County PUD, provides electric, water, wastewater public utility and telecommunications services in Chelan County, in north-central Washington in the United States.

It is organized under state statute as a nonprofit municipal corporation and functions as a customer-owned public co-operative energy district. It is governed by a Board of Commissioners elected by the customer-owners, who, as owners, receive dividends (in the form of reduced rates) based on the income of the District.

== History and operations ==
Established in 1936, the PUD began providing electric service in 1947. Today the PUD operates electric, water, and wastewater utilities. The electric portion of the utility includes electric generating stations and distribution facilities. Under its charter, the District is authorized to purchase electric energy; sell electric energy at wholesale and retail prices; acquire, construct and operate electric generating plants and transmission and distribution facilities; and issue revenue bonds for financing the acquisition and construction of electric properties, or for other corporate purposes.

Generating stations include three hydroelectric dams, as well as a limited amount of solar power. The District maintains diesel generators for use in emergencies. Distribution facilities include transmission lines, switchyards and ancillary equipment.

== Hydropower ==
Chelan County PUD owns and operates the nation's second largest nonfederal, publicly owned hydroelectric generating system. Two of the District's hydropower stations, Rocky Reach Dam and Rock Island Dam, are part of an 11-dam system on the U.S. portion of the Columbia River, which is fed by the fourth largest drainage system in North America. Even during the driest years on record (1928 through 1932), the Columbia River's runoff was still 71 percent of normal. The District's third hydro project, Lake Chelan and Chelan River, serves a dual purpose of generating power and regulating the level of 50 mi (80 km) long Lake Chelan, the third deepest body of fresh water in the United States.

The District's three hydroelectric generating projects have a combined total generating capacity of over 2,000 megawatts of hydropower, advantageous because of its low-cost, nonpolluting, and renewable nature. The three produce about 9 million megawatt-hours of power each year, enough to meet the needs of a city of more than 900,000.

37 percent of the total generating capacity is needed to meet the needs of its Chelan County customers. The remaining 63 percent of the total generating capacity is mainly sold to four principal power purchasers: Puget Sound Energy, Avista Corporation, PacifiCorp, and Portland General Electric Company transmitted throughout the Pacific Northwest over a 16,000 sq mi (41,000 km^{2}) grid of high-voltage transmission lines. Chelan County residents and more than 7 million electric customers in the Pacific Northwest benefit from the low-cost electricity produced by the District. District residents, however, reaped the greatest rewards: The average residential electric rate in Chelan County is about 3 cents per kilowatt hour. By comparison, the national average residential rate is 8 cents per kilowatt hour, 267% more.

== Other Utilities ==
Chelan County PUD also offers water and wastewater services, as well as Washington state's largest open-access, fiber-to-the-premises fiber-optic network.

== Parks ==
Chelan County PUD also owns a network of fourteen parks and recreation areas as part of its hydroelectric licensing guidelines, seven of which are maintained by the PUD Parks and Recreation Department, seven others are maintained by either a municipal or state government.

=== Parks in the Chelan Area ===
In the area around Chelan, the PUD owns and operates Chelan Falls Park, Chelan Falls Powerhouse Park, Chelan Riverwalk Park, and Beebe Bridge Park.

=== Parks in the Wenatchee Area ===
In the area around Wenatchee, the PUD owns and operates Wenatchee Riverfront Park, Walla Walla Point Park, and Rock Island Hydro Park (located just south of East Wenatchee in Douglas County).

The Apple Capital Recreation Loop Trail was constructed with funding from the PUD as part of dam mitigation and was completed in 1995.

== See also ==
- Port of Chelan County
- Rocky Reach Dam
- Rock Island Dam
- Lake Chelan Dam
