= Entiat, Washington =

- City
- Nickname: Gateway to Recreation
- Location in the state of Washington
- Coordinates: 47°40′41″N 120°13′03″W
- Country: United States
- State: Washington
- County: Chelan
- Incorporated: April 25, 1944

Government
  - Mayor: Renee Swearingen

Area
  - Total: 2.81 sq mi (7.29 km^{2})
  - Land: 2.18 sq mi (5.64 km^{2})
  - Water: 0.64 sq mi (1.65 km^{2})
- Elevation: 929 ft (283 m)

Population (2020)
  - Total: 1,326
  - Density: 587.4/sq mi (226.81/km^{2})
- Time zone: UTC-8 (PST)
  - Summer (DST): UTC-7 (PDT)
- ZIP code: 98822
- Area code: 509
- FIPS code: 53-22010
- GNIS feature ID: 2410447
- Website: City of Entiat

Entiat /ˈɛn(t)iˌæt/ is a city in Chelan County, Washington, United States. It is part of the Wenatchee−East Wenatchee Metropolitan Statistical Area. The population was 1,326 at the 2020 census.

The name "Entiat" refers to the indigenous Entiat people, whose name comes from the Moses-Columbian Salishan word /nt'yátkʷ/, [nt'iátkʷ], "place of grassy water", from /na-/, "place", /st'íyaʔ/, "tall grass, hay", and /-atkʷ/, "water".

== History ==
Columbia River Chinook Indians settled the Entiat Valley in the 1800s. Chief Shil-how-Saskt (Silico Saska) selected the congruence of the Columbia and Entiat rivers as the place for his camp.

The Albert Long Museum in Entiat opened in 1980, in one of only two buildings (built 1895) that survived the opening of Rocky Reach Dam. It houses historical items from local logging and fruit industries.

=== First town ===
In 1877, Lewis Detwiler, the first white settler, arrived in the Entiat Valley. In the late 1880s settlers and their children learned Chinook Jargon to communicate with the indigenous population. Local historian Lindley Hull noted that many of the town's schoolchildren would speak in Chinook to one another in the late 1880s and early 1890s. In 1896, Chief Silico Saska sold the town site of Entiat. He died in 1903.

This first town site was located approx. half a mile west of the Columbia River, on Entiat River's north side. The first public school was established in Entiat in 1891. In 1895 the first Entiat Post Office was established. The Entiat Power Plant opened for business in 1908. The Keystone Fruit Company opened for business in the valley in 1910. E.P. Murphy began publishing the Entiat Times in 1913, and railroad service began in Entiat in 1914. In 1915 only six businesses survived a fire. The Entiat school opened in 1916 in its current location.

=== Second town ===
In 1921 a new fire razed First Town, and the second town site of Entiat was secured.

In 1920, the tradition of Numeral Mountain began as High School seniors painted their graduation class number on the Mountainside across the Entiat River from the school. Entiat was officially incorporated on April 25, 1944.

=== Third town ===
In 1960, Rocky Reach Dam was constructed downriver from Entiat; much of the town had to be relocated to higher ground due to the rising waters behind the dam. Most of the original buildings were razed or moved to a location north of the original town. This third town of Entiat was officially open for business in 1961.

The new Entiat Park re-opened for camping on Friday, May 22, 2015, after being closed for over a year.

== Notable people ==
Charles Glen King (1896–1988), biochemist, pioneer in the field of nutrition research

== Geography ==
Entiat is located at the confluence of the Entiat and Columbia rivers. This section of the Columbia is known as Lake Entiat. This is the reservoir formed behind Rocky Reach Dam. The town is situated between the eastern foothills of the Cascade Mountain range, Lake Entiat and the Entiat River.

According to the United States Census Bureau, the city has a total area of 2.74 square miles (7.10 km^{2}), of which, 2.11 square miles (5.46 km^{2}) is land and 0.63 square miles (1.63 km^{2}) is water.

== Climate ==
Climate data for Entiat, Washington (Entiat Fish Hatchery) (1991–2020 normals, extremes 1989–present)
| Month | Jan | Feb | Mar | Apr | May | Jun | Jul | Aug | Sep | Oct | Nov | Dec | Year |
|---|---|---|---|---|---|---|---|---|---|---|---|---|---|
| Record high °F (°C) | 56 (13) | 63 (17) | 76 (24) | 87 (31) | 97 (36) | 113 (45) | 110 (43) | 107 (42) | 100 (38) | 89 (32) | 70 (21) | 69 (21) | 113 (45) |
| Mean maximum °F (°C) | 48.7 (9.3) | 54.5 (12.5) | 66.4 (19.1) | 77.9 (25.5) | 88.7 (31.5) | 93.9 (34.4) | 100.2 (37.9) | 100.1 (37.8) | 92.2 (33.4) | 78.3 (25.7) | 59.6 (15.3) | 49.6 (9.8) | 101.5 (38.6) |
| Mean daily maximum °F (°C) | 35.3 (1.8) | 43.0 (6.1) | 53.7 (12.1) | 63.2 (17.3) | 72.6 (22.6) | 78.7 (25.9) | 88.0 (31.1) | 88.0 (31.1) | 79.1 (26.2) | 63.2 (17.3) | 46.1 (7.8) | 35.5 (1.9) | 62.2 (16.8) |
| Daily mean °F (°C) | 30.2 (−1.0) | 35.7 (2.1) | 43.7 (6.5) | 51.2 (10.7) | 59.3 (15.2) | 65.3 (18.5) | 72.8 (22.7) | 72.3 (22.4) | 64.2 (17.9) | 51.8 (11.0) | 39.1 (3.9) | 30.7 (−0.7) | 51.4 (10.8) |
| Mean daily minimum °F (°C) | 25.0 (−3.9) | 28.3 (−2.1) | 33.7 (0.9) | 39.2 (4.0) | 45.9 (7.7) | 51.9 (11.1) | 57.5 (14.2) | 56.6 (13.7) | 49.4 (9.7) | 40.4 (4.7) | 32.2 (0.1) | 25.8 (−3.4) | 40.5 (4.7) |
| Mean minimum °F (°C) | 7.5 (−13.6) | 13.6 (−10.2) | 21.1 (−6.1) | 28.5 (−1.9) | 33.7 (0.9) | 39.6 (4.2) | 45.7 (7.6) | 45.1 (7.3) | 37.3 (2.9) | 26.8 (−2.9) | 17.8 (−7.9) | 10.2 (−12.1) | 3.3 (−15.9) |
| Record low °F (°C) | −13 (−25) | −9 (−23) | 5 (−15) | 13 (−11) | 14 (−10) | 24 (−4) | 31 (−1) | 26 (−3) | 22 (−6) | 16 (−9) | −4 (−20) | −16 (−27) | −16 (−27) |
| Average precipitation inches (mm) | 2.01 (51) | 1.30 (33) | 1.41 (36) | 0.76 (19) | 0.95 (24) | 0.76 (19) | 0.33 (8.4) | 0.27 (6.9) | 0.40 (10) | 1.16 (29) | 1.91 (49) | 2.38 (60) | 13.64 (346) |
| Average snowfall inches (cm) | 11.8 (30) | 5.4 (14) | 1.4 (3.6) | 0.0 (0.0) | 0.0 (0.0) | 0.0 (0.0) | 0.0 (0.0) | 0.0 (0.0) | 0.0 (0.0) | 0.1 (0.25) | 4.3 (11) | 16.5 (42) | 39.5 (100) |
| Average precipitation days (≥ 0.01 in) | 10.6 | 8.6 | 7.9 | 5.4 | 5.7 | 4.9 | 2.2 | 1.9 | 2.9 | 6.7 | 10.3 | 11.0 | 78.1 |
| Average snowy days (≥ 0.1 in) | 6.0 | 3.3 | 1.6 | 0.0 | 0.0 | 0.0 | 0.0 | 0.0 | 0.0 | 0.1 | 2.2 | 7.7 | 20.9 |
Source: NOAA

== Demographics ==
Historical population
| Census | Pop. | Note | %± |
|---|---|---|---|
| 1950 | 420 | | — |
| 1960 | 357 | | −15.0% |
| 1970 | 355 | | −0.6% |
| 1980 | 445 | | 25.4% |
| 1990 | 449 | | 0.9% |
| 2000 | 957 | | 113.1% |
| 2010 | 1,112 | | 16.2% |
| 2020 | 1,326 | | 19.2% |
U.S. Decennial Census

=== 2020 census ===
As of the 2020 census, Entiat had a population of 1,326 and a median age of 42.3 years. 22.5% of residents were under the age of 18, and 21.3% were 65 years of age or older. For every 100 females there were 103.7 males, and for every 100 females age 18 and over there were 99.8 males age 18 and over.

0.0% of residents lived in urban areas, while 100.0% lived in rural areas.

There were 481 households in Entiat, of which 34.3% had children under the age of 18 living in them. Of all households, 56.8% were married-couple households, 16.0% were households with a male householder and no spouse or partner present, and 20.2% were households with a female householder and no spouse or partner present. About 19.8% of all households were made up of individuals and 8.9% had someone living alone who was 65 years of age or older.

There were 575 housing units, of which 16.3% were vacant. The homeowner vacancy rate was 0.3% and the rental vacancy rate was 11.3%.

Racial composition as of the 2020 census
| Race | Number | Percent |
|---|---|---|
| White | 918 | 69.2% |
| Black or African American | 0 | 0.0% |
| American Indian and Alaska Native | 17 | 1.3% |
| Asian | 11 | 0.8% |
| Native Hawaiian and Other Pacific Islander | 3 | 0.2% |
| Some other race | 227 | 17.1% |
| Two or more races | 150 | 11.3% |
| Hispanic or Latino (of any race) | 336 | 25.3% |

=== 2010 census ===
As of the 2010 census, there were 1,112 people, 421 households, and 305 families residing in the city. The population density was 527.0 inhabitants per square mile (203.5/km^{2}). There were 495 housing units at an average density of 234.6 per square mile (90.6/km^{2}). The racial makeup of the city was 81.5% White, 0.4% African American, 0.4% Native American, 0.2% Asian, 0.4% Pacific Islander, 13.8% from other races, and 3.3% from two or more races. Hispanic or Latino of any race were 20.7% of the population.

There were 421 households, of which 33.5% had children under the age of 18 living with them, 54.4% were married couples living together, 10.2% had a female householder with no husband present, 7.8% had a male householder with no wife present, and 27.6% were non-families. 20.7% of all households were made up of individuals, and 7.4% had someone living alone who was 65 years of age or older. The average household size was 2.64 and the average family size was 2.99.

The median age in the city was 40.1 years. 25.3% of residents were under the age of 18; 8.4% were between the ages of 18 and 24; 22.1% were from 25 to 44; 29.7% were from 45 to 64; and 14.4% were 65 years of age or older. The gender makeup of the city was 51.5% male and 48.5% female.

=== 2000 census ===
As of the 2000 census, there were 957 people, 342 households, and 244 families residing in the city. The population density was 700.6 people per square mile (269.7/km^{2}). There were 400 housing units at an average density of 292.8 per square mile (112.7/km^{2}). The racial makeup of the city was 79.31% White, 0.52% African American, 1.67% Native American, 0.21% Asian, 16.51% from other races, and 1.78% from two or more races. Hispanic or Latino of any race were 22.57% of the population.

There were 342 households, out of which 38.6% had children under the age of 18 living with them, 57.9% were married couples living together, 7.3% had a female householder with no husband present, and 28.4% were non-families. 21.3% of all households were made up of individuals, and 7.9% had someone living alone who was 65 years of age or older. The average household size was 2.80 and the average family size was 3.27.

In the city, the age distribution of the population shows 32.5% under the age of 18, 8.0% from 18 to 24, 27.6% from 25 to 44, 21.6% from 45 to 64, and 10.2% who were 65 years of age or older. The median age was 33 years. For every 100 females, there were 96.9 males. For every 100 females age 18 and over, there were 97.6 males.

The median income for a household in the city was $33,450, and the median income for a family was $37,083. Males had a median income of $33,487 versus $21,324 for females. The per capita income for the city was $13,529. About 9.1% of families and 14.0% of the population were below the poverty line, including 14.4% of those under age 18 and 5.7% of those age 65 or over.
