= Chelan Falls, Washington =

Unincorporated community in Washington, United States

- Census-designated place
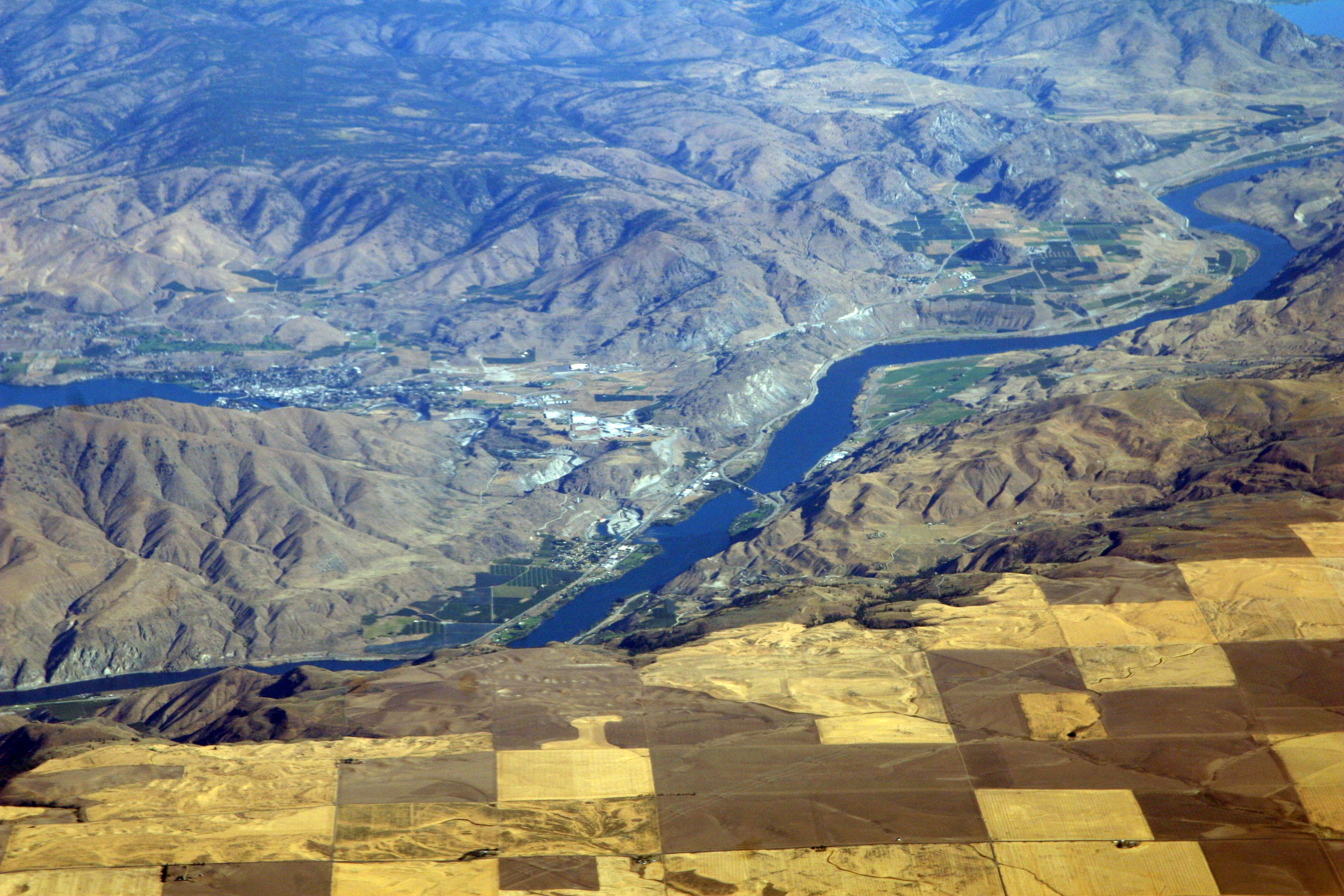
- Chelan Falls from above

- Location within Washington (state)
- Coordinates: 47°47′58″N 119°59′18″W
- Country: United States
- State: Washington
- County: Chelan

Area
  - Total: 0.28 sq mi (0.72 km^{2})
  - Land: 0.28 sq mi (0.72 km^{2})
  - Water: 0 sq mi (0.0 km^{2})
- Elevation: 778 ft (237 m)

Population (2020)
  - Total: 340
  - Density: 1,178/sq mi (454.9/km^{2})
- Time zone: UTC-8 (Pacific (PST))
  - Summer (DST): UTC-7 (PDT)
- ZIP code: 98817
- Area code: 509
- GNIS feature ID: 2586729

Chelan Falls is a census-designated place and unincorporated community in Chelan County, Washington, United States. The population was 340 at the 2020 census. Chelan Falls is located on the Columbia River at the mouth of the Chelan River, 5 miles (8 km) south-southeast of Chelan. Chelan Falls has a post office with ZIP code 98817.

== Demographics ==
Historical population
Census	Pop.	Note	%±
2010	329		—
2020	340		3.3%
U.S. Decennial Census; 2000 2010

Chelan Falls first appeared as a census designated place in the 2010 U.S. census.

=== Racial and ethnic composition ===
Chelan Falls CDP, Washington – Racial and ethnic composition Note: the US Census treats Hispanic/Latino as an ethnic category. This table excludes Latinos from the racial categories and assigns them to a separate category. Hispanics/Latinos may be of any race.
Race / Ethnicity (NH = Non-Hispanic)	Pop 2010	Pop 2020	% 2010	% 2020
White alone (NH)	155	112	47.11%	32.94%
Black or African American alone (NH)	0	0	0.00%	0.00%
Native American or Alaska Native alone (NH)	1	1	0.30%	0.29%
Asian alone (NH)	1	5	0.30%	1.47%
Native Hawaiian or Pacific Islander alone (NH)	0	0	0.00%	0.00%
Other race alone (NH)	0	3	0.00%	0.88%
Mixed race or Multiracial (NH)	3	4	0.91%	1.18%
Hispanic or Latino (any race)	169	215	51.37%	63.24%
Total	329	340	100.00%	100.00%

=== 2020 census ===
In the 2020 census, there were 340 people, 41 families, and 119 housing units. The racial demographics of the CDP was 38.5% White, 1.4% Asian, 0.2% Native American, 50% from some other race, and 9.7% from two or more races. 63.2% of the population had Hispanic or Latino ancestry. 15.1% of the population speaks Spanish at home.
