= Orondo, Washington =

Unincorporated community in Washington, United States

Orondo
- Unincorporated Community
- Orondo, Washington
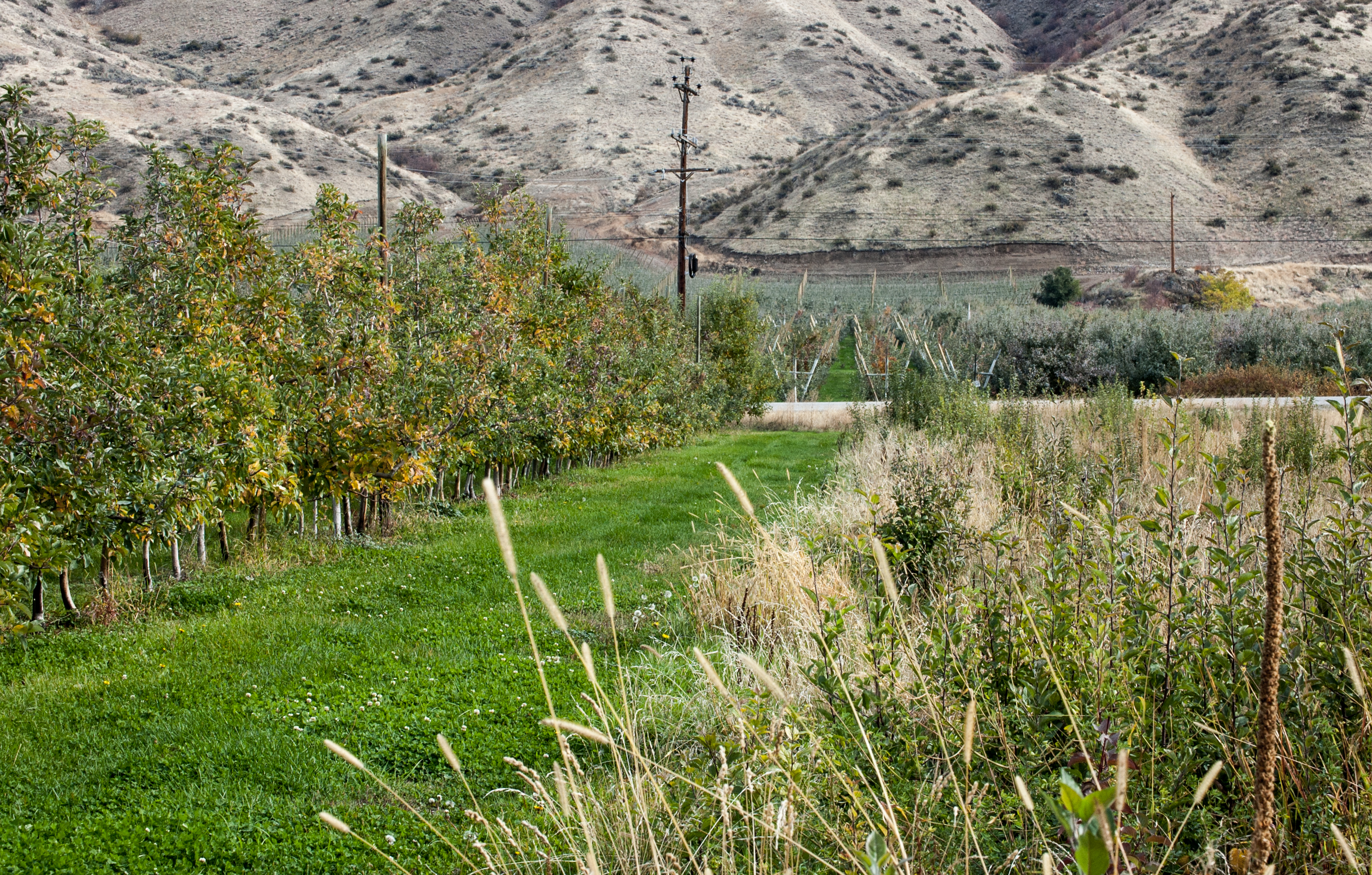
- An apple orchard in the Orondo area.
- Motto: The Town Which Held The Key
- Interactive map of Orondo
- Coordinates: 47°37′33″N 120°13′31″W
- Country: United States
- State: Washington
- County: Douglas
- Elevation: 758 ft (231 m)

Population (2010)
  - Estimate (2017): 1,995
- ZIP code: 98843
- Area code: 509

Orondo is an unincorporated community in Douglas County, Washington, United States, located alongside the eastern part of the Columbia River. It is part of the Wenatchee–East Wenatchee Metropolitan Statistical Area. The area is well known for its robust agriculture industry, and produce fruits such as apples, cherries and pears. The name was derived from a mythical Great Lake Indian and was first settled in the late 19th century by late Washington politician, John B. Smith.

The Auvil Fruit Company is located in Orondo. With the help of founder Grady Auvil, the company introduced the apple cultivar Granny Smith, thus establishing the M26 root stock and fostering quality production of Fuji Apples in Washington State.

The town supports a U.S. Post Office, an elementary school, and a multitude of fruit stands along U.S. Highway 97.

According to United States Census, the population is estimated to be 1995 with a marginal error of 338 as of 2017.

== Parks ==
Daroga State Park: A 127-acre camping park with 1.5 miles of Columbia River shoreline on the elevated edge of the desert scab-lands. First established as an orchard/ranch site in 1928, the name derived as the first letters of Auvil brother: Dave, Robert, and Grandy. A new peach was developed cataloged as the Daroga Peach. In 1981, Grady Auvil sold the property to the state of Washington and is now currently owned by the Chelan County PUD but operated by Washington State Parks.

Orondo River Park: established in 1972, the park has been a recreational site since 1976. The port of Douglas and Chelan County PUD own property within the park boundaries.

In October 2017, the port of Douglas has asked the Chelan PUD take over operation and ownership of the facility due to the park losing money for years.

== Education ==
The town has one school district that operates the preschool, elementary and middle school.

The district is a "non-high" school district and has no high school opportunity in the town. As a result, the neighboring schools provide high school education for Freshman through Senior students.

== History ==
1887, the townsite of Orondo was established by J.B Smith.

1888, Smith donated a plot of land to attract more settlers to Orondo

== Climate ==
Climate data for Orondo, Washington
Month	Jan	Feb	Mar	Apr	May	Jun	Jul	Aug	Sep	Oct	Nov	Dec	Year
Record high °F (°C)	55 (13)	62 (17)	76 (24)	82 (28)	97 (36)	102 (39)	107 (42)	103 (39)	100 (38)	87 (31)	70 (21)	60 (16)	107 (42)
Mean daily maximum °F (°C)	35 (2)	42 (6)	54 (12)	63 (17)	71 (22)	78 (26)	86 (30)	87 (31)	78 (26)	63 (17)	45 (7)	34 (1)	61 (16)
Mean daily minimum °F (°C)	22 (−6)	25 (−4)	31 (−1)	36 (2)	42 (6)	48 (9)	53 (12)	53 (12)	46 (8)	37 (3)	29 (−2)	21 (−6)	37 (3)
Record low °F (°C)	−13 (−25)	−9 (−23)	14 (−10)	26 (−3)	30 (−1)	33 (1)	42 (6)	37 (3)	27 (−3)	11 (−12)	2 (−17)	−16 (−27)	−16 (−27)
Average precipitation inches (mm)	1.82 (46)	1.37 (35)	1.10 (28)	0.68 (17)	0.90 (23)	0.83 (21)	0.32 (8.1)	0.26 (6.6)	0.41 (10)	0.96 (24)	2.14 (54)	2.39 (61)	13.18 (333.7)

== Literature ==
In East of the Mountains (1999), Orondo is mentioned when one of two Spanish speaking brothers on a bus asked Catherine Donnelly, where they are and wondering how long till they arrive at Orondo. The brothers then mentioned that they work at Orondo picking apples.

Orondo is mentioned by a band of outlaws in the second novel by author D.F Bissonnette "The Smoke Road" (2017), while they flee from the US Cavalry after a spate of crimes along the Columbia River during the Yakima Wars.
