= Lake Chelan =

Lake in Chelan County, Washington, United States

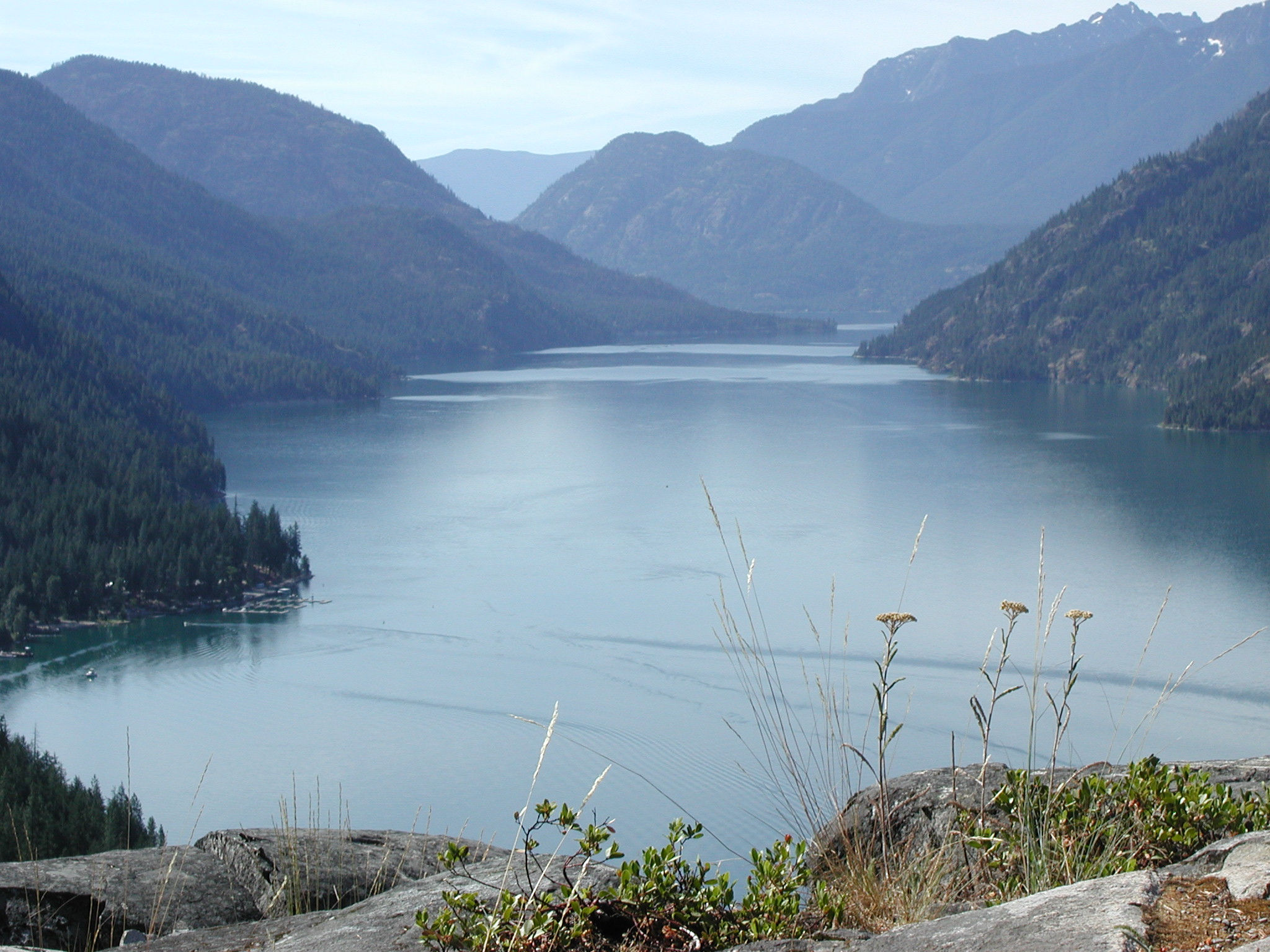
- Lake Chelan with Stehekin on the lower left

- Location within Washington (state) Location within the United States
- Location: Chelan County, Washington, United States
- Coordinates: 47°50′28″N 120°02′47″W
- Type: Glacially overdeepened lake
- Primary inflows: Stehekin River, Railroad Creek
- Primary outflows: Chelan River
- Catchment area: 924 sq mi (2,390 km^{2})
- Basin countries: United States
- Max. length: 50.5 mi (81.3 km)
- Surface area: 52.1 sq mi (135 km^{2})
- Average depth: 474 ft (144 m)
- Max. depth: 1,486 ft (453 m)
- Water volume: 4.66 cu mi (19.4 km^{3})
- Residence time: 10.6 years
- Shore length^{1}: 109.2 mi (175.7 km)
- Surface elevation: 1,100 ft (340 m)
- Settlements: see Cities
- ^{1} Shore length is not a well-defined measure.

Lake Chelan (/ʃəˈlæn/ shə-LAN) is a narrow, 50.5 mi (81.3 km) long lake in Chelan County, north-central Washington state, U.S. It is an overdeepened lake and resembles a fjord, with an average width of 1.3 mi (2.1 km). Near its upper end, the lake surface lies more than 6,600 ft (2,000 m) below peaks less than 3 mi (4.8 km) away. Before 1927, Lake Chelan was the largest natural lake in the state, in terms of both surface area and water volume. Upon the completion of Lake Chelan Dam in 1927, the elevation of the lake was increased by 21 ft (6.4 m) to its present maximum-capacity elevation of 1,100 ft (340 m).

With a maximum depth of 1,486 ft (453 m), Lake Chelan is the third deepest lake in the United States behind Crater Lake, the deepest, and Lake Tahoe, the second deepest. Because of overdeepening, the sides of this lake drop steeply to its bottom. The deepest part of Lake Chelan lies as much as 436 ft (133 m) below sea level. In places, the bedrock floor of the valley occupied by Lake Chelan, which is buried by Pleistocene glacial and lacustrine sediments, lies at least 1,529 ft (466 m) below sea level. Two communities lie on the southern end of the lake, and a third sits at the far north end, providing a gateway to North Cascades National Park.

== Hydrology ==
On an annual basis, an average of 2,200 cubic feet per second (62 m^{3}/s) flow into the lake. Approximately 75% of the water that flows into the lake comes from two tributaries. The Stehekin River alone contributes 65% of all water to Lake Chelan, averaging 1,401 cu ft/s (39.7 m^{3}/s) annually. The other major tributary, Railroad Creek, averages 202 cu ft/s (5.7 m^{3}/s) annually. The remaining water is added via a number of smaller tributaries as well as direct rain and snowfall.

With a maximum depth of 1,486 feet (453 m), Lake Chelan is the third deepest lake in the United States, and the 25th deepest in the world. At its deepest, the lake bottom is 388 feet (118 m) below sea level. The total watershed of the lake is 924 square miles (2,390 km^{2}) More than 90% of the watershed is forested land. The remainder of the basin is composed of the lake itself (5.6%) and agriculture (3.5%).

== Geology ==
The fjord-like topography of the Lake Chelan valley results from repeated glacial erosion and deposition (maybe nine or ten times) during the Pleistocene Period. The last episode of glacial erosion and deposition in the basin occurred during the Last Glacial Maximum about 21,000 years ago. At that time, in the upper Similkameen River valley of British Columbia, the Skagit Lobe split from the Okanogan Lobe of the Cordilleran ice sheet and advanced south into the Skagit River drainage. Skagit ice passed through Fisher and Rainy passes, and down Bridge Creek into the Lake Chelan valley. The glacial lobe flowed down the Lake Chelan valley until meeting glacial ice of the main Okanogan Lobe advancing up the valley from the Columbia River drainage near Manson. The deposits of the northwestward advancing Okanagan lobe are characterized by large, basalt glacial erratics. As the Skagit Lobe during the Last Glacial Maximum and glacial lobes during older glaciations flowed to the southeast down the Lake Chelan valley, they excavated the deep glacial trough that is now occupied by Lake Chelan. The depth of the Lucerne Basin and the elevation of glacial till and moraines and glacier-scoured bedrock on the walls of the overdeepened Lake Chelan valley indicates that the thickness of the Skagit Lobe was over 1 mi (1.6 km).

=== Basins ===
Lake Chelan is composed of two basins. The lower basin, Wapato, is shallower and approximately a fourth the total length of the lake. The upper basin, Lucerne, is much deeper and extends for the remainder of the length of the lake. The two basins are separated by a sill rising to within 122 ft (37 m) of the surface, at a point known as the narrows, at which the lake is only 0.35 miles (0.56 km) wide.

The lower basin, Wapato, reaches a maximum depth of only 400 feet (120 m). About 600 feet (180 m) of glacial sediment and rockslide deposits rest on top of the bedrock. This section of the lake is 12 miles (19 km) long, and has an average depth of 190 feet (58 m). Due to the relatively modest size of this basin, water resides in this basin for only 0.8 years, compared to 10 for Lucerne Basin. The upper Lucerne basin is 38 miles (61 km) long with an average depth of 1,148 feet (350 m) and thus by far the larger of the two basins. It is in this part of the lake that the maximum depth of 1,486 feet (453 m) is found. Lucerne basin contains 92% of the water in Lake Chelan and 74% of the surface area, leaving Wapato with only 8% of the total volume of water and 26% of the surface area. The upper basin of Lake Chelan is surrounded by more mountainous terrain, resulting in few beaches along the shoreline. Approximately 50 miles (80 km) of the shoreline of this basin are in National Forest lands, and 12 miles (19 km) in National Park lands.

== Natural history ==
=== Climate ===
The climate of Lake Chelan's watershed is varied. From the southern end of the lake in the rain shadow of the Cascade Range, to the northern tip of the lake located in the eastern Cascades, the climate of Lake Chelan's watershed is as diverse as the lake is long. The south end's weather is notably dry, with Chelan averaging only 11.4 inches (29 cm) of rain per year, along with 21.8 inches (55 cm) of snow. Stehekin receives an average of 35.5 inches (90 cm) of rain per year, and 122.5 inches (311 cm) of snow. Other than precipitation trends, the climates are remarkably similar. Both locations average around 60 °F (16 °C) for a high, and 40 °F (4 °C) for a low throughout the course of the year.

Climate data for Chelan, Washington (south end of lake) (1991–2020 normals, extremes since 1891)
| Month | Jan | Feb | Mar | Apr | May | Jun | Jul | Aug | Sep | Oct | Nov | Dec | Year |
|---|---|---|---|---|---|---|---|---|---|---|---|---|---|
| Record high °F (°C) | 62 (17) | 63 (17) | 74 (23) | 88 (31) | 98 (37) | 111 (44) | 109 (43) | 106 (41) | 97 (36) | 88 (31) | 72 (22) | 65 (18) | 111 (44) |
| Mean maximum °F (°C) | 48 (9) | 52 (11) | 63 (17) | 75 (24) | 86 (30) | 90 (32) | 99 (37) | 99 (37) | 89 (32) | 75 (24) | 58 (14) | 48 (9) | 100 (38) |
| Mean daily maximum °F (°C) | 34.3 (1.3) | 41.7 (5.4) | 51.9 (11.1) | 62.1 (16.7) | 71.9 (22.2) | 77.9 (25.5) | 86.6 (30.3) | 87.0 (30.6) | 77.2 (25.1) | 62.2 (16.8) | 45.7 (7.6) | 34.9 (1.6) | 61.1 (16.2) |
| Daily mean °F (°C) | 28.0 (−2.2) | 33.0 (0.6) | 41.1 (5.1) | 49.8 (9.9) | 59.0 (15.0) | 65.4 (18.6) | 72.8 (22.7) | 72.5 (22.5) | 63.2 (17.3) | 50.5 (10.3) | 37.6 (3.1) | 28.7 (−1.8) | 50.1 (10.1) |
| Mean daily minimum °F (°C) | 21.6 (−5.8) | 24.3 (−4.3) | 30.3 (−0.9) | 37.5 (3.1) | 46.2 (7.9) | 53.0 (11.7) | 59.1 (15.1) | 58.1 (14.5) | 49.2 (9.6) | 38.8 (3.8) | 29.5 (−1.4) | 22.6 (−5.2) | 39.2 (4.0) |
| Mean minimum °F (°C) | 11 (−12) | 16 (−9) | 24 (−4) | 32 (0) | 39 (4) | 47 (8) | 52 (11) | 52 (11) | 42 (6) | 30 (−1) | 21 (−6) | 14 (−10) | 7 (−14) |
| Record low °F (°C) | −18 (−28) | −15 (−26) | 4 (−16) | 21 (−6) | 28 (−2) | 33 (1) | 35 (2) | 42 (6) | 26 (−3) | 3 (−16) | −3 (−19) | −18 (−28) | −18 (−28) |
| Average precipitation inches (mm) | 1.52 (39) | 1.22 (31) | 1.09 (28) | 0.75 (19) | 1.05 (27) | 0.87 (22) | 0.42 (11) | 0.32 (8.1) | 0.34 (8.6) | 1.04 (26) | 1.51 (38) | 1.83 (46) | 11.96 (303.7) |
| Average snowfall inches (cm) | 7.7 (20) | 2.0 (5.1) | 0.7 (1.8) | 0.0 (0.0) | 0.0 (0.0) | 0.0 (0.0) | 0.0 (0.0) | 0.0 (0.0) | 0.0 (0.0) | 0.0 (0.0) | 1.4 (3.6) | 8.7 (22) | 20.5 (52.5) |
| Average extreme snow depth inches (cm) | 3 (7.6) | 2 (5.1) | 1 (2.5) | 0 (0) | 0 (0) | 0 (0) | 0 (0) | 0 (0) | 0 (0) | 0 (0) | 1 (2.5) | 2 (5.1) | 4 (10) |
| Average precipitation days (≥ 0.01 inch) | 10 | 7 | 7 | 5 | 6 | 5 | 3 | 2 | 2 | 6 | 9 | 9 | 71 |
Source: National Oceanic and Atmospheric Administration

Climate data for Stehekin, Washington (north end of the lake) (1991–2020 normals, extremes since 1906)
| Month | Jan | Feb | Mar | Apr | May | Jun | Jul | Aug | Sep | Oct | Nov | Dec | Year |
|---|---|---|---|---|---|---|---|---|---|---|---|---|---|
| Record high °F (°C) | 55 (13) | 59 (15) | 70 (21) | 85 (29) | 101 (38) | 103 (39) | 107 (42) | 105 (41) | 98 (37) | 88 (31) | 67 (19) | 62 (17) | 107 (42) |
| Mean maximum °F (°C) | 42 (6) | 48 (9) | 59 (15) | 74 (23) | 86 (30) | 92 (33) | 99 (37) | 98 (37) | 89 (32) | 72 (22) | 52 (11) | 42 (6) | 100 (38) |
| Mean daily maximum °F (°C) | 32.3 (0.2) | 37.8 (3.2) | 46.5 (8.1) | 57.5 (14.2) | 68.6 (20.3) | 74.4 (23.6) | 84.3 (29.1) | 83.3 (28.5) | 72.5 (22.5) | 55.8 (13.2) | 40.0 (4.4) | 32.3 (0.2) | 57.1 (13.9) |
| Daily mean °F (°C) | 28.5 (−1.9) | 31.9 (−0.1) | 38.1 (3.4) | 46.6 (8.1) | 56.2 (13.4) | 62.2 (16.8) | 70.1 (21.2) | 69.3 (20.7) | 60.2 (15.7) | 46.8 (8.2) | 35.2 (1.8) | 29.0 (−1.7) | 47.8 (8.8) |
| Mean daily minimum °F (°C) | 24.8 (−4.0) | 26.0 (−3.3) | 29.8 (−1.2) | 35.8 (2.1) | 43.8 (6.6) | 49.9 (9.9) | 55.9 (13.3) | 55.2 (12.9) | 47.8 (8.8) | 37.8 (3.2) | 30.4 (−0.9) | 25.6 (−3.6) | 38.6 (3.7) |
| Mean minimum °F (°C) | 12 (−11) | 15 (−9) | 22 (−6) | 28 (−2) | 34 (1) | 41 (5) | 47 (8) | 46 (8) | 38 (3) | 27 (−3) | 21 (−6) | 12 (−11) | 8 (−13) |
| Record low °F (°C) | −18 (−28) | −16 (−27) | −5 (−21) | 19 (−7) | 25 (−4) | 28 (−2) | 36 (2) | 30 (−1) | 22 (−6) | 16 (−9) | 0 (−18) | −11 (−24) | −18 (−28) |
| Average precipitation inches (mm) | 6.75 (171) | 3.72 (94) | 3.60 (91) | 1.44 (37) | 1.07 (27) | 0.75 (19) | 0.46 (12) | 0.49 (12) | 1.05 (27) | 3.66 (93) | 6.73 (171) | 7.16 (182) | 36.88 (936) |
| Average snowfall inches (cm) | 41.4 (105) | 18.5 (47) | 9.1 (23) | 0.2 (0.51) | 0.0 (0.0) | 0.0 (0.0) | 0.0 (0.0) | 0.0 (0.0) | 0.0 (0.0) | 0.2 (0.51) | 9.7 (25) | 50.6 (129) | 129.7 (330.02) |
| Average extreme snow depth inches (cm) | 36 (91) | 33 (84) | 24 (61) | 6 (15) | 0 (0) | 0 (0) | 0 (0) | 0 (0) | 0 (0) | 0 (0) | 6 (15) | 27 (69) | 41 (100) |
| Average precipitation days (≥ 0.01 in) | 17 | 11 | 11 | 8 | 6 | 6 | 3 | 3 | 6 | 11 | 16 | 16 | 114 |
| Average snowy days (≥ 0.01 in) | 11 | 5 | 3 | 0 | 0 | 0 | 0 | 0 | 0 | 0 | 3 | 11 | 33 |
Source: NOAA

== History ==
=== Etymology ===
The name Chelan is a Salish Indigenous word, "Tsi - Laan," meaning 'Deep Water'.

=== Cities ===
Due to the isolated nature of Lake Chelan, especially at its northern reaches, there is not a large population that resides along the shore. The City of Chelan, which had 4,222 residents at the 2020 census, is currently the only incorporated city situated along the lake shore. The city is located at the southern terminus of the lake, adjacent to the Lake Chelan Dam and the Chelan River outflow. The census-designated place of Manson, which had 1,523 residents in 2020, is also located at the southern end of the lake. The unincorporated community of Stehekin, with approximately 75 residents, is located at the northern terminus of the lake, adjacent to the Stehekin River inflow. At the mouth of the Railroad Creek sits Lucerne, a small community of private cabins served by commercial boats. Lucerne is also the primary gateway to the community of Holden Village, a Lutheran retreat center located 11 mi (18 km) inland from the lake. With approximately 50 long-term residents, Holden includes one of the few remaining public K-12 two-room schools in the contiguous United States.

== Economy ==
=== Fishing ===
Fishing is a popular recreational activity on Lake Chelan. The following fish are or were native to the lake: Bull Trout, Westslope cutthroat trout, Largescale sucker, Longnose sucker, Bridgelip sucker, Northern pikeminnow, Peamouth, Redside shiner, Mountain whitefish, Pygmy whitefish.

In addition to these native species, six species have been introduced to the lake, primarily for sport fishing purposes: Yellowstone cutthroat trout, Rainbow trout, Kokanee, Brook trout, Chinook salmon, Lake trout

==== State records ====
In 2013, a 35.63 lb (16.16 kg) Lake Trout was caught, setting the state record.

=== Winemaking ===
The Lake Chelan AVA surrounds the southernmost 12 miles of Lake Chelan. A subzone of the larger Columbia Valley AVA, the Lake Chelan AVA is home to 31 tasting rooms.

== Protected lands ==
At the north end of the lake, surrounding the town of Stehekin, is Lake Chelan National Recreation Area (NRA). Bordering the Lake Chelan NRA is the Lake Chelan-Sawtooth Wilderness. The Wenatchee National Forest surrounds much of the lake on either side. Two state parks are located on the southern edge, not far from the city of Chelan. These state parks are Twenty-Five Mile Creek State Park and Lake Chelan State Park.

In addition to the protected land located directly on the shores of Lake Chelan, Stehekin serves not only as a gateway to the Lake Chelan NRA, but also to the rest of the North Cascades National Park Complex, Stephen Mather Wilderness, and adjacent National Forest Wilderness Areas. Approximately 87% of the Lake Chelan watershed is owned by either federal, state, or local entities, with the rest in private ownership.

== Gallery ==
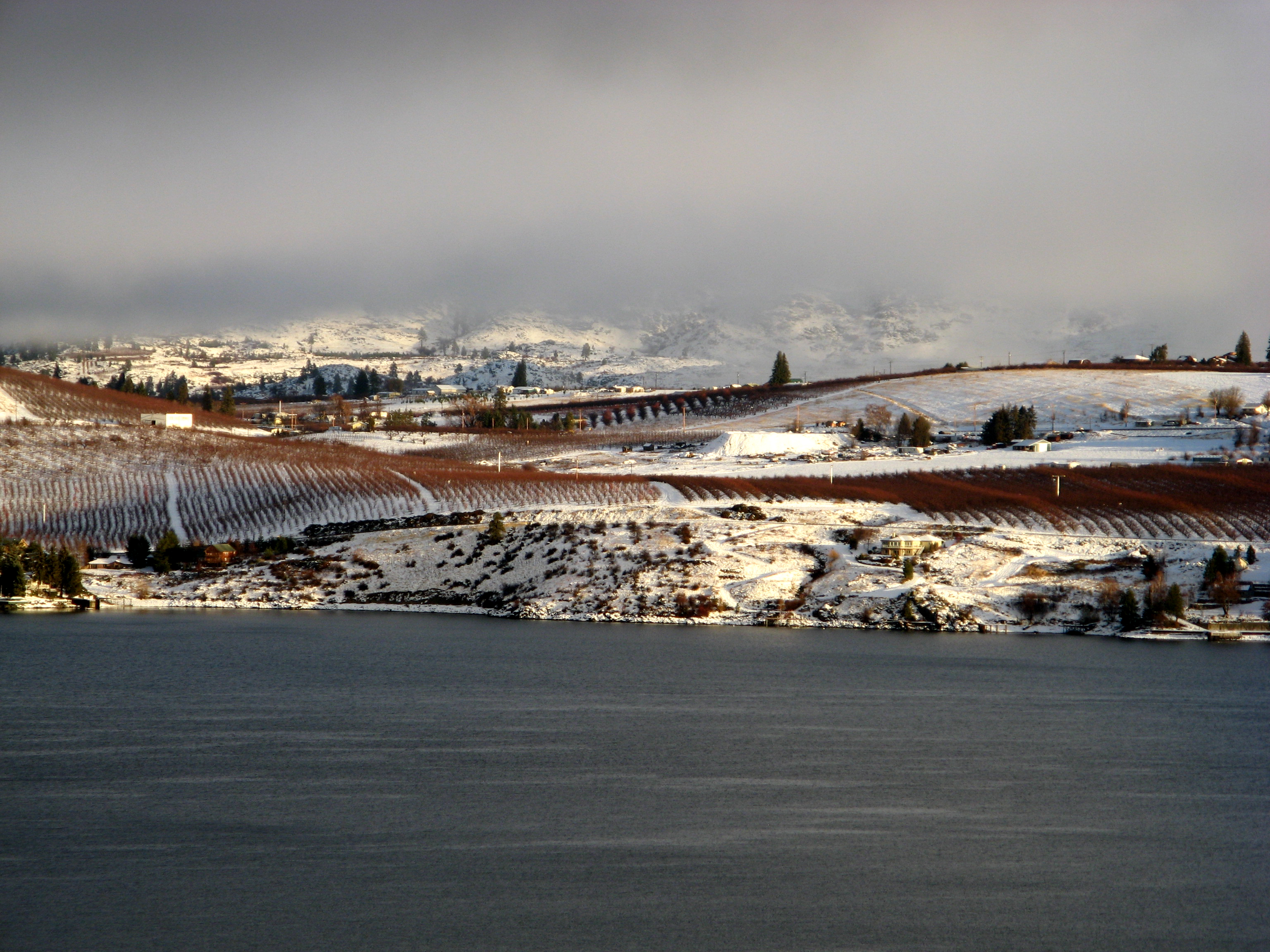
View of Manson orchards from the south shore of Lake Chelan

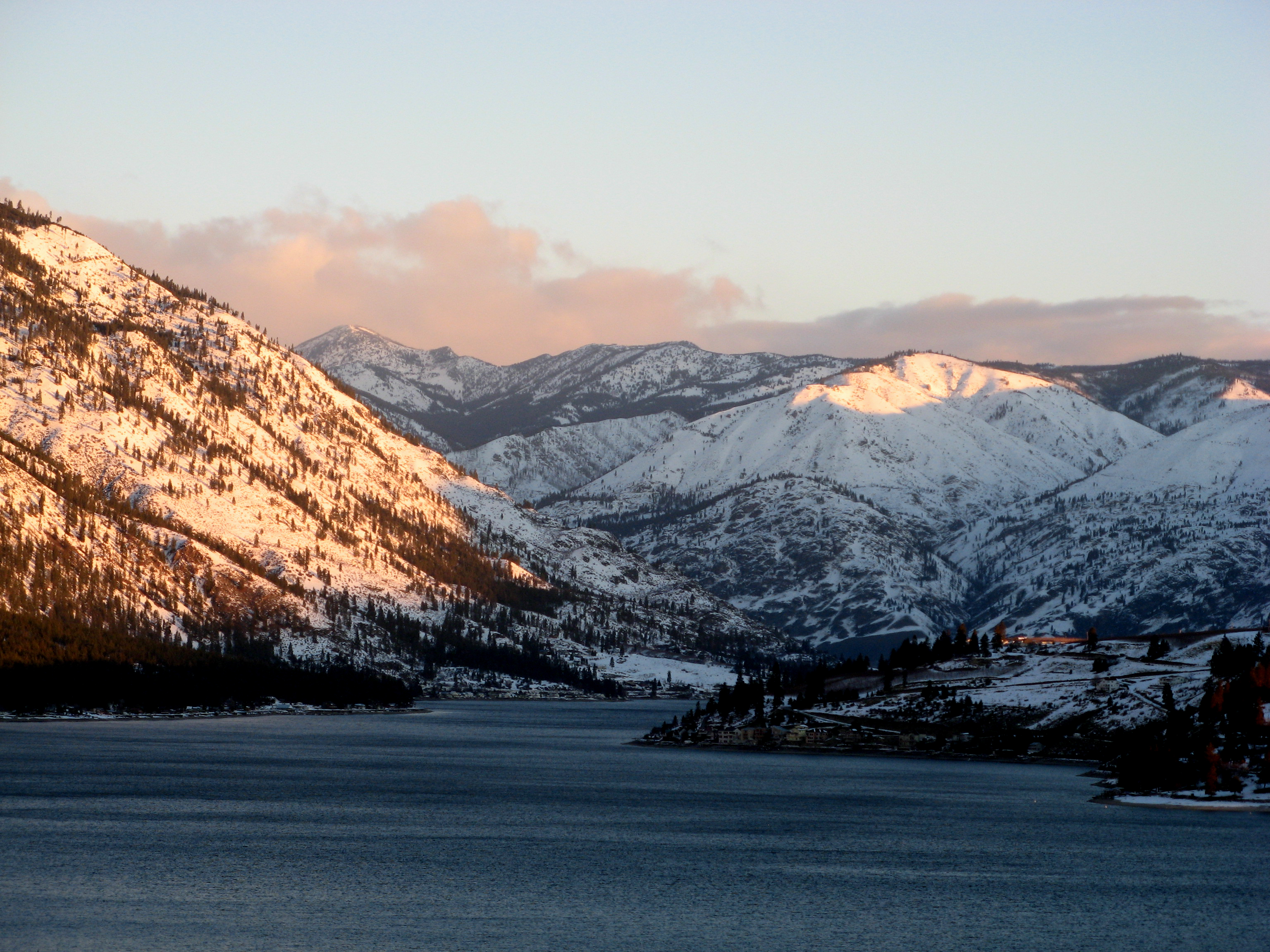
View uplake from the south shore of Lake Chelan

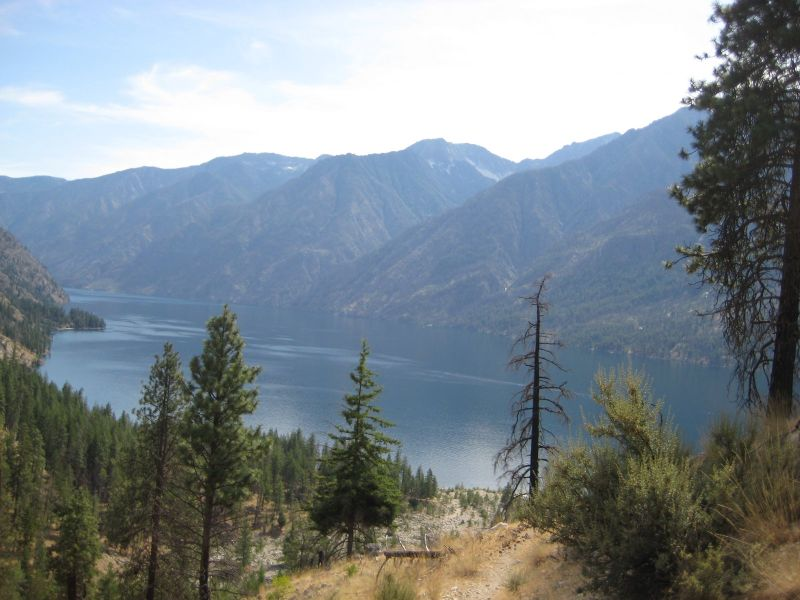
View of Lake Chelan from Lakeshore trail, near Stehekin

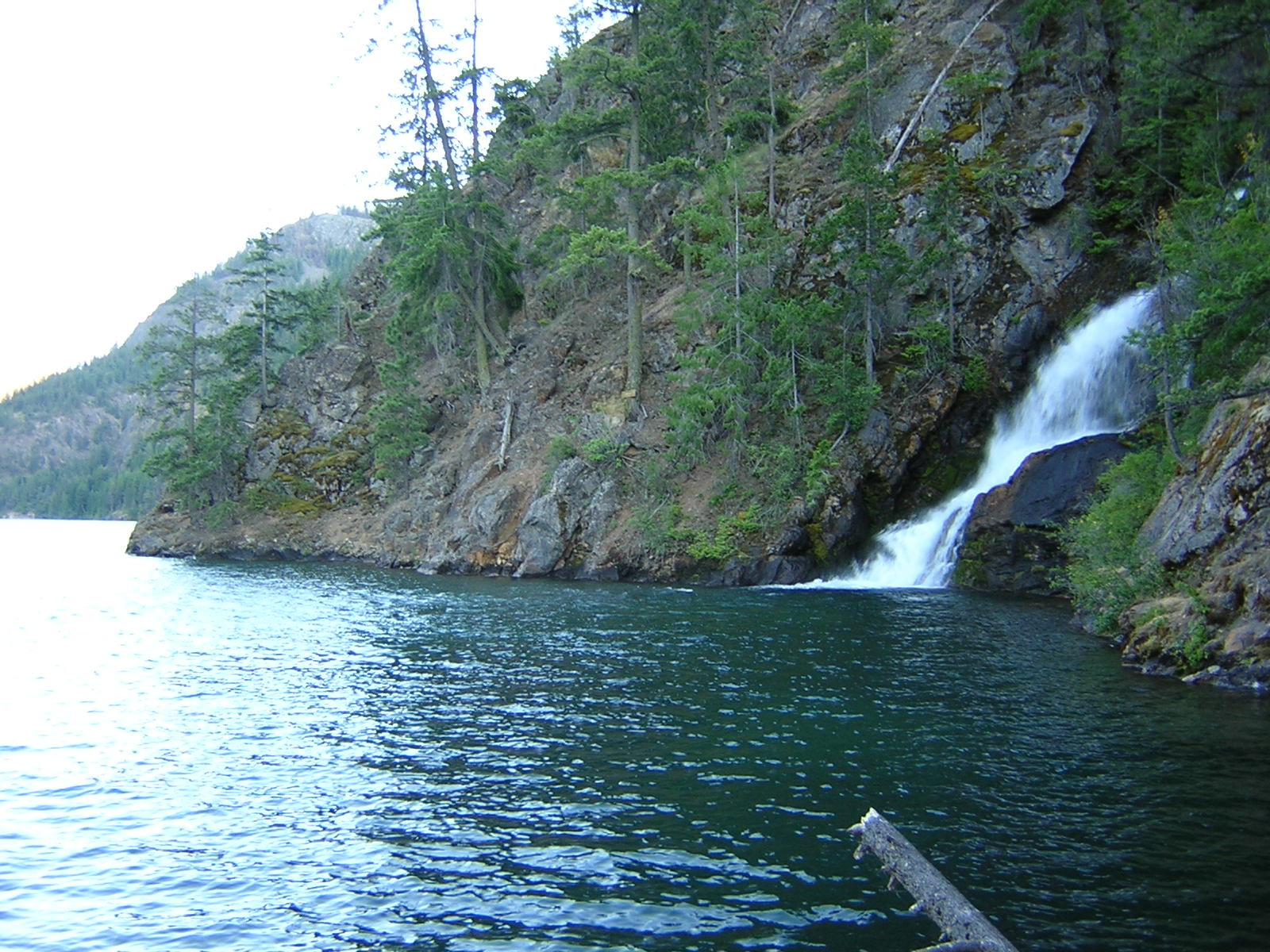
Domke Falls is the best known waterfall that drops into the lake

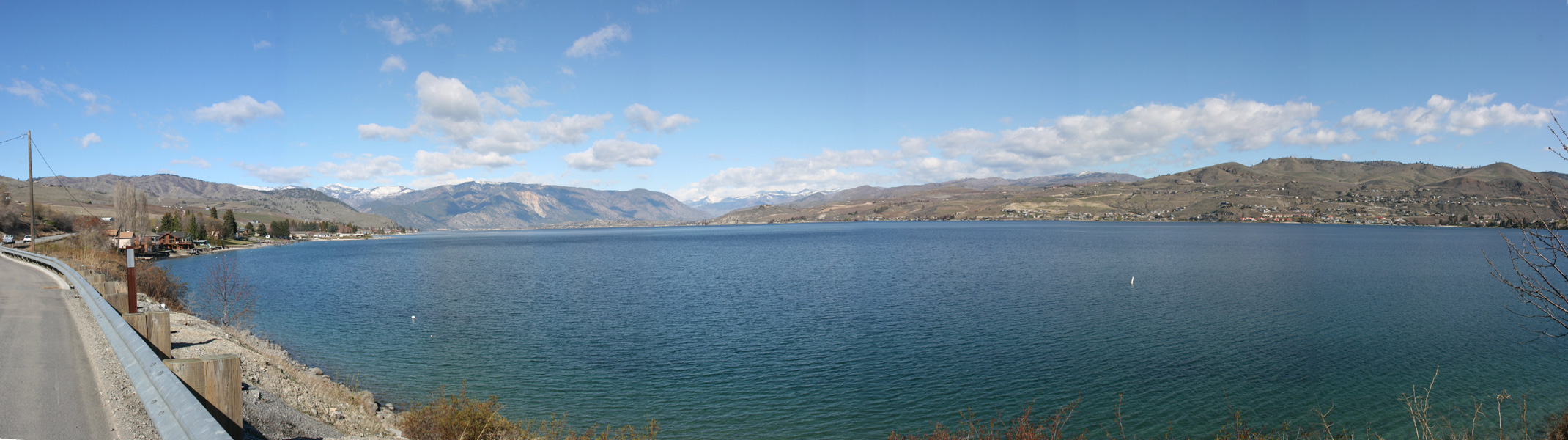
Lake Chelan as seen from the southern shore off U.S. Highway 97A

== See also ==
- Uno Peak Fire
