= Rock Island Dam =

Dam on Columbia River, United States

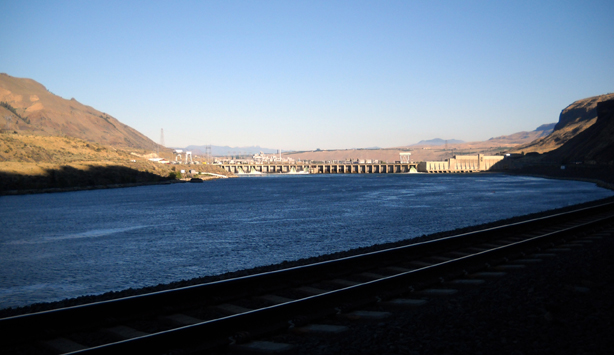
- Rock Island Dam from Washington SR 28
- Interactive map of Rock Island Dam
- Location: Chelan / Douglas counties, Washington
- Coordinates: 47.342155°N 120.094773°W
- Construction began: 1930
- Opening date: 1933
- Owner: Chelan County Public Utility District

Dam and spillways
- Impounds: Columbia River
- Spillways: 31

Reservoir
- Creates: Rock Island Pool
- Total capacity: 131,000 acre⋅ft (0.162 km^{3})

Power Station
- Turbines: 19 Total; 8x 51.3 MW; 6x 22.5 MW; 4x 20.7 MW; 1x 1.2 MW
- Installed capacity: 629.4 MW
- Annual generation: 2,025.294 GWh

Rock Island Dam is a hydroelectric dam on the Columbia River, in the U.S. state of Washington. Built from 1929 to 1933, it was the first dam to span the Columbia. It is located near the geographical center of Washington, about 12 miles (19 km) downstream from the city of Wenatchee. By river, the dam is 235 miles (378 km) south of the Canada–U.S. border and 453 miles (729 km) above the mouth of the river at Astoria, Oregon. The dam's reservoir is called Rock Island Pool.

== Overview ==
Rock Island Dam is constructed on Columbia River basalt similar to that which is exposed on the cliffs near the dam. These columnar basalts were formed from lava flows during the mid- to late-Miocene Epoch, some 14 to 16 million years ago. The rock is strong and durable and provides a very stable foundation for the structure.

Columbia River stream flows at the dam averaged 73,700 cubic feet per second (2090 m³/s), a decrease of 37% from 2000 and 63% of the 20 year average of 116,700 cubic feet per second (3305 m³/s).

== History ==
In 1927, the Rock Island site came to the attention of the Stone & Webster Engineering Corporation, a Boston-based holding company that managed the Puget Sound Power & Light Company. The site was recognized for its potential to provide power for the growing electrical load in the state. On December 13, 1928, an application was filed with the Federal Power Commission for a preliminary permit to investigate the site. This was followed by a license application submitted in June 1929 by the Washington Electric Company, a subsidiary construction corporation of Puget Sound Power & Light (now part of Puget Sound Energy). The license was authorized on October 16, 1929, and on January 14, 1930, at the beginning of the Great Depression, construction started on the first dam to span the Columbia River.

The development of the dam took place over a period of 50 years. There were three main construction periods, each taking place about 20 years apart as the need for low-cost hydroelectric power was paramount in the region. Development began in January 1930, and the dam, powerhouse, and first four operating units were turned over to Puget by Stone & Webster on February 1, 1933. Work on completion of the dam, powerhouse expansion and installation of six additional units by Chelan County PUD began in July 1951 and was completed on April 30, 1953. Construction of a second powerhouse, with its eight turbine generators located on the west bank of the river, began on August 4, 1974. The second powerhouse was placed in commercial operation on August 31, 1979.

== Electricity generation ==
The Rock Island Hydro Project generated 1,900 gigawatt-hours of electricity in 2001 — 70% of its 2000 output. Over the past 10 years the project has averaged 2,600 gigawatt-hours per year.

During 2001, Rock Island's Second Powerhouse produced 1,800 gigawatt-hours of power, representing 95% of total generation for the year. The 10 year average generation for the project is 383 gigawatt-hours.

Under the terms of the Rock Island Settlement Agreement, the Chelan County Public Utility District provides spill to improve the survival rate of juvenile salmon passing the dam. During the spring, 1,570,495 acre-feet (1.937177×10^{9} m^{3}) of water was spilled during a 59-day period between April 20 and June 17. This resulted in 73,427 megawatt-hours of foregone generation valued at $13.4 million.

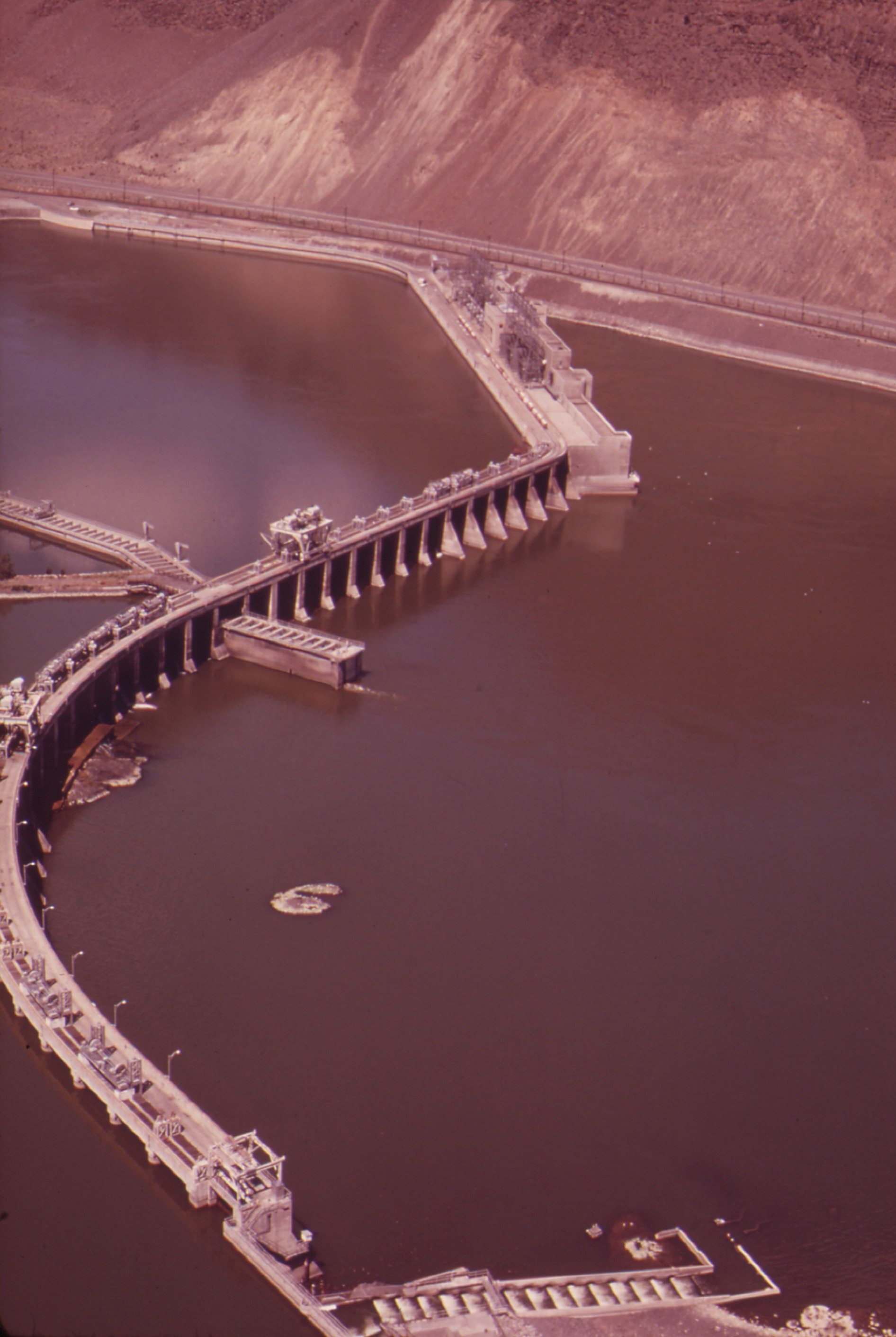
Aerial view of the dam in June 1973.

Generator	Nameplate Capacity (MW)
U-1	51.3
U-2	51.3
U-3	51.3
U-4	51.3
U-5	51.3
U-6	51.3
U-7	51.3
U-8	51.3
B-1	20.7
B-2	20.7
B-3	20.7
B-4	20.7
B-5	22.5
B-6	22.5
B-7	22.5
B-8	22.5
B-9	22.5
B-10	22.5
A	1.2
Total	629.4

== See also ==
- List of dams in the Columbia River watershed
