= Lake Entiat =

- Rocky Reach Reservoir
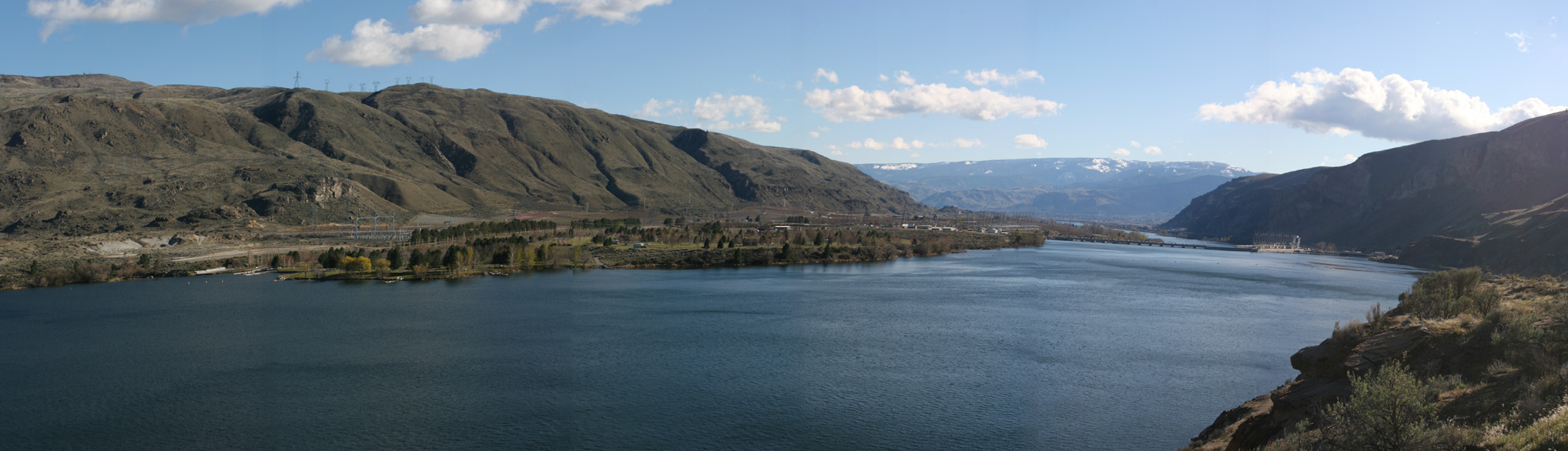

- Location within Washington (state) Location within the United States
- Location: Chelan / Douglas counties, Washington
- Coordinates: 47°31′59″N 120°17′39″W
- Type: reservoir
- Primary inflows: Columbia River
- Primary outflows: Columbia River
- Basin countries: United States
- Surface elevation: 709 ft (216 m)

Lake Entiat (also known as Rocky Reach Reservoir) is a reservoir between Chelan County and Douglas County in North Central Washington, USA, that is formed above Rocky Reach Dam (built 1962), a hydroelectric dam on the Columbia River. The reservoir is 17 mi (27 km) north of Wenatchee and stretches upstream to the Wells Dam. Lincoln Rock State Park is on its south shore.

== Turtle Rock Island ==
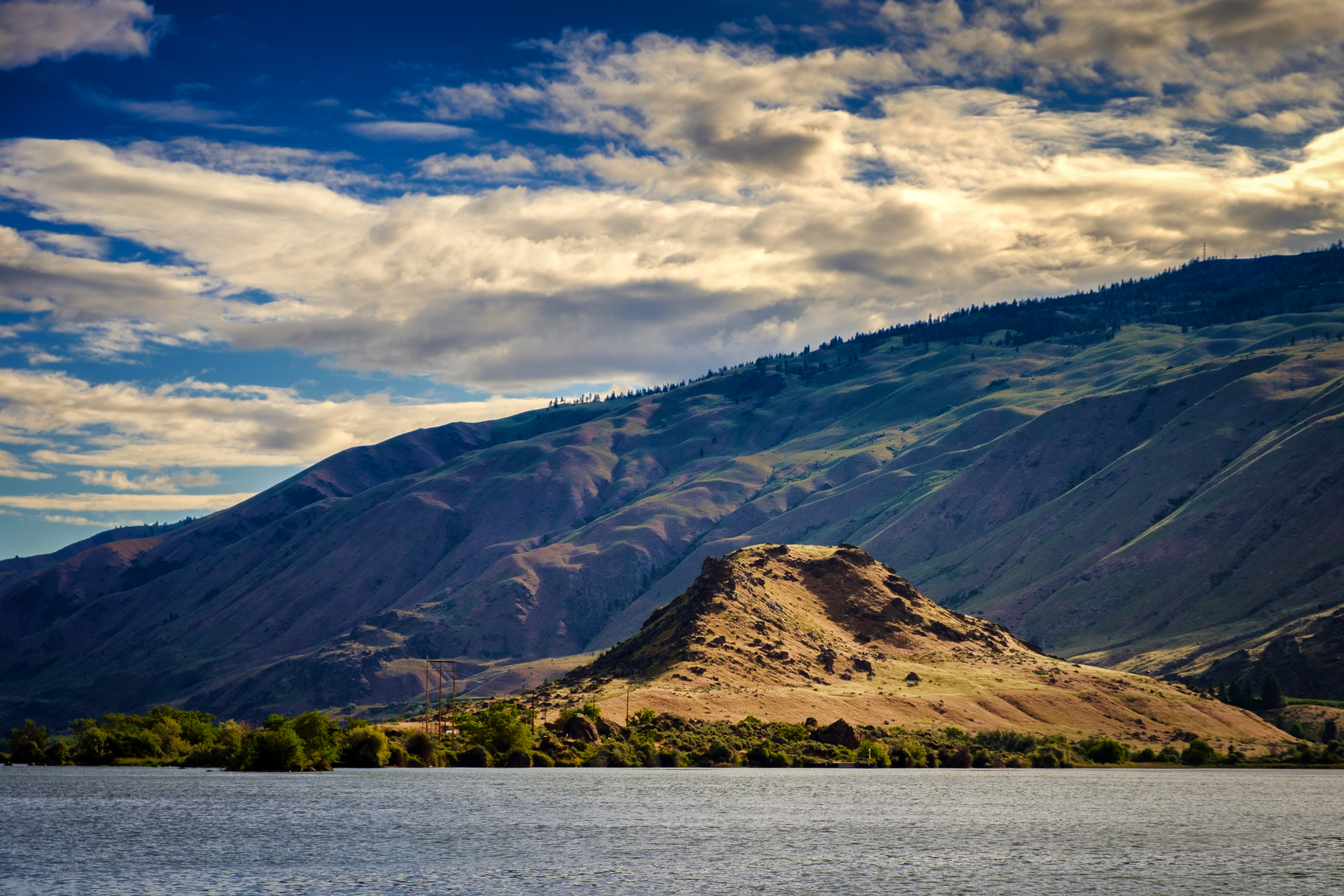
Turtle Rock Island, Lake Entiat, Washington

A prominent feature in Lake Entiat is the 150-acre Turtle Rock Island, located northeast of Lincoln Rock State Park. Originally part of the mainland on the south bank of the Columbia, this rocky outcrop became an island when the lake formed. U.S. Highway 2 formerly ran through the area that became the island, and remnants of the road may still be seen in aerial photos. The island is now a nature preserve and fish hatchery, with access only by boat.
