= Chelan River =

- Location of the mouth of the Chelan River in Washington Chelan River (the United States)

Location
- Country: United States
- State: Washington
- County: Chelan
- City: Chelan

Physical characteristics
- Source: Lake Chelan
  - coordinates: 47°50′5″N 120°0′43″W
  - elevation: 1,100 ft (340 m)
- Mouth: Columbia River
  - coordinates: 47°48′32″N 119°59′3″W
  - elevation: 712 ft (217 m)
- Length: 4.1 mi (6.6 km)
- Basin size: 924 sq mi (2,390 km^{2})
- Discharge
  - location: mouth
  - average: 2,042 cu ft/s (57.8 m^{3}/s)
  - minimum: 0 cu ft/s (0 m^{3}/s)
  - maximum: 18,400 cu ft/s (520 m^{3}/s)

The Chelan River is a tributary of the Columbia River, in the U.S. state of Washington. Just 4.1 miles (6.6 km) long, it is the shortest river in Washington. Lake Chelan Dam is located at the river's source: the outlet of Lake Chelan. Nearly the entire river's flow is diverted to the Lake Chelan Powerhouse, 3.9 miles (6.3 km) downstream near the river's mouth. Thus the Chelan River is almost always dry. Statistics on the streamflow are taken at the tailrace of the powerhouse, measuring the water that would flow through the river were it not diverted, although not including small tributaries, including Daybreak Canyon, that join the Chelan riverbed from the Lake Chelan Dam to the canal outlet.

== Course ==
The Chelan River originates at the outlet of Lake Chelan, in the city of Chelan at the southern end of the lake. Lake Chelan Dam, also in the city of Chelan, blocks the river. The dry riverbed runs 3.9 miles (6.3 km) through a steep and rocky gorge, dropping 401 feet (122 m) before reaching the Columbia River near the community of Chelan Falls. Only the first short section of the river between Lake Chelan and Lake Chelan Dam is filled with water. The rest is called the "bypassed reach".

The Lake Chelan Powerhouse is located adjacent to the river's former mouth. Diverted water is dropped through hydroelectric turbines and released into the Columbia River at Columbia river mile 503.3 (810 km). The tailrace is essentially an arm of the Columbia River with no gradient due to the impoundment of the Columbia by Rocky Reach Dam.

== River modifications ==
Although Lake Chelan is a natural lake its water level and discharge via the Chelan River has been controlled by Lake Chelan Dam since construction was completed in 1927. Due to the dam, the river is nearly always dry, although sometimes water is spilled over the dam, temporarily recreating a small streamflow in the old Chelan River. The river's water is used not only for hydroelectric power but also irrigation and drinking water. In addition, during the summer the water level of Lake Chelan is maintained at a relatively high elevation for scenic and recreational purposes. Normally water flow in the dry bypassed reach occurs in spring and early summer, when snow melt raises Lake Chelan to levels requiring spill for flood control.

The river's water is diverted through a 2.2-mile (3.5 km) long power tunnel, which ends with a 401 feet (122 m) drop through turbines at the powerhouse.

Most of the Chelan River's "bypassed reach" is owned by Chelan County PUD No. 1, the utility which also owns and operates Lake Chelan Dam.

In 2009 a different release pattern from the Lake Chelan Dam has allowed the riverbed to hold water again.

== Natural history ==
Due to the steepness of the Chelan River canyon, anadromous fish were not able to migrate up the river to Lake Chelan even before the dam was built. The lake and the river's upper reach supports various non-anadromous fish species. Columbia River fish have been found in the powerhouse's tailrace.

== See also ==
- List of Washington rivers
- Tributaries of the Columbia River
