= Rocky Reach Dam =

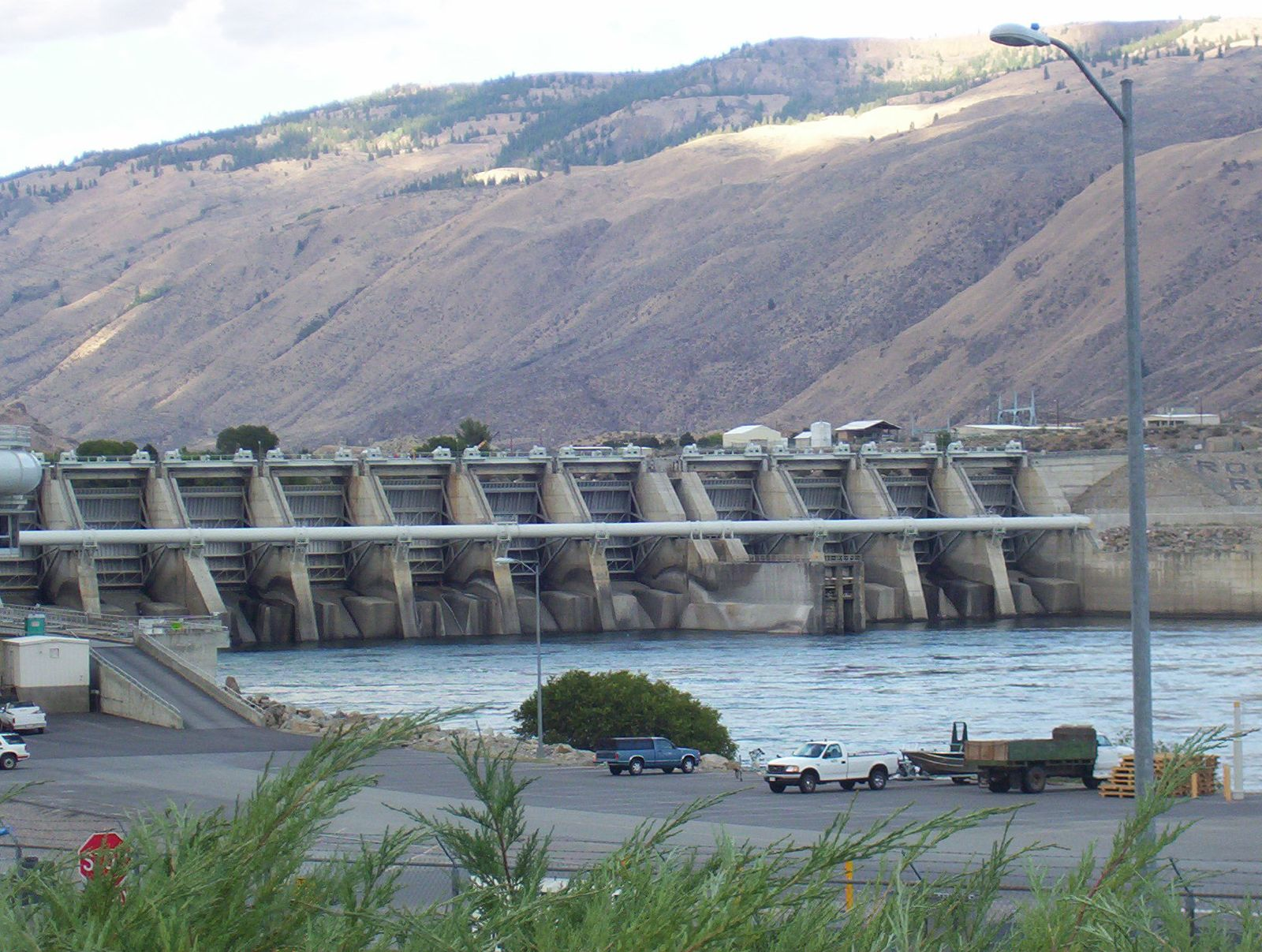
- Interactive map of Rocky Reach Dam
- Official name: Rocky Reach Hydroelectric Project
- Location: Chelan / Douglas counties, Washington
- Coordinates: 47°32′00″N 120°17′44″W
- Construction began: 1956 (Phase One); 1969 (Phase Two)
- Construction cost: $273.1 million
- Operator: Chelan County Public Utility District

Dam and spillways
- Impounds: Columbia River

Reservoir
- Creates: Lake Entiat
- Total capacity: 382,000 acre⋅ft (0.471 km^{3})

Power Station
- Turbines: 11 Total; 7x 114.0 MW; 4x 125.4 MW
- Installed capacity: 1,299.6 MW
- Annual generation: 4,901.1 GWh

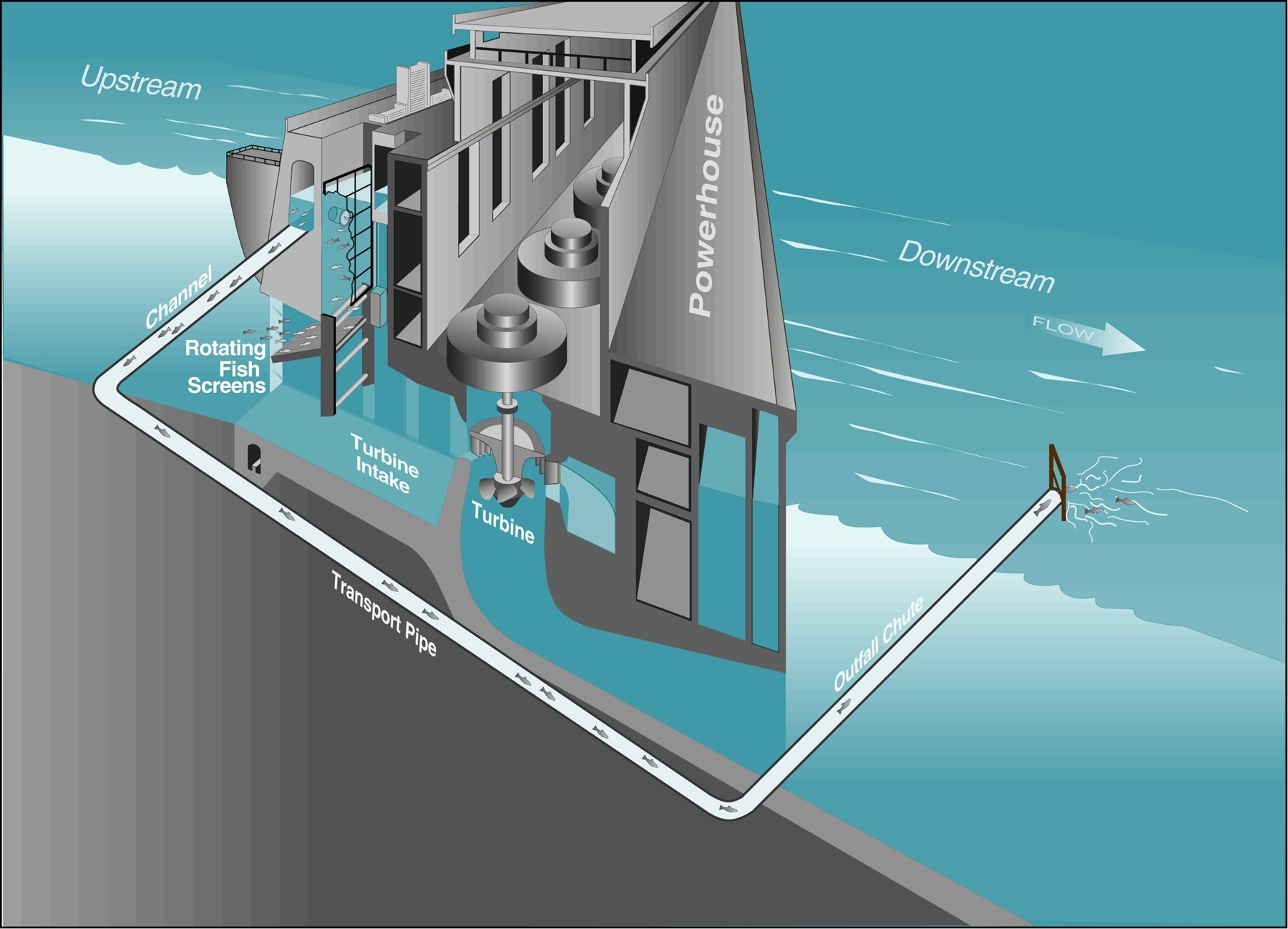
Army Corps of Engineers illustration of juvenile fish bypass

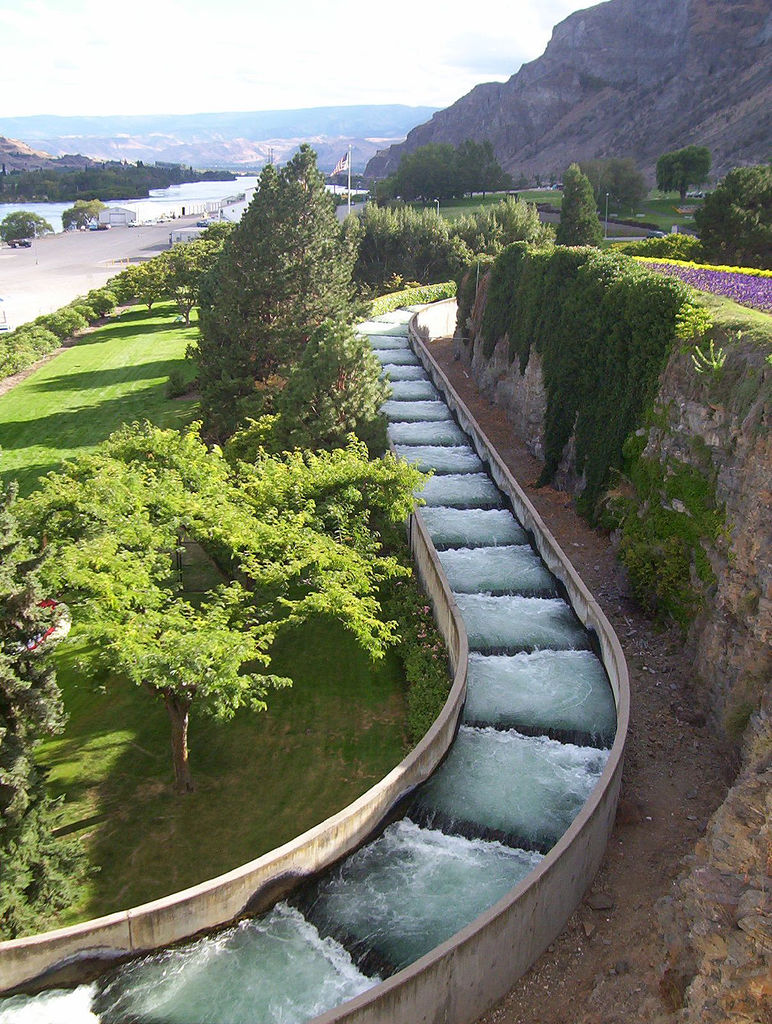
Salmon ladder below dam

Rocky Reach Dam is a run-of-the-river hydroelectric dam in the U.S. state of Washington owned and operated by Chelan County Public Utility District. It has 11 generators rated in total 1300 MW. The project is on the Columbia River in north central Washington state about seven miles (11 km) upstream from the city of Wenatchee. The dam is 473 miles (761 km) above the mouth of the Columbia. The reservoir impounded by the dam is Lake Entiat. The project provides energy for more than 7 million people throughout the Pacific Northwest.

Rocky Reach is nationally recognized for efforts to protect the environment. A first-of-its-kind juvenile fish bypass system was completed in 2003 to help young salmon and steelhead on their way to the ocean. A major powerhouse upgrade started in 1995 includes new turbines that are more fish friendly. Improvements to turbines and generators are also designed to improve efficiency and reliability.

== Tourism & recreation ==
The project is located on the Columbia River on Highway 97A, seven miles (11 km) north of Wenatchee. The visitor center shows films describing the Columbia River. The "Look a Salmon in the Eye" exhibit from (May–September) is a fish viewing room. The Powerhouse includes exhibits on the fourth floor. The Rocky Reach dam is near the Lincoln Rock State Park a short distance upriver.

== History ==
In 1934 the United States Army Corps of Engineers first reported on the hydroelectric potential of this site. By the 1950s, studies were carried out by the Chelan County P.U.D. for detail design of the project. The present site is about one mile (1.6 km) downstream of the site investigated by the Corps of Engineers, due to better conditions for foundations. A preliminary permit was issued in 1954. In 1956 construction of the powerhouse and the first seven generating units began. Four more generators were installed starting in 1969, increasing nameplate capacity to 1287 megawatts. The original project cost was US $273.1 million, financed by bonds sold by the PUD. Project costs included relocation of highways and railroad, land acquisition, and relocation of the town of Entiat. Repayment of bonds was through revenues from long-term sales contracts between Chelan County Public Utility District and local industrial and distribution customers. The facility has been re-licensed until 2052.

In 2009, Season 5, Episode 17 of Dirty Jobs with Mike Rowe was filmed at the project.

== Hydroelectric power capacity ==
The powerhouse is equipped with seven Westinghouse generators and four Allis-Chalmers generators. The turbines are adjustable blade Kaplan type to allow for efficient production of energy at varying water levels. Water flows through each of the first seven turbines at a rate of 116 thousand gallons per second and 145 thousand gallons per second through each of the remaining four turbines.

Generator	Nameplate Capacity (MW)	Manufacturer
C-1	114.0	Westinghouse
C-2	114.0	Westinghouse
C-3	114.0	Westinghouse
C-4	114.0	Westinghouse
C-5	114.0	Westinghouse
C-6	114.0	Westinghouse
C-7	114.0	Westinghouse
C-8	125.4	Allis-Chalmers
C-9	125.4	Allis-Chalmers
C-10	125.4	Allis-Chalmers
C-11	125.4	Allis-Chalmers
Total	1299.6	-

== See also ==
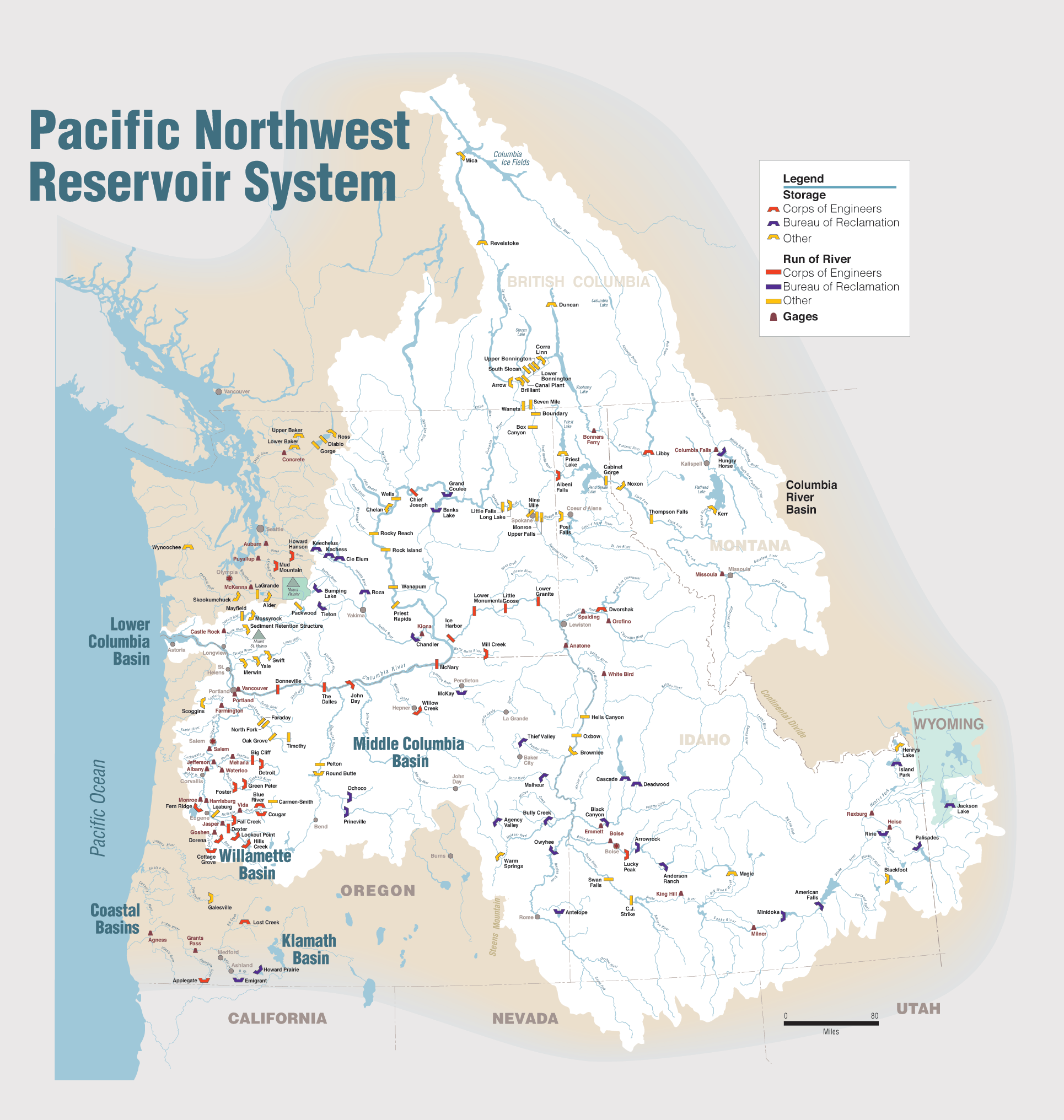
Columbia River Basin

- List of dams in the Columbia River watershed
- Hydroelectric dams on the Columbia River
- List of reservoirs and dams in the United States
