= Washington State Route 215 =

State highway in Okanogan County, Washington, US

State Route 215

- SR 215 highlighted in red

Route information
- Auxiliary route of SR 20
- Maintained by WSDOT
- Length: 6.24 mi (10.04 km)
- Existed: 1973–present

Major junctions
- South end: SR 20 in Okanogan
- SR 155 Spur in Omak
- North end: US 97 / SR 20 in Omak

Location
- Country: United States
- State: Washington
- Counties: Okanogan

Highway system
- State highways in Washington; Interstate; US; State; Scenic; Pre-1964; 1964 renumbering; Former
← SR 213	→ SR 221

State Route 215 (SR 215) is a 6.24-mile-long (10.04 km) state highway serving Okanogan County in the U.S. state of Washington. The highway travels northeast parallel to the Okanogan River from SR 20 in Okanogan to SR 155 Spur in Downtown Omak. SR 215 turns east to end at an intersection with SR 20 and U.S. Route 97 (US 97) in North Omak. The highway was previously part of State Road 10 and Primary State Highway 10 (PSH 10), concurrent with US 97, until a bypass of Omak was built in the 1960s. SR 20 was routed onto the highway after the 1964 highway renumbering, but was moved to the bypass and replaced by SR 215 in 1973.

== Route description ==
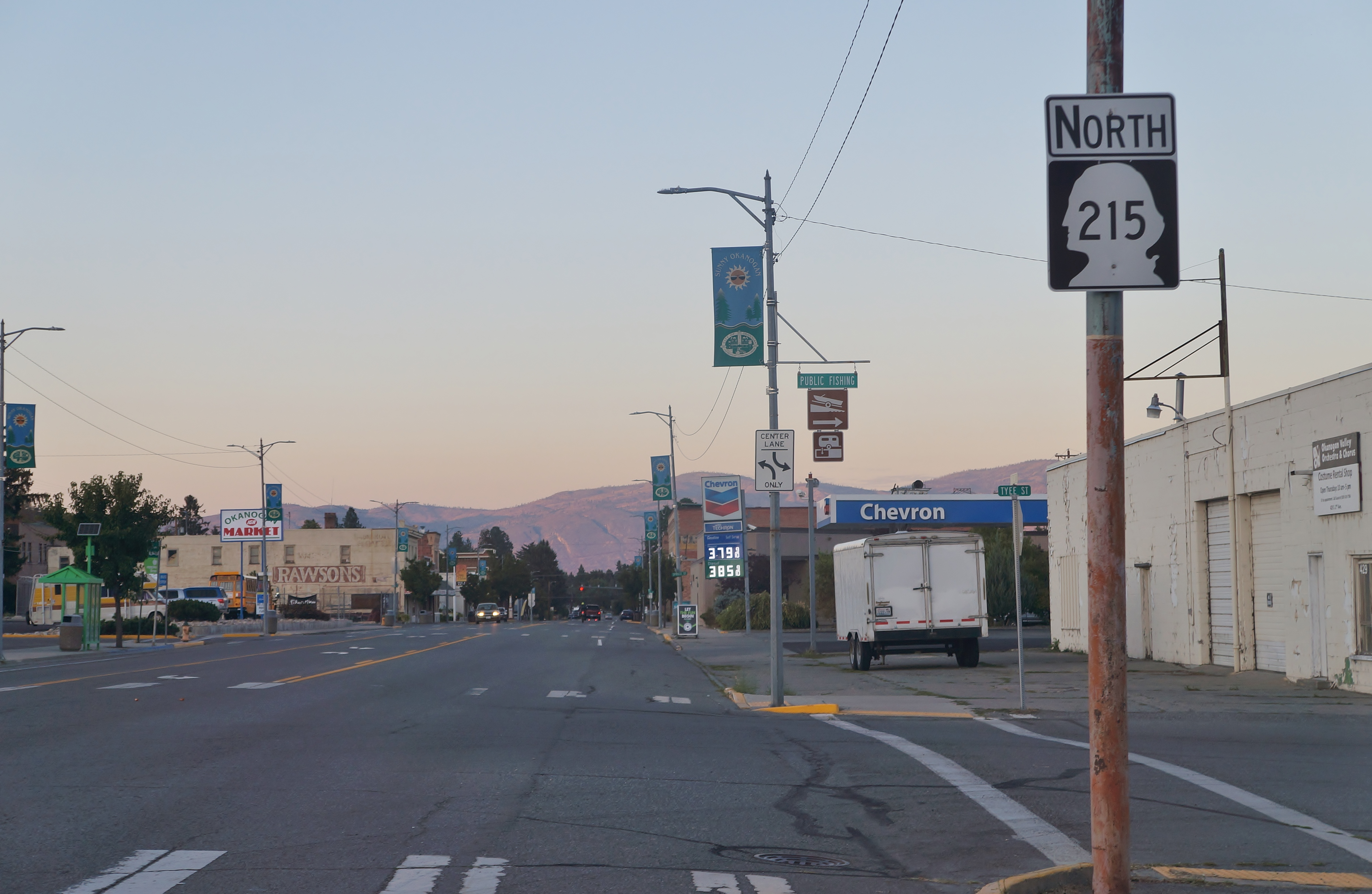
SR 215 northbound in downtown Omak

SR 215 begins as 2nd Avenue in Okanogan at an intersection with SR 20, which turns southeast to cross the Okanogan River. 2nd Avenue crosses over Salmon Creek before it empties into the Okanogan River at Alma Park. The highway continues northeast and passes the Okanogan Community Library before leaving Okanogan for Omak, becoming Elmway. SR 215 passes the Omak Memorial Cemetery and Mid-Valley Hospital before becoming Okoma Drive and entering Downtown Omak. The roadway turns east onto 4th Avenue and back north onto Main Street, passing the local post office, before intersecting Omak Avenue, signed as SR 155 Spur. Main Street continues north and passes the Omak campus of Wenatchee Valley College, before turning east onto Riverside Drive and ending at an intersection with SR 20 and US 97.

Every year the Washington State Department of Transportation (WSDOT) conducts a series of surveys on its highways in the state to measure traffic volume. This is expressed in terms of annual average daily traffic (AADT), which is a measure of traffic volume for any average day of the year. In 2011, WSDOT calculated that between 4,200 and 13,000 vehicles per day used the highway, mostly in Downtown Omak.

== History ==
A north–south road connecting Okanogan to Omak along the Okanogan River has existed since 1903, and was designated as part of State Road 10 in 1905. The highway was named the Chelan and Okanogan Highway in 1919 and became part of US 97 in 1926 during the creation of the United States Numbered Highways, and became PSH 10 during the creation of the Primary and secondary state highways in 1937. Beginning in 1962, a bypass of Omak was constructed on the east side of the Okanogan River, and US 97 was re-routed onto it in 1967. SSH 16A was created using the old alignment of US 97 and PSH 10, extending from PSH 16 in Okanogan to US 97 and PSH 10 in Omak. After the 1964 highway renumbering, SSH 16A became part of SR 20 and was signed into law in 1970, however SR 20 was extended east along US 97 and the old route became SR 215 in 1973. No major revisions to the route of the highway has occurred since 1973.

== Major intersections ==
The entire highway is in Okanogan County.

Location	mi	km	Destinations	Notes
Okanogan	0.00	0.00	SR 20 west (2nd Avenue) / US 97 Bus. south – Twisp, Burlington	South end of US 97 Bus. overlap
Omak	5.05	8.13	SR 155 Spur east (Omak Avenue) to SR 155 – Grand Coulee Dam	Former SR 155
Omak	6.24	10.04	US 97 / SR 20 east / US 97 Bus. – Tonasket, Oroville, Okanogan, Wenatchee	North end of US 97 Bus. overlap
1.000 mi = 1.609 km; 1.000 km = 0.621 mi: Concurrency terminus
