= Omak, Washington =

City in Washington, United States

Omak
- City
- City of Omak
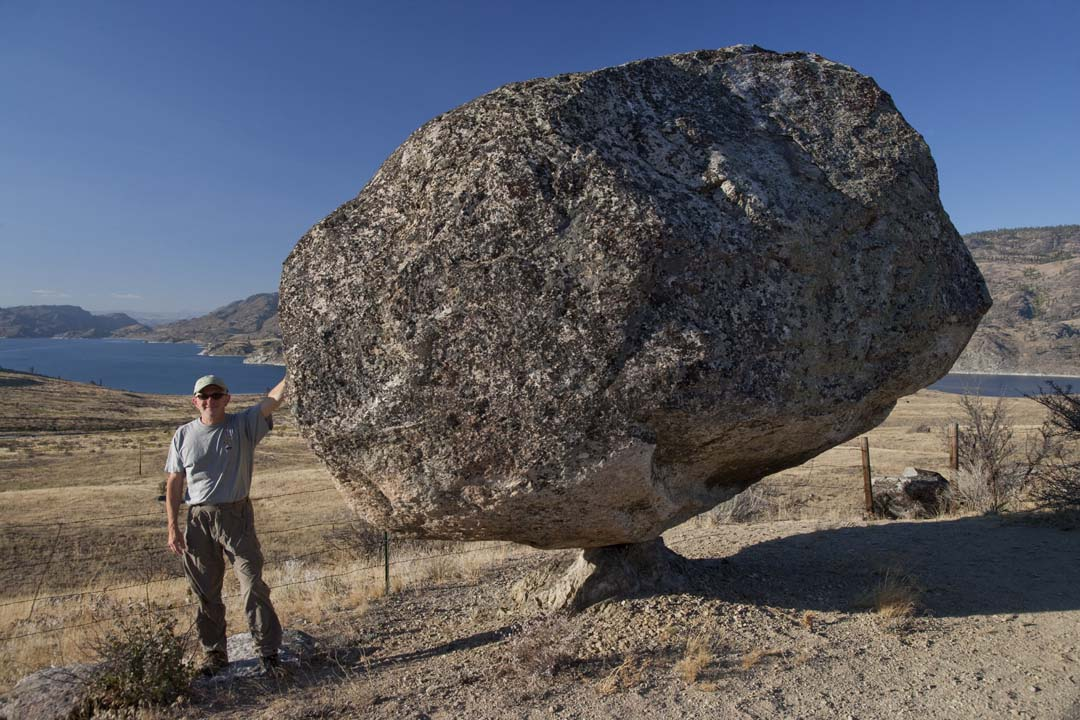
- The townsite of Omak Rock in the foothills of the Okanogan Highlands adjacent to Omak Lake

- Flag
- Motto: Heart of the Okanogan
- Location of Omak in Okanogan County, Washington

- Location in the United States
- Coordinates: 48°25′20″N 119°30′15″W
- Country: United States
- State: Washington
- County: Okanogan
- Established: January 1, 1907
- Incorporated: February 11, 1911
- Founder: Ben Ross

Government
  - Type: Mayor–council
  - Mayor: Cindy Gagné
  - Governing body: Omak City Council

Area
  - City: 3.94 sq mi (10.21 km^{2})
  - Land: 3.86 sq mi (10.00 km^{2})
  - Water: 0.081 sq mi (0.21 km^{2})
  - Urban: 4.83 sq mi (12.5 km^{2})
- Elevation: 925 ft (282 m)

Population (2020)
  - City: 4,860
  - Density: 1,260/sq mi (486/km^{2})
  - Demonym: Omakian
- Time zone: UTC-8 (PST)
  - Summer (DST): UTC-7 (PDT)
- ZIP code: 98841
- Area code: 509
- FIPS code: 53-51340
- GNIS feature ID: 2411320
- Website: www.omakcity.com

Omak (/oʊˈmæk/ o-MAK) is a city located in the foothills of the Okanogan Highlands in north-central Washington, United States. With a population of 4,860 as of 2020, distributed over a land area of 3.43 square miles (8.9 km^{2}), Omak is the largest municipality of Okanogan County and the largest municipality in Central Washington north of Wenatchee. The Greater Omak Area has around 8,229 inhabitants as of the 2010 census. This makes the largest urban cluster in the Okanogan Country region, encompassing most of its twin city of Okanogan.

The land that is now Omak had been inhabited by various Native American tribes before the arrival of non-indigenous settlers in the early 19th century. The city began to develop after the completion of the Okanogan Irrigation Project affecting the Grand Coulee Dam and other nearby electric facilities. The housing and municipal infrastructure, along with regional infrastructure connecting the new town to other municipalities, were built simultaneously in 1908 supported by the local agricultural industry. The name Omak comes from the Okanagan placename [umák], or the Salishan term Omache—which is said to mean "good medicine" or "plenty", referring to its favorable climate, with an annual high of around 88 °F (31 °C). Omak acts as the gateway to the Okanogan–Wenatchee National Forest and consists of a central business district and residential neighborhoods.

Omak is a code city governed by a seven-member council and located in the state's 4th congressional district. Omak's economy is dominated by the primary sector industries of agriculture and forestry, although economic diversification has occurred with sawmills and recreational tourism. Nearby recreational destinations include walking trails, state parks and national forests, such as Conconully State Park, Bridgeport State Park and Osoyoos Lake State Park. The city is home to a weekly newspaper, the Omak–Okanogan County Chronicle, and a Wenatchee Valley College campus. Standards for education in Omak are higher than the state's average, though drugs and alcohol remain a problem among students. U.S. Route 97 passes through the town, while Washington State Route 155, as well as Washington State Route 215, connects the city to Okanogan and Nespelem, respectively. By road, Omak is located approximately 235 miles (378 km) from Seattle, Washington, 140 miles (230 km) from Spokane, Washington and 125 miles (201 km) from Kelowna, British Columbia.

== History ==
=== Origin ===
The Okanogan Valley was the traditional homeland of the Syilx (also called Okanogan) Native Americans, whose territory extended north into what is now British Columbia. The Syilx acquired horses in the mid-18th century, which helped them expand northward. They first met non-native traders and missionaries in the early 19th century. The Syilx participated in trade fairs held at Kettle Falls and at the mouth of the Fraser River. Trading networks strengthened after the acquisition of horses in the mid-18th century.

In 1811, Fort Okanogan was built by the Pacific Fur Company at the confluence of the Okanogan and Columbia Rivers. The fort's ownership passed to the North West Company, then the Hudson's Bay Company. Fort Colvile, near Kettle Falls, was another important fur trading outpost. The Okanogan River was used by fur brigades traveling between Fort Okanogan and Kamloops. In the late 1850s this route became known as the Okanagan Trail and was widely used as an inland route to the Fraser Canyon Gold Rush.

In the 1850s, European-Americans settled in the area that is now Omak and built houses and inaugurated mining, logging and agricultural activities. As more white settlers arrived, a dispute about land ownership arose between them and the Native Americans.

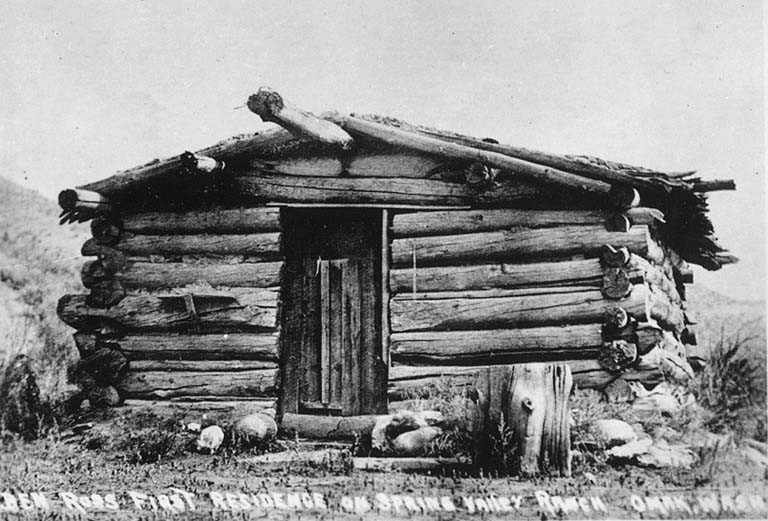
Ben Ross' cabin

In response, a treaty stating that an Indian reservation would be formed on some of the disputed land while the European-Americans would own the remaining land was signed. The Indian land was later reduced to about 5,000,000 acres (2,000,000 ha). Colville Indian Reservation was developed around 1872 during the Presidency of Ulysses S. Grant. In 1887, the Confederated Tribes of the Colville Reservation, a federally recognized tribe, was formed by executive order from 12 individual bands as per the General Allotment Act of 1887. The federal government decided to move Colville Indian Reservation's location west of Columbia River, reducing its area to 2,800,000 acres (1,100,000 ha). It would continue to be reduced for the next 60 years.

Nearby Alma was platted as an unincorporated community around 1886. Alma was renamed Pogue in honor of orchardist J.I. Pogue, and was later renamed Okanogan—the present name. J.I. Pogue was upset that his name was replaced, and requested that surveyor, civil engineer and settler Ben Ross establish another town 4 miles (6.4 km) to the north. Born in Bureau County, Illinois, Ross worked for the Great Northern Railroad shortly before moving to Okanogan County. He decided to found a new community at Pogue's proposed location during 1907. It was named Omak, supposedly for the Salishan word Omache—said to mean "good medicine" or "plenty"—and referring to the town's favorable climate; although according to William Bright the name comes from the Okanagan placename [umák]. Ross sold various items on the present townsite, trying to have his town recognized, and built a cabin in 1907 to provide shelter for his daughter, son and grandchildren—becoming one of the first white men to settle the area.

=== Growth ===
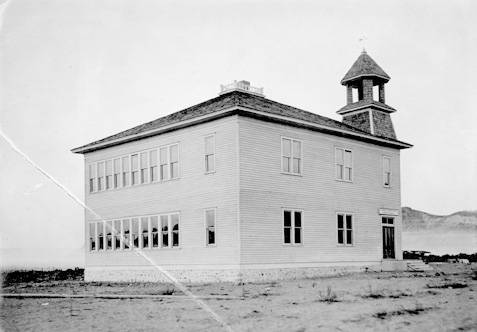
Omak Schoolhouse, 1910

The town began to develop after the completion of the Okanogan Irrigation Project, which was designed to facilitate farming. At this time, many farmers came to Omak looking for homes. Fruits including apples, berries, peaches, plums and watermelons were cultivated after 1910. Omak served as a census-designated place (CDP) in 1910, and incorporated as a city on February 11, 1911. Omak and Okanogan have shared a rivalry in high school sports. During the Great Depression of 1933, several residents of Omak were forced to work in nearby communities. As a result, the United States Bureau of Reclamation promoted work which was available as part of an improvement project at Grand Coulee Dam in nearby Coulee Dam, which employed approximately 5,000 people between 1933 and 1951 when the megaproject ended. By 1950, the city was home to various buildings and structures including the St. Mary Mission church, which satisfied residential needs.

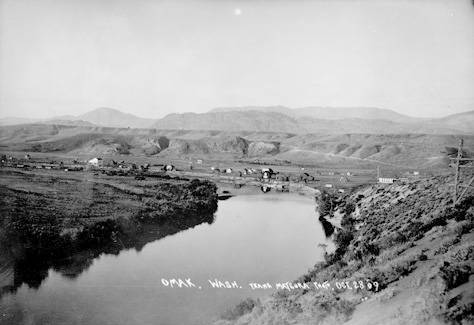
View of Omak, 1909

In the 1910s, Omak was chosen as the location for a sawmill to expand economic growth. Omak Fruit Growers controlled the mill and a nearby orchard processing factory. The Biles-Coleman Lumber Company bought out the organization and built a sawmill outside municipal boundaries on the nearby Omak Mountain in 1924. A secondary sawmill was constructed in the Omak area. The company and their mills were purchased in 1975 by Crown Zellerbach and thus an associated organization—Cavenham Forest Industries—acquired the mills. The company ultimately went bankrupt, and in response, employees purchased the mill for 45 million dollars and renamed it Omak Wood Products in an attempt to save their jobs. Omak Woods Products' payroll decreased to 480 in the early 1990s and later went bankrupt themselves, along with Quality Veneer, who later owned the property for 19 million dollars until 2000. The Confederated Tribes of the Colville Reservation later purchased the mill for 6.6 million dollars, having closed in 2009 because of low demand, ending over 130 jobs. There were proposals in 2013 to reopen the mills during the summer season, but the mill partially burned down in the Cold Springs Fire on September 8, 2020.

== Geography ==
=== Topography ===
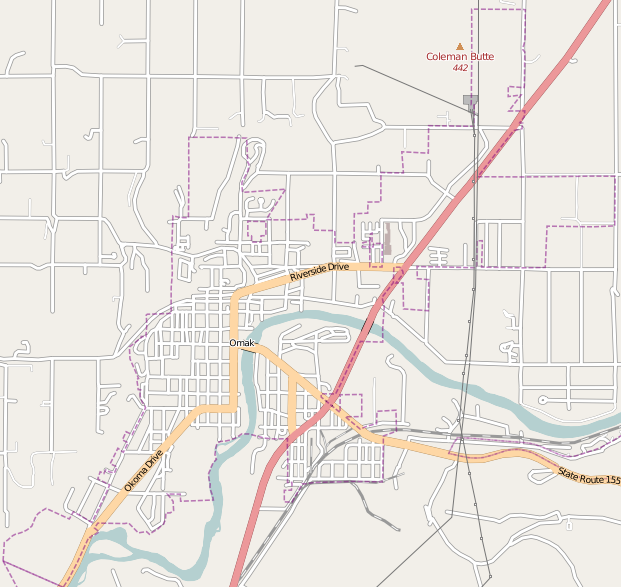
Map of the city limits (in purple) for Omak

The Canada–United States border—with an official crossing into Osoyoos, British Columbia from Oroville—lies approximately 45 miles (72 km) to the north. The Idaho border lies about 160 miles (260 km) southeast. The state's largest city, Seattle, lies 237 miles (381 km) southwest of Omak. The Okanogan River, coming out of the town of Riverside, defines the city's northern border, while the southern border is defined by the city of Okanogan; the terrain here is mountainous and forested. The nearest primary statistical area is the Wenatchee – East Wenatchee metropolitan area. A CDP located northeast of the city was named North Omak because of its proximity to Omak. It is part of two census county divisions: Omak (western half) and Colville Reservation (eastern half).

Omak, situated in the foothills of the Okanogan Highlands in central Okanogan County, is part of the Okanogan Country region, extending into British Columbia. It also lies within the Inland Northwest, centered on Spokane, and the Columbia Plateau ecoregion near the Okanogan Drift Hills. The Okanogan River, a 115-mile (185 km) tributary of the Columbia River, flows through the central portion of the city, and receives Omak Creek from the east just outside municipal boundaries. Known for its balancing Omak Rock, the 3,244-acre (1,313 ha) Omak Lake—eight miles from the city and 950 feet (290 m) above sea level—is the largest saline endorheic lake in Washington. The 80-acre (32 ha) Crawfish Lake is located about 15 miles (24 km) northeast of Omak at the border of the Colville Indian Reservation and Okanogan–Wenatchee National Forest. The 1,499,023-acre (6,066.33 km^{2}) forest comprises varied terrain and several mountain peaks.

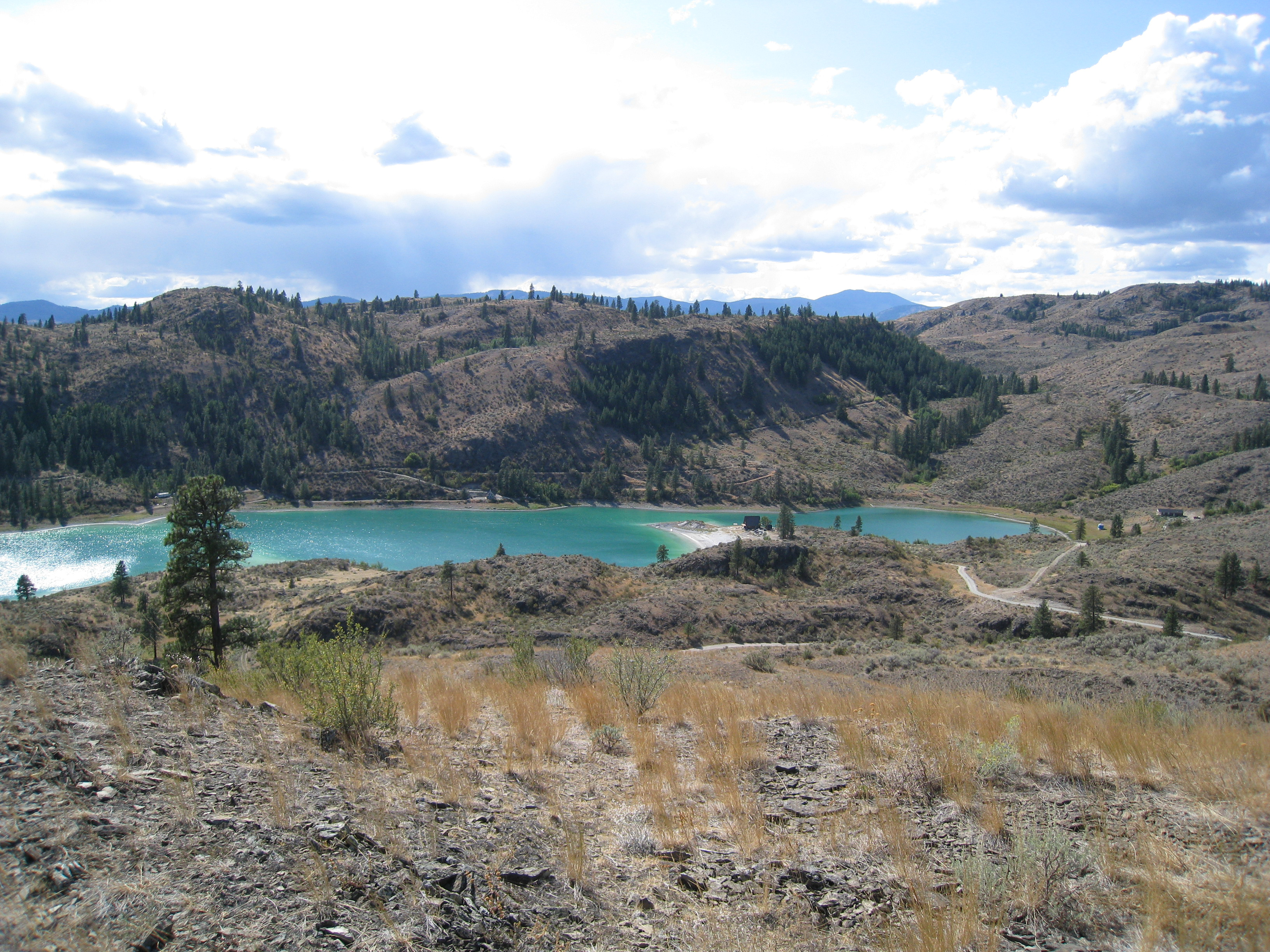
Omak Lake

Elevations around the area range from 780 feet (240 m) above sea level at the mouth of the Okanogan River to 6,774 feet (2,065 m) above sea level at the Moses Mountain. The average elevation is 843 feet (257 m) above sea level according to the United States Geological Survey (USGS). The Moses Mountain, with a summit, sits east of the city, while Little Moses Mountain, located 5,963 feet (1,818 m) above sea level, and Omak Mountain, located 5,749 feet (1,752 m) above sea level, are adjacent to the Moses Mountain. West of the city are the North Cascades, anchored by the Cascade Range. Mountain peaks on the western portion of the Omak area range between 6,000 feet (1,800 m) and 8,000 feet (2,400 m). The Coleman Butte mountain summit—1,450 feet (440 m) above sea level—is located directly adjacent to municipal boundaries.

According to the United States Census Bureau, the city encompasses a total area of 3.5 square miles (9.06 km^{2}), including 0.07 square miles (0.18 km^{2}) of water, accounting for two percent of the overall area. The area expanded in April 2010, when 0.56 square miles (1.5 km^{2}) of land formerly within the city of Okanogan was accumulated. Omak is the fourth largest settlement in Okanogan County by area after Nespelem Community (23 mi^{2}; 60 km^{2}), North Omak (11.2 mi^{2}; 29 km^{2}) and Disautel (3.80 mi^{2}; 9.8 km^{2}). Omak covers 0.07 percent of the county's total area. Its 4.83-square-mile (12.5 km^{2}) urban cluster, the Greater Omak Area, includes the city of Okanogan and the CDP of North Omak. The surrounding metropolitan region comprises a total area of 1,037 square miles (2,690 km^{2}), although it has not officially been designated as a statistical area.

=== Climate ===
Climate chart for Omak

The city experiences a semi-arid climate (Köppen climate classification BSk), with little precipitation, hot summers and cold winters. Average temperatures in Omak range from a 23.3 °F (−4.8 °C) minimum in January to a 89.4 °F (31.9 °C) maximum in July. The lowest temperature recorded was −26 °F (−32 °C) on February 1, 1950, and the highest was 117 °F (47 °C) on June 27, 2021. The annual daily mean temperature is 49.9 °F (9.9 °C). Average monthly precipitation ranges from 0.49 inches (12 mm) in August to 1.66 inches (42 mm) in December. Despite Omak's geographical location further north and very close to the Canadian border, the city of Wenatchee, further to the south has almost the same average annual temperature. as well as several other southern communities.

Omak experiences four distinct seasons. Summers are hot and relatively dry, with a daily average of 72.2 °F (22.3 °C) in July, while winter is the wettest season of the year, with 22.3 inches (570 mm) of snowfall between November and February. Spring and autumn are mild seasons with little precipitation. The city is located in plant hardiness zone 6a, according to the United States Department of Agriculture (USDA). In July 2012, a severe thunderstorm occurred in Omak, producing heavy rainfall, gusty winds and hail, and forced the temporary closure of U.S. Route 97 and requiring repairs to public streets. Omak was affected by the 1872 North Cascades earthquake—the state's largest historical earthquake—which occurred on December 14, 1872. The epicenter was at Omak Lake. The earthquake had a magnitude of between 6.5 and 7.0 and was followed by an aftershock. Another earthquake with minor shaking affected the city in November 2011.

Climate data for Omak, Washington, 1991–2020 normals, extremes 1909–present
| Month | Jan | Feb | Mar | Apr | May | Jun | Jul | Aug | Sep | Oct | Nov | Dec | Year |
|---|---|---|---|---|---|---|---|---|---|---|---|---|---|
| Record high °F (°C) | 62 (17) | 63 (17) | 79 (26) | 96 (36) | 104 (40) | 117 (47) | 114 (46) | 109 (43) | 102 (39) | 90 (32) | 77 (25) | 74 (23) | 117 (47) |
| Mean maximum °F (°C) | 45.6 (7.6) | 51.9 (11.1) | 66.0 (18.9) | 77.3 (25.2) | 88.0 (31.1) | 95.2 (35.1) | 101.7 (38.7) | 101.4 (38.6) | 92.5 (33.6) | 76.4 (24.7) | 58.3 (14.6) | 46.2 (7.9) | 103.3 (39.6) |
| Mean daily maximum °F (°C) | 32.8 (0.4) | 39.8 (4.3) | 52.5 (11.4) | 62.8 (17.1) | 72.4 (22.4) | 79.1 (26.2) | 89.4 (31.9) | 88.8 (31.6) | 78.2 (25.7) | 60.7 (15.9) | 43.0 (6.1) | 32.5 (0.3) | 61.0 (16.1) |
| Daily mean °F (°C) | 28.0 (−2.2) | 32.5 (0.3) | 41.8 (5.4) | 49.8 (9.9) | 58.8 (14.9) | 65.1 (18.4) | 73.7 (23.2) | 72.8 (22.7) | 63.3 (17.4) | 49.1 (9.5) | 35.9 (2.2) | 27.9 (−2.3) | 49.9 (9.9) |
| Mean daily minimum °F (°C) | 23.3 (−4.8) | 25.2 (−3.8) | 31.1 (−0.5) | 36.8 (2.7) | 45.1 (7.3) | 51.1 (10.6) | 58.1 (14.5) | 56.8 (13.8) | 48.4 (9.1) | 37.5 (3.1) | 28.9 (−1.7) | 23.3 (−4.8) | 38.8 (3.8) |
| Mean minimum °F (°C) | 4.2 (−15.4) | 10.2 (−12.1) | 18.8 (−7.3) | 24.6 (−4.1) | 30.5 (−0.8) | 38.8 (3.8) | 45.1 (7.3) | 44.9 (7.2) | 33.5 (0.8) | 22.3 (−5.4) | 12.7 (−10.7) | 6.1 (−14.4) | −0.6 (−18.1) |
| Record low °F (°C) | −22 (−30) | −26 (−32) | −7 (−22) | 15 (−9) | 19 (−7) | 30 (−1) | 35 (2) | 31 (−1) | 20 (−7) | 5 (−15) | −6 (−21) | −21 (−29) | −26 (−32) |
| Average precipitation inches (mm) | 1.33 (34) | 0.91 (23) | 1.06 (27) | 0.83 (21) | 1.19 (30) | 0.98 (25) | 0.52 (13) | 0.27 (6.9) | 0.40 (10) | 0.92 (23) | 1.24 (31) | 1.95 (50) | 11.60 (295) |
| Average snowfall inches (cm) | 8.0 (20) | 4.7 (12) | 0.8 (2.0) | 0.0 (0.0) | 0.0 (0.0) | 0.0 (0.0) | 0.0 (0.0) | 0.0 (0.0) | 0.0 (0.0) | 0.0 (0.0) | 3.0 (7.6) | 8.5 (22) | 25.0 (64) |
| Average precipitation days (≥ 0.01 in) | 10.0 | 8.0 | 7.6 | 5.8 | 7.6 | 6.7 | 3.1 | 2.3 | 3.8 | 6.0 | 9.1 | 11.5 | 81.5 |
| Average snowy days (≥ 0.1 in) | 4.1 | 2.3 | 0.5 | 0.0 | 0.0 | 0.0 | 0.0 | 0.0 | 0.0 | 0.0 | 1.4 | 3.9 | 12.2 |
Source 1: NOAA
Source 2: National Weather Service (average snowfall/snow days 1909-1997)

=== Cityscape ===
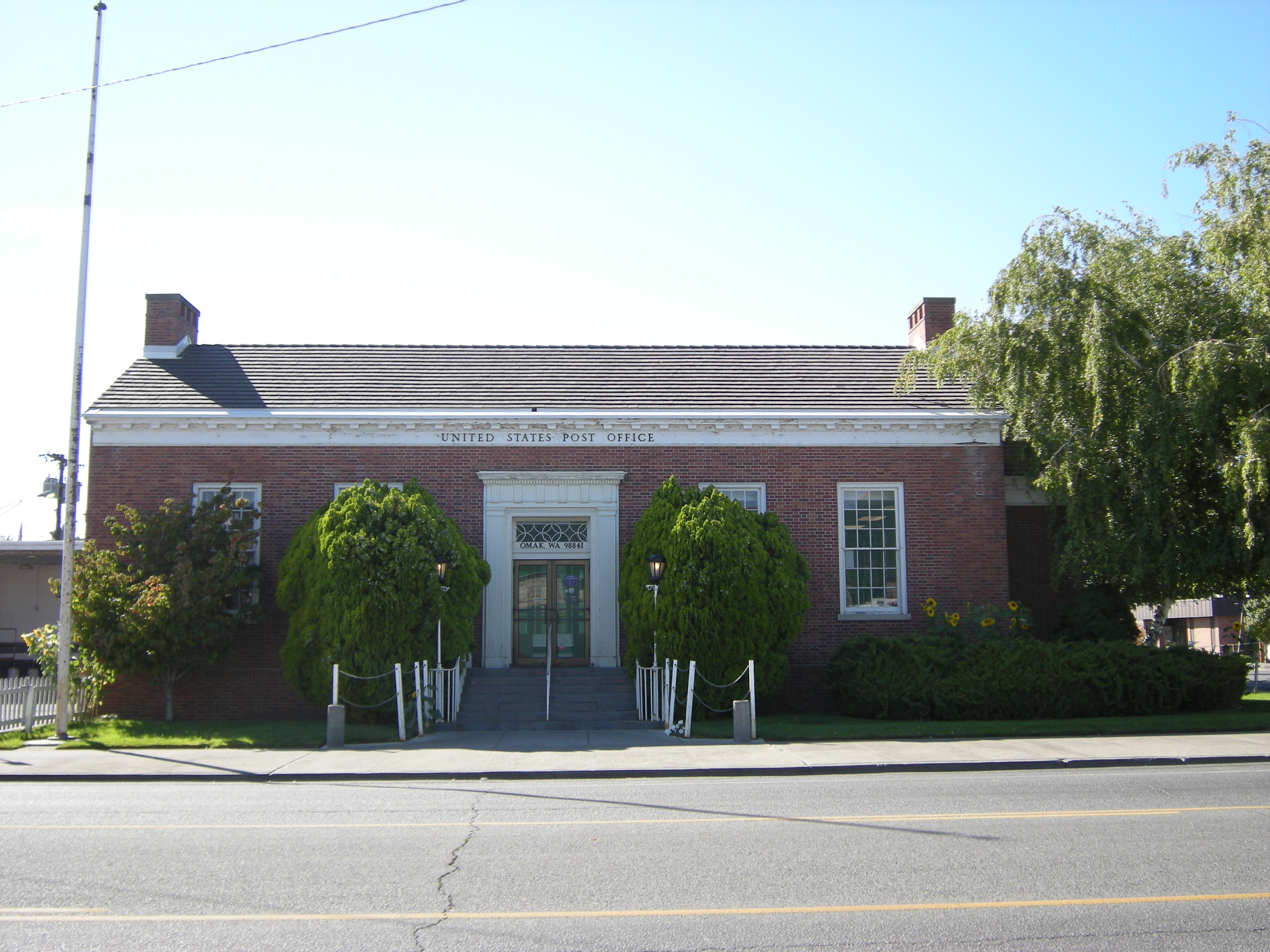
The post office of Omak, managed by the United States Postal Service (USPS)

Omak is a planned city. Throughout the 20th century, Ross designed what would become the city of Omak. Within a year of its establishment, the town had a central business district with a public bank and hotel supported by the local agricultural industry. The town was provided with a post office, previously known as Epley. Ross founded Omak School District in 1906; soon after this its first school, Omak Schoolhouse, was built. In 1910, a meat market, hardware shop, law office, stationery and confectionery store were constructed in Downtown Omak. A steel bridge built the following year collapsed into the Okanogan River upon initial use. It was quickly rebuilt with no further problems.

The city consists of a central business district and residential areas. Downtown Omak, the central business district, is the economic center for Omak and Okanogan County. There are several functional churches in the city. The post office in Omak—managed by United States Postal Service (USPS)—is the city's only listing of the National Register of Historic Places (NRHP). The Breadline Cafe is a notable restaurant and music venue in Downtown Omak. The City of Omak maintains the Omak Memorial Cemetery, comprising around 3,747 graves in a region located adjacent to Washington State Route 215, having been formerly known as Okanoma Cemetery. The 118-acre (48 ha) North Omak Business Park, the city's business park, is bordered by U.S. Route 97 from the east. The city's residential neighborhoods are encompassed by East Omak and South Omak.

== Demographics ==
Historical population
| Census | Pop. | Note | %± |
|---|---|---|---|
| 1910 | 520 | | — |
| 1920 | 525 | | 1.0% |
| 1930 | 2,547 | | 385.1% |
| 1940 | 2,918 | | 14.6% |
| 1950 | 3,791 | | 29.9% |
| 1960 | 4,068 | | 7.3% |
| 1970 | 4,164 | | 2.4% |
| 1980 | 4,007 | | −3.8% |
| 1990 | 4,117 | | 2.7% |
| 2000 | 4,721 | | 14.7% |
| 2010 | 4,845 | | 2.6% |
| 2020 | 4,860 | | 0.3% |
Sources: Greater Omak; Comprehensive Plan; U.S. Decennial Census; 2020 Census

The 1910 United States census, before the city's incorporation, recorded 520 residents. The following 1920 census—the first to define Omak as a distinct subdivision—counted 2,500 residents, making it the most populous municipality of Okanogan County, having surpassed Okanogan (1,519 residents). Subsequent census counts documented an increase to 4,000 residents before a shrink in population at the 1980 census, when fruit prices rose, land was lost, and major employers were shut down. After this decline, the population steadily increased, approaching approximately 5,000 residents by the 2000 census. Between 1990 and 2000, the city's population experienced a boom of 14.7 percent, while between 2000 and 2010, the population increased by around 2.6 percent.

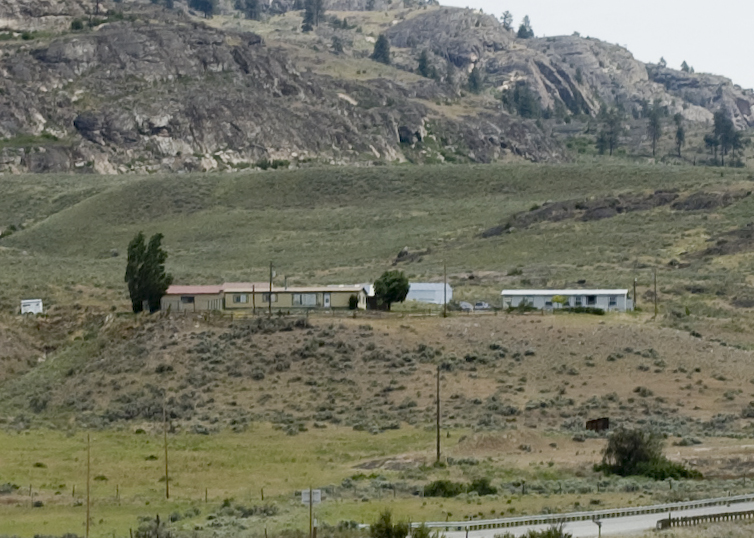
The historic St. Mary's Mission church

=== 2020 census ===
As of the 2020 census, Omak had a population of 4,860 residents in 2,008 households. The city had 2,222 housing units, of which 9.6% were vacant or listed for occasional use. The racial makeup of Omak was 61.6% White, 0.9% Black or African American, 18.5% American Indian and Alaska Native, 1.0% Asian, 0.1% Native Hawaiian and Other Pacific Islander, and 6.7% from another race. Residents who listed two or more races were 11.2% of the population. The Hispanic or Latino residents of any race was 15.8% of the population.

The median age of an Omak resident was 39.2 years. 24.8% of residents were under the age of 18 and 20.6% of residents were 65 years of age or older. For every 100 females there were 91.4 males, and for every 100 females age 18 and over there were 89.2 males age 18 and over.

There were 2,008 households in Omak, of which 29.5% had children under the age of 18 living in them. Of all households, 32.7% were married-couple households, 23.2% were households with a male householder and no spouse or partner present, and 35.3% were households with a female householder and no spouse or partner present. About 36.1% of all households were made up of individuals and 17.9% had someone living alone who was 65 years of age or older.

=== 2010 census ===
According to the 2010 census, Omak had 4,845 residents living in 2,037 households, with 1,412.5 inhabitants per square mile (545.4/km^{2}). These residents created an average age of 38—one year higher than that of the entire state. About 15 percent of residents were single and 13 percent were lone-parent households. With 2,168 housing units at an average density of 632.1 inhabitants per square mile (244.1/km^{2}), the city's populace consisted of 2,540 females and 2,305 males, giving it a gender balance close to national averages with 14.8 percent male and 11.9 percent female. The racial makeup was dominated by white people, with 71 percent of the population. Omak had an urbanized population of 8,229 people, with 1,737 inhabitants per square mile (670.7/km^{2}) and around 20 percent of the county's residents.

The 2010 census showed that approximately 35 percent of residents lived alone, most of whom were female. Those over the age of 65 comprised about 16 percent of the population.

== Economy ==
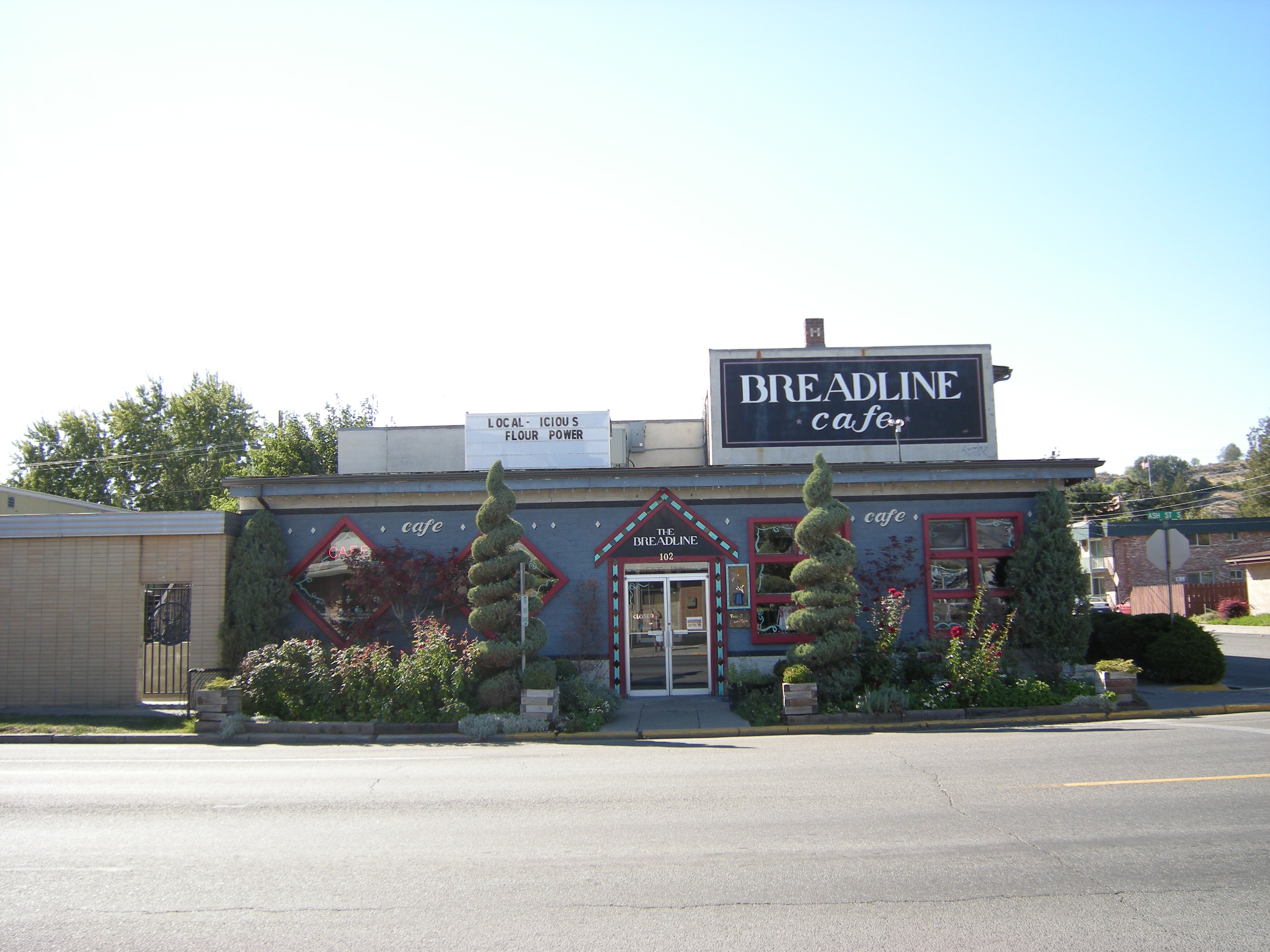
Breadline Cafe

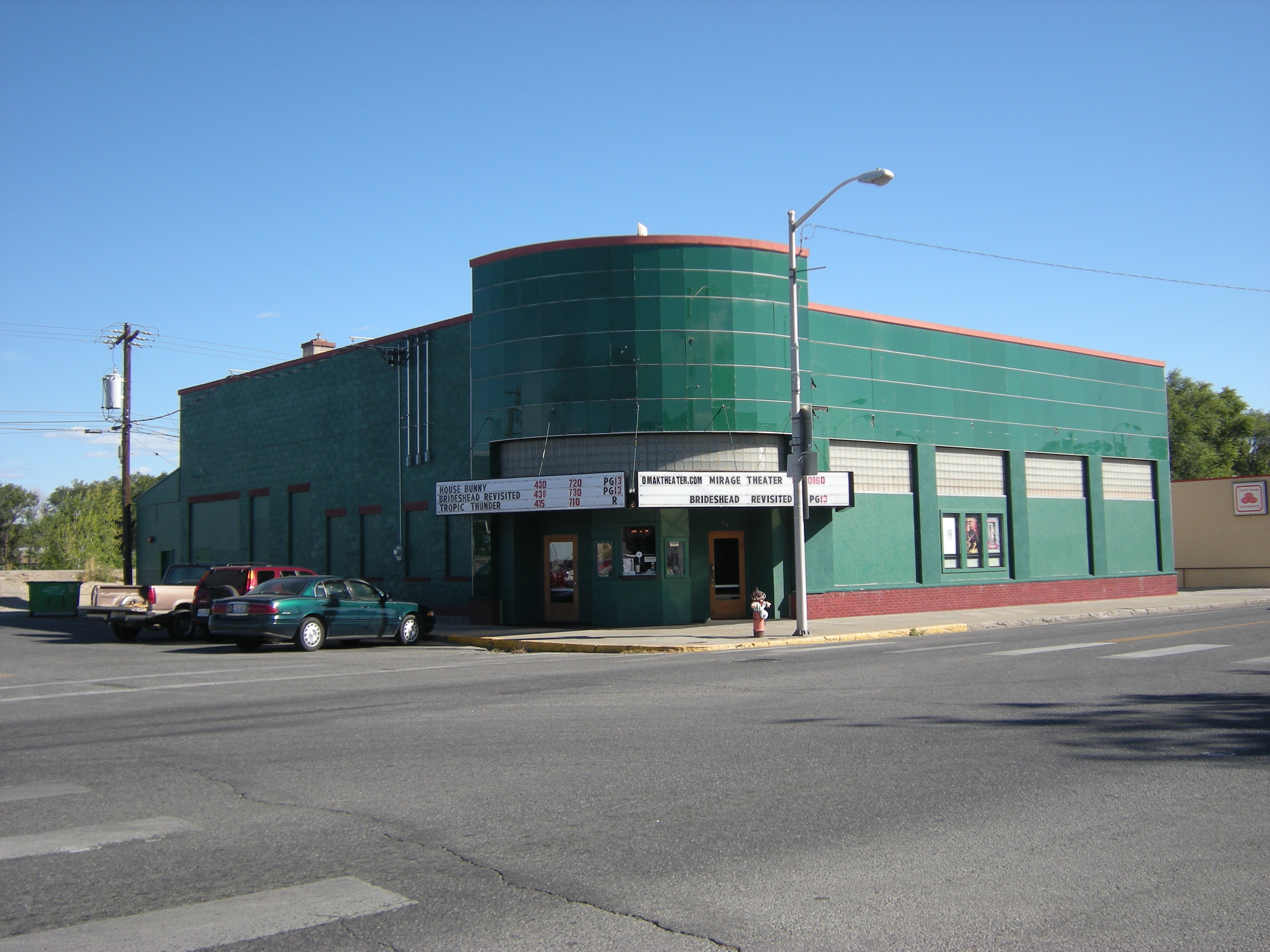
Mirage Theaters

Omak is the commercial center for the rural communities of Okanogan County and other nearby settlements. It is the regional center for services and trade in the county. As of 2007, the city's economy is experiencing significant growth, according to the County of Okanogan. It is an agricultural community with a reliant forestry industry. In the late 1990s and early 2000s, almost 90 percent of Omak's manufacturing jobs were in the city's two sawmills. Infrastructure services and retail trades were also major industries. About 425 private firms employed a total of 3,332 workers in local industries including manufacturing, retail and infrastructure, at this time. Located within Greater Omak, the adjacent city of Okanogan serves as the administrative center for Okanogan County, the region's largest employer.

As of 2010, there are 1,859 civilians over the age of 16 employed in the city of Omak. Despite its recognition as an agricultural community, there were only 26 inhabitants employed in the agriculture and forestry industries, but the surrounding area has more agricultural jobs. Office and sale services were the largest occupation in Omak, comprising approximately 30 percent of the city's total employees, followed by business occupations, with 26.5 percent. Majority of residents work in public services. Approximately seven percent of people in Omak are unemployed, while 25 percent live below the poverty line, including 34 percent of those under 18 and 10 percent of those aged 65 or over. The cost of living rate is 85.5 per unit, less than state and national averages. During the 2007–2011 American Community Survey, the city had a per capita income of $17,785 and an average income of $31,649 per household. Omak's 98841 zip code maintained 265 businesses in 2011, with an average payroll of $78,884.

The city has a Walmart store, which was built in 1993 as the state's first such store, serving over 60,000 residents. The process of opening the retail facility took various discussions and approvals. Proposals in Omak began around 1992, in which 93,188 square feet (8,657.4 m^{2}) of land were expropriated from the Omak Planning Commission. Local retailers feared that the chain would devastate their businesses, although other people felt that it would increase business at other shopping regions in the city. Shortly after its opening, numerous shoppers came to the Omak area looking for items. Walmart hired approximately 200 employees, boosting the city's economy significantly and becoming among Okanogan County's largest retailer for a short period. The store was later allowed to remain open for 24 hours per day.

Omak's economy is also driven by a mixture of tourism. Nearby recreational destinations, with their mild climate, increase the local economy significantly. The local Harbor Freight, Big 5 Sporting Goods, North 40 and Walmart retail stores maintain license vendors for recreational activities. There is a 1,541,470-square-foot (143,207 m^{2}) shopping mall, the Omache Shopping Center, located in North Omak Business Park along U.S. Route 97, which attracts residents from nearby rural communities. Established in 1987, the mall is home to 12 stores and services. Omak is the headquarters of two infrastructure organizations: Okanogan County Transportation & Nutrition and Cascade and Columbia River Railroad.

== Culture ==
=== Nicknames ===
The municipality has been named a "tree city" for ten consecutive years since April 2007. The Washington Department of Natural Resources announced on April 11, 2013, that Omak had again been named a "tree city" because of their continuous efforts to "keep urban forests healthy and vibrant" for 15 years. The City of Omak brands itself as the "Heart of the Okanogan"—referring to its significant economic importance in the Okanogan. The Okanogan County Tourism Council uses the same branding to define the Greater Omak region. It is officially recognized as the City of Omak; Omak residents are known as Omakians.

=== Tourism ===
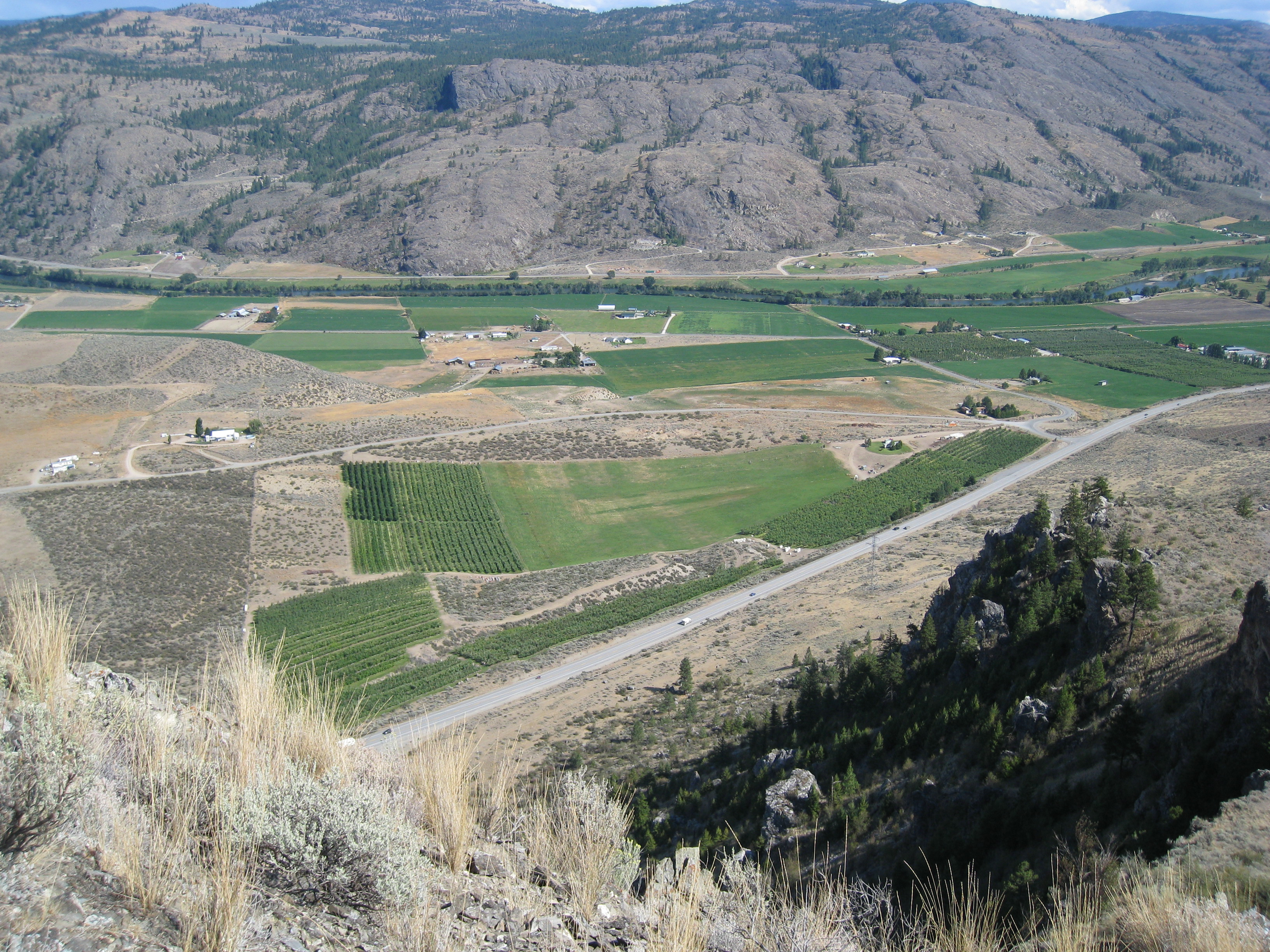
Agricultural land and mountains of Omak

The Omak Stampede, which operates the Suicide Race, has been hosted at a local rodeo facility, the Stampede Arena—renovated in 2009—since 1933. The Omak Stampede occurs annually on the second weekend of August. During the event, the city has an estimated population of approximately 30,000 people. As part of the Suicide Race, horses and riders run down Suicide Hill—a 62-degree slope that runs for 225 feet (69 m) to the Okanogan River. Horses must pass a veterinarian examination to ensure they are physically healthy, and a swim test to ensure they can cross the river, to demonstrate their ability to run the race and navigate the river. Several animal rights groups, including Progressive Animal Welfare Society (PAWS), In Defense of Animals and Humane Society of the United States (HSUS), have expressed concerns about the horses' welfare and have opposed the specific event.

Other significant events include the Omak Film Festival, inclusive of a variety of films at the Wenatchee Valley College and Omak Theater, the Okanogan County Fair, an annual carnival at the County Fairgrounds and the Omak Western and Native Art Show, a Native American carnival. In an attempt to increase tourism, the City of Omak operates a Main Street Historical Tour in the central business district. A local recreational complex comprises a Native American wooden sculpture area. Two functional movie theaters, the single screen Omak Theater, built in 1928, and the Mirage Theater with three screens, built in 2004, service the city. A drive-in theater, with a capacity of 250 automobiles, was proposed in 1948, but never built.

The Omak Visitor Information Center—deemed the "best little information center in the west"—has historical images and a gift shop offering pamphlets regarding Okanogan County and surrounding regions. The Okanogan County Historical Museum comprises a historic fire hall, research center, genealogical area and a display of historical photographs or the area. The Omak Performing Arts Center—a 500-seat venue which hosts presentations, ceremonies, and performances—was built by Omak School District in 1989. There is a 58,000-square-foot (5,400 m^{2}) casino operated by the Confederated Tribes of the Colville Reservation since 2008, incorporating over 400 gaming machines, a convention center, and an arcade. Nearby Okanogan Bingo Casino, along U.S. Route 97, also primarily serves Omak, consisting of approximately 360 gaming machines.

=== Recreation ===
The area's mild climate and its close proximity to lakes, rivers, and mountains make Omak an outdoor recreational destination. The city maintains eight general recreational complexes, of which the 76.6-acre (31.0 ha) Eastside Park, with an enclosed skate park, municipal pool, seven baseball diamonds, four soccer fields and tennis courts, and two basketball courts, is the largest. Civic League Park is the municipality's oldest park, while Dalton Klessig Park is the newest. The Omak City Park Board has been formed to protect these public spaces. Omak has several beaches at the north–south shores of Omak Lake on the Colville Indian Reservation, comprising over 100 acres (40 ha) of sandy land. Fishing and boating are available at Omak Lake, and at the Fry Lake and Duck Lake—near the city's local airport—and Conconully Lake, Crawfish Lake and the Okanogan River, all of which are home to several species. The Valley Lanes bowling alley serves the city and has hosted intrastate competitions, while the Okanogan Valley Golf Club—a country club with 334-and-284-yard (305 and 260 m) golf courses—is located in Omak.

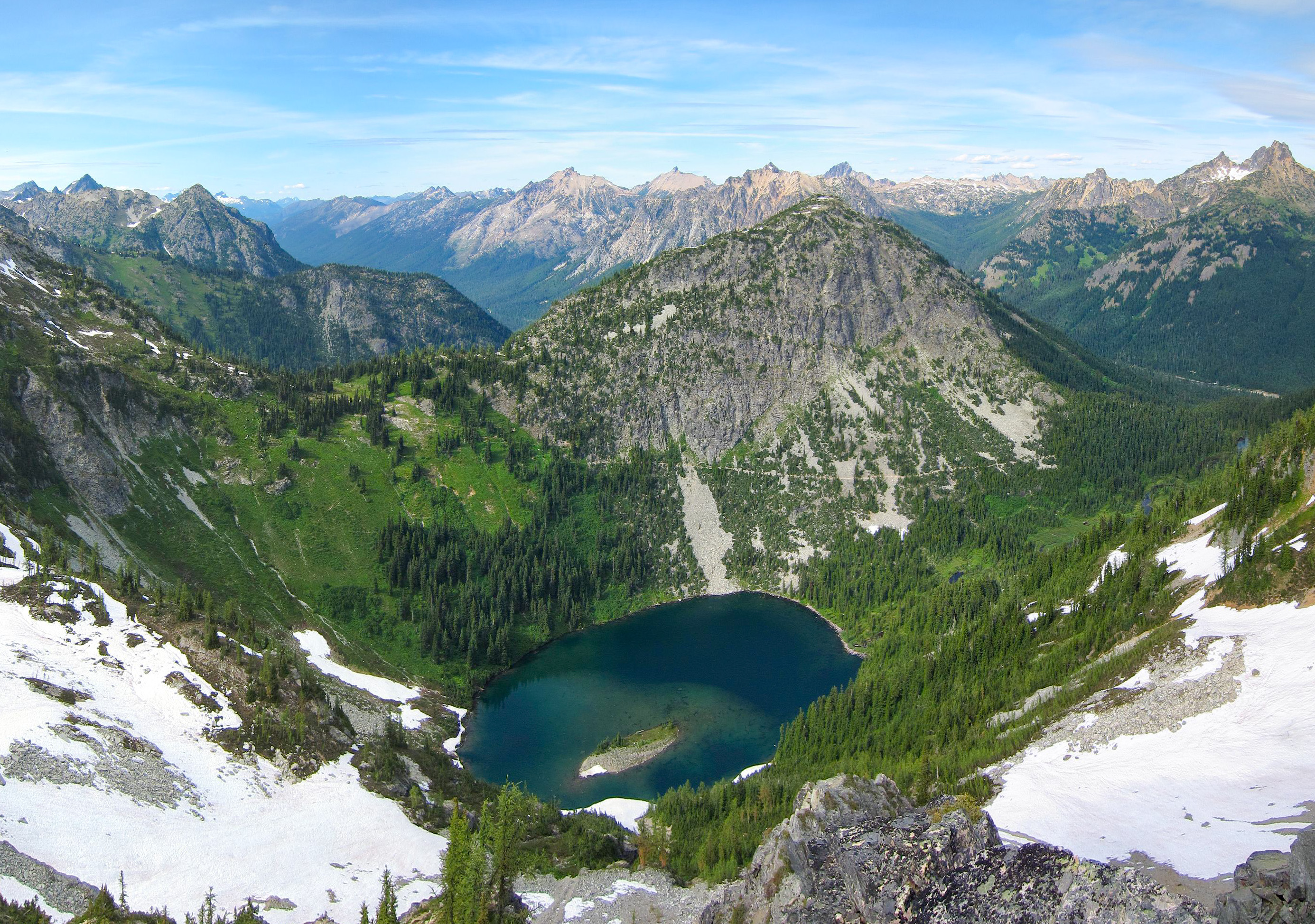
The Okanogan–Wenatchee National Forest provides residents with hiking trails close to home.

The Okanogan–Wenatchee National Forest, the largest forest on the West Coast, provides residents with trails for walking, hiking and cycling close to home and encompasses several skiing regions. It received approximately 397,000 visitors in 2005, most of whom came from over 50 miles (80 km) away. Numerous general recreational opportunities, such as hunting and rock scenery, are available nearby. There are various hiking trails in nearby hilly areas, including Omak Mountain and its look-out tower, and Moses Mountain. The Granite Mountain Trail is located between the forests about 33 miles (53 km) away from the city. There is skiing available about 25 miles (40 km) west of town at the Loup Loup Ski Bowl. Nearby state parks include Conconully State Park (17 mi or 27 km northwest), Bridgeport State Park (36 mi or 58 km south), Osoyoos Lake State Park (41 mi or 66 km north), and Alta Lake State Park (47 mi or 76 km southwest). Birdwatchers can see quail, anatidae, turkey buzzard, wild turkey and bald eagles in the Omak area.

Camping is available at local recreational vehicle parks (RV parks). There are over a half-dozen campgrounds in proximity to Omak. The Omak–Okanogan region has been well known for its rock climbing structures since the early 1970s. Nearby communities in Okanogan County offer horseback riding and hunting. Fishing and boating is achievable within short distance, at the nearby Omak Lake. The Omak Pioneers represent Omak High School as their baseball, basketball, football, soccer, volleyball, and wrestling teams. There are separate teams based on age and gender. There are all-terrain vehicle (ATV) courses located nearby, specifically in the Loup Loup Ski Bowl.

=== Media ===
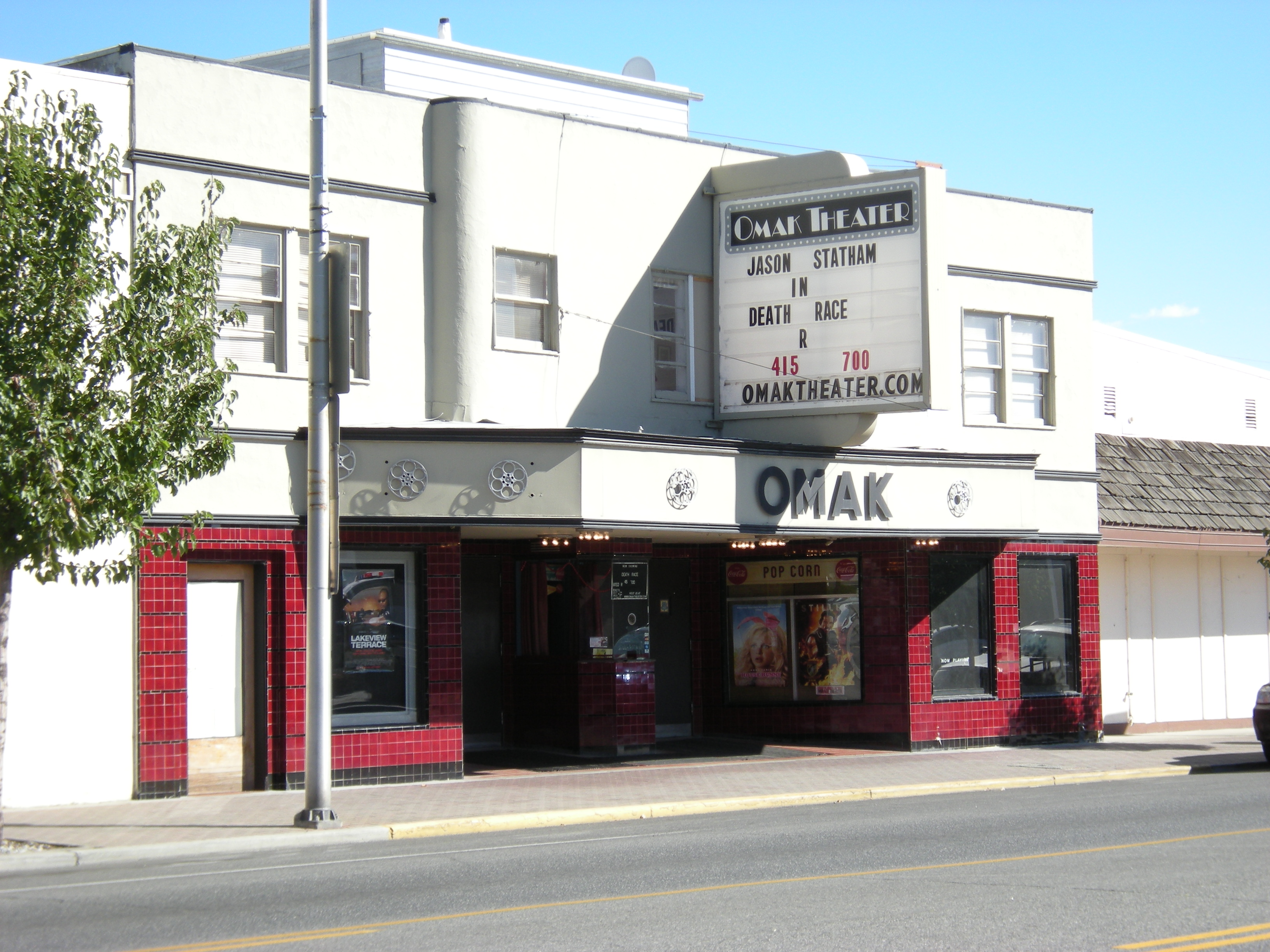
Omak Theater

In 1910, C.P. Scates established the Omak Chronicle. Three years later, it was renamed The Omak-Okanogan County Chronicle and expanded its coverage to the whole county as its primary newspaper. In February 1998, an online version was established, which had approximately 170,000 viewers in April 2013. Since then, the newspaper has been expanded to serve nearby Ferry County. The Okanogan Valley Gazette–Tribune, based in Oroville, and The Wenatchee World, based in Wenatchee, serve Omak as alternative publications. Okanogan Living, a monthly lifestyle magazine based in Tonasket, also serves the region.

Becki Andrist owns three licensed radio stations in the city. Branded as "Radio Okanogan", KOMW broadcasts an oldies format and serves the entire valley floor, while country music station KNCW (branded as "Okanogan Country Radio" features programming from Citadel Media and Dial Global. KZBE also broadcasts programming from Dial Global in the adult contemporary format, while KQWS operates from Washington State University as Northwest Public Radio.

Omak is well-served by television and radio, with all major U.S. networks and at least five other English-language stations available. Omak cable viewers can also receive CHAN-DT (Global Television Network) from Vancouver, British Columbia. The nearest major television market area is based in the Seattle metropolitan area. The Omak–Okanogan market area includes several broadcast television stations that can be received in the city. K17EV-D, channel 17—a broadcast translator of KSPS-TV—is branded as Public Broadcasting Service (PBS), while K07DG, channel 7, rebroadcasts KREM, a CBS affiliate, in the municipality. An American Broadcasting Company (ABC) affiliate, KXLY-TV is translated as K09DG in Omak. K11DM, channel 11, is a translator of National Broadcasting Company (NBC)'s KHQ-TV, Community television stations, K19AU-D and the Fox Broadcasting Company translator at K31AH-D, are owned by Mountain Licenses and operate from Omak, in addition to a Three Angels Broadcasting Network-owned station, K26GV-D. The Riverside market area is nearby and contains three licensed television stations which can be received, including K08CY, K10DM, and K12CV.

== Government and politics ==
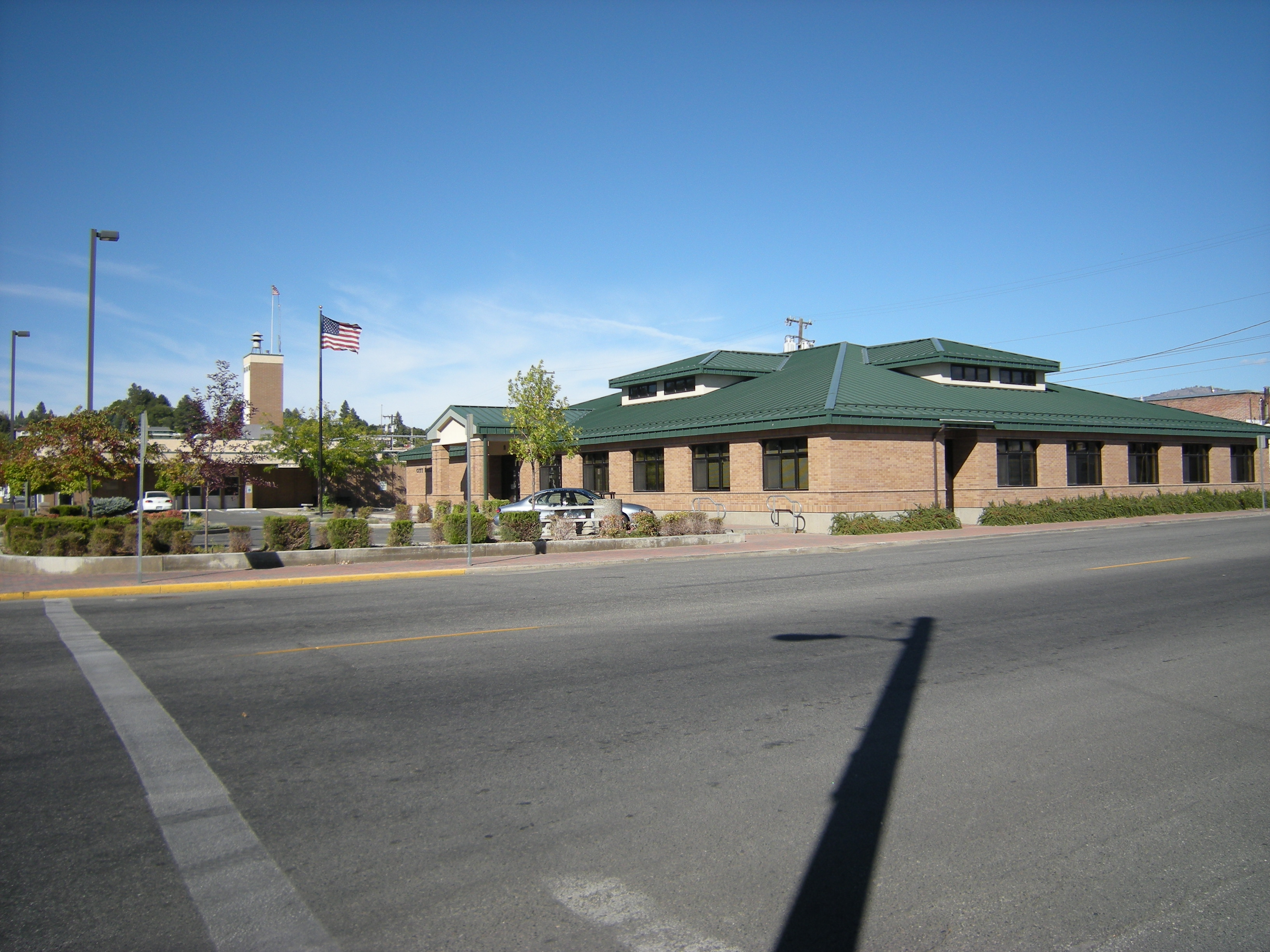
Omak City Hall

The City of Omak's mayor–council government comprises a mayor—who also represents north-central Washington's separate economic development district—and a seven-member council. These positions, stipulated by the Omak City Code, are subject to at-large elections every two years, rather than by geographic subdivisions. Like most portions of the United States, government and laws are run by a series of ballot initiatives whereby citizens can pass or reject laws, referendums whereby citizens can approve or reject legislation already passed, and propositions where specific government agencies can propose new laws or tax increases directly to the people. Federally, Omak is part of Washington's 4th congressional district, represented by Republican Dan Newhouse, who was sworn in on January 3, 2015. The current mayor, Cindy Gagne, was first elected in 2000 as a councilwomen, and was appointed in May 2009.

The State of Washington operates a public government administration office in Omak for access to social and health assistance. Omak is considered to be a code city, based on proposals to provide the local government with more authority from its previous second-class city status. With a functional court for traffic, parking and civil infractions, the city maintains the sewer, water, local road, sidewalk, street lighting, animal control, building inspection, park, and recreation services. It also funds a volunteer fire department which services Omak and nearby rural communities.

Omak is also governed by an eight-member planning commission—part of the Omak City Council—which also operates the Greater Omak Comprehensive Plan, adopted in April 2004 and consisting of improvements considered for the city and surrounding communities. The five-member Omak Library Board and Tree Board are also divisions of the Omak City Council, with public meetings taking place at the Omak Public Library. With four-year terms for participants, the local Civil Service Commission services Omak. Shortly after being incorporated in 1911, Omak unsuccessfully contested Okanogan to become the administrative center of Okanogan County, after Conconully lost its status. During the temperance movement before national prohibition, Omak residents favored the banishment of alcohol in Washington, which was opposed by those of Okanogan. The United States Army (USA) operates two military recruiting centers in Omak, although a historical military band, the Omak Military Band, also operated around 1910.

The five-officer Omak Police Department detachment, which covered the municipality and nearby rural communities, reported over 180 criminal code offenses in 2010. The city's crime rate of 154 offenses per 100,000 people is 28 percent higher than the 2010 state average and one percent higher than the 2010 federal average. According to Uniform Crime Report statistics compiled by the Federal Bureau of Investigation (FBI) in 2011, there were 19 violent crimes and 166 property crimes. The violent crimes consisted of one forcible rape, three robberies and 15 aggravated assaults, while 32 burglaries, 104 larceny-thefts, eight motor vehicle thefts and one arson defined the property crimes. The FBI classifies Omak as having 4,921 people located within the Omak Police Department area. The city's highest crime rate was recorded in 2004, with 413 incidents per 100,000 people. Until 2013, when a murder and motor-vehicle theft occurred in the city, there had not been a homicide for over ten consecutive years. The crime in Omak has decreased throughout the past decade. Before marijuana was legalized in Washington, marijuana users were arrested, per state law. Growers, drug lords and international smugglers residing in the Omak area are still arrested.

== Education ==
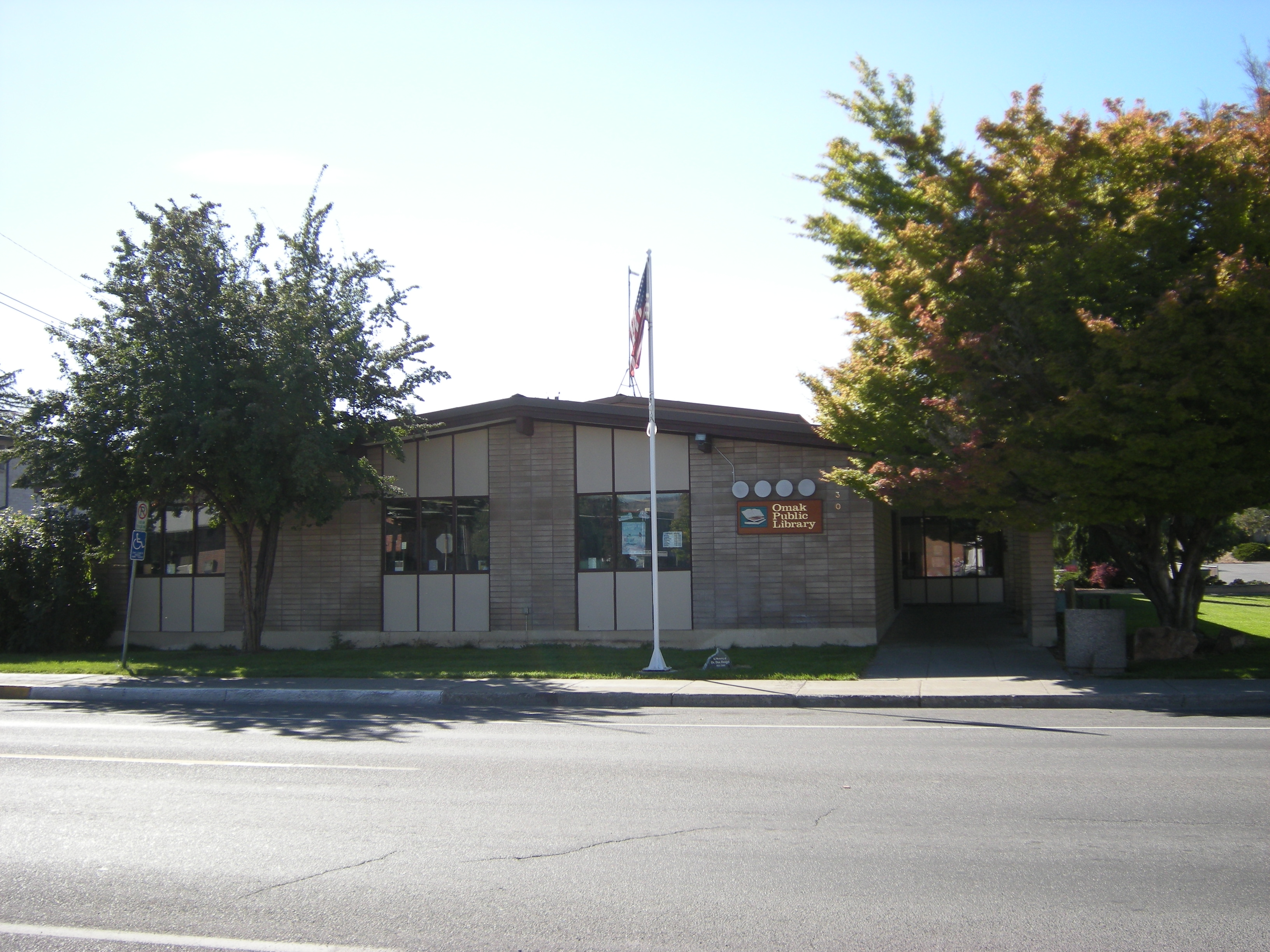
The Omak Public Library is a branch of NCW Libraries (formerly North Central Regional Library).

The 2010 census estimated that 1,057 people in Omak have attended college, while 504 residents received an academic degree; more than five percent higher than the state average. Approximately 91.5 percent graduated from high school or a more advanced institution; two percent higher than the state average.

The city is served by the Omak School District. It, the county's largest school district, operates two mainstream high schools, one mainstream middle school, two mainstream elementary schools and three virtual schools. Omak High School, built in 1919, had a 2010–11 enrollment of 435 students, while the Omak Alternative High School had an enrollment of 48 students. Omak Middle School had an enrollment of 339 children. The city's primary schools are East Omak Elementary and North Omak Elementary which had a combined 2010–11 enrollment of 748 children.

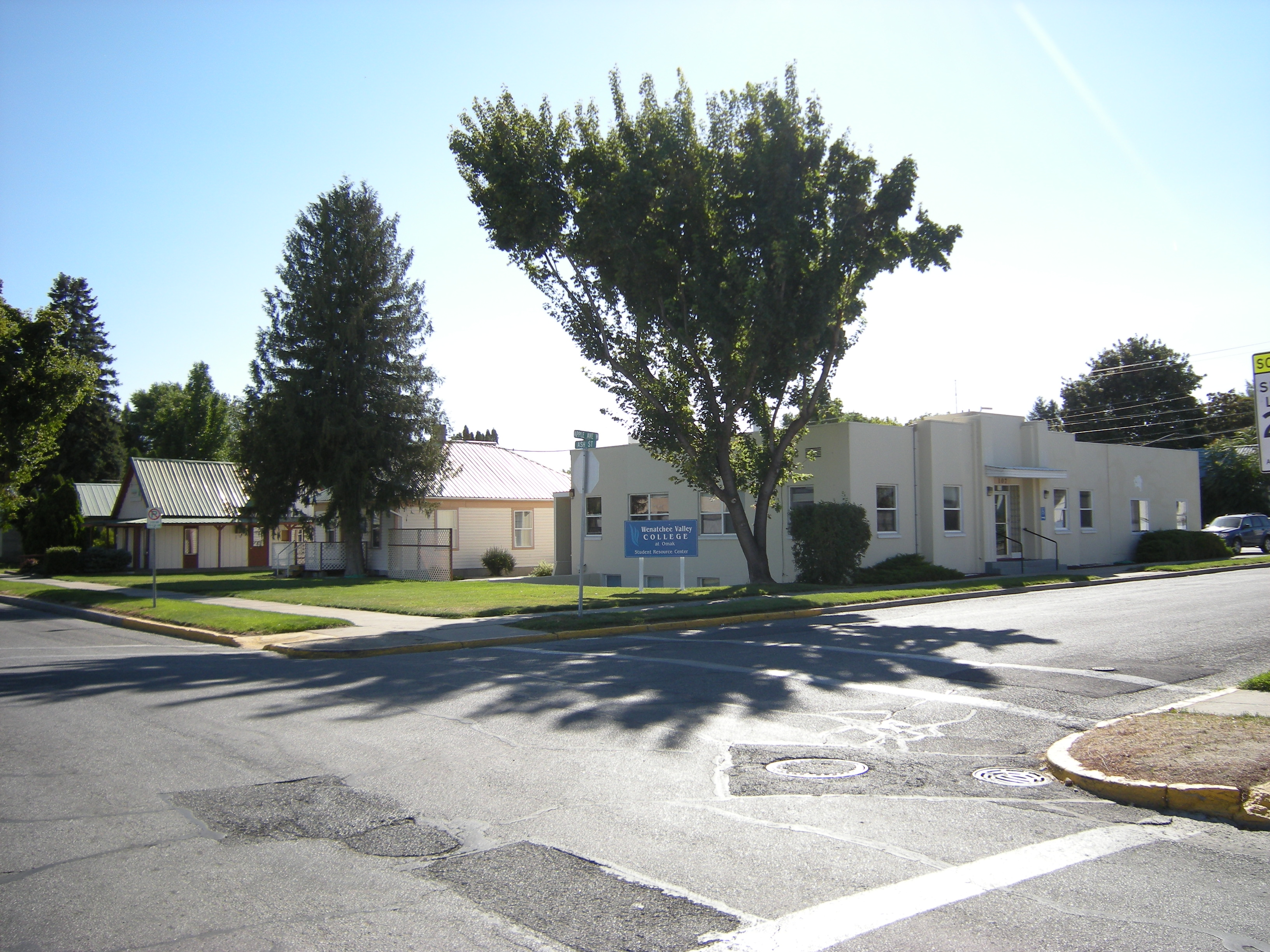
Wenatchee Valley College maintains an Omak campus.

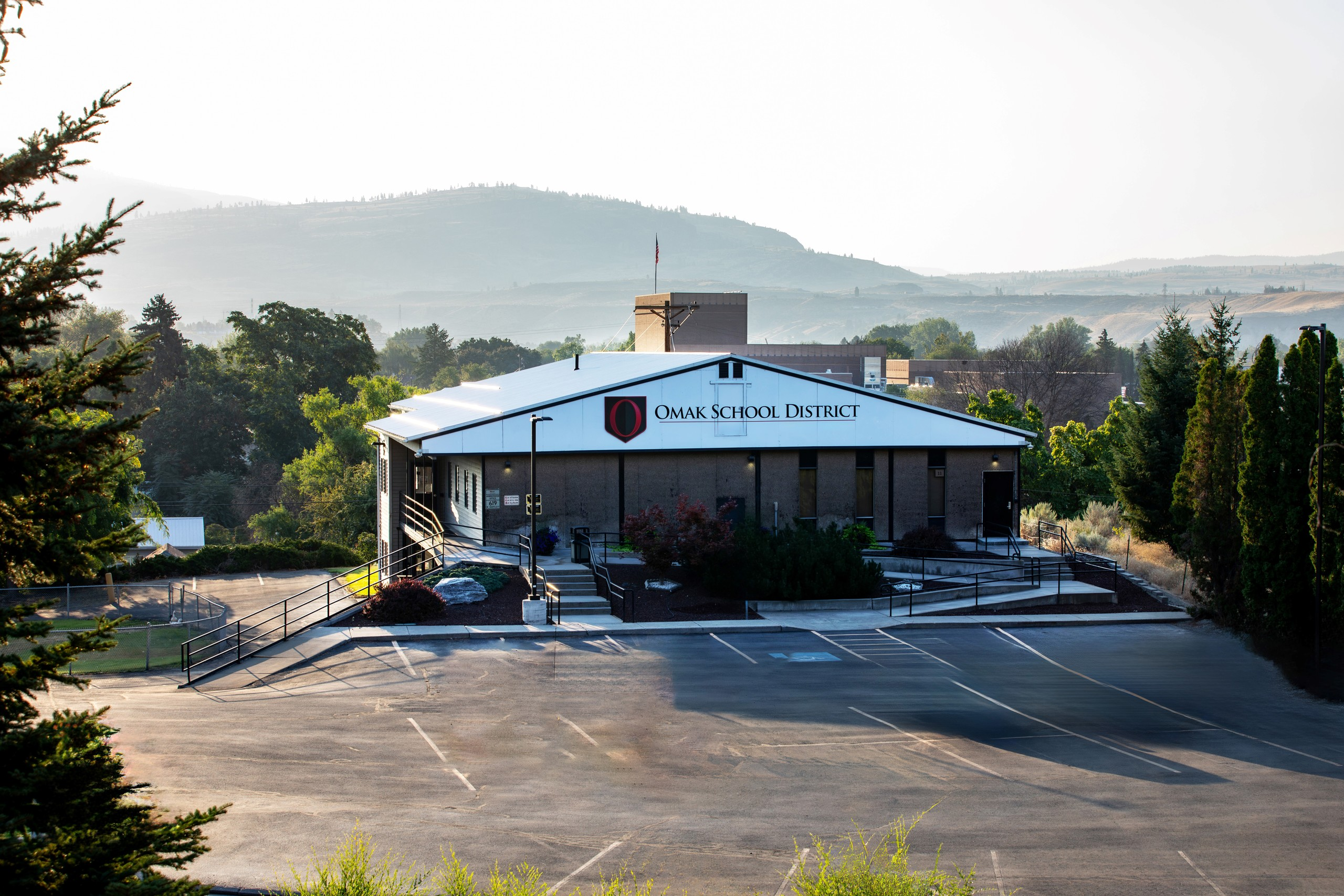
The main office for Omak School District.

In February 2010, Omak became the third settlement in Washington to have a virtual school. During the 2010–11 year, Washington Virtual Academy Omak Elementary, Washington Virtual Academy Omak Middle School, and Washington Virtual Academy Omak High School had a combined enrollment of 969 pupils. The private Omak Adventist Christian School, which operates outside of Omak School District, had 16 pupils in 2011. It is affiliated with the nearby General Conference of the Seventh-day Adventist Church. The Veritas Classical Christian School has also operated in the Omak region.

The Omak Public Library, managed by NCW Libraries (formerly North Central Regional Library), was established in 1956 under provisions of state law passed by the City of Omak. The library is open daily, except on Sundays in the summer season. The community college, Wenatchee Valley College, maintains a campus in Omak, which had an enrollment increase of 19 percent between the 2009–10 and 2010–11 educational seasons. Located approximately 95 miles (153 km) from the main campus in Wenatchee, it was established in the 1970s, and offers adult education classes and two-year associate degrees. Based in Toppenish about 215 miles (346 km) away, Heritage University operates an Omak campus consolidated with Wenatchee Valley College's, providing degrees in several academic subjects.

== Infrastructure ==
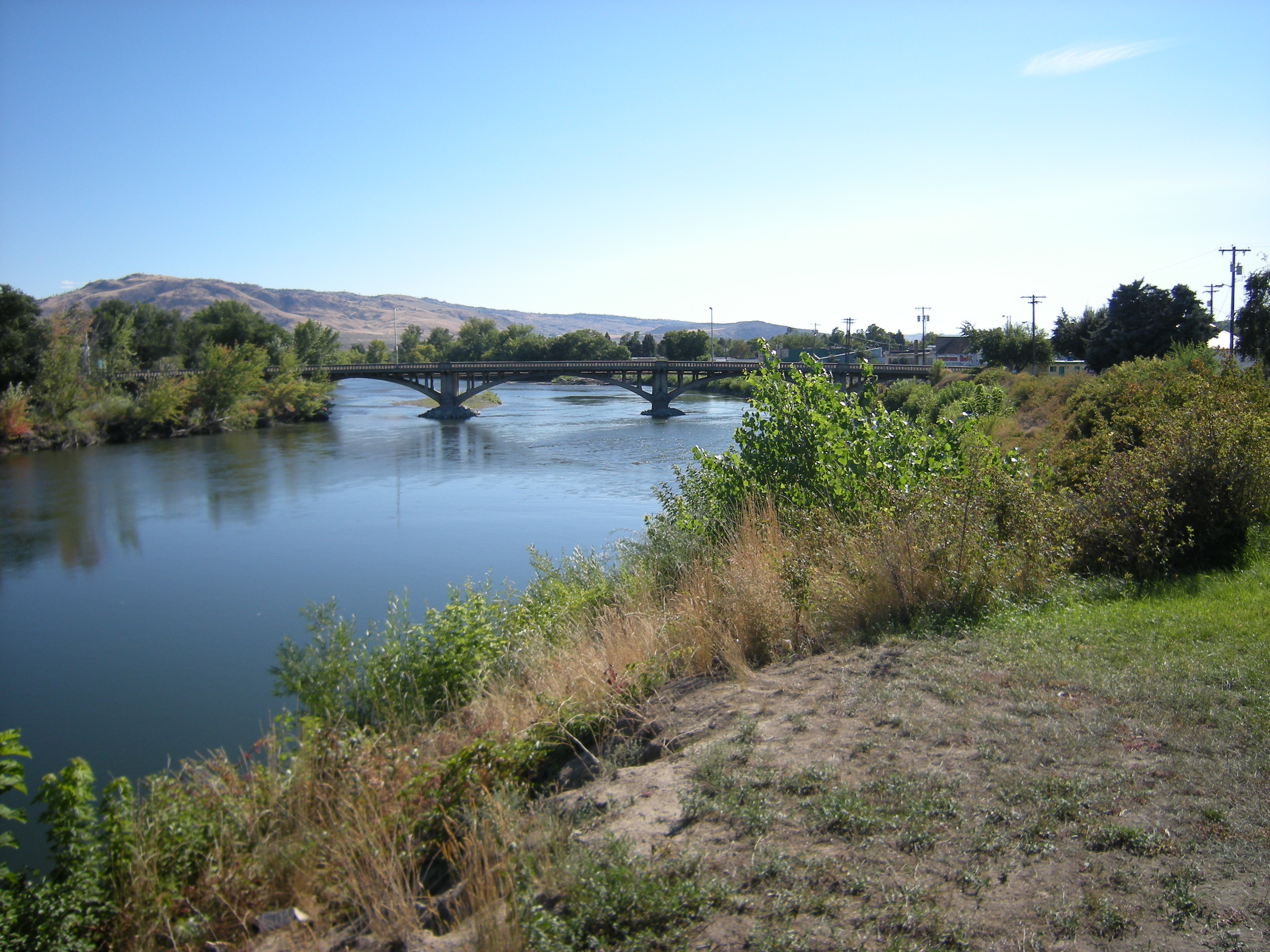
Washington State Route 215 along Omak Avenue as a spur route

The 2010 census estimated that 89.3 percent of residents in Omak commuted to work by automobile; more than the state average of 72.4 percent. Four percent of residents carpooled; fewer than Washington's average. 3.8 percent walked; close to the state average. The median time to travel to work was 11.5 minutes, less than the state average of 25.5 minutes. In the late 1960s, U.S. Route 97 was rerouted to the east and Downtown Omak was bypassed. Large signs located just off U.S. Route 97 promote the city's central business district.

Washington State Route 215 runs north–south through Omak, connecting the city to Okanogan four miles (6.4 km) to the south. U.S. Route 97 and State Route 20 also run north–south through Omak, connecting the municipality to Okanogan 5 miles (8.0 km) south along this route and Brewster 32 miles (51 km) south, Nespelem 35 miles (56 km) southeast is connected to the community by the east–west State Route 155, before it becomes a spur route and continues west along Omak Avenue to terminate into State Route 215. The residential areas are separated from the industrial sector and the highway by backroads near the major highways. Omak's central business district is connected by several spur routes along municipal roads, such as Riverside Drive, Main Street and Okoma Drive.

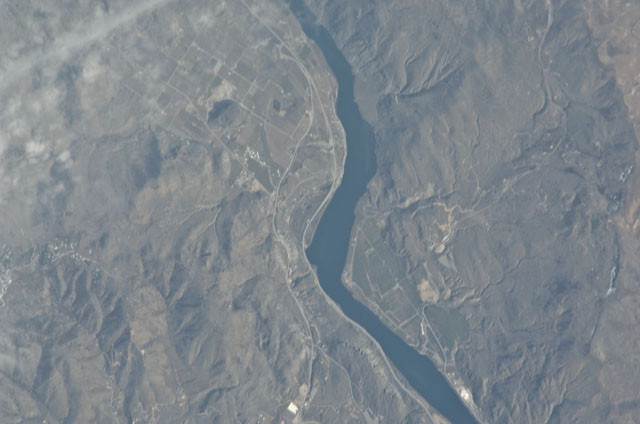
Aerial view of Omak and Okanogan County

Omak has rail, air, and bus services for regional and state transportation. Rail lines from Cascade and Columbia River Railroad enter Omak from Oroville in the north and Wenatchee in the south. The line interchanges with BNSF Railway in the Wenatchee area. The City of Omak operates the general Omak Airport. The paved runway is the third largest in central Washington. The airport provides three daily charter flights, except on Saturdays and Sundays. Wings for Christ Airport and Mid-Valley Hospital EMS Heliport are private aviation ports. The closest commercial airports are located in Penticton and East Wenatchee. Okanogan County Transportation & Nutrition provides bus services in the city, and the federal Amtrak and Greyhound Lines maintain bus stops there.

The 30-bed Mid-Valley Hospital provides medical services, including a 24-hour emergency medical service, ambulance service, nursing care, a birthing center, and a trauma center. The facility employs 10 physicians and dentists, 20 registered nurses and two licensed practical nurses. Established in July 2000, Okanogan Behavioral Healthcare serves the city as an alternative medical facility. Numerous nursing homes, including Rosegarden Care Center, New LifeStyles and The Source for Seniors, operate in Omak. The city's clinic was constructed in 1996 using $4,800,000 of local funds. The City of Omak measures residents' drinking water use and provides storm drains, solid waste, and garbage services since 1984. Residents under 60 are charged a 10 percent utility tax on purchases. Electricity is supplied by Okanogan County Public Utility District, and natural gas by Amerigas.

== Notable people ==
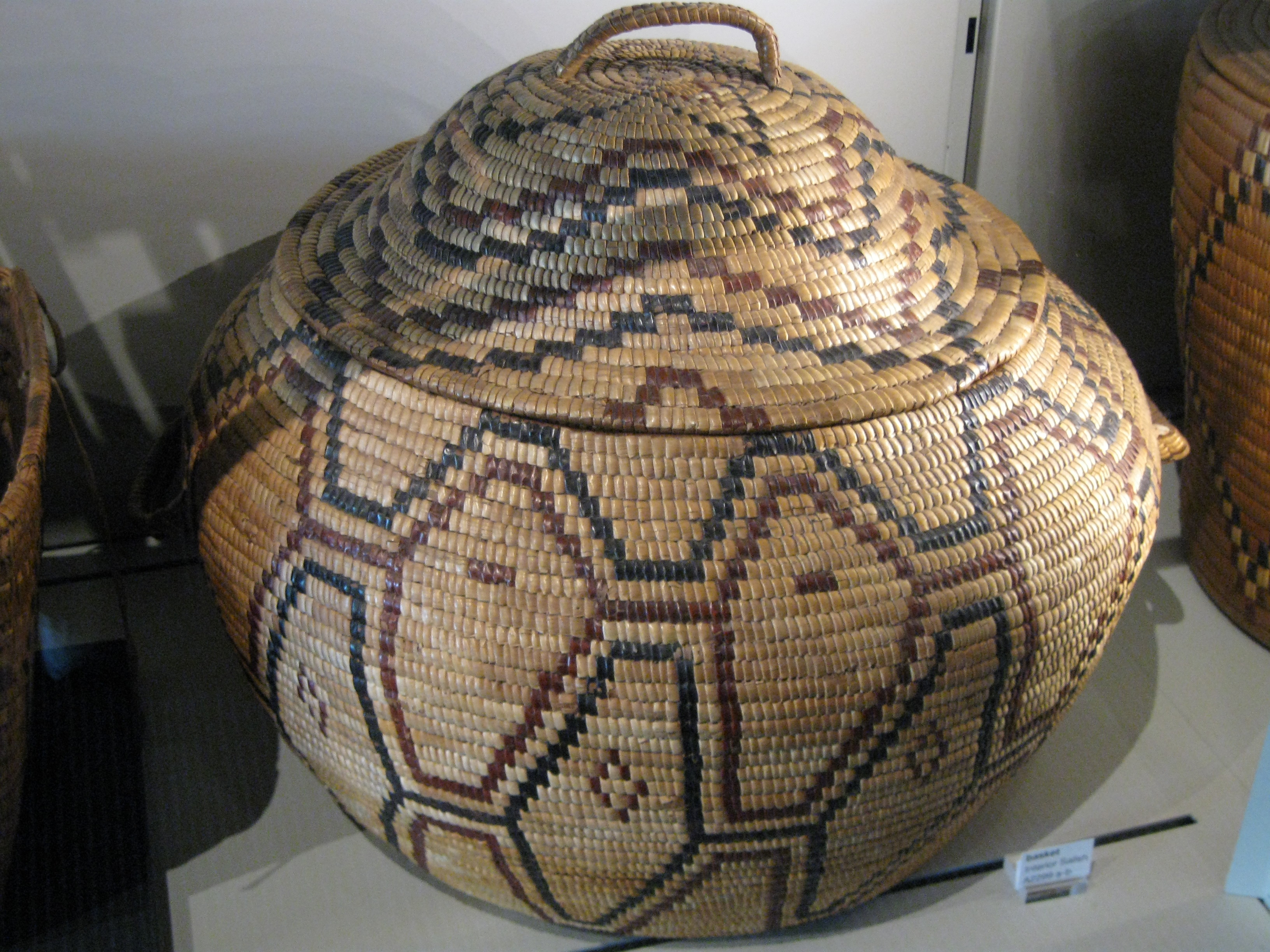
An Interior Salish basket with patterns similar to what Joe Feddersen creates in his work.

- Jag Bains, reality show contestant
- Joe Feddersen, sculptor, painter and photographer of Colville cultures
- Marv Hagedorn, state legislator in Idaho
- Don McCormack, professional baseball player
- William Stephen Skylstad, Roman Catholic Bishop

== International relations ==
According to the Lieutenant Governor of Washington, Omak is a sister municipality with Summerland, British Columbia, a district with a population of 11,280 people according to the 2011 Canadian census. Located on Okanagan Lake in the adjacent Okanagan-Similkameen Regional District, Summerland was incorporated on December 21, 1906, and is located 96 miles (154 km) north of Omak.

== See also ==
- National Register of Historic Places listings in Okanogan County, Washington
