= Washington State Route 213 =

State highway in Okanogan County, Washington, US

State Route 213
- The present route of SR 213 highlighted in red

Route information
- Auxiliary route of SR 20
- Maintained by WSDOT
- Length: 0.35 mi (560 m)
- Existed: 1973–present

Major junctions
- South end: US 97 near Malott
- North end: First Avenue in Malott (temporary); SR 20 near Okanogan

Location
- Country: United States
- State: Washington
- Counties: Okanogan

Highway system
- State highways in Washington; Interstate; US; State; Scenic; Pre-1964; 1964 renumbering; Former
← SR 211	→ SR 215

State Route 213 (SR 213) is the shortest state highway in the U.S. state of Washington. The 0.35-mile-long (0.56 km) unsigned highway serves Malott, a community in Okanogan County. Extending from U.S. Route 97 (US 97) over the Okanogan River via a bridge to First Avenue in Malott, the roadway is semi-complete, as its legislative definition designates that the road should extend to SR 20 southwest of Okanogan. First appearing in a map in 1954, SR 213 originated as a branch of Primary State Highway 16 (PSH 16) in 1959 and later SR 20 Spur in 1964. SR 20 Spur became SR 213 in 1973 because another SR 20 Spur was recently established in Anacortes.

== Route description ==
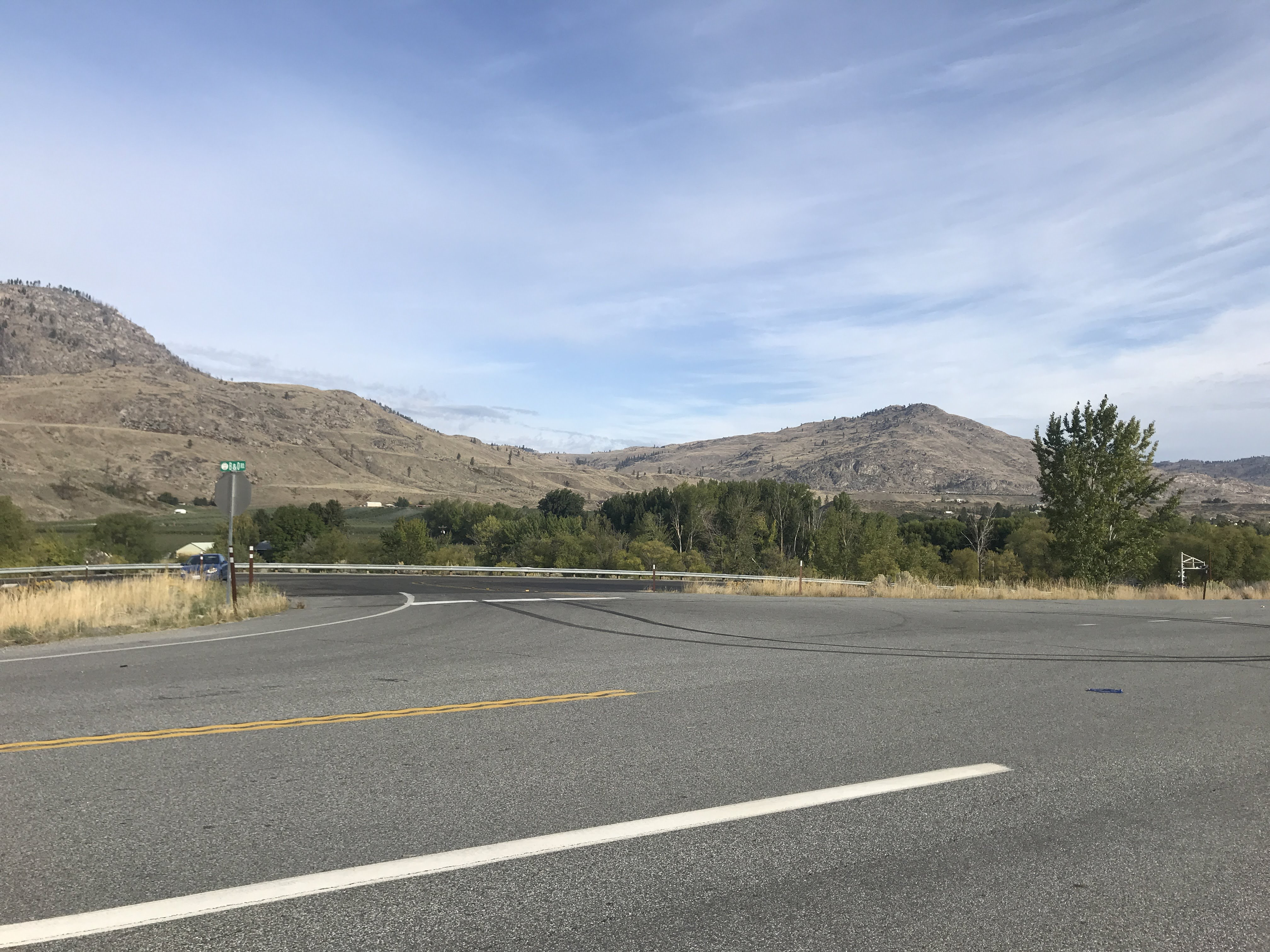
Looking northbound at the southern end of SR 213, where it begins at US 97

SR 213 originates at an intersection with US 97 south of Malott. Traveling northwest and turning northeast, the unsigned roadway crosses the Cascade and Columbia River Railroad and the Okanogan River near the confluence of the Okanogan River and Loup Loup Creek. After crossing the Okanogan River, the highway enters Malott and terminates at First Avenue,. An estimated daily average of 740 motorists utilized SR 213 in 2008.

== History ==
SR 213 originated as a minor road that connected US 97 to the area south of the Okanogan River and Malott; the road first appeared on a map in 1954. In 1959, the Washington State Legislature passed a law that created a branch of PSH 16 that extended from PSH 16 near Okanogan to US 97 in Malott to take effect on July 1, 1961. By 1963, US 97 was realigned south of the Okanogan River and the PSH 16 branch was extended across the river. During a highway renumbering in 1964, PSH 16 became SR 20 and the branch of PSH 16 became SR 20 Spur. In 1973, SR 20 Spur became SR 213, while another SR 20 Spur was established in Anacortes. Beginning in 2008, the Washington State Department of Transportation (WSDOT) has been maintaining a short, 0.35-mile-long (0.56 km) segment of the proposed SR 213 as a state route. As of 2026, WSDOT has no active plans to extend the highway between Malott and SR 20.

== Major intersections ==
The entire highway is in Okanogan County.

Location	mi	km	Destinations	Notes
	0.00	0.00	US 97 – Wenatchee, Omak, Okanogan	Southern terminus
Okanogan River	0.19	0.31	Bridge over Okanogan River	
Malott	0.35	0.56	First Avenue	Temporary northern terminus
1.000 mi = 1.609 km; 1.000 km = 0.621 mi
