= KOMW =

- Omak, Washington; United States
- Frequency: 680 kHz
- Branding: Radio Okanogan 680

Programming
- Format: Adult standards
- Affiliations: Salem Radio Network

Ownership
- Owner: North Cascades Broadcasting, Inc.
- Sister stations: KNCW, KZBE

Technical information
- Licensing authority: FCC
- Facility ID: 49163
- Class: D
- Power: 5,000 watts day
- Transmitter coordinates: 48°23′39.50″N 119°32′04.20″W

Links
- Public license information: Public file; LMS
- Website: komw.net

KOMW (680 AM, "Radio Okanogan 680") is a radio station broadcasting an adult standards music format. Licensed to Omak, Washington, United States, the station is currently owned by North Cascades Broadcasting, Inc. and features programming from Salem Radio Network. This station is a daytimer, signing on at sunrise and signing off at sunset, to protect KNBR in San Francisco, also on 680 kHz.
