= Crawfish Lake (Washington) =

Lake in Okanogan County, Washington, United States

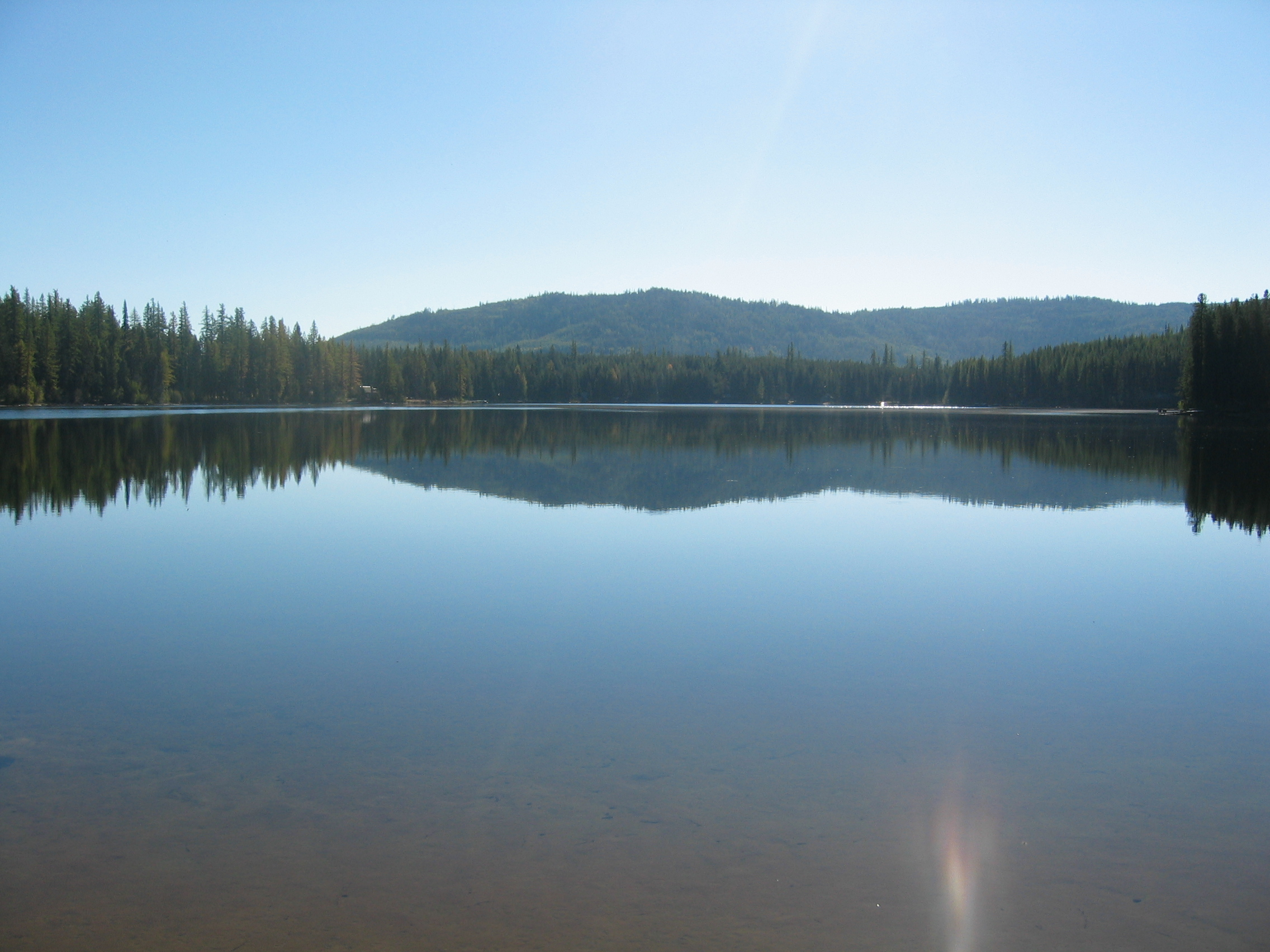

- Location within Washington (state) Location within the United States
- Location: Okanogan County, Washington, United States
- Coordinates: 48°28′55″N 119°12′57″W
- Basin countries: United States
- Max. length: 0.59 mi (0.95 km)
- Max. width: 0.25 mi (0.40 km)
- Surface area: 80 acres (32 ha)
- Max. depth: 36 ft (11 m)
- Surface elevation: 4,475 ft (1,364 m)

Crawfish Lake (48°28′55″N 119°12′57″W) is a small lake located 15 miles (24 km) northeast of Omak, Washington. The lake has a surface area of 80 acres (32.37 ha) and is located at 4,475 ft (1,364 m) above sea level. The northeast portion of the lake borders the Okanogan–Wenatchee National Forest, and the south half is on the Colville Indian Reservation. Most of the property along the shoreline of the lake is privately owned, with a US Forest Service campground occupying the northeast side of the lake. Motors have been prohibited on the lake since 1996. The lake is used mainly for fishing, rowing, canoeing, kayaking and swimming. The lake once contained many crawfish but the state has recently poisoned it to contain the native water reed and thus kill the crawfish.

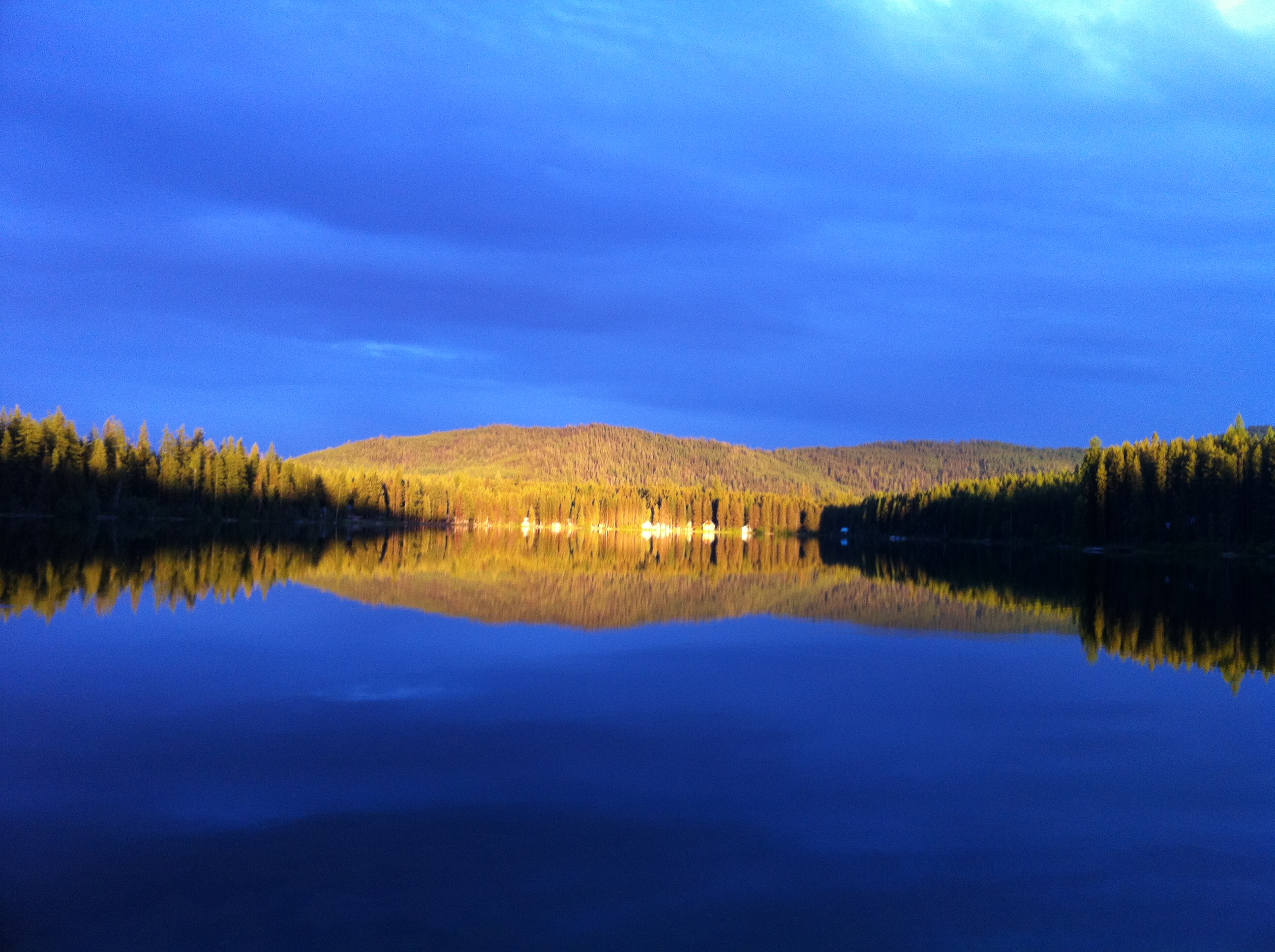
Crawfish Lake on a summer evening
