= Eastside Park (Omak, Washington) =

Park in Omak, Washington, USA

Eastside Park is a park located in Omak, Washington, a city in the Okanogan region of United States. It was significantly improved in 1965.
