= KNCW =

- Omak, Washington; United States
- Frequency: 92.7 MHz

Programming
- Format: Country
- Affiliations: Premiere Networks

Ownership
- Owner: North Cascades Broadcasting, Inc.
- Sister stations: KOMW, KZBE

History
- Former call signs: KOMW (1980–1981); KOMW-FM (1981–1998)
- Call sign meaning: "North Central Washington"

Technical information
- Licensing authority: FCC
- Facility ID: 49164
- Class: C2
- ERP: 4,100 watts
- HAAT: 287.0 meters (941.6 ft)
- Transmitter coordinates: 48°19′12.00″N 119°32′18.00″W
- Repeaters: 95.1 K236AE (Twisp); 95.1 K236AH (Synarep); 99.3 K257DN (Brewster); 101.7 K269AH (Oroville & Tomasket); 107.1 K296ET (Bridgeport)

Links
- Public license information: Public file; LMS
- Website: komw.net/kncw

KNCW (92.7 FM) is a radio station broadcasting a country music format. Licensed to Omak, Washington, United States, the station is currently owned by North Cascades Broadcasting, Inc. and features programming from Premiere Networks.
