= NCW Libraries =

Public library system in Washington

Library logo

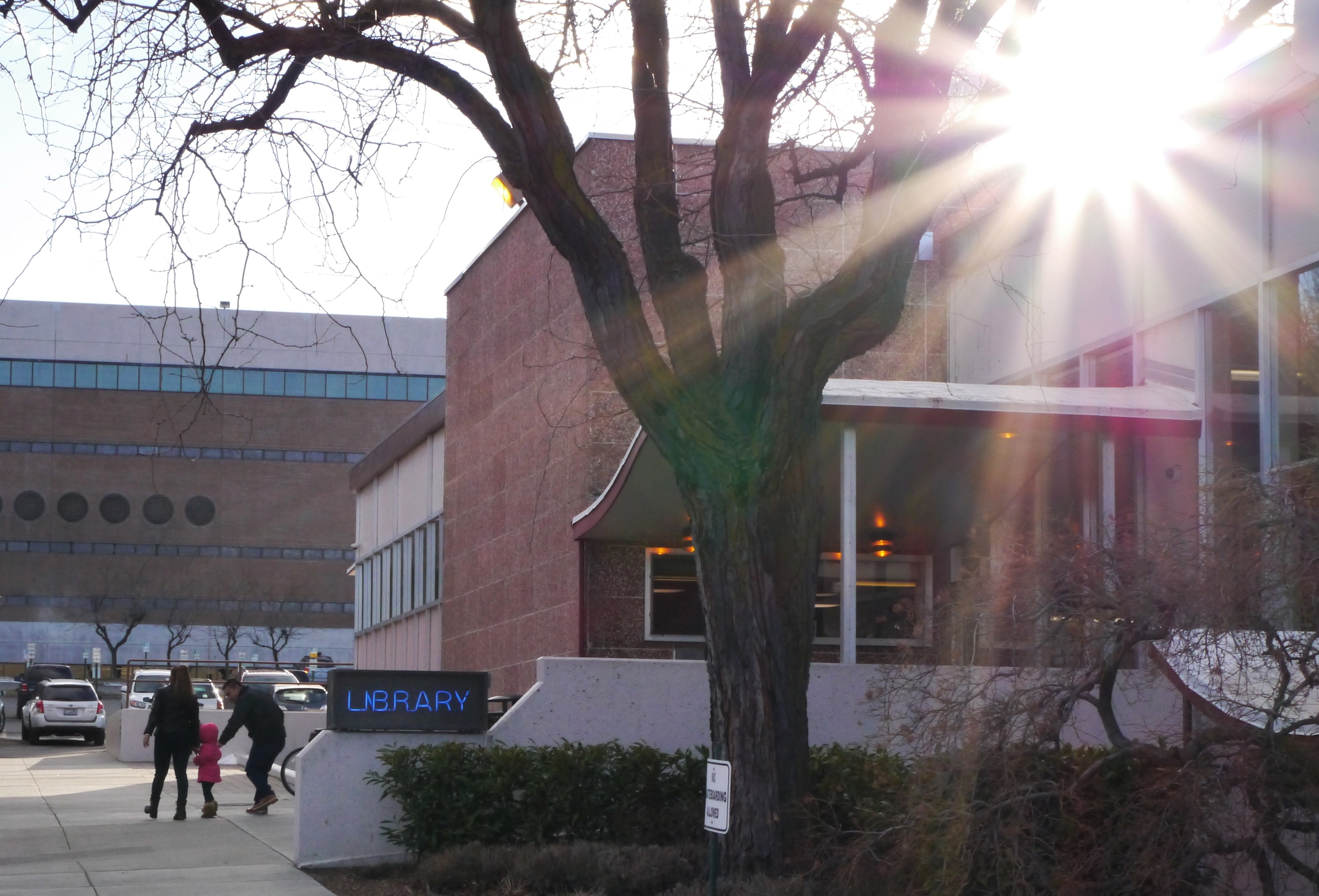
Wenatchee Public Library- front entrance and sign

NCW Libraries is an inter-county rural library district in northern Washington state. It was founded as the North Central Regional Library (NCRL) in 1960 and is headquartered in Wenatchee, Washington. NCW Libraries provides library services to 14,947-square-mile (38,710 km^{2}) of the state, including Chelan, Douglas, Ferry, Grant, and Okanogan counties. The system has 30 branches.

NCW Libraries provides service to its many rural patrons through a mail order catalog—one of the first and last remaining to be deployed in the United States. Materials are sent three times per year via rural postal routes and returned through an included mail label.

The American Civil Liberties Union filed a lawsuit against the NCRL in 2006 over its online content filter, which was upheld in federal court. In 2019, the NCRL announced that it would be renamed to NCW Libraries as part of a rebranding strategy.

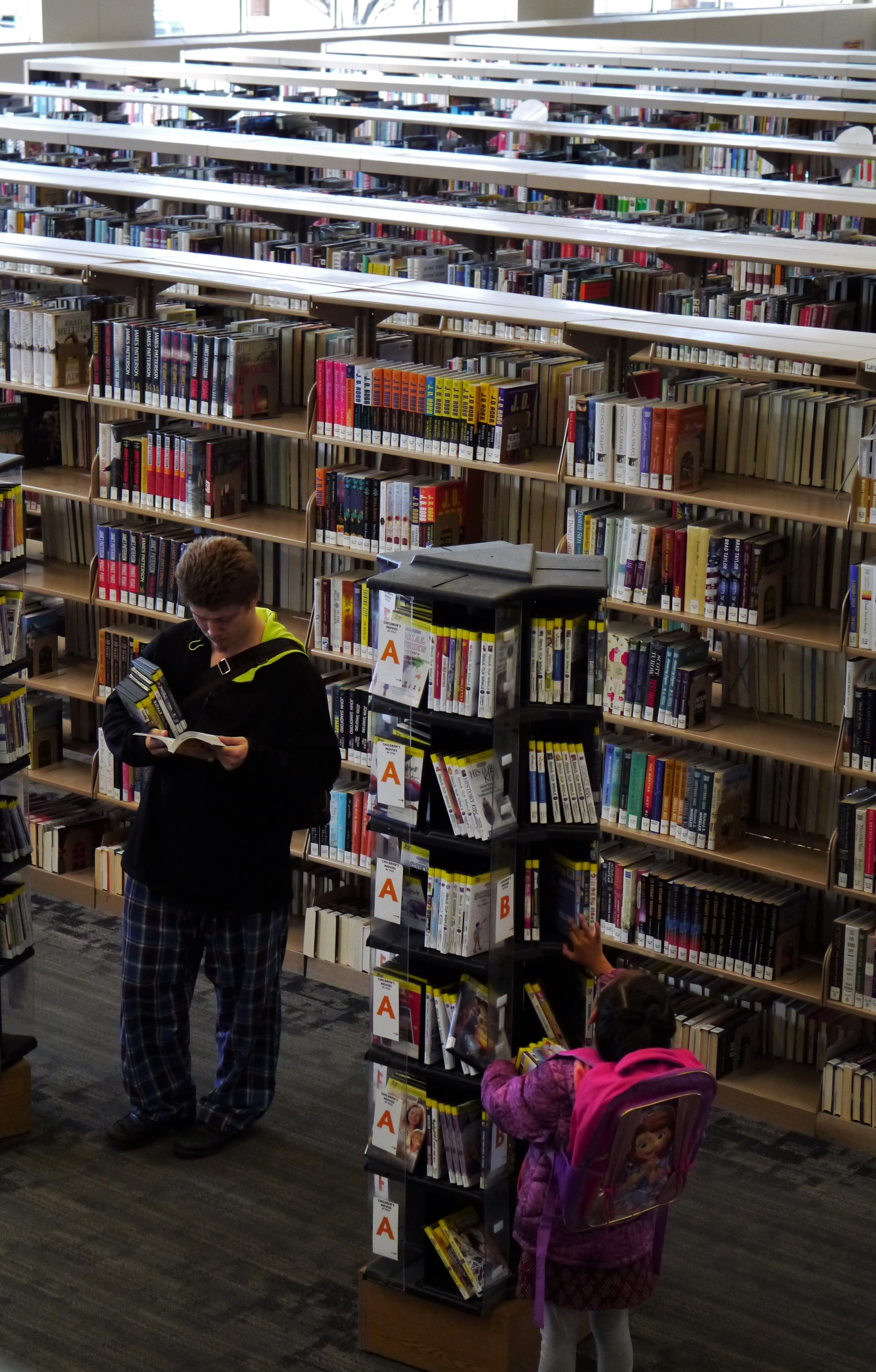
Audio books and videos at the Wenatchee Public Library

== Programs ==
The NCW Libraries Bilingual Outreach Program provides regularly scheduled Spanish/English storytimes at public schools, and other facilities serving children throughout Grant County. In 2003, NCRL received a federal "Serving Cultural Diversity" grant that funded bilingual library materials, a van, and audio listening centers.

In 2004, NCRL directed its first author in residence program to middle-school age children by bringing author Ben Mikaelsen to six middle schools and the Wenatchee Public Library for programs. The program has since expanded with other authors serving libraries and schools throughout the district.

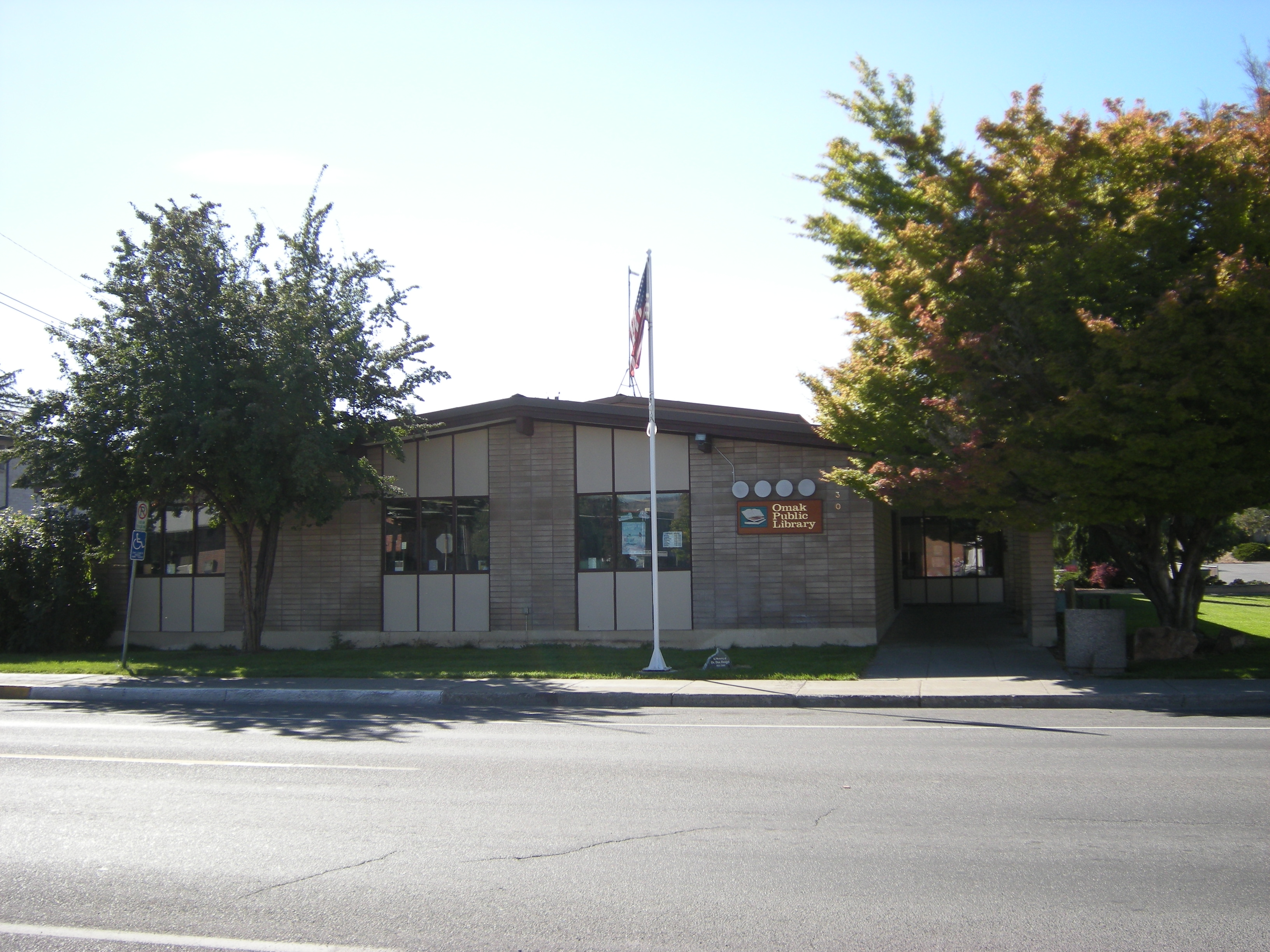
A branch of North Central Regional Library in Omak, Washington

== Branches ==
- Brewster Community Library
- Bridgeport Community Library
- Cashmere Community Library
- Chelan Community Library
- Coulee City Community Library
- Curlew Public Library
- East Wenatchee Community Library
- Entiat Community Library
- Ephrata Community Library
- Grand Coulee Community Library
- Leavenworth Community Library
- Manson Community Library
- Mattawa Community Library
- Moses Lake Community Library
- Okanogan Community Library
- Omak Community Library
- Oroville Community Library
- Pateros Community Library
- Peshastin Community Library
- Quincy Community Library
- Republic Community Library
- Royal City Community Library
- Soap Lake Community Library
- Tonasket Community Library
- Twisp Community Library
- Warden Community Library
- Waterville Community Library
- Wenatchee Public Library
- Winthrop Community Library
