= Suicide Race =

Horse race in Omak, Washington

Coordinates: 48.4136°N 119.5165°W

Location in Washington

The Suicide Race, also promoted as the World Famous Suicide Race, is a horse race in the northwest United States in Omak, Washington. It is part of the Omak Stampede, an annual rodeo in early to mid-August.

First held in 1935, the race is known for the portion of the race where horses and riders run down Suicide Hill, a 62-percent slope that runs for 225 feet (70 m) to the Okanogan River, opposite Eastside Park. Though the race was inspired by Indian endurance races, the actual Omak race was the 1935 brainchild of a local Omak business owner. The race has provoked serious concerns among animal welfare and animals rights groups.

== Description ==
In east Omak and west of the U.S. 97 bridge, the course starts at the top of Suicide Hill on the north bank of the river. The riders have 50 feet (15 m) to get their horses up to full speed before charging down the steep hill and into the river; they cross to the south shore, then sprint a last 500 yards (460 m) to the rodeo arena where the crowd waits. In August, the river is often low enough for the horses to run across. Most riders wear helmets, and all are required to wear life jackets.

Horses and riders have to pass three tests to demonstrate their ability to run in the race and navigate the river: there is an initial veterinarian exam to make sure the horse is physically healthy, a swim test to ensure horses can cross the river, and the hill test where riders ride their horses off the hill at a controlled speed to prove that the animals won't give way to fear at the brink, which can cause a dangerous pile-up.

The riders consist of both cowboys and Indians. In particular, members of the Confederated Tribes of the Colville Reservation, whose reservation includes East Omak and the rodeo grounds, view the race as reminiscent of their traditions as horse warriors.

Many Tribal participants view the race as spiritual, and a cultural-preservation administrator for the tribes has stated that it is the "ultimate demonstration of the rider's ability to become one with the horse." Riders who embrace the spiritual elements of the race pray in sweat lodges and place sacred eagle feathers on their horses.

== History ==
The suicide race was created in 1935 by Claire Pentz, the publicity director of the Omak rodeo, in an effort to promote the rodeo. The race is rooted in nineteenth century Native American endurance races, which were held in on the Colville Indian Reservation in a valley near Keller, which was flooded after construction of the Grand Coulee Dam in the 1930s.

== Animal abuse controversy ==
The event is opposed by several animal rights groups, including the Progressive Animal Welfare Society (PAWS), In Defense of Animals, and The Humane Society, who are against the high level of danger posed to the horses. In the previous 25 years, for example, at least 23 horses have died, including three in 2004 and one in 2012.
