= Chief Joseph Dam =

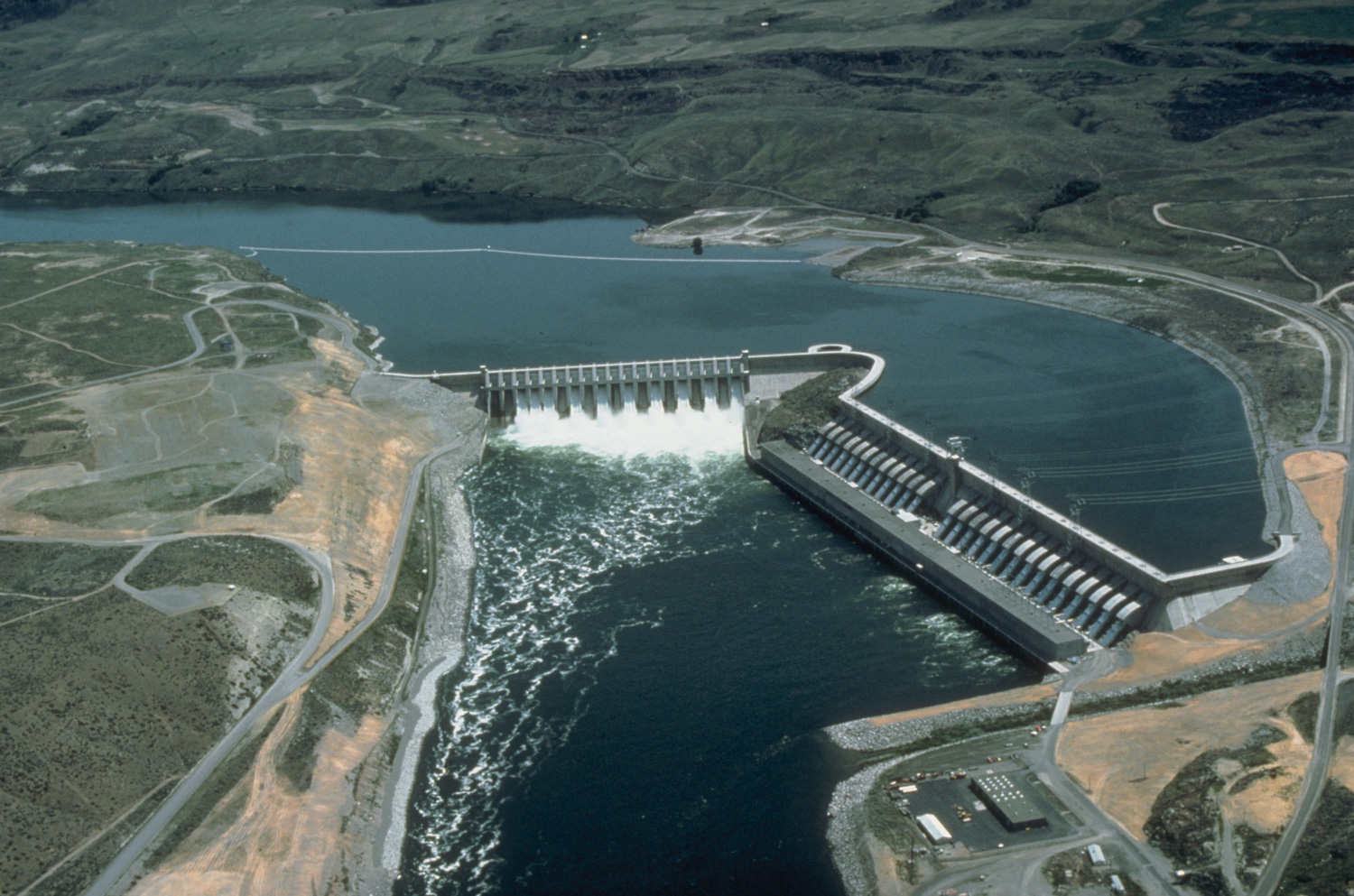
- Interactive map of Chief Joseph Dam
- Location: Douglas and Okanogan counties, Washington, United States
- Coordinates: 47°59′43″N 119°38′00″W
- Construction began: 1949
- Opening date: 1979
- Operators: U.S. Army Corps of Engineers, Seattle District

Dam and spillways
- Type of dam: Concrete-gravity, run-of-the-river
- Impounds: Columbia River
- Height: 236 ft (72 m)
- Length: 5,962 ft (1,817 m)
- Width (crest): 22 ft (7 m)
- Width (base): 164 ft (50 m)
- Spillway type: Service, gate-controlled
- Spillway capacity: 6,030 m^{3}/s (212,947 cu ft/s)

Reservoir
- Creates: Rufus Woods Lake
- Total capacity: 516,000 acre-foot (636,000,000 m^{3})
- Catchment area: 75,400 sq mi (195,285 km^{2})
- Surface area: 13.1 sq mi (34 km^{2})

Power Station
- Operator: USACE
- Type: Hydroelectric
- Turbines: 27 x Francis turbines
- Installed capacity: 2,620 MW
- Capacity factor: 42.6%
- Annual generation: 9,780 GWh (2009)
- Website; U.S. Army Corps of Engineers - Chief Joseph Dam

The Chief Joseph Dam is a concrete gravity dam on the Columbia River, 2.4 km (1.5 mi) upriver from Bridgeport, Washington. The dam is 877 km (545 mi) upriver from the mouth of the Columbia at Astoria, Oregon. It is operated by the USACE Chief Joseph Dam Project Office and the electricity is marketed by the Bonneville Power Administration.

== History ==
The dam was authorized as Foster Creek Dam and Powerhouse for power generation and irrigation by the River and Harbor Act of 1946. The River and Harbor Act of 1948 renamed the project Chief Joseph Dam in honor of the Nez Perce chief who spent his last years in exile on the Colville Indian Reservation. Like the immediate upstream and downstream dams, Chief Joseph does not have any form of fish ladder system installed. Therefore, like Grand Coulee and Wells dam, upstream and downstream respectively, Chief Joseph does not allow the passage of migrating fish.

Construction began in 1950, with the main dam and intake structure completed in 1955. Installation of the initial generating units was started in 1958 and completed in 1961. Ten additional turbines were installed between 1973 and 1979, and the dam and lake were raised 3 m (10 ft), boosting the capacity to 2,620 MW, making Chief Joseph Dam the second largest hydroelectric power producer in the United States. The vast majority (80% on average) of the power from Chief Joseph dam is sent to the Everett area of western Snohomish county via the Bonneville Snohomish substation. However, power produced at the dam is not only used in Washington, but also in Oregon, Montana, Idaho, California, Wyoming, Utah and Nevada.

== Type ==
Chief Joseph Dam is a run-of-the-river dam, which means the lake behind the dam is not able to store large amounts of water. Water flowing to Chief Joseph Dam from Grand Coulee Dam must be passed on to Wells Dam at approximately the same rate. With 27 main generators in the powerhouse, it has the hydraulic capacity of 6,030 m^{3}/s (213,000 cu ft/s).

In the event more water flows to Chief Joseph Dam than could be used for power generation, the spillway gates would be opened to pass the excess water. With an average annual flow rate of 3,058 m^{3}/s (107,992 cu ft/s), the Columbia River seldom exceeds the powerplant's capability to pass water, and spilling of water is infrequent at Chief Joseph Dam.

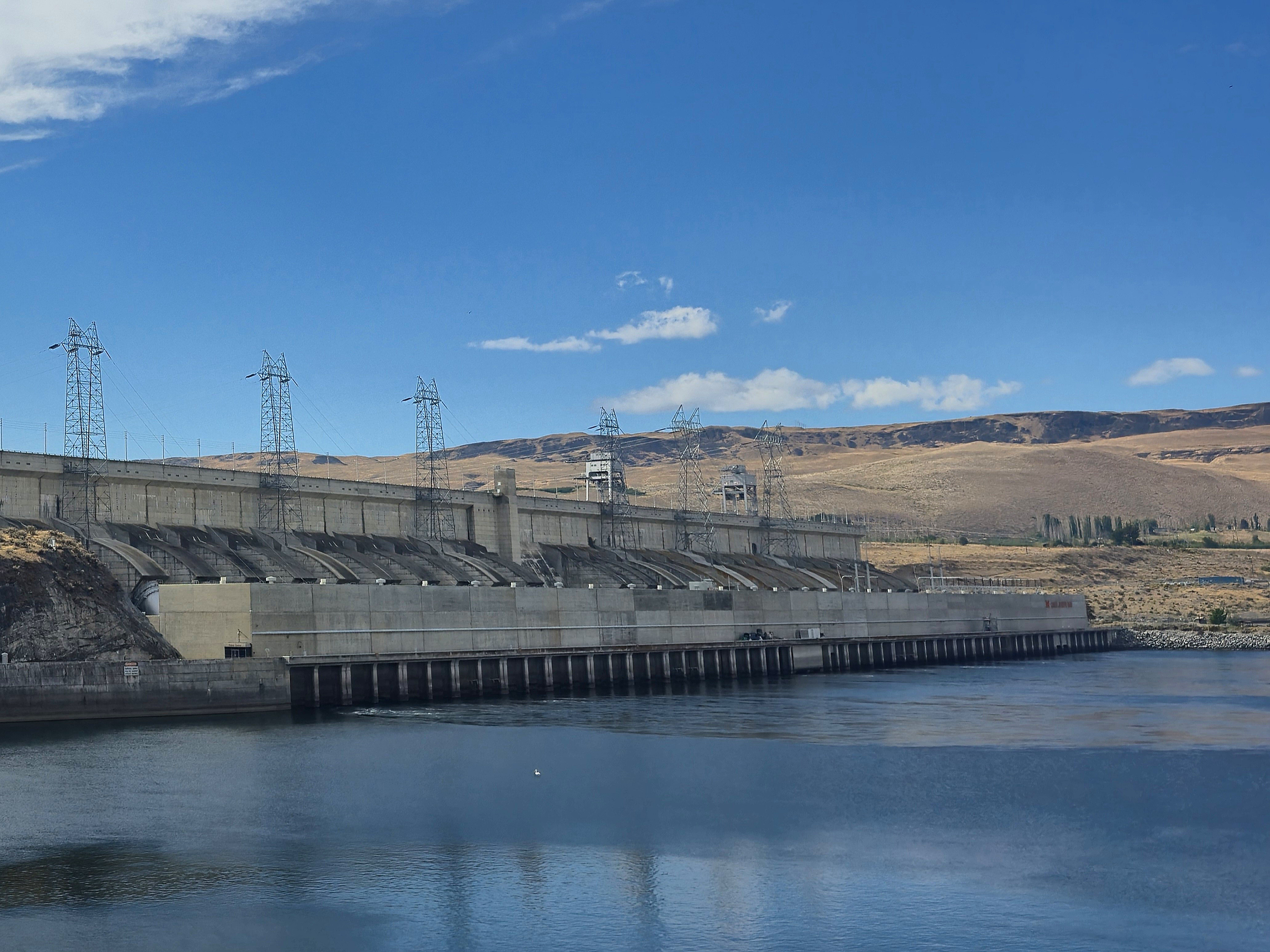
The powerhouse of Chief Joseph dam, with 230 kV and 525 kV pylons above.

== Reservoir ==
The reservoir behind the dam is named Rufus Woods Lake, and runs 82 km (51 mi) up the river channel. Bridgeport State Park, on the lake, is adjacent to the dam.

== See also ==
- Hydroelectric dams on the Columbia River
- List of power stations in Washington
- List of dams in the Columbia River watershed
- List of largest hydroelectric power stations in the United States
