= KZBE =

- Omak, Washington; United States
- Frequency: 104.3 MHz
- Branding: B-104.3 FM

Programming
- Format: Hot adult contemporary
- Affiliations: Westwood One

Ownership
- Owner: North Cascades Broadcasting, Inc.
- Sister stations: KNCW, KOMW

History
- First air date: June 22, 1998

Technical information
- Licensing authority: FCC
- Facility ID: 31661
- Class: C2
- ERP: 3,500 watts
- HAAT: 299.0 meters (981.0 ft)
- Transmitter coordinates: 48°19′12.00″N 119°32′18.00″W

Links
- Public license information: Public file; LMS
- Website: www.komw.net/stations/kzbe/

KZBE (104.3 FM, "B-104.3 FM") is a radio station broadcasting a hot adult contemporary music format. Licensed to Omak, Washington, United States, the station is currently owned by North Cascades Broadcasting, Inc. and features programming from Westwood One.
