= Osoyoos Lake Veteran's Memorial Park =

State park in the U.S. state of Washington

Coordinates: 48.949607°N 119.432843°W

Osoyoos Lake State Park was a Washington state park in Okanogan County until it was sold to the city of Oroville and renamed Osoyoos Lake Veteran's Memorial Park. The park has a 300-foot (91 m) sandy beach on Osoyoos Lake, boat ramp, and campground.
