= Bridgeport State Park =

State park in Washington State, United States

- Location within Washington (state) Location within the United States
- Interactive map of Bridgeport State Park
- Location: Okanogan County, Washington, United States
- Coordinates: 48°00′44″N 119°37′01″W
- Area: 622 acres (252 ha)
- Elevation: 994 ft (303 m)
- Established: 1955
- Administrator: Washington State Parks and Recreation Commission
- Visitors: 99,229 (in 2024)
- Website: Official website

Bridgeport State Park is a public recreation area located two miles east of Bridgeport, Washington, on the north shore of Rufus Woods Lake, the Columbia River reservoir created by the Chief Joseph Dam. The state park was built through a partnership between Washington State Parks and the Army Corps of Engineers after completion of the dam in 1955. The park's 25-year lease was renewed in 1990 and again in 2015. The 622-acre (252 ha) park includes 7,500 feet (2,300 m) of shoreline, camping areas, four miles (6.4 km) of hiking trails, and facilities for boating, fishing, swimming, and golf.
