= Mid-Valley Hospital =

Geography
- Location: 810 Jasmine St, Omak, Washington, United States
- Coordinates: 48°23′48″N 119°32′47″W

Organization
- Type: Community

Services
- Beds: 25

History
- Founded: 1966

Links
- Website: www.mvhealth.org
- Lists: Hospitals in Washington state

Mid-Valley Hospital is a 25-bed community hospital in Omak, Washington. The District, alongside Mid-Valley Clinic, (RHC) provides acute care and clinical services to patients in Omak and surrounding areas. The services include hospital inpatient and outpatient general surgery, emergency room, obstetrics, rehabilitation, primary care, orthopedic surgery, and the related ancillary procedures (lab, anesthesia, x-ray, therapy, etc.) associated with those services.

== Services ==
Hospital services: Dietary/ Nutrition, Emergency/ Trauma Services, Laboratory Services, Pharmacy, Radiology (MRI, CT, Ultrasound, Mammograms, X-Ray), Respiratory Therapy, Swing Bed, OBGYN/ Birthing Center, Geriatrics, Cardiolite & Stress Studies, Telemedicine.

General surgery: Abdominoperineal resection-lap & open, Abdominoperineal resection-lap & open, Adrenalectomy-laparoscopic, Anal fistulectomy, Appendectomy-laparoscopic, Breast lump, fna, excision, Cholecystectomy-laparoscopic, Circumcision for adults, Colon resection-laparoscopic & open, Distal pancreatectomy, Endoscopy (upper and lower), Excision of cysts, lipomas, skin lesions, Hemorrhoids, Hernia repair-all types-laparoscopic & open, Hernia repair for kids-open, Hydrocele (as a secondary procedure), Liver bx, Low anterior resection after rectal eus, Lymph node biopsy, Lysis of abdominal adhesions, Modified radical mastectomy, Nissan fundoplication-laparoscopic, Panniculectomy/abdominoplasty, Paracentesis, Parathyroidectomy, Pilonidal cyst i&d, excision, Portacath placement and removal, Sentinel node biopsy, Skin graft, Splenectomy-laparoscopic & open, Temporal artery biopsy, Thoracic surgery (Vats, pleurodesis, Blebectomy, pleurectomy, Thoracentesis), Thyroid bx, Thyroid nodule fna, Thyroidectomy, Vasectomy, Whipple procedure (in select patients), Zenker's diverticulum.

Clinic services: Family Health Care, Pediatrics, Pain Management, Specialty Care, Mental/ Behavioral Health, Women’s Health OBGYN, X-Ray Services, Lab Services, Wound Care.

Orthopedics

Rehabilitation therapies:  General Orthopedic Rehab (Total Joint, Post-Shoulder Surgery, Post-Spine Surgery, etc.)  Neurological Rehab (Post-Stroke, Traumatic Brain Injury, etc)  L&I Injury  Speech Therapy  Occupational Therapy  Balance Deficits and General Deconditioning  Chronic Pain Conditions  Sports Injury/ Recovery  Repetitive Stress Injury  Ergonomic Assessment/ Needs  Prosthetic Needs Assessments  Wheelchair Needs Assessments  Vestibular Assessment/ Rehab  Hand Therapy .
