= Primary State Highway 6 (Washington) =

Former highway in Washington

Primary State Highway 6
- Pend Oreille Highway, Newport Highway
- PSH 6 highlighted in red

Route information
- Maintained by Washington DoH
- Length: 114.79 mi (184.74 km)
- Existed: 1937–1964
- History: Originally State Road 23 in 1915, State Road 6 in 1923, US 195 in 1926, US 2 in 1948

Major junctions
- South end: PSH 3 / US 2 / US 395 in Spokane
- SSH 6-B near Diamond Lake US 2 in Newport; SSH 6-B in Usk SSH 6-A in Tiger
- North end: Highway 6 at Canada–US border near Metaline Falls

Location
- Country: United States
- State: Washington

Highway system
- State highways in Washington; Interstate; US; State; Scenic; Pre-1964; 1964 renumbering; Former
| ← PSH 5 | → PSH 7 |

Primary State Highway 6 (PSH 6) was a Washington state highway in the older primary and secondary system that existed from 1937 until 1964 in Spokane and Pend Oreille counties. The road ran from an intersection with PSH 3, U.S. Route 2 (US 2, formerly US 195 and US 10 Alternate) and US 395 in Spokane north to British Columbia Highway 6 (BC 6) at the Canada–US border near Metaline Falls, passing its branch route and two secondary routes.

PSH 6 was originally named State Road 23 in 1915 and ran from Spokane to Newport until it was extended to the Canada–US border in 1921. State Road 23 was renumbered to State Road 6 and later co-signed with US 195 from Spokane to Newport in 1926. In 1937, the primary and secondary system was created, renumbering State Road 6 to PSH 6 and creating two branch routes and two secondary routes, Secondary State Highway 6A (SSH 6A) and SSH 6B. US 195 was later replaced with US 2 when it was expanded west in 1946 and later was decommissioned in 1964, when a new system, the sign routes (later state routes) were introduced. PSH 6 was divided into US 2 from Spokane to Newport and State Route 31 (SR 31) from Newport to Canada as part of the new system.

== Route description ==
Primary State Highway 6 (PSH 6) began at a 3-way junction with PSH 3, co-signed with U.S. Route 2 (US 2) and US 395, formerly with US 195 and US 10 Alternate, north of Downtown Spokane. From the junction, the highway became co-signed with US 2 (formerly US 195 and US 10 Alternate and traveled northeast to intersect what was US 2 prior to 1955 in Mead. The roadway then turned north, paralleling railroad tracks that belonged to the Great Northern Railway (now owned by BNSF Railway), which it would parallel to Newport. At Colbert, an overpass over the road served another Great Northern Railway line where the current BNSF Railway left PSH 6; from Colbert, the roadway passed Chattaroy and Milan before it left Spokane County to enter Pend Oreille County.

Once in Pend Oreille County, the highway curved northeast past Secondary State Highway 6B (SSH 6B) and Diamond Lake, which also has a community named after the lake, into Newport. In Newport, the road turned north and intersected its branch route, which connected east to Idaho and US 2 left to become co-signed with the branch. After US 2 left, PSH 6 once again turned northwest along the Pend Oreille River and a former route of the Chicago, Milwaukee, St. Paul and Pacific Railroad (now the Pend Oreille Valley Railroad) to Usk, where SSH 6B was intersected again. From Usk, the roadway continued north past Cusick, Locke, Jared and Ruby to Tiger, where SSH 6A branched off the highway and traveled west to Colville. The road traveled through Ione and Metaline to Metaline Falls, the terminus of the railroad and the last major community on the roadway until the Canada–US border. PSH 6 bridged the Pend Oreille River at Metaline Falls and traveled north to the Canada–US border, where it became British Columbia Highway 6 (BC 6). The southern terminus in Spokane was the busiest section of the highway in 1960, with a daily average of 4,850 motorists; the busiest section in Pend Oreille County was at Newport city limits with a daily average of 2,150 motorists in 1960.

== History ==
PSH 6 and its predecessors were co-signed with US 2 (left) from 1946 until 1964, while being co-signed with US 195 (right) from 1926 until 1964; both highways are pictured with the original U.S. route shields.

PSH 6 was first established in 1915 as State Road 23 (SR 23) on a Spokane–Tiger route, which would be extended to the Canada–US border in 1921. In 1923, the road became SR 6 and was co-signed with U.S. Route 195 (US 195) from Spokane to Newport in 1926 during the creation of the U.S. routes. During the creation of the Primary and secondary state highways in 1937, SR 6 became PSH 6 and two secondary highways along with a short branch were created. A roadway extending from Colville (PSH 3) to Tiger (PSH 6) became Secondary State Highway 6A (SSH 6A), a short bypass of Newport became SSH 6B and a short connector to US 195 in Idaho within Newport became the branch. In 1946, US 2 was also co-signed onto the highway, replacing US 10 Alternate, which had used the same route before 1946. The Washington State Legislature introduced a new system of highways in 1964 that replaced the Primary and secondary highways, including PSH 6. PSH 6 was replaced by US 2 from Spokane to Newport and State Route 31 (SR 31) from Newport to the Canada–US border; SSH 6A became SR 294; SSH 6B became SR 311 and the branch became US 2. SR 20 was later extended over SR 294 and SR 31 between Newport and Tiger in 1973; SR 311 was renumbered to SR 211 in 1975.

== Branch ==
PSH 6 had only one branch that ran 0.27 miles (0.43 km) long within Newport. The road started at PSH 6 and went east, co-signed with U.S. Route 2 (US 2) and US 195, to the Idaho state line, which also was an intersection with Idaho State Highway 41 (SH-41). The branch was designated in 1937 during the creation of the Primary and secondary system and became co-signed with US 195 in 1926 and US 2 in 1946, the former was later shortened south to Spokane by 1979.

== Secondary State Highways ==
=== SSH 6A ===
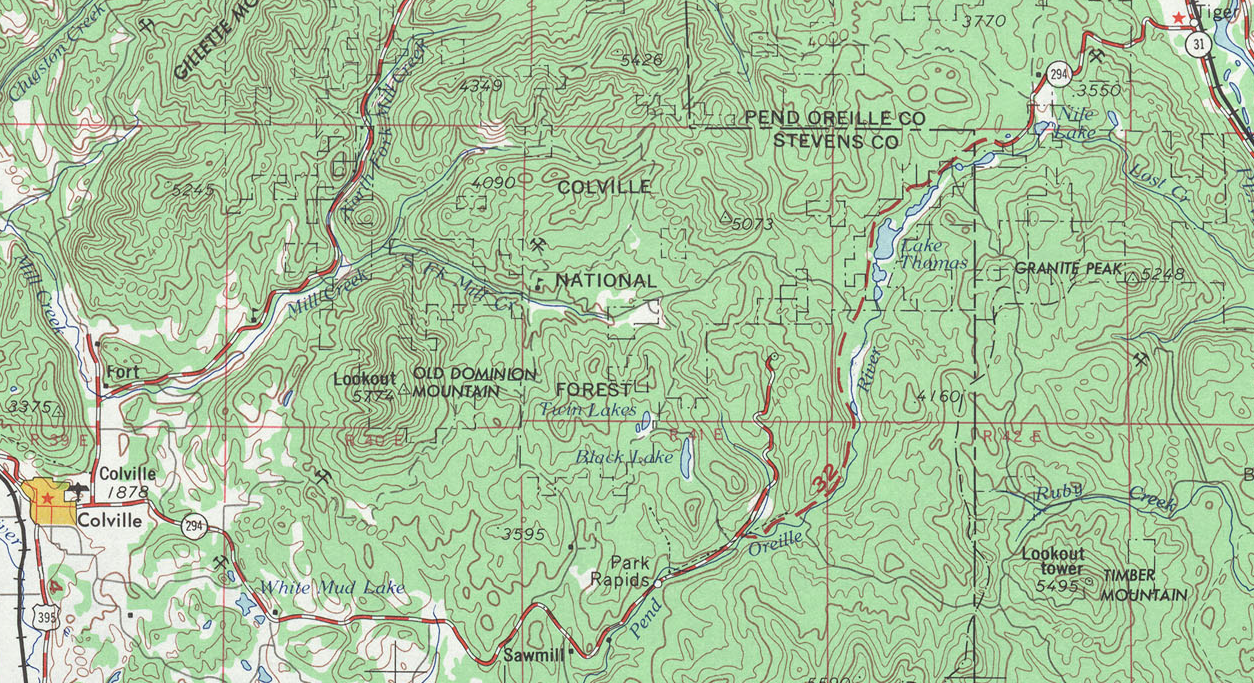
A map in 1966 of SR 294 (the successor of SSH 6A) showing the gap between the radar station and the Pend Oreille County line.

The 35.73-mile (57.50 km) long SSH 6A began at PSH 3, co-signed with US 395, in Colville, the county seat of Stevens County. From Colville, the highway passed the Colville Municipal Airport, a Dolomite mine and a sawmill before paralleling Pend Oreille Creek and passing the 41,568-acre (168.22 km^{2}) Little Pend Oreille National Wildlife Refuge. From the wildlife refuge, the roadway paralleled the shoreline of Lake Thomas into Pend Oreille County and passed another mine to end at PSH 6 in Tiger. The road, named the Colville–Tiger Road, was established in 1937, even though a segment extending from a radar station south of Lake Thomas to the Pend Oreille County line wasn't built until after 1966. During the 1964 highway renumbering, SSH 6A became SR 294, which became SR 20 in 1973. The busiest segment on the highway was east of Colville with a daily average of 1,400 in 1960.

=== SSH 6B ===
SSH 6B began its 15.28-mile (24.59 km) long route at PSH 6, co-signed with US 2 west of Diamond Lake, which also has a community named after the lake. From Diamond Lake, the highway traveled north past Davis Lake to end at PSH 6 in Usk, a community south of Cusick. The roadway was established in 1937 and became SR 311 during the highway renumbering in 1964, which became SR 211 in 1975. The busiest segment on the highway was the southern terminus near Diamond Lake, with a daily average of 600 in 1960.

== Major intersections ==
| County | Location | mi | km | Destinations | Notes |
|---|---|---|---|---|---|
| Spokane | Spokane | 0.00 | 0.00 | PSH 3 (Inland Empire Highway) / US 2 west / US 195 south / US 395 – Walla Walla, Pullman, Yakima | Southern end of US 2 / US 195 concurrency |
| Pend Oreille | | 28.43 | 45.75 | SSH 6-B north – Usk | |
| Pend Oreille | Newport | 41.35 | 66.55 | US 2 east (PSH 6 branch) / US 195 north – Oldtown, Idaho | Northern end of US 2 / US 195 concurrency |
| Pend Oreille | Usk | 56.86 | 91.51 | SSH 6-B south | |
| Pend Oreille | Tiger | 87.85 | 141.38 | SSH 6-A west (Tiger–Colville Road) – Colville | |
| Pend Oreille | | 114.79 | 184.74 | Highway 6 at the Canada–United States border | |
1.000 mi = 1.609 km; 1.000 km = 0.621 mi: Concurrency terminus

=== Branch intersections ===
The branch was located entirely in Newport, Pend Oreille County.

| mi | km | Destinations | Notes |
|---|---|---|---|
| 0.00 | 0.00 | PSH 6 (Newport Highway) / US 2 west / US 195 south – Spokane, Usk, Ione | Western terminus |
| 0.27 | 0.43 | US 2 east (Albeni Highway) / US 195 north / SH-41 south (State Street) – Oldtown, Sandpoint, Bonners Ferry | Eastern terminus |
1.000 mi = 1.609 km; 1.000 km = 0.621 mi

=== SSH 6A intersections ===
| County | Location | mi | km | Destinations | Notes |
|---|---|---|---|---|---|
| Stevens | Colville | 0.00 | 0.00 | PSH 3 (Inland Empire Highway) / US 395 – Kettle Falls, Spokane, Pasco | Western terminus |
| Pend Oreille | Tiger | 35.73 | 57.50 | PSH 6 north (Newport Highway) – Spokane, Usk, Ione | Eastern terminus |
1.000 mi = 1.609 km; 1.000 km = 0.621 mi

=== SSH 6B intersections ===
The branch was located entirely in Pend Oreille County.

| Location | mi | km | Destinations | Notes |
|---|---|---|---|---|
| | 0.00 | 0.00 | PSH 6 south (Newport Highway) / US 2 west – Spokane, Newport, Everett | Southern terminus |
| Usk | 15.28 | 24.59 | PSH 6 north (Newport Highway) – Cusick, Ione, Metaline | Northern terminus |
1.000 mi = 1.609 km; 1.000 km = 0.621 mi

== See also ==
- Primary State Highways (Washington)
