= Washington State Route 31 =

State highway in Pend Oreille County, Washington, US

State Route 31
- SR 31 highlighted in red

Route information
- Maintained by WSDOT
- Length: 26.79 mi (43.11 km)
- Existed: 1964–present
- Tourist routes: International Selkirk Loop; North Pend Oreille Scenic Byway

Major junctions
- South end: SR 20 in Tiger
- North end: Highway 6 at the Canadian border near Metaline Falls

Location
- Country: United States
- State: Washington
- County: Pend Oreille

Highway system
- State highways in Washington; Interstate; US; State; Scenic; Pre-1964; 1964 renumbering; Former
← SR 28	→ SR 35

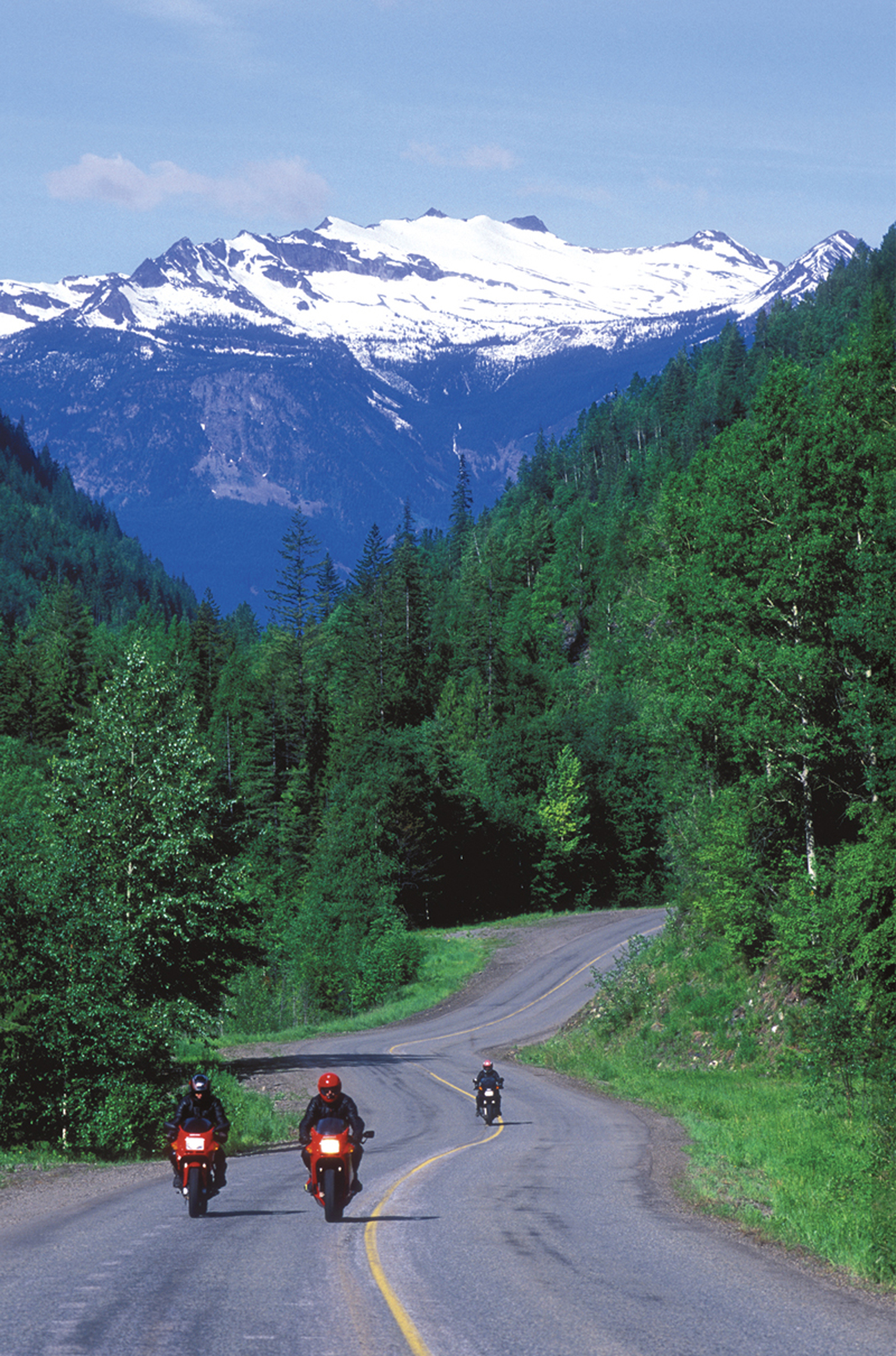
A section of Washington State Route 31 in Colville National Forest.

State Route 31 (SR 31) is a Washington state highway located entirely in Pend Oreille County. The highway, which is 26.79 miles (43.11 km) long, starts at an intersection with SR 20 in Tiger and travels north to the Canada–US border north of Metaline Falls. At the border, SR 31 becomes British Columbia Highway 6 (BC 6). The route parallels the Pend Oreille River for most of its route and the primary functions of the highway is to serve and connect Tiger, Ione, Metaline and Metaline Falls with British Columbia.

Before 1964, the route from Newport to BC 6 was the northernmost section of Primary State Highway 6, which ran from Spokane to BC 6. Originally created in 1964, SR 31 extended southeast to an intersection with U.S. Route 2 (US 2, formerly US 195) in Newport. The North Cascades Highway (SR 20) was extended to Newport in 1973 and SR 31 from Newport to Tiger became SR 20. SR 31 had one auxiliary route, SR 311, which became SR 211 after SR 20 was extended.

== Route description ==
State Route 31 (SR 31) is 26.79 miles (43.114 km) long within Pend Oreille County, Washington from SR 20 in Tiger north to British Columbia Highway 6 (BC 6) at the Canada–US border, located north of Metaline Falls. The highway parallels the Pend Oreille River for most of its route and connects Tiger, Ione, Metaline and Metaline Falls with British Columbia. The route also parallels the Pend Oreille Valley Railroad from Tiger to Metaline Falls; the railroad extends south to Newport along SR 20 and east to Dover, Idaho.

SR 31 starts at an intersection with SR 20 and Tiger East Road in the small community of Tiger. The road turns northwest after the intersection and then curves north after intersecting Vogel Road. After crossing the railroad, the highway forms the eastern boundary of Ione Municipal Airport and later passes Sullivan Lake Road. At the Sullivan Lake Road junction, SR 31 is named McKay Road and crosses the Ione Millpond to enter the city of Ione. There, the route is renamed Second Street and leaves the city to parallel the Pend Oreille Valley Railroad and the shoreline of the Pend Oreille River. The name of the road changes to Lehigh Avenue, a name that stays with SR 31 until the Canada–US border. The railroad crosses the road and later bridges the Pend Oreille River, as the highway turns northwest and reverts northeast. The route reaches Metaline and curves southeast to cross the Pend Oreille River on the Pend Oreille Bridge into Metaline Falls. After turning south and back north, the highway starts to curve multiple times until intersecting Sullivan Lake Road and being directed northeast. The road turns north and crosses two streams before curving northwest and then northeast to Lake Lucerene. After passing Lake Lucerene, SR 31 passes Crescent Lake and Boundary Lake before ending at the Canada–US border. SR 31's northern end at the Canada–US border is the easternmost crossing in Washington and is located east of Crawford State Park.

== History ==
=== Pre–SR 31 (1923–1964) ===
The shield of PSH 6 (1937–1964)

In 1923, a system of roads to connect cities throughout Washington was established. One of the roads, State Road 6, followed a route from Spokane to the Canada–US border. The road was named the Pend O'Reille Highway, a name that would identify the route until 1964. The state road system was later expanded into a new system in 1937.

During the creation of the Primary and Secondary Highways in 1937, the road that was State Road 6 became Primary State Highway 6 (PSH 6). PSH 6 ran from U.S. Route 10 (US 10) and US 195 (future US 2), north to the Canada–US border; the route was co-signed as US 195 from Spokane to Newport. US 2 was signed over PSH 6 from Spokane to Newport in 1948 and the route became SR 31 from Newport to the Canada–US border during the 1964 highway renumbering. During the renumbering, WSDOT replaced the previous system of Primary and Secondary Highways with a new system called state routes, which is still in use today.

=== SR 31: Newport–BC 6 (1964–1973) ===
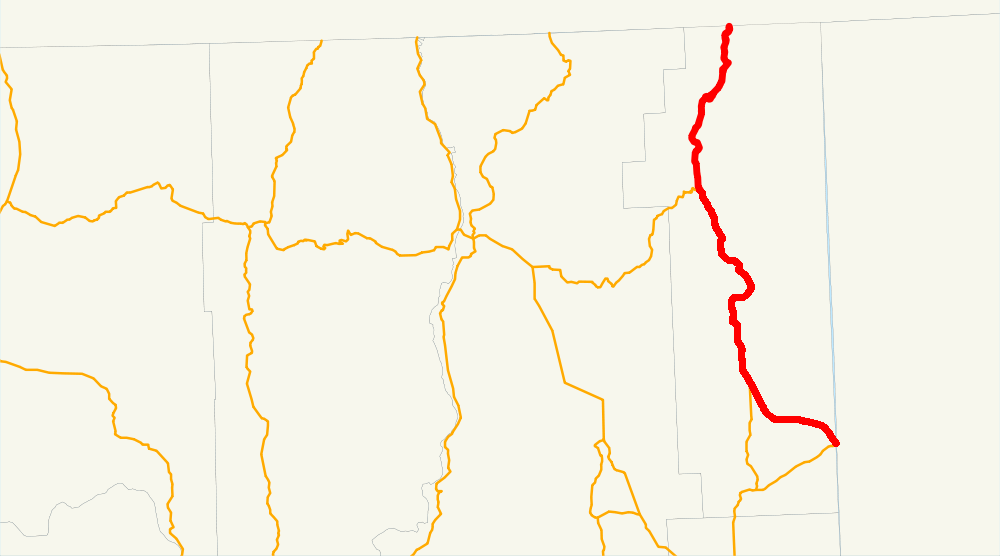
SR 31's route from 1964 until 1973

SR 31's previous route ran a total of 73.31 miles (117.98 km) from Newport northwest to Tiger and north to the Canada–US border at BC 6. The route started in Newport at the intersection of W. Walnut Street (SR 31 northbound and US 2 eastbound) and N. Union Avenue (US 2 westbound). Next, the highway went northwest and left Newport to parallel the Pend Oreille River for the rest of its route. The road would also join the Pend Oreille Valley Railroad north to the current southern terminus. SR 31 turned west and passed Lake Newport State Park, located on the shores of the river, before curving northwest and entering the community of Dilkena. From Dilkena, the road goes north to pass SR 311's northern terminus in Usk and pass the towns of Cusick, Locke and Jared. The highway turned east at Jared and back northwest at Ruby. After Blue Slide and Lost Creek, SR 31 would continue north out of Tiger, which was the eastern terminus of SR 294. SR 31 from Newport to Tiger later became SR 20 after it was extended on SR 294 and SR 31 in 1973.

==== SR 311 (1964–1973) ====
Former SR 311's shield that identifies the route.

From 1964 until 1973, SR 31 had an auxiliary route called State Route 311. The highway ran from US 2 west of Newport, north 15.24 miles (24.53 km) to SR 31 in Usk. The road was entirely located within Pend Oreille County; the southern terminus was located east of Pend Oreille State Park on US 2 and west of Diamond Lake and the community of the same name. SR 311 advanced north past Sacheen Lake and Davis Lake to the northern terminus, which was 2.39 miles (3.85 km) south of Cusick. SR 311 was established as SSH 6B in 1937 during the creation of the primary and secondary highway system. In the 1964 renumbering, SR 311 was created over SSH 6B. When SR 20 was extended over SR 294 and SR 31, SR 311 became SR 211, which it is still currently designated as.

== Major intersections ==
The entire highway is in Pend Oreille County.

Location	mi	km	Destinations	Notes
Tiger	0.00	0.00	SR 20 (North Cascades Highway) – Newport, Colville, Republic	Southern terminus; former SR 294
	26.79	43.11	Highway 6	Northern terminus at Canada–United States border
1.000 mi = 1.609 km; 1.000 km = 0.621 mi
