= Washington State Route 211 =

State highway in Pend Oreille County, Washington, US

State Route 211

- Map of Pend Oreille County in northeastern Washington with SR 211 highlighted in red

Route information
- Auxiliary route of SR 20
- Maintained by WSDOT
- Length: 15.18 mi (24.43 km)
- Existed: 1975–present

Major junctions
- South end: US 2 near Diamond Lake
- North end: SR 20 in Usk

Location
- Country: United States
- State: Washington
- Counties: Pend Oreille

Highway system
- State highways in Washington; Interstate; US; State; Scenic; Pre-1964; 1964 renumbering; Former
| ← SR 207 | → SR 213 |

State Route 211 (SR 211) is a Washington state highway located in Pend Oreille County. The 15.18-mile (24.43 km) long route that begins at an intersection with U.S. Route 2 (US 2) east of Diamond Lake. The highway extends north to end at SR 20 in Usk, a small community south of Cusick. The roadway serves as a bypass of Newport. The route originally was established as Secondary State Highway 6B (SSH 6B) in 1937. SSH 6B was later renumbered to SR 311 in 1964 during the highway renumbering. After SR 20 was extended east over SR 31, the highway was renumbered to SR 211.

== Route description ==
State Route 211 (SR 211) begins its 15.18 miles (24.43 km) of highway at an intersection with U.S. Route 2 (US 2), a major west–east route, west of Diamond Lake. After the intersection, the road travels northwest to Sacheen Lake and north to Deer Valley before continuing northbound to Davis Lake. After Davis Lake, the road intersects Westside Kalispel Road and advances north to its terminus at SR 20 in Usk, located south of Cusick. North of the US 2 intersection, an estimated 2,200 motorists utilized Lewis Street daily based on annual average daily traffic (AADT) data collected by the Washington State Department of Transportation.

== History ==
The shield of SR 311, which was SR 211 from 1964 until 1975.

SR 211 was originally established as Secondary State Highway 6B (SSH 6B) in 1937, during the creation of the Primary and secondary highway system; the highway ran from U.S. Route 195 (US 195) to Primary State Highway 6 (PSH 6). US 195 later became US 2 in 1948, as part of a westward expansion. The Washington State Legislature renumbered and changed the system in 1964, PSH 6 became SR 31 and SSH 6B became SR 311. SR 20 was later extended east over the route of SR 31 in 1973 and SR 311 was renumbered to SR 211 in 1975.

== Major intersections ==
The entire highway is in Pend Oreille County.

| Location | mi | km | Destinations | Notes |
|---|---|---|---|---|
| | 0.00 | 0.00 | US 2 – Spokane, Newport | Southern terminus |
| Usk | 15.18 | 24.43 | SR 20 (North Cascades Highway) – Colville, Newport | Northern terminus |
1.000 mi = 1.609 km; 1.000 km = 0.621 mi
