= U.S. Route 2 in Washington =

Highway in Washington

U.S. Route 2
- US 2 highlighted in red

Route information
- Maintained by WSDOT
- Length: 326.34 mi (525.19 km)
- Existed: December 20, 1946–present
- Tourist routes: Cascade Loop Scenic Byway, Stevens Pass Greenway, Coulee Corridor Scenic Byway, International Selkirk Loop

Major junctions
- West end: SR 529 in Everett
- I-5 in Everett; US 97 in Orondo; I-90 / US 395 in Spokane
- East end: US 2 at Idaho state line in Newport

Location
- Country: United States
- State: Washington
- Counties: Snohomish, King, Chelan, Douglas, Grant, Lincoln, Spokane, Pend Oreille

Highway system
- United States Numbered Highway System; List; Special; Divided; State highways in Washington; Interstate; US; State; Scenic; Pre-1964; 1964 renumbering; Former
| ← SR 971 | → SR 3 |

U.S. Route 2 (US 2) is a component of the United States Numbered Highway System that connects the city of Everett in the U.S. state of Washington to the Upper Peninsula of Michigan, with a separate segment that runs from Rouses Point, New York, to Houlton, Maine. Within Washington, the highway travels on a 326-mile-long (525 km) route that connects the western and eastern regions of the state as a part of the state highway system and the National Highway System. US 2 forms parts of two National Scenic Byways, the Stevens Pass Greenway from Monroe to Cashmere and the Coulee Corridor Scenic Byway near Coulee City, and an All-American Road named the International Selkirk Loop within Newport.

US 2 begins in Everett at an intersection with State Route 529 (SR 529) in Everett and travels east to an interchange with Interstate 5 (I-5). The highway travels over the Cascade Range through Stevens Pass, connecting the western and eastern parts of the state. US 2 becomes concurrent with US 97 from Peshastin to Orondo, crossing the Columbia River in Wenatchee on the Richard Odabashian Bridge. The highway continues east across the Columbia Plateau in Central Washington and crosses the Grand Coulee while concurrent with SR 17 west of Coulee City. The highway travels into Spokane concurrent with I-90 and US 395 and leaves both highways continuing northeast to Newport. US 2 leaves Washington at the Idaho state line, located along SR 41 in Newport and Idaho State Highway 41 (ID-41) in Oldtown, Idaho.

The present route of US 2 follows several wagon roads that were built in the late 19th century by local railroad companies, including the Stevens Pass Highway along the Skykomish River. The state of Washington began maintaining sections of what would become US 2 with the extension of State Road 7 in 1909, from Peshastin to Spokane on the Sunset Highway and later State Road 2. In addition to State Road 2, State Road 23 was created in 1915, traveling north from Spokane to Newport, and was renumbered to State Road 6 in 1923. The Stevens Pass Highway was transferred to state maintenance in 1931 with the establishment of State Road 15, traveling from Everett to Peshastin. The United States Highway System was adopted on November 11, 1926, and designated US 10 on the future route of US 2 from Peshastin to Spokane and US 195 from Spokane to Newport. US 10 was re-routed in 1939 and replaced by US 10 Alternate, which was routed across Stevens Pass in the 1940s and itself replaced by US 2 in 1946. The primary state highways were replaced by the current state route system during the 1964 state highway renumbering, and US 2 replaced its three concurrent routes. US 2 underwent conversions to limited-access highways during the next several decades, including the completion of the Hewitt Avenue Trestle and a bypass of Snohomish. A series of projects is planned to improve the US 2 corridor between Snohomish and Skykomish by expanding the highway near various cities and the completion of a bypass around Monroe.

== Route description ==
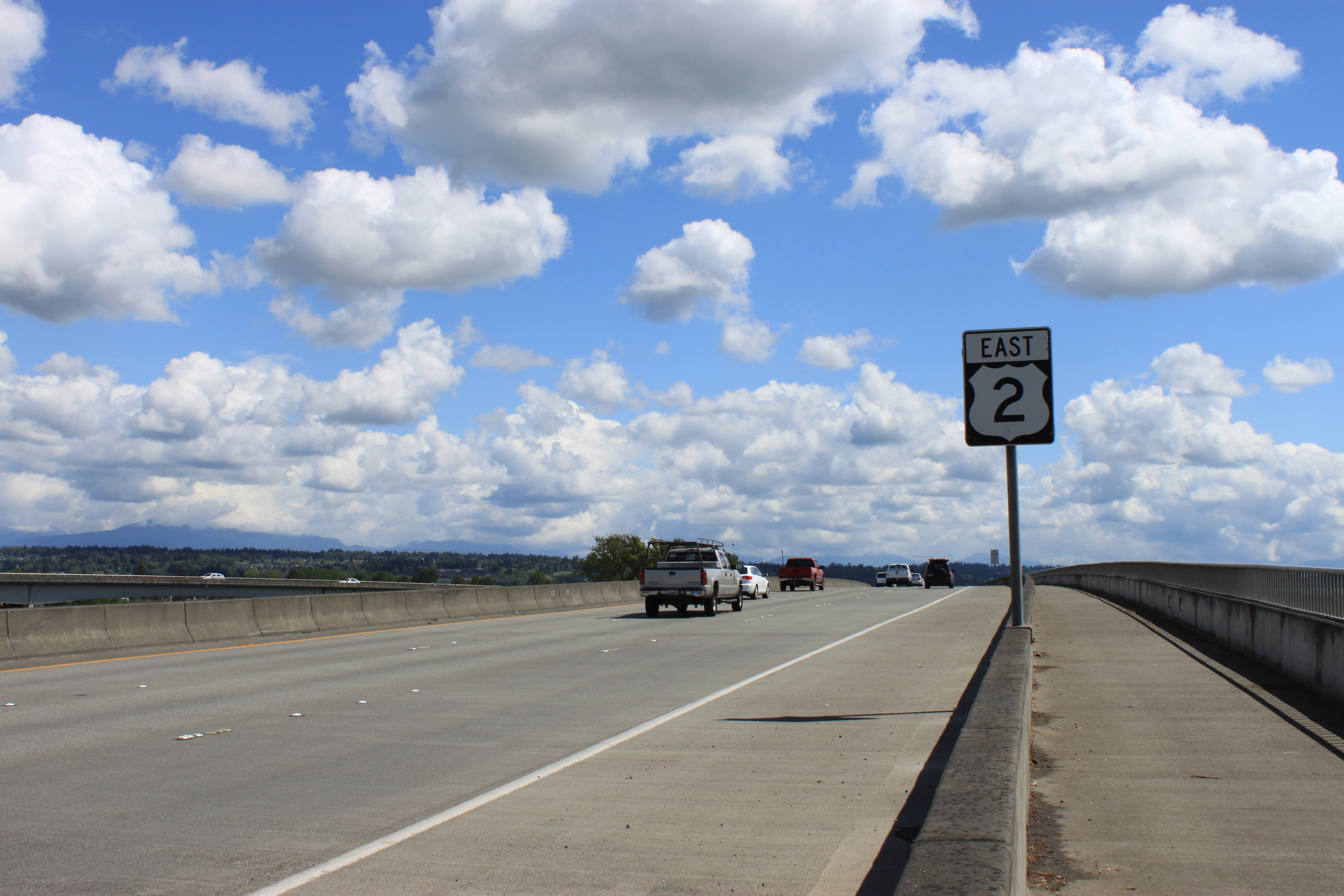
A reassurance shield on the Hewitt Avenue Trestle, carrying US 2 over the Snohomish River between Everett and Ebey Island.

US 2 is defined by the Washington State Legislature as SR 2, part of the Revised Code of Washington as §47.17.005. Every year, WSDOT conducts a series of surveys on its highways in the state to measure traffic volume. This is expressed in terms of annual average daily traffic (AADT), which is a measure of traffic volume for any average day of the year. In 2013, WSDOT calculated that the busiest section of US 2 within Washington was the Hewitt Avenue Trestle above the Snohomish River east of Everett, carrying over 76,000 vehicles, while the least busiest section of US 2 is in Moses Coulee, carrying 630 vehicles. The entire route of US 2 within Washington is designated as part of the National Highway System, classifying it as important to the national economy, defense, and mobility. WSDOT designates US 2 as a Highway of Statewide Significance, which includes highways that connect major communities in the state of Washington.

US 2 begins in downtown Everett, with its eastbound lanes starting at the intersection of Hewitt Avenue and Maple Street, signed as SR 529, and its westbound lanes ending at the intersection of California Street and Maple Street (SR 529). The highway travels east onto the Hewitt Avenue Trestle, crossing the Snohomish River after an interchange with I-5. The four-lane trestle continues east across Ebey Island, intersecting Homeacres Road before crossing the Ebey Slough. US 2 turns southeast at the east end of the trestle in Cavalero at an interchange with SR 204, which serves Lake Stevens. The limited-access road travels around the city of Snohomish, intersecting Bickford Avenue in an at-grade intersection and SR 9 in a diamond interchange. US 2 turns south and crosses over the Pilchuck River and the Centennial Trail before its limited-access road ends at a diamond interchange with 88th Street. The two-lane road continues southeast along the Scenic Subdivision of the Northern Transcon, a BNSF rail line, into Monroe. The highway travels past the Evergreen State Fairgrounds and intersects SR 522 before entering downtown Monroe.

US 2, now part of a National Scenic Byway named the Stevens Pass Greenway, continues through the city of Monroe and forms the northern terminus of SR 203. The highway leaves the city while parallel to the Skykomish River and travels through the cities of Sultan and Gold Bar. US 2 begins following the South Fork Skykomish River at Index into the Cascade Range, crossing into King County near the town of Baring. The highway enters Mount Baker-Snoqualmie National Forest and continues east along the Tye River past the town of Skykomish and the Cascade Tunnel towards Stevens Pass. The pass, located 4,061 feet (1,238 m) above sea level, is also home to the Stevens Pass Ski Area and a trailhead for the Pacific Crest Trail while serving as the point in which US 2 crosses into the Wenatchee National Forest in Chelan County. The highway continues east down Nason Creek to Coles Corner, the southern terminus of SR 207, which serves Lake Wenatchee. US 2 travels due south along the Wenatchee River valley through Leavenworth before it begins a 27-mile-long (43 km) concurrency with US 97 at a diamond interchange east of Peshastin.

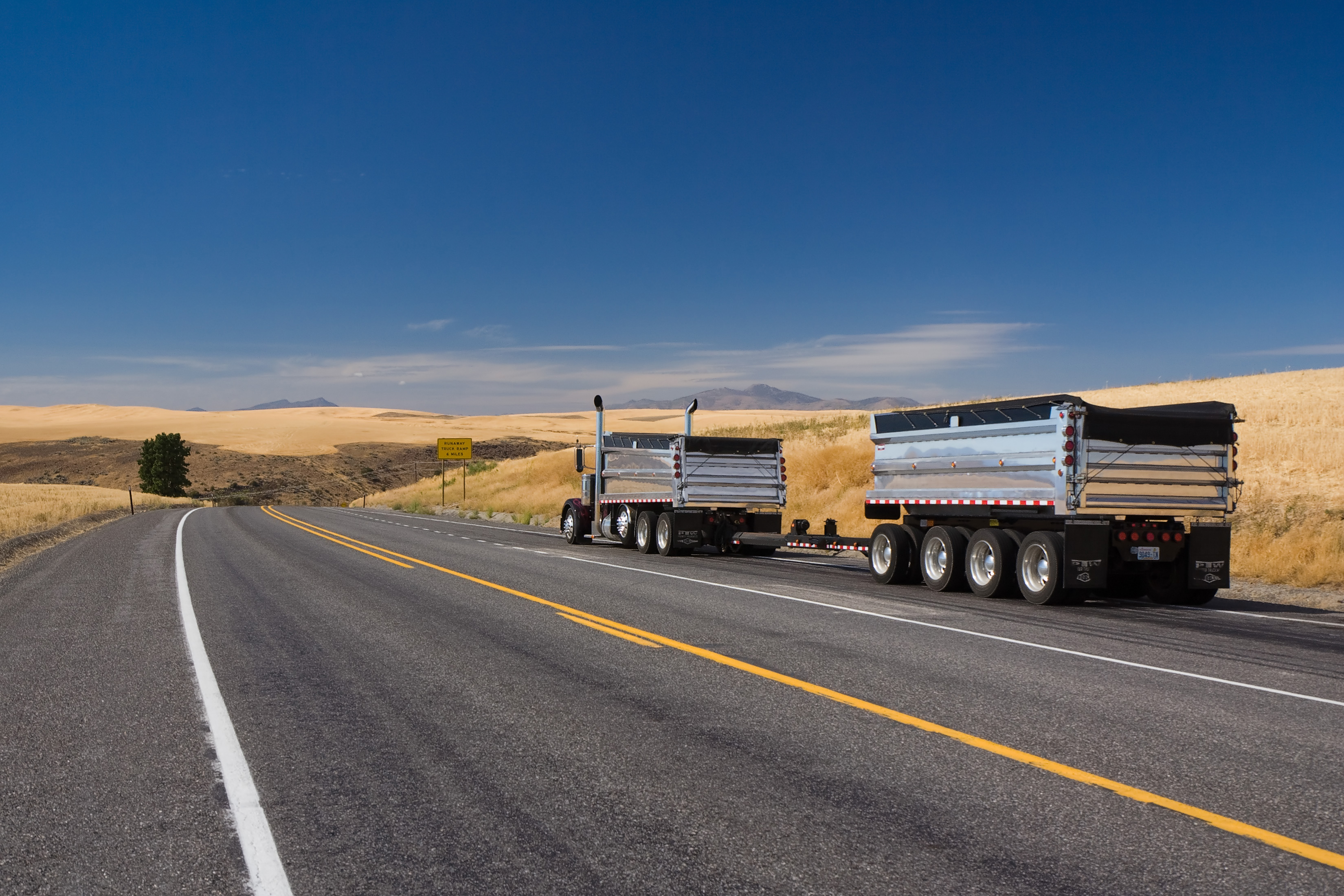
Truck traffic on the Pine Canyon section of US 2 west of Waterville in rural Douglas County.

US 2 and US 97 travel together on a four-lane highway on the north side of the Wenatchee River heading southeast past Cashmere heading towards Wenatchee. The roadway intersects SR 285, a short connector to downtown Wenatchee, and US 97 Alternate, an alternate route to Chelan, in Sunnyslope before crossing the Richard Odabashian Bridge over the Columbia River and into Douglas County. The two highways continue east into East Wenatchee and turn north at the western terminus of SR 28. US 2 and US 97 continue north between the Columbia River to the west and Badger Mountain to the east, passing the Rocky Reach Dam and its reservoir, Lake Entiat before reaching Orondo. US 2 and US 97 split at Orondo, with US 97 continuing north along the Columbia River towards Chelan and US 2 traveling east up Pine Canyon onto the Waterville Plateau. The highway travels through the town of Waterville via several turns on city streets before heading due east across the Columbia Plateau, intersecting SR 172 at Farmer. US 2 becomes concurrent with SR 17 as it descends into the Grand Coulee south of Banks Lake, becoming part of the Coulee Corridor Scenic Byway.

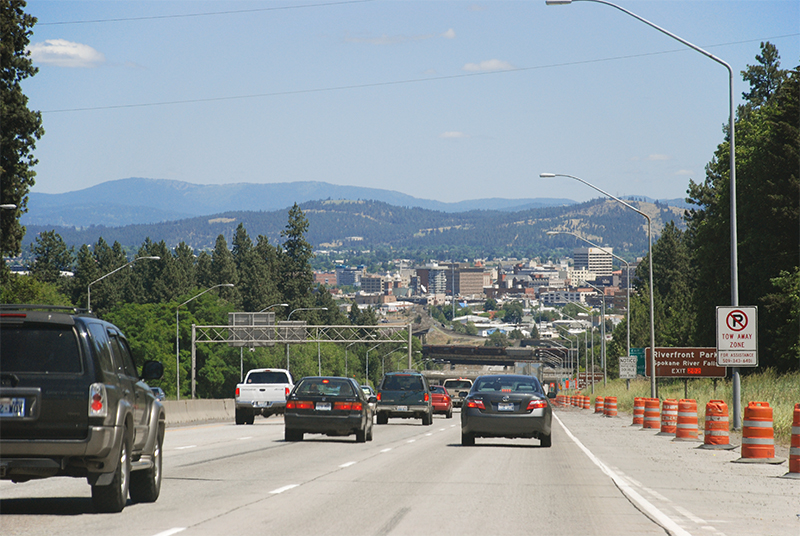
I-90, concurrent with US 2 and US 395, traveling east into Downtown Spokane

The byway travels off US 2 and onto SR 155 east of Coulee City at Fordair, continuing north through Grant County towards the Grand Coulee Dam. US 2 travels east into Lincoln County between the towns of Hartline and Almira and becomes concurrent with SR 21 in Wilbur for several city blocks. The highway parallels the Columbia River Subdivision of the BNSF Northern Transcon through Bachelor Prairie towards Davenport, where it intersects the termini of SR 28 and SR 25. US 2 travels into Reardan concurrent with SR 231 and enters Spokane County east of the town boundary. The highway passes Fairchild Air Force Base and becomes a four-lane arterial street through Airway Heights approaching Spokane. US 2 enters the city of Spokane as a four-lane freeway northeast of Spokane International Airport and intersects Airport Way before beginning its 3.82-mile-long (6.15 km) concurrency with I-90 and US 395 at a partial cloverleaf interchange.

I-90, US 2 and US 395 travel east into Downtown Spokane and intersects the northern terminus of US 195, which travels south towards Pullman and Lewiston, Idaho. US 2 and US 395 split from I-90 and travel into Downtown Spokane on the one-way pair of Browne and Division streets, serving the Spokane Intermodal Center and Spokane Convention Center before reaching Riverfront Park. Division Street crosses the Spokane River and the Centennial Trail on the Senator Sam C. Guess Memorial Bridge before splitting into the one-way pairing of Division and Ruby streets. Division Street continues north past the NorthTown Mall and the eastern terminus of SR 291 at Francis Avenue before US 2 and US 395 split.

US 2 travels northeast through Country Homes on the Newport Highway to an interchange with the North Spokane Corridor, an incomplete freeway bypass of Spokane that is signed as a spur route of US 395. The highway continues west of Mead and intersects SR 206, a road serving Mount Spokane State Park, before becoming a four-lane divided highway parallel the Kooteani River Subdivision of the BNSF Northern Transcon. US 2 travels north along the Little Spokane River through Colbert and Chattaroy before leaving Spokane County and entering Pend Oreille County. The divided highway ends at the southern terminus of SR 211, located west of Diamond Lake. US 2 continues northeast along the Little Spokane River and enters the city of Newport, splitting into a one-way pair on Washington and Union avenues. The two streets travel north through the city to the eastern terminus of SR 20 and turn east onto Walnut Street and the International Selkirk Loop, where US 2 crosses the Idaho state line at the northern terminus of SR 41 in Newport and ID-41 in Oldtown, Idaho.

== History ==
US 2 follows the route of several wagon roads and early state highways that themselves followed the route of the Skykomish River and the Great Northern Railway, a transcontinental railroad that was completed in 1893. A wagon road from Snohomish to Skykomish was completed in the late 1880s, while another wagon road along the Wenatchee River from Leavenworth to Sunnyslope was completed by 1904. The modern-day route of US 2 between Snohomish and Monroe was completed as a county wagon road in 1904. The state of Washington began maintaining State Road 7 in 1909, traveling from Peshastin to Spokane on what would become the Sunset Highway and US 2. The easternmost segment of US 2 within Washington, from Spokane to Newport, was added to the state highway system in 1915 as State Road 23 and renamed to the Pend Oreille Highway two years later. State Road 7 was renumbered to State Road 2, part of an east–west highway connecting Seattle to Spokane. The Stevens Pass Highway was opened on July 11, 1925, and traveled from Everett along the Skykomish River and over Stevens Pass towards Leavenworth. The Tumwater Canyon section northwest of Leavenworth opened to traffic on September 1, 1929, and later straightened in 1937. The highway was transferred to state maintenance from the Department of Highways in 1931 as State Road 15.

The United States Highway System was adopted by the American Association of State Highway Officials (AASHO) on November 11, 1926, and included a shorter US 2, traveling from Bonners Ferry, Idaho to the Upper Peninsula of Michigan, and several routes along the modern route of US 2 in Washington. The corridor of US 2 was signed as US 10 from Peshastin to Spokane and US 195 from Spokane to Newport, co-signed with State Road 2 and State Road 6, respectively. The Washington primary and secondary state highway system was adopted by the Washington State Legislature on March 17, 1937, and the three highways that comprise the present route of US 2 were included in the system as Primary State Highway 15 (PSH 15) from Everett to Peshastin, PSH 2 from Peshastin to Spokane, and PSH 6 from Spokane to the Idaho state line in Newport via a short branch route. US 10 was relocated to a southern route in 1939, crossing the Columbia River at Vantage, and the former route was replaced by US 10 Alternate the following year. A proposal from representatives of the highway departments of Idaho and Washington to extend US 2 to Everett was considered by the AASHO's U.S. Route Numbering Committee in January 1946, but was vetoed. The proposal resurfaced during the committee's meeting on December 20, 1946, and was approved as a replacement of US 10 Alternate from Everett to Bonners Ferry and US 195 from Spokane to Newport. The yet-unbuilt highway across Stevens Pass was also proposed in 1956 with a tunnel that would be funded as an addition to the new Interstate Highway System by Senator Warren G. Magnuson, but the amendment did not make it into the final bill.

The Washington state highway system was changed to its current "sign route system" beginning in January 1963 with a state highway renumbering. Under the new system, Interstate highways, U.S. routes, and state routes replaced the primary and secondary highways and were codified under the Revised Code of Washington in 1970. US 2 was re-routed around various cities over the next several decades onto limited-access highways to reduce congestion, beginning with the construction of the current westbound Hewitt Avenue Trestle east of Everett, which opened on April 8, 1969. The existing wooden trestle was used by eastbound traffic until it was replaced by a new bridge in 2002. US 2 was routed north of Wenatchee onto the Olds Station Bridge, renamed in 1991 to honor Richard Odabashian, over the Columbia River in 1975, while the former alignment was designated as SR 285 in 1977. The present two-lane expressway north and east of Snohomish was approved in 1969 and opened in October 1983; it was originally intended to also include an unfinished bypass of Monroe. US 97 had its concurrency with US 2 extended from Sunnyslope to Orondo along the east side of the Columbia River in 1987 after US 97 was moved onto the former route of SR 151. The Stevens Pass Greenway, which became a National Forest Scenic Byway on April 14, 1992, was re-designated as a National Scenic Byway on September 22, 2005. Within Newport, US 2 had an unsigned spur route that traveled on the southbound lanes of ID-41 on the Idaho state line until 1997, when SR 41 was created to avoid confusion. The intersection between US 2 and US 97 east of Peshastin was replaced by a new diamond interchange completed in October 2008 as part of general improvements to the two highways' concurrency from Peshastin to Sunnyslope. The current interchange between US 2 and the North Spokane Corridor, a spur route of US 395, was opened in November 2011 to coincide with the opening of the northernmost 5.5 miles (8.85 km) of the future freeway.

=== Everett–Skykomish corridor ===
In the early 2000s, WSDOT began planning a series of 56 projects to improve the US 2 corridor between Snohomish and Skykomish, where the highway is two lanes wide and has been the site of over 2,600 collisions between 1999 and 2007 that caused 47 fatalities. A study, conducted by WSDOT in 2007, divided the corridor into four segments, each with a specialized development plan. The study suggested the expansion of the limited-access highway from Snohomish to the western city limits of Monroe to four lanes, including an interchange at Bickford Avenue that was later completed in September 2013. A wider median with rumble strips was added to some sections of US 2 between Snohomish and Monroe in 2019.

WSDOT plans to move US 2 onto a northern bypass of Monroe, which would avoid the business district and intersect SR 522 with a roundabout. From Monroe to Gold Bar, US 2 would be expanded to a four-lane highway, with a roundabout connecting the highway to the city of Gold Bar, and become a two-lane highway with wider shoulder lanes to Skykomish. Seasonal traffic congestion in the Sultan area, which causes backups that overflow onto side streets, have inspired proposals to build an additional bypass, a two-street couplet, or a freeway along the Stevens Pass corridor. In 2023, the Sultan city government endorsed plans to widen US 2 to four lanes and replace several intersections with roundabouts.

In addition to the freeway expansion, WSDOT is considering a total replacement of the westbound Hewitt Avenue Trestle that would cost between $750 million to $1 billion. One of the options in the early feasibility study conducted in 2017 included a vehicle toll, which sparked public outcry on social media. The study also lists an increased gas tax, federal grants, and public-private partnerships as potential revenue sources for the project.

== Major intersections ==
| County | Location | mi | km | Destinations | Notes |
|---|---|---|---|---|---|
| Snohomish | Everett | 0.00 | 0.00 | SR 529 (Maple Street) / Hewitt Avenue – Everett City Center | National western terminus, continues as Hewitt Avenue and California Street |
| Snohomish | Everett | 0.14 | 0.23 | I-5 – Seattle, Vancouver BC | |
| Snohomish | Everett | West end of limited-access segment | | | |
| Snohomish | | 0.87 | 1.40 | Homeacres Road – Ebey Island | |
| Snohomish | Cavalero | 2.54 | 4.09 | SR 204 east / 20th Street SE – Lake Stevens | |
| Snohomish | Fobes Hill | 4.02 | 6.47 | Bickford Avenue – Snohomish | No westbound exit |
| Snohomish | | 5.17 | 8.32 | SR 9 – Arlington, Bothell | |
| Snohomish | | 8.64 | 13.90 | 88th Street Southeast – Snohomish | |
| Snohomish | East end of limited-access segment | | | | |
| Snohomish | Monroe | 14.35 | 23.09 | SR 522 west – Seattle | |
| Snohomish | Monroe | 15.00 | 24.14 | SR 203 south (Lewis Street) – Duvall, Fall City | |
| King | No major junctions | | | | |
| King–Chelan county line | | 64.77 | 104.24 | Stevens Pass | |
| Chelan | Coles Corner | 84.83 | 136.52 | SR 207 north – Plain | |
| Chelan | Leavenworth | 100.35 | 161.50 | Chumstick Highway | Former SR 209 |
| Chelan | Peshastin | 104.58 | 168.31 | US 97 south to I-90 / SR 970 – Cle Elum, Ellensburg, Seattle | Interchange, west end of US 97 overlap |
| Chelan | Sunnyslope | 118.97 | 191.46 | SR 285 south – Wenatchee | Interchange |
| Chelan | Sunnyslope | 119.73 | 192.69 | US 97 Alt. north (Euclid Avenue) – Entiat, Chelan | Interchange |
| Columbia River | | 119.97– 120.24 | 193.07– 193.51 | Richard Odabashian Bridge | |
| Douglas | East Wenatchee | 120.97 | 194.68 | SR 28 east to I-90 / Eastmont Avenue – East Wenatchee, Quincy, Pangborn Airport | |
| Douglas | Orondo | 132.89 | 213.87 | US 97 north – Chelan, Okanogan | East end of US 97 overlap |
| Douglas | Orondo | 133.31 | 214.54 | US 97 Spur west to US 97 north – Chelan, Okanogan | |
| Douglas | Farmer | 156.27 | 251.49 | SR 172 east – Mansfield | |
| Douglas | | 179.35 | 288.64 | SR 17 north – Bridgeport, Chief Joseph Dam | West end of SR 17 overlap |
| Grant | | 180.97 | 291.24 | SR 17 south – Soap Lake, Ephrata, Moses Lake | East end of SR 17 overlap |
| Grant | Fordair | 185.22 | 298.08 | SR 155 north – Grand Coulee Dam | |
| Lincoln | | 212.81 | 342.48 | SR 21 north to SR 174 west – Republic, Grand Coulee Dam | West end of SR 21 overlap |
| Lincoln | Wilbur | 213.46 | 343.53 | SR 21 south (West Street) – Lind, Odessa | East end of SR 21 overlap |
| Lincoln | Davenport | 242.68 | 390.56 | SR 28 west (12th Street) – Harrington, Ephrata | |
| Lincoln | Davenport | 243.47 | 391.83 | SR 25 north – Hunters, Kettle Falls | |
| Lincoln | | 253.01 | 407.18 | SR 231 south – Edwall, Sprague | West end of SR 231 overlap |
| Lincoln | Reardan | 255.89 | 411.82 | SR 231 north (Aspen Street) – Ford, Springdale | East end of SR 231 overlap |
West end of limited-access segment
| Spokane | | 273.97 | 440.91 | Sunset Highway - Spokane Airport | |
| Spokane | | 275.14 | 442.79 | I-90 west / US 395 south – Ritzville, Seattle | West end of I-90 / US 395 overlap |
| Spokane | | 275.14 | 442.79 | Garden Springs | Westbound exit only |
| Spokane | Spokane | 276.55 | 445.06 | US 195 south – Colfax, Pullman | |
| Spokane | Spokane | 277.20 | 446.11 | Maple Street / Walnut Street / Lincoln Street | |
| Spokane | Spokane | 278.73 | 448.57 | I-90 east / Division Street south – Coeur d'Alene | East end of I-90 overlap |
| Spokane | Spokane | East end of limited-access segment | | | |
| Spokane | Spokane | 283.08 | 455.57 | SR 291 north (Francis Avenue) | |
| Spokane | Spokane | 284.76 | 458.28 | US 395 north – Colville | East end of US 395 overlap; no access from US 395 south to US 2 east |
| Spokane | | 287.85 | 463.25 | US 395 Future south / to Francis Avenue | Interchange |
| Spokane | | 289.15 | 465.34 | SR 206 east – Mount Spokane State Park | |
| Pend Oreille | | 313.19 | 504.03 | SR 211 north – Cusick, Metaline Falls | |
| Pend Oreille | Newport | 325.79 | 524.31 | SR 20 west (Walnut Street) – Colville | |
| Washington–Idaho line | | 326.34 | 525.19 | State Avenue (SH-41 south) – Spirit Lake, Coeur d'Alene | Northern terminus of SH-41 |
| Washington–Idaho line | | 326.34 | 525.19 | US 2 east – Sandpoint | Continuation into Oldtown, Idaho |
1.000 mi = 1.609 km; 1.000 km = 0.621 mi: Concurrency terminus; Incomplete access

U.S. Route 2
| Previous state: Terminus | Washington | Next state: Idaho |
