= Ione, Washington =

Town in Pend Oreille County, Washington, United States

Ione
- Town
- Ione, Washington
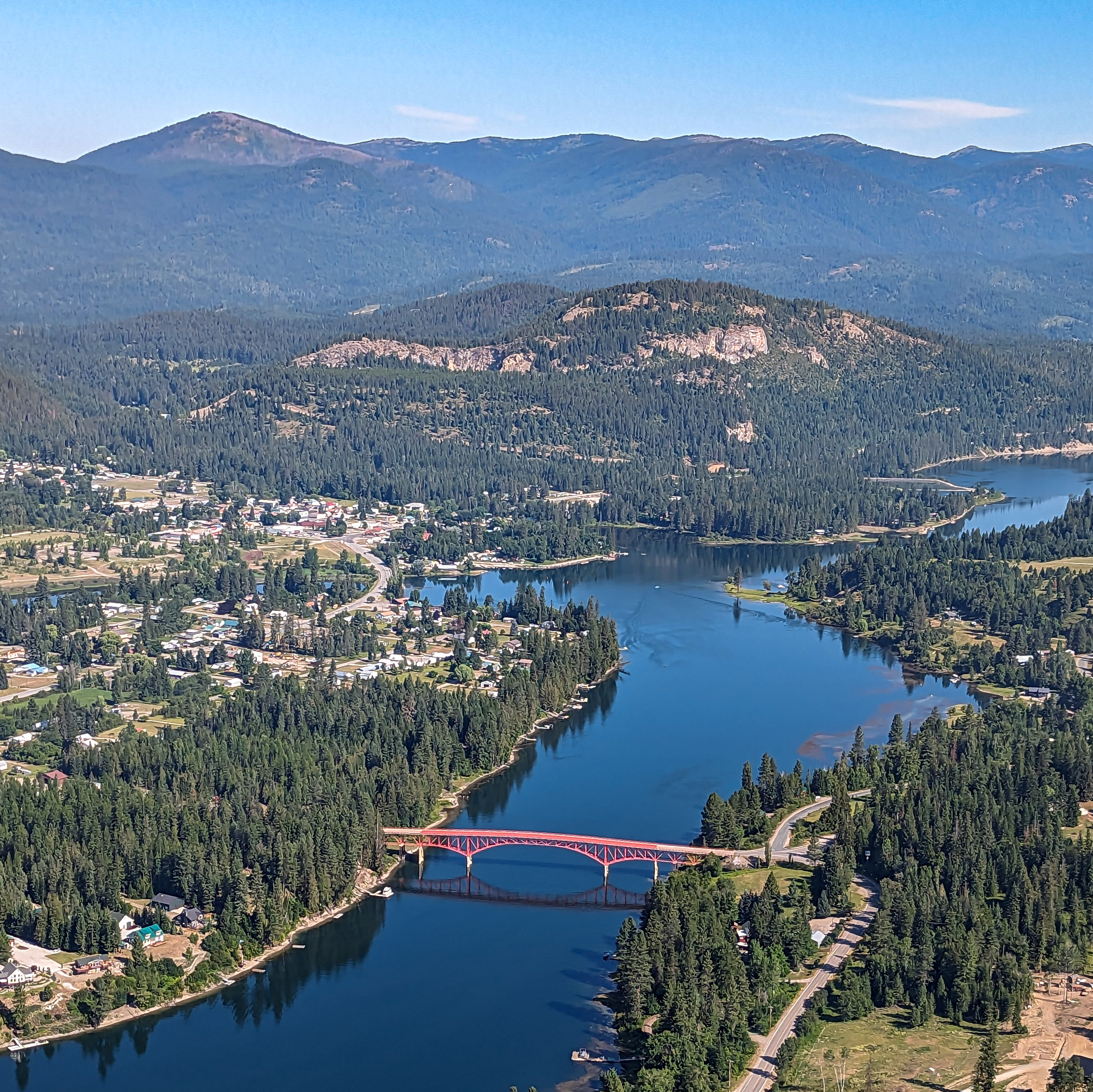
- Ione and Ione Bridge

- Location of Ione, Washington
- Coordinates: 48°44′24″N 117°25′18″W
- Country: United States
- State: Washington
- County: Pend Oreille

Government
  - Type: Mayor–council
  - Mayor: Michael Shipley

Area
  - Total: 0.62 sq mi (1.60 km^{2})
  - Land: 0.53 sq mi (1.38 km^{2})
  - Water: 0.085 sq mi (0.22 km^{2})
- Elevation: 2,097 ft (639 m)

Population (2020)
  - Total: 428
  - Density: 693/sq mi (267.5/km^{2})
- Time zone: UTC-8 (Pacific (PST))
  - Summer (DST): UTC-7 (PDT)
- ZIP code: 99139
- Area code: 509
- FIPS code: 53-33560
- GNIS feature ID: 2412795
- Website: www.ionewa.gov

Ione /aɪˈoʊn/ is a town in Pend Oreille County, Washington, United States. The population was 428 at the 2020 census.

== History ==
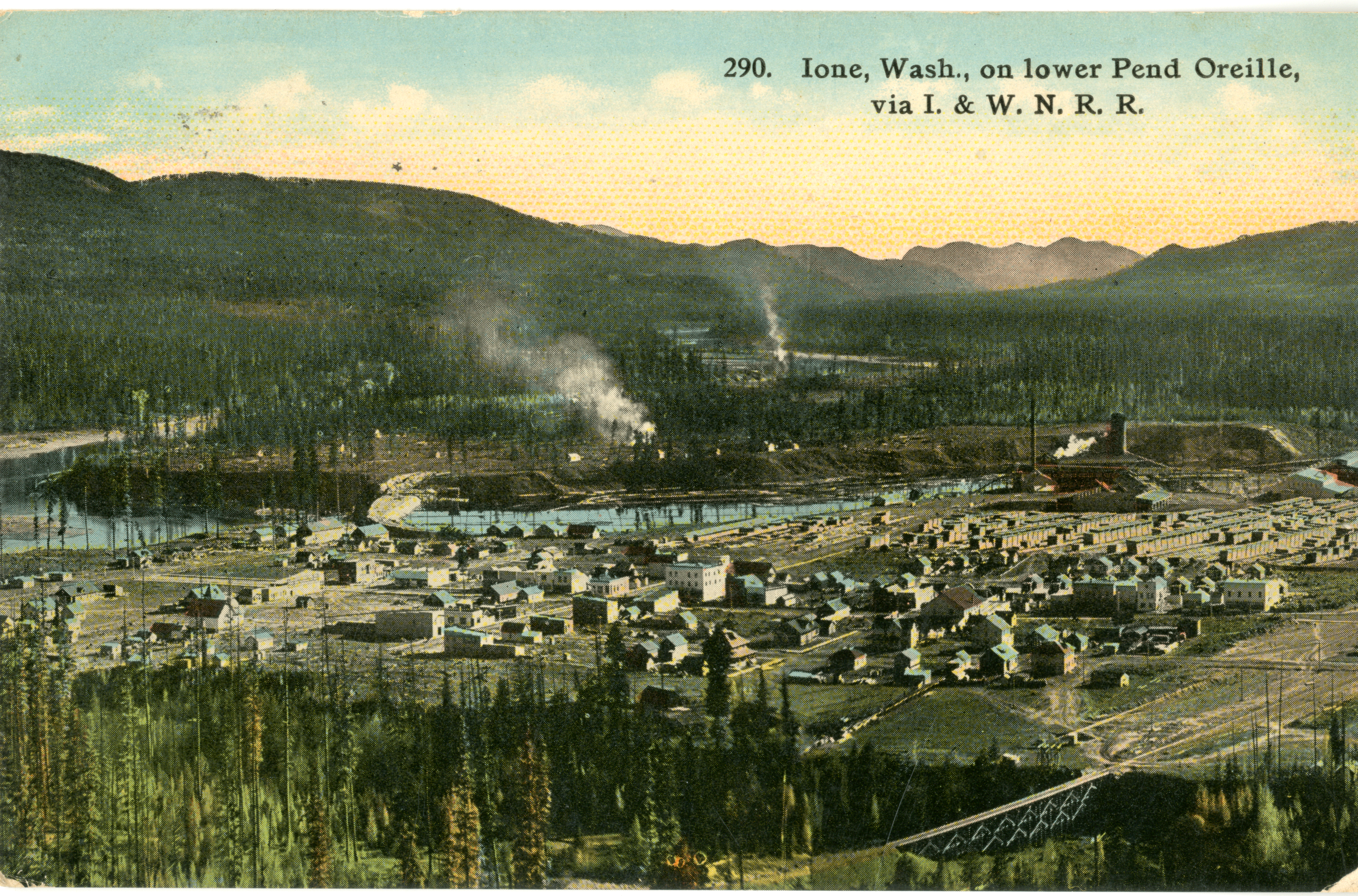
Ione in 1915

Ione was first settled in 1894 by homesteader Elmer Hall. Ione was officially incorporated on January 3, 1910.

The timber industry played a major role in Ione's history. In the early 1900's, Frederick A. Blackwell's Panhandle Lumber Company opened the inland northwest's first all-electric sawmill in Ione. The timber-based economy persisted for nearly 100 years in Ione, lasting until 1995 when the Vaagen Brothers' sawmill, the last major sawmill in the county, closed down. After the mill shut down, some of the residents relocated to Colville, due to the expansion of the local saw mill site.

The railroad reached Ione in 1910 when Blackwell built the Idaho and Washington Northern Railroad, connecting Ione with Metaline Falls in the north and Newport in the south.

When Pend Oreille County was established in 1911, Ione was one of four towns vying to land the county seat, along with Newport, Cusick, and Usk, with the honors being awarded to Newport in 1912.

== Geography ==
Ione is situated on the west bank of the Pend Oreille River as it flows north towards Canada. Big Muddy Creek, Little Muddy Creek and Cedar Creek, from south to north, join the river in Ione. State Route 31 passes through town. Ione Bridge, on the southern edge of town, is the only road crossing of the Pend Oreille between Metaline Falls to the north and Usk to the south. Being located in the Selkirk Mountains, the area immediately surrounding Ione is of high topographic relief. The town itself is on a relatively flat area along the river at an elevation of 2,090 feet above sea level, but the mountains rise dramatically both sides of the Pend Oreille. Cement Mountain, with its peak roughly a mile immediately north of town, rises to 3,003 feet. Molybdenite Mountain, across the river from Ione, rises even higher to 6,788 feet.

According to the United States Census Bureau, the town has a total area of 0.58 square miles (1.50 km^{2}), of which, 0.53 square miles (1.37 km^{2}) is land and 0.05 square miles (0.13 km^{2}) is water.

== Demographics ==
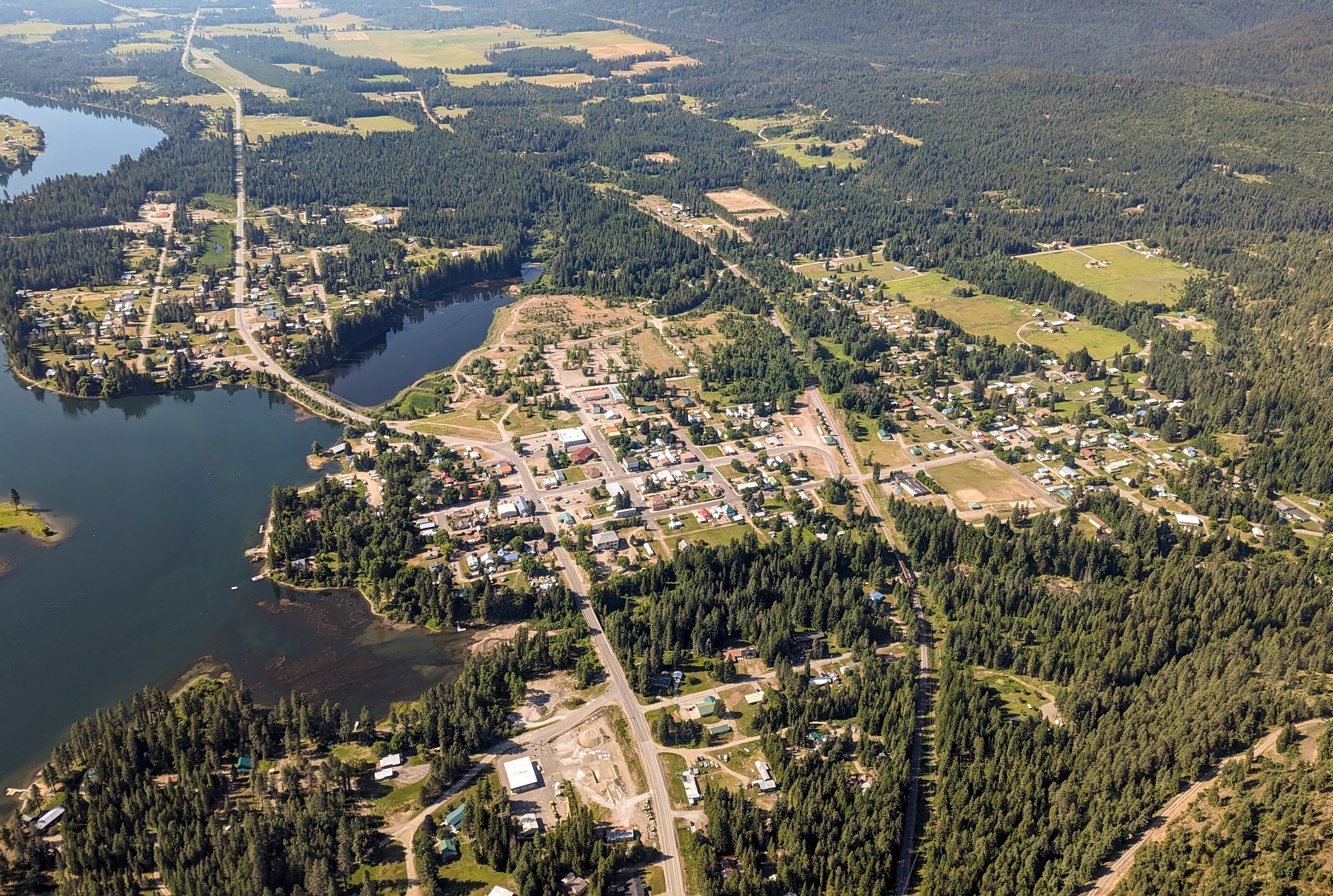
Town of Ione, Washington, looking south

Historical population
Census	Pop.	Note	%±
1910	634		—
1920	541		−14.7%
1930	594		9.8%
1940	681		14.6%
1950	714		4.8%
1960	648		−9.2%
1970	529		−18.4%
1980	594		12.3%
1990	507		−14.6%
2000	479		−5.5%
2010	447		−6.7%
2020	428		−4.3%

=== 2010 census ===
As of the 2010 census, there were 447 people, 195 households, and 112 families residing in the town. The population density was 843.4 inhabitants per square mile (325.6/km^{2}). There were 237 housing units at an average density of 447.2 per square mile (172.7/km^{2}). The racial makeup of the town was 98.0% White, 0.4% Native American, 0.2% Asian, 0.2% from other races, and 1.1% from two or more races. Hispanic or Latino of any race were 4.3% of the population.

There were 195 households, of which 29.2% had children under the age of 18 living with them, 42.6% were married couples living together, 9.7% had a female householder with no husband present, 5.1% had a male householder with no wife present, and 42.6% were non-families. 34.9% of all households were made up of individuals, and 14.8% had someone living alone who was 65 years of age or older. The average household size was 2.29 and the average family size was 2.92.

The median age in the town was 43.5 years. 23.7% of residents were under the age of 18; 7.1% were between the ages of 18 and 24; 22.1% were from 25 to 44; 28.9% were from 45 to 64; and 18.3% were 65 years of age or older. The gender makeup of the town was 49.9% male and 50.1% female.

=== 2000 census ===
As of the 2000 census, there were 479 people, 200 households, and 125 families residing in the town. The population density was 881.3 people per square mile (342.5/km^{2}). There were 239 housing units at an average density of 439.7 per square mile (170.9/km^{2}). The racial makeup of the town was 92.69% White, 0.21% African American, 2.09% Native American, 0.21% Asian, 0.21% from other races, and 4.59% from two or more races. Hispanic or Latino of any race were 1.46% of the population.

There were 200 households, out of which 30.5% had children under the age of 18 living with them, 48.5% were married couples living together, 7.5% had a female householder with no husband present, and 37.5% were non-families. 33.0% of all households were made up of individuals, and 17.0% had someone living alone who was 65 years of age or older. The average household size was 2.40 and the average family size was 3.08.

In the town, the population was spread out, with 28.6% under the age of 18, 5.8% from 18 to 24, 26.5% from 25 to 44, 23.2% from 45 to 64, and 15.9% who were 65 years of age or older. The median age was 38 years. For every 100 females, there were 90.8 males. For every 100 females age 18 and over, there were 90.0 males.

The median income for a household in the town was $24,083, and the median income for a family was $30,917. Males had a median income of $35,000 versus $17,500 for females. The per capita income for the town was $12,093. About 17.1% of families and 16.4% of the population were below the poverty line, including 15.1% of those under age 18 and 9.5% of those age 65 or over.

== Economy ==
Since Vaagen Brothers shut down in 1995, the majority of jobs are working for the hydroelectric dams in the area. Box Canyon Dam is operated by the Pend Oreille County Utilities District, and Boundary Dam is operated by Seattle City Light. There was an active Zinc mine running in nearby Metaline Falls until 2019, but Teck closed it permanently.

== Education ==
Ione, Metaline & Metaline Falls are covered by the Selkirk School District. Ione used to have its own elementary school, which was closed in 2005. It also used to have its own high school that was merged with the Selkirk Jr/Sr high around the mid 1950's.
