= Idaho and Washington Northern Railroad =

Idaho & Washington Northern Railroad
Overview
- Headquarters: Spirit Lake, ID
- Reporting mark: I&WN
- Locale: Eastern Washington and Northern Idaho
- Dates of operation: 1907–1916
- Successor: Milwaukee Road

Technical
- Track gauge: 1,435 mm (4 ft 8 1/2 in)
- Length: 104 miles

The Idaho & Washington Northern Railroad was a shortline railroad that operated between McGuire's, Idaho and Metaline Falls, WA. It was later purchased by the Milwaukee Road in 1914, after founder Frederick Blackwell relinquished control.

== History ==
The I&WN was created in 1907 by Frederick Blackwell, to reach timberland.

Construction started in early 1907, and the line from McGuire's to Newport was completed in late 1907. The line from Newport to Metaline Falls was completed in 1911.

The railroad was short-lived as it quickly began losing money due to the recession. In 1914, Blackwell relinquished control of the railroad to the Milwaukee Road as they agreed to take all debts owed by the I&WN.

The line became the Milwaukee Road's Metaline Falls Branch after it was acquired.

== Route ==
The Idaho and Washington Northern Railroad's southern end was in McGuire's, ID where it connected to other railroads. At the junction, it ran northward through the communities of Rathdrum, Spirit Lake, Coleman, Blanchard, Newport, Dalkenna, Usk, Ione and Metaline Falls.

Most of the I&WN line is still visible or in use. The McGuire-Newport segment was abandoned in 1976, and is privately owned by various people and entities. The Newport to Usk segment is currently owned and used by the Pend Oreille Valley Railroad, with the Usk-Metaline Falls segment was abandoned by the line in 2016 due to a lack of customers.

== Roster ==
The Idaho and Washington Northern Railroad had several steam locomotives.

Number	Builder	Class	Wheel Arrangement	Notes
I&WN 5 (MILW 26)	Lima Locomotive Works	Class C Shay		
I&WN 6	Lima Locomotive Works	Class C Shay		Never rostered or used by the Milwaukee Road.
I&WN 11 (MILW 2713)	Baldwin Locomotive Works		4-6-0	
I&WN 12 (MILW 2714)	Baldwin Locomotive Works		4-6-0	
I&WN 15 (MILW 2715)	Baldwin Locomotive Works		4-6-0	
I&WN 16 (MILW 2716)	Baldwin Locomotive Works		4-6-0	
I&WN 17 (MILW 2717)	Baldwin Locomotive Works		4-6-0	
I&WN 21 (MILW 7555)	Baldwin Locomotive Works		2-8-0	
I&WN 22 (MILW 7556)	Baldwin Locomotive Works		2-8-0	
I&WN 23 (MILW 7557)	Baldwin Locomotive Works		2-8-0	
I&WN 24 (MILW 7558)	Baldwin Locomotive Works		2-8-0	
I&WN 25 (MILW 7559)	Baldwin Locomotive Works		2-8-0	
I&WN 26 (MILW 1347)	Baldwin Locomotive Works		2-8-0	
I&WN 31			4-4-2	
