= Pend d'Oreilles =

Kalispel Pend d'Oreille
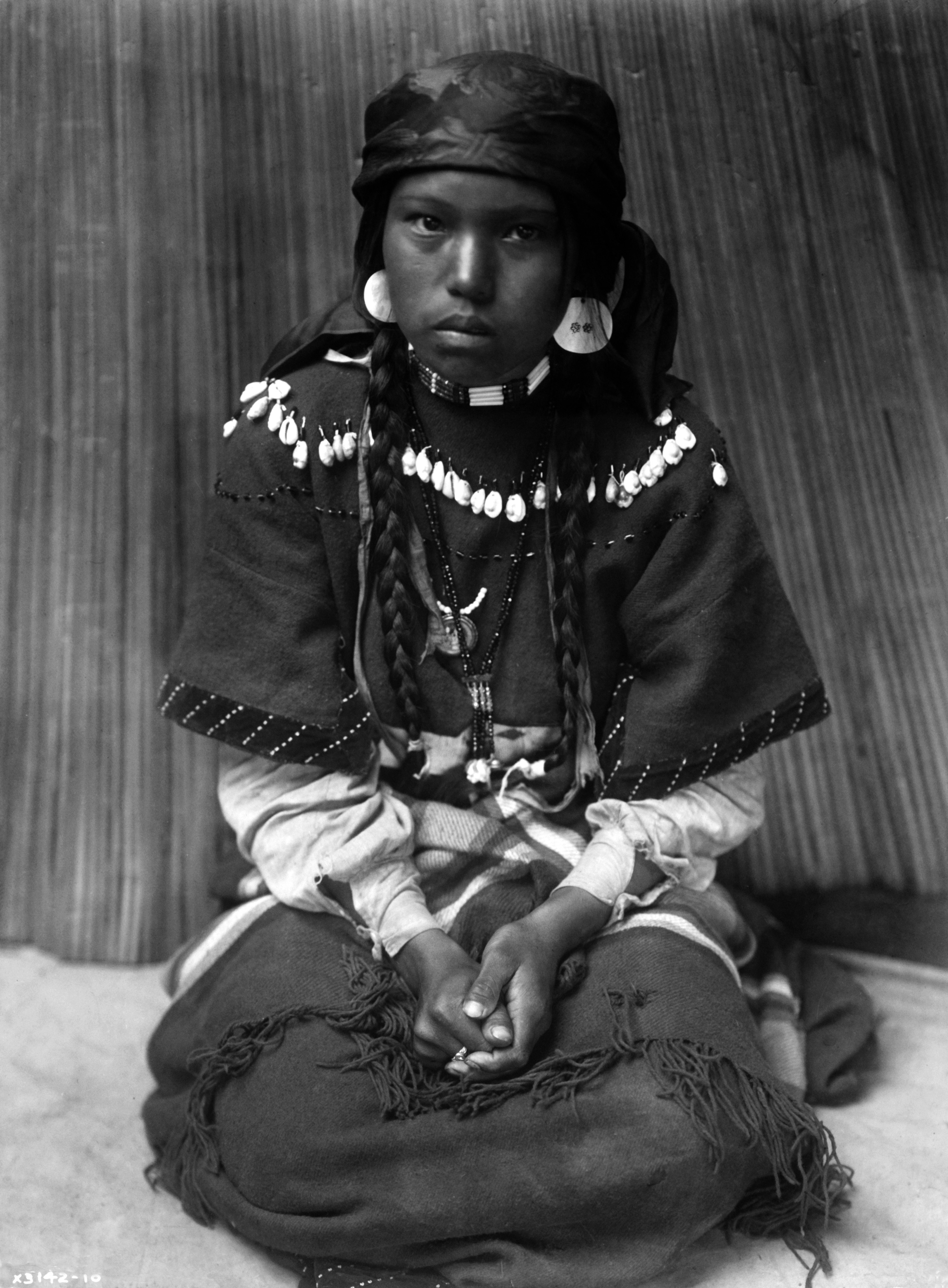
- Touch Her Dress, a Kalispel girl, ca. 1910

Total population
- over 400

Regions with significant populations
- United States (Montana, Washington)

Languages
- Kalispel-Pend d’Oreille, English

Religion
- traditional tribal religion

Related ethnic groups
- Chewelah, Spokane

The Pend d'Oreille or Pend d'Oreilles (/ˌpɒndəˈreɪ/ PON-də-RAY), also known as the Kalispel (/ˈkæləspɛl/), are Indigenous peoples of the Northwest Plateau. Today many of them live in Montana and eastern Washington of the United States. The Kalispel peoples referred to their primary tribal range as Kaniksu.

Their traditional territory comprised the drainage systems of the Flathead River, Clark Fork, and Pend Oreille rivers. It extended from roughly present-day Plains, Montana, westward along the Clark Fork River, to Lake Pend Oreille and Priest Lake in Idaho, and the Pend Oreille River (Ntxwe, meaning "river") in eastern Washington and into British Columbia (Canada).

They lived in many bands — originally, probably eleven — in their historic lands. They are generally divided geographically and culturally in two groupings:

- the "upstream people" or Upper Kalispel (or "Upper Pend d’Oreille") are commonly referred to as the Pend d'Oreille. They were also known as Kullyspelm or Ql̓ispé ("Camas People"). They are now enrolled in the federally recognized Confederated Salish and Kootenai Tribes of the Flathead Nation in Montana.

and

- the "downstream people" or Lower Kalispel (or "Lower Pend d’Oreille") are commonly referred to as the Kalispel. They were also known as Silkatkmlschi or Sɫq̓etkʷmsčin̓t ("People Living along the Shore of the Broad Water"), because they lived by Flathead Lake (Čɫq̓étkʷ - "Broad Water"). Today many are enrolled in the Kalispel Tribe of Indians in Washington. Some families are members of the Coeur d’Alene Tribe in Idaho.

In addition, some Kalispel are enrolled in the Confederated Tribes of the Colville Reservation in eastern Washington.

Prior to colonization by European-Americans, Chewelah was home to a band of the Lower Kalispel people. The band was known as the Slet̓éw̓si, meaning "valley people". The Chewelah Band of Indians is currently part of the Spokane Tribe of Indians of Washington.

== Name ==
The name Pend d’Oreille (French: [pɑ̃ d‿ɔ.ʁɛj]), which means "hangs from ear", was attributed to them by French-speaking colonists and traders in reference to the large shell earrings worn by these people. The name Kalispel is an anglicization of their name in their own language Ql̓ispé (Salishan: [qəˀlispe]), which means "Camas people". Camas is a flower bulb that was a staple of their diet.

== Language ==
Their language, Kalispel-Pend d’Oreille, is a Southern Interior Salish language. It is also known as Flathead-Kalispel.

== Reservations ==
The Pend d'Oreille people have two reservations: the Flathead Indian Reservation in western Montana and the Kalispel Indian Reservation in Washington. Also, a small number of Kalispel people live on the Colville Indian Reservation in Washington.

The main part of the Kalispel Reservation is northwest of Newport, Washington, in central Pend Oreille County. The main reservation is an 18.638 square kilometres (7.196 sq mi) strip of land along the Pend Oreille River, west of the Washington–Idaho border. There is also a small parcel of land in the western part of the Spokane metropolitan area in the city of Airway Heights, with a land area of 0.202 square kilometres (50 acres). This is the site of Northern Quest Resort & Casino, which is operated by the tribe. The total land area of the Kalispel Indian Reservation, located at 48°21′16″N 117°16′25″W in Pend Oreille County, is 18.840 square kilometres (7.274 sq mi). The nearest outside community is Cusick, near the south end of the reservation.

== History ==
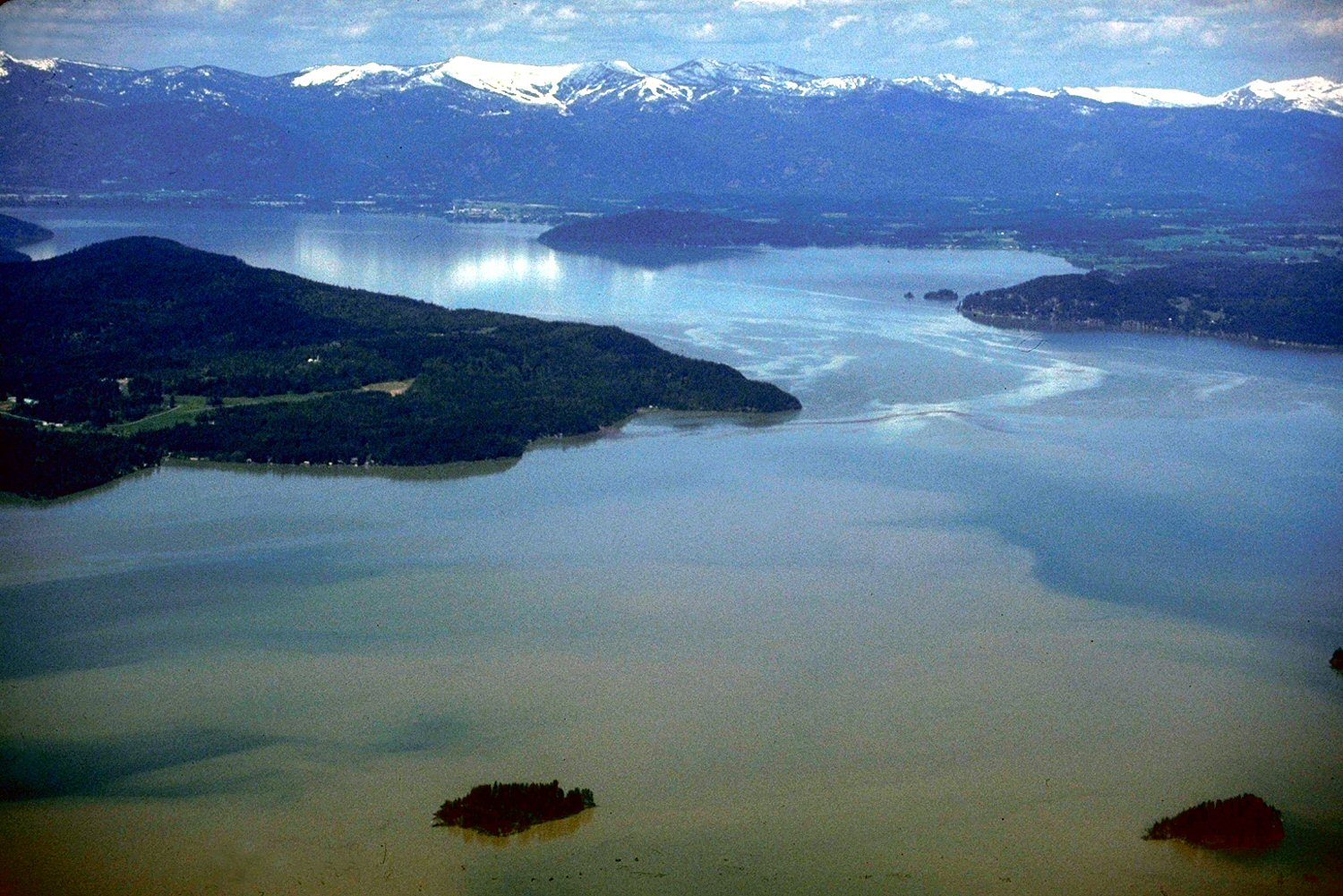
Lake Pend Oreille, part of the traditional Kalispel homeland

The Pend d'Oreille people are believed to have migrated south from British Columbia. In 1809, the North West Company established a trading post in their territory, calling it Kullyspell House. Jesuits established a Roman Catholic mission there in 1846. In 1855, the tribe split into the upper and lower divisions, with the upper moving to the Flathead Reservation in Montana. One of the two lower bands joined them in 1887.

These people made their weapons and tools from flint, and many other things were shaped with rocks. For housing, the Pend d’Oreille lived in tipis in the summer, as well as lodges in the winter time. These houses were all built out of large cattails, which were in abundance where the people lived. These cattails were woven into mats called “tule mats”, which were attached to a tree branch frame to form a hut. Today a large community building on the Kalispel reservation bears the name “Tule Hut” in reference to this traditional housing.

The tribe traded bison hides for horses and other useful goods. They traditionally made clothing from rabbit pelts and deer hides. They embellished hides with dyes, paints, beads, and porcupine quills.

The Upper Pend d’Oreille of the Flathead Reservation became engaged in a dispute over off-reservation hunting between the tribes and the state of Montana, resulting in the Swan Valley Massacre of 1908.

Long after they were dispossessed of their hereditary lands around Lake Pend Oreille, the Pend d'Oreille band of Kalispel continued to gather for an annual pow wow on its traditional grounds just east of what is now Sandpoint City Beach. The three-day event included ceremonies, dancing and traditional stick games. The pow wows in Sandpoint were discontinued in the early 1950s.

Since 1975, the Kalispel Tribe has held an annual pow wow at its Usk, Washington, reservation in July or August. The events are open to the public and include a dance contest, traditional foods, stick games and others.

== See also ==
- Kuilix
- Kullyspell House
