= Kalispel Indian Community of the Kalispel Reservation =

Ethnic group in the northwest United States

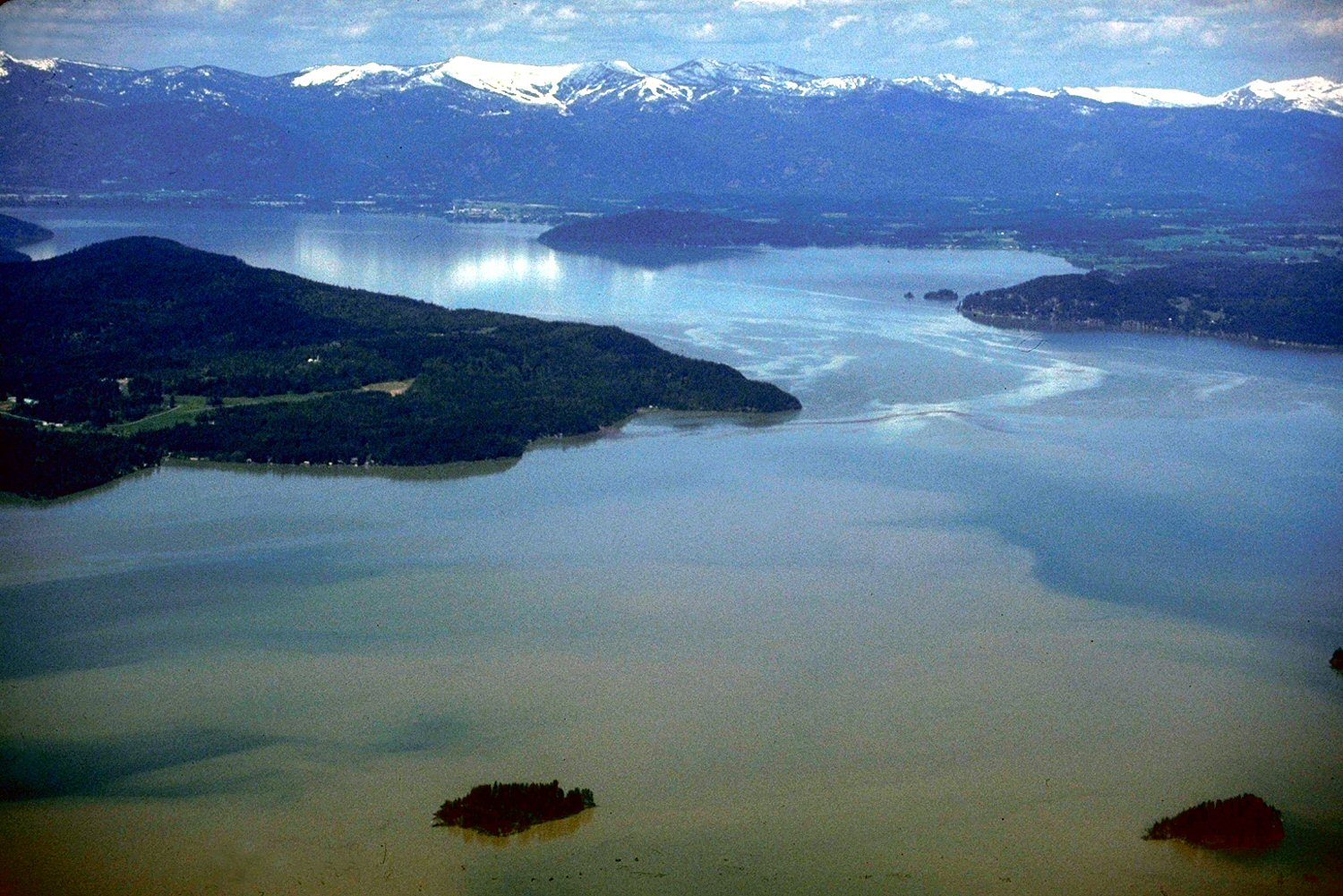
- Lake Pend Oreille, traditional Kalispel homeland

Total population
- over 400 enrolled members

Regions with significant populations
- United States (Washington)

Languages
- Kalispel language, English

Religion
- traditional tribal religion

Related ethnic groups
- other Kalispel/Pend d'Oreilles peoples, Chewelah people

Location of the Kalispel Reservation

The Kalispel Indian Community of the Kalispel Reservation is a federally recognized tribe of Lower Kalispel people, located in Washington. They are an Indigenous people of the Northwest Plateau.

== Reservation ==
The Kalispel Reservation, located in Usk in Pend Oreille County, Washington. It was founded in 1914 and is 4,557 acres (18.44 km^{2}) large.

== Government ==
The tribe's headquarters is in Cusick, Washington. The tribe is governed by a democratically elected, five-member tribal council. The general council, composed of enrolled members over the age of 18, vote in a general election the first Friday of June every year. Council members are elected for three-year terms. Members must cast their ballots in person, as there is no absentee voting allowed. The elected council members then vote for the officer positions. When voting on government and business matters the Chairman does not vote unless there is a tie. The current administration is as follows:

- Chairman: Glen Nenema
- Vice-Chairman: Curt Holmes
- Secretary: Betty Jo Piengkham
- Council Member: Nicholas Pierre
- Council Member: Sonny Bigsmoke

Chairman Glen Nenema has been Chairman for over four decades and is the longest consecutively elected tribal chairman in the United States.

== Language ==
Traditionally, Kalispel people spoke the Kalispel language, an Interior Salish language.

== History ==
Kalispel people are thought to have come from British Columbia. In the 18th century, the Niitsitapi people pushed them from the Great Plains to Pend d'Oreille River and Lake Pend Oreille. The town of Kalispell, Montana is named after the tribe.

In 1809, David Thompson opened a trading post for the North West Company of Montréal in their territory. A Roman Catholic mission was founded in the 1840s. The Upper Kalispel were forced onto an Indian reservation in Montana, while the Lower Kalispel remained on their homelands in Washington.

The tribe refused to sign a treaty proposed by the US government in 1872. In 1875, there were only 395 Lower Kalispel. Non-Natives claimed reservation lands under the Homestead Act, and economic opportunities for tribal members were minimal. In 1965, the average tribal member's income was $1,400, and there was only one telephone for the entire tribe.

== Economic development ==
The Tribe owns and operates the Northern Quest Resort & Casino, located in Airway Heights, Washington. The resort features Masselow's Steakhouse, EPIC Sports Bar, East Pan Asian Cuisine, Qdoba, Neon Pizza, Fatburger, Marketplace, Thomas Hammer Coffee, and Ben & Jerry's Ice Cream, as well as several bars and lounges: Legends of Fire, The Lounge at Masselow's, Liquid, and Highball. Other attractions include Turf Club Sports Book, La Rive Spa, Windfall, Kids Quest, and Cyber Quest.

The Tribe owns the franchise rights to the fast-casual chain Fatburger in Eastern Washington and western Montana and opened a restaurant in their casino in 2009.
