= Salish–Spokane–Kalispel language =

Salishan language of the United States

Salish
- nsélišcn (Flathead) npoqínišcn (Spokane)
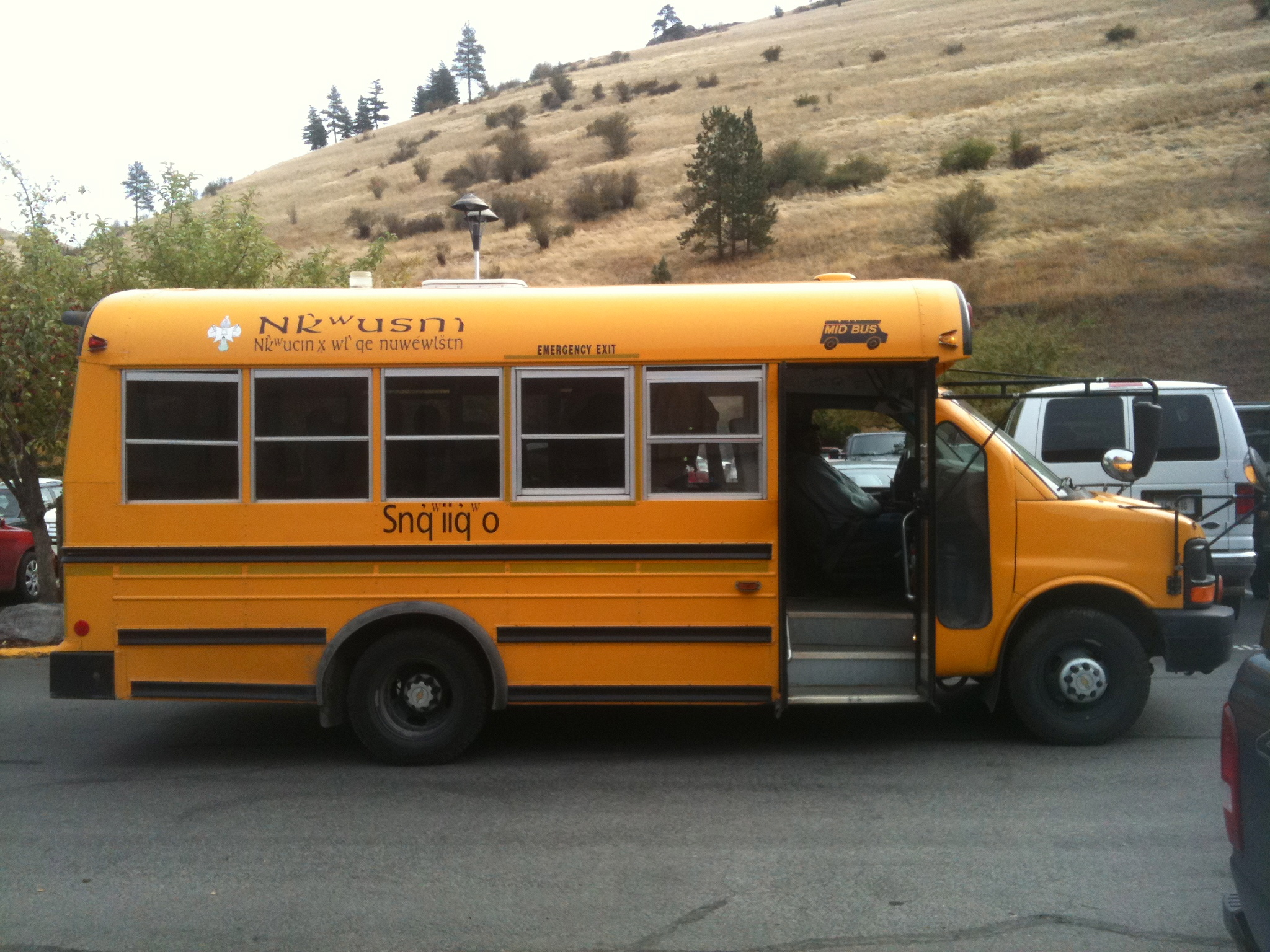
- Salish Language Revitalization Institute school bus in Missoula, 2011
- Native to: United States
- Region: Northwest region
- Ethnicity: 8,000 Pend d'Oreilles (Kalispel), Flathead, Spokane peoples (1977–1997)
- Native speakers: 70 (2009–2013)
- Language family: Salishan: Interior Salish; Southern; Salish

Language codes
- ISO 639-3: Either: fla – Flathead spo – Spokane
- Glottolog: kali1307
- ELP: Kalispel-Spokane-Pend d'Oreille-Salish
- Kalispel is classified as Critically Endangered by the UNESCO Atlas of the World's Languages in Danger.

The Salish language (/ˈseɪlɪʃ/ SAY-lish; endonym: nsélišcn) – also known by a number of other names (Note: Other names include: Kalispel; Kalispel–Pend d'Oreille; Kalispel–Spokane–Flathead; Spokane–Kalispel–Flathead; Salish–Spokane–Kalispel; Montana Salish.) to distinguish it from other Salishan languages – is a Salishan language spoken (as of 2005) by about 64 elders of the Flathead Nation in north central Montana and of the Kalispel Indian Reservation in northeastern Washington state, and by another 50 elders (as of 2000) of the Spokane Indian Reservation of Washington. As of 2012, Salish is "critically endangered" in Montana and Idaho according to UNESCO.

Dialects are spoken by the Spokane (Npoqínišcn), Kalispel (Qalispé), Pend d'Oreilles, and Bitterroot Salish (Séliš). The total ethnic population was 8,000 in 1977, but most have switched to English.

As is the case of many other languages of northern North America, Salish is polysynthetic; like other languages of the Mosan language area, it does not make a clear distinction between nouns and verbs. Salish is famous for native translations that treat all lexical Salish words as verbs or clauses in English—for instance, translating a two-word Salish clause that would appear to mean "I-killed a-deer" into English as I killed it. It was a deer.

== Language revitalization ==
Salish is taught at the Nkwusm Salish Immersion School, in Arlee, Montana. Public schools in Kalispell, Montana, offer language classes, a language nest, and intensive training for adults. An online Salish Language Tutor and online Kalispel Salish curriculum are available. A dictionary, Seliš nyoʔnuntn: Medicine for the Salish Language, was expanded from 186 to 816 pages in 2009; children's books and language CDs are also available.

Salish Kootenai College offers Salish language courses, and trains Salish language teachers at its Native American Language Teacher Training Institute as a part of its ongoing efforts to preserve the language. As of May 2013, the organization Yoyoot Skʷkʷimlt ("Strong Young People") is teaching language classes in high schools.

Salish-language Christmas carols are popular for children's holiday programs, which have been broadcast over the Salish Kootenai College television station, and Salish-language karaoke has become popular at the annual Celebrating Salish Conference, held in Spokane, Washington. As of 2013, many signs on U.S. Route 93 in the Flathead Indian Reservation were including the historic Salish and Kutenai names for towns, rivers, and streams, and the Missoula City Council was seeking input from the Salish-Pend d'Oreille Culture Committee regarding appropriate Salish-language signage for the city of Missoula.

== Phonology ==
=== Salish ===
==== Vowels ====
Salish has five vowels, /a e i o u/, plus an epenthetic schwa [ə] which occurs between an obstruent and a sonorant consonant, or between two unlike sonorants. Differences in glottalization do not cause epenthesis, and in long sequences not all pairs are separated, for example in /sqllˈu/ → [sqəllˈu] "tale", /ʔlˀlˈat͡s/ → [ʔəlˀlˈat͡s] "red raspberry", and /sˀnmˀnˈe/ → [səʔnəmˀnˈe] "toilet". No word may begin with a vowel.

==== Consonants ====
Salish has pharyngeal consonants, which are rare worldwide and uncommon but not unusual in the Mosan Sprachbund to which Salish belongs. It is also unusual in lacking a simple lateral approximant and simple velar consonants (/k/ only occurs in loanwords), though again this is known elsewhere in the Mosan area.

Montana Salish consonants
		Labial	Alveolar			Post- alveolar	Velar	Uvular/ Pharyngeal		Glottal
		Labial	plain	sib.	lat.	Post- alveolar	labial	plain	labial	Glottal
Plosive	tenuis	p	t	ts		tʃ	kʷ	q	qʷ	ʔ
Plosive	ejective	pʼ	tʼ	tsʼ	tɬʼ	tʃʼ	kʼʷ	qʼ	qʼʷ	ʔ
Fricative				s	ɬ	ʃ	xʷ	χ	χʷ	h
Sonorant	plain	m	n		l	j	w	ʕ	ʕʷ	
Sonorant	glottalic	ˀm	ˀn		ˀl	ˀj	ˀw	ˀʕ	ˀʕʷ	

Salish contrasts affricates with stop–fricative sequences. For example, [ʔiɬt͡ʃt͡ʃeˀn] "tender, sore" has a sequence of two affricates, whereas [stiʕít.ʃən] "killdeer" has a tee-esh sequence. All stop consonants are clearly released, even in clusters or word-finally. Though they are generally not aspirated, aspiration often occurs before obstruents and epenthetic schwas before sonorants. For example, the word /t͡ʃɬkʷkʷtˀnˈeˀws/ "a fat little belly" is pronounced [t͡ʃɬkꭩkꭩtʰəʔnˈeʔʍs]; likewise, /t͡ʃt͡ʃt͡sʼˈeˀlʃt͡ʃn/ "woodtick" is pronounced [t͡ʃt͡ʃt͡sʼˈeʔt͡ɬʃᵗʃən], and /ppˈiˀl/ is [pʰpˈiḭᵗɬə̥].

The lateral approximant /l/ and fricative /ɬ/ are typically prestopped. The fricative is therefore commonly realized as [ᵗɬ], and the approximant as [ᵈl]; the latter may also be fricated as [ᵗɬ] or [ᵈɮ], making it quite phonetically similar to the fricative in those contexts.

=== Spokane ===
==== Vowels ====
	Front	Central	Back
Close	i		u
Mid	e	(ə)*	o†
Open		a†	

* The epenthetic vowel is often realized as /ə/, but also /ɔ/ before rounded uvulars, and /ɪ/ before alveolars and palatals.

† Spokane vowels show five contrasts: /a/, /e/, /i/, /o/ and /u/, but almost all examples of /a/ and /o/ are lowered from /e/ and /u/, respectively, when those precede uvulars, or precede or follow pharyngeals.

Unstressed vowels are inserted to break up certain consonant clusters, with the vowel quality determined by the adjacent consonants.

==== Consonants ====
The consonant inventory of Spokane differs from Salish somewhat, including plain and glottalized central alveolar approximants /ɹ/ and /ˀɹ/, and a uvular series instead of post-velar.

		Labial	Alveolar			Post- alveolar	Labio- velar	Uvular/ Pharyngeal		Glottal
		Labial	plain	sib.	lat.	Post- alveolar	Labio- velar	plain	labial	Glottal
Plosive	tenuis	p	t	ts		tʃ	kʷ	q	qʷ	ʔ
Plosive	ejective	pʼ	tʼ	tsʼ	tɬʼ	tʃʼ	kʷʼ	qʼ	qʷʼ	ʔ
Fricative				s	ɬ	ʃ	xʷ	χ	χʷ	h
Sonorant	plain	m	n			j	w	ʕ	ʕʷ	
Sonorant	glottalic	ˀm	ˀn		ˀl	ˀj	ˀw	ˀʕ	ˀʕʷ	
Rhotic	plain		ɹ							
Rhotic	glottalic		ˀɹ							

==== Stress ====
Spokane words are polysynthetic, typically based on roots with CVC(C) structure, plus many affixes. There is one main stress in each word, though the location of stress is determined in a complex way (Black 1996).

== Morphology ==
Given its polysynthetic nature, Salish-Spokane-Kalispel encodes meaning in single morphemes rather than lexical items. In the Spokane dialect specifically, the morphemes ¬–nt and –el', denote transitivity and intransitivity, respectively. Meaning, they show whether or not a verb takes a direct object or it does not. For example, in (1) and (2), the single morphemes illustrate these properties rather than it being encoded in the verb as it is in English.

ɫox̩ʷ -nt -en
open(ed) -TR -1sg.SUBJ
'I made a hole in it'

puls -VC -st -el'
{die, kill} -OC -TR -SUCCESS
'He got to kill (one)'

Something that is unique to the Spokane dialect is the SUCCESS aspect morpheme: -nu. The SUCCESS marker allows the denotation that the act took more effort than it normally would otherwise. In (3) and (4) we can see this particular transformation.

ɫip' -nt -en
mark -TR -1sg.SUBJ
'I marked it'

ɫip' -nu -nt- en
mark -SUCCESS -TR -1sg.SUBJ
'I had a hard time marking it'

The SUCCESS aspect and an OUT-OF-CONTROL morpheme reduplication, found in other Native languages, are commonly found together in Spokane Salish. An OUT-OF-CONTROL reduplication morpheme denotes that the action was done by accident. Below, (5), (6) and (7) exemplify this.

ɫuʔ -nt -en
stab -TR -1sg.SUBJ
'I stabbed it/him/her.'

ɫuʔ -nu -nt -en
stab -SUCCESS -TR -1sg.SUBJ
'I managed to stab it/him/her.'

tuʔ -VC -nu -nt -en
stab -OC -SUCCESS -TR -1sg.SUBJ
'I managed to stab it/him/her by accident.'

The intransitive morpheme that describes extra effort is –el'. Barry Carlson states that:

"Spokane intransitive success forms, created with -el', emphasize that a subject's control requires extra effort in an event and they focus the duration of this effort well before the event beginning. This makes the predication a result. Thus, their true meaning can only be seen in a larger context."

That is to say, that for intransitive instances it is context driven and therefore extra context is needed in order to use the morpheme –el'. Example (8) derived from (1) illustrates this:

puls -VC -st -el'
{die, kill} -OC -TR -SUCCESS
'He got to kill (one)'

šíč'l' u ʔax̩í u pllstél'
{he missed} and finally and {he got to kill (one)}
'He kept missing, but finally he got to kill (one)'
