= List of lakes named Diamond =

There are a number of lakes named Diamond:

== United States ==
Name	GNIS Feature ID	State	County	Type	Coordinates (links to map & photo sources)	USGS 7.5' Map
Diamond Lake	1412903	AK	Kenai Peninsula	lake	61°01′04″N 150°22′24″W	Tyonek A-1 SW
Diamond Lake	1401180	AK	Matanuska-Susitna	lake	61°30′06″N 150°01′16″W	Tyonek C-1 SE
Diamond Lake	79643	AR	Izard	reservoir	36°12′30″N 091°43′24″W	Myron
Diamond Lake	222350	CA	Merced	reservoir	37°01′34″N 121°12′47″W	Pacheco Pass
Diamond Lake	259344	CA	Siskiyou	lake	41°24′43″N 123°13′07″W	English Peak
Diamond Lake	259343	CA	Tehama	lake	40°17′43″N 121°37′48″W	Lyonsville
Diamond Lake	222349	CA	Trinity	lake	40°56′38″N 122°54′13″W	Siligo Peak
Diamond Lake	181010	CO	Boulder	lake	39°59′35″N 105°38′59″W	East Portal
Diamond Lake	179885	CO	Lake	lake	39°19′03″N 106°20′38″W	Leadville North
Diamond Lake	179929	CO	Lake	reservoir	39°15′35″N 106°12′51″W	Climax
Diamond Lake	206682	CT	Hartford	lake	41°41′40″N 072°28′56″W	Marlborough
Diamond Lake	330735	GA	Gilmer	reservoir	34°40′03″N 084°17′09″W	Tickanetley
Diamond Lake	455907	IA	Dickinson	lake	43°28′53″N 095°11′28″W	Okoboji
Diamond Lake	455908	IA	Poweshiek	lake	41°35′15″N 092°33′27″W	Montezuma
Diamond Lake	380577	ID	Elmore	lake	43°55′37″N 115°09′16″W	Nahneke Mountain
Diamond Lake	380576	ID	Idaho	lake	46°05′38″N 114°32′19″W	Hunter Peak
Diamond Lake	407182	IL	Lake	lake	42°15′01″N 088°00′27″W	Grayslake
Diamond Lake	433531	IN	Kosciusko	lake	41°06′12″N 085°56′00″W	Silver Lake
Diamond Lake	433530	IN	Noble	lake	41°26′21″N 085°31′25″W	Ligonier
Diamond Lake	624634	MI	Cass	lake	41°54′09″N 085°58′50″W	Vandalia
Diamond Lake	624636	MI	Mecosta	lake	43°43′23″N 085°12′16″W	Mecosta NW
Diamond Lake	1619713	MI	Newaygo	lake	43°36′18″N 085°49′03″W	White Cloud
Diamond Lake	624637	MI	Osceola	lake	44°05′14″N 085°29′10″W	Le Roy
Diamond Lake	624635	MI	Shiawassee	lake	42°53′32″N 084°21′38″W	Laingsburg
Diamond Lake	642802	MN	Aitkin	lake	46°27′45″N 093°41′30″W	Spirit Lake
Diamond Lake	655988	MN	Cass	lake	46°59′54″N 094°27′03″W	Webb Lake
Diamond Lake	655987	MN	Cook	lake	48°09′30″N 090°55′58″W	Munker Island
Diamond Lake	642799	MN	Hennepin	lake	44°54′03″N 093°16′02″W	Minneapolis South
Diamond Lake	642804	MN	Hennepin	lake	45°12′09″N 093°30′11″W	Rogers
Diamond Lake	642803	MN	Hubbard	lake	47°22′10″N 095°04′00″W	Lake Hattie
Diamond Lake	642800	MN	Kandiyohi	lake	45°10′58″N 094°50′22″W	Atwater
Diamond Lake	1776001	MN	Kandiyohi	reservoir	45°11′12″N 094°49′30″W	Atwater
Diamond Lake	642798	MN	Le Sueur	lake	44°19′08″N 093°34′50″W	Kilkenny
Diamond Lake	642801	MN	Pope	lake	45°43′52″N 095°30′39″W	Lowry
Diamond Lake	805956	MT	Carbon	lake	45°02′00″N 109°46′51″W	Fossil Lake
Diamond Lake	782360	MT	Flathead	lake	47°37′59″N 113°09′11″W	Amphitheatre Mountain
Diamond Lake	782357	MT	Madison	lake	45°23′45″N 111°22′02″W	Beacon Point
Diamond Lake	782359	MT	Mineral	lake	47°08′50″N 115°10′33″W	Torino Peak
Diamond Lake	782358	MT	Park	lake	46°03′37″N 110°22′00″W	Crazy Peak
Diamond Lake	1844933	NE	Brown	lake	42°13′27″N 100°02′05″W	Koshopah NE
Diamond Lakes	1883153	NE	Gage	reservoir	40°02′27″N 096°51′52″W	Odell
Diamond Lake	828711	NE	Sheridan	lake	42°17′02″N 102°28′24″W	Twin Lakes
Diamond Lake	875909	NJ	Gloucester	reservoir	39°36′42″N 074°55′07″W	Buena
Diamond Lake	948414	NY	Hamilton	lake	43°18′25″N 074°43′46″W	Morehouse Lake
Diamond Lake	1140999	OR	Douglas	lake	43°09′32″N 122°08′59″W	Diamond Lake
Diamond Lake	1141000	OR	Union	lake	45°08′36″N 117°28′47″W	Steamboat Lake
Diamond Lake	1173222	PA	Huntingdon	lake	40°38′58″N 078°01′08″W	Franklinville
Diamond Lake	1254685	SD	Minnehaha	lake	43°50′32″N 097°06′00″W	Buffalo Trading Post
Diamond Lake	1440448	UT	Duchesne	lake	40°37′25″N 110°39′22″W	Tworoose Pass
Diamond Lake	1440449	UT	Summit	lake	40°41′07″N 110°56′34″W	Mirror Lake
Diamond Lake	1518752	WA	Kittitas	lake	47°26′33″N 121°09′42″W	Polallie Ridge
Diamond Lake	1518754	WA	Pend Oreille	lake	48°07′44″N 117°11′40″W	Diamond Lake
Diamond Lake	1518753	WA	Snohomish	lake	48°10′54″N 121°14′37″W	Lime Mountain
Diamond Lake	1518751	WA	Yakima	lake	46°27′40″N 121°16′28″W	Jennies Butte
Diamond Lake	1579126	WI	Bayfield	lake	46°15′44″N 091°08′36″W	Diamond Lake
Diamond Lake	1579127	WI	Oneida	lake	45°52′29″N 089°54′21″W	Lac du Flambeau SW
Diamond Lake	1563966	WI	Polk	lake	45°43′26″N 092°27′56″W	Frederic
Diamond Lake	1579125	WI	Taylor	lake	45°06′30″N 090°40′50″W	Lublin
Diamond Lake	1563967	WI	Vilas	lake	46°02′33″N 089°42′53″W	Boulder Junction
Diamond Lake	1587590	WY	Albany	lake	41°36′34″N 105°39′48″W	Bosler
Diamond Lake	1587591	WY	Johnson	lake	44°22′54″N 107°08′13″W	Cloud Peak
Diamond Lake	1599242	WY	Sublette	lake	42°43′17″N 109°14′17″W	Temple Peak

== See also ==
- List of lakes
- Lists of lakes
