= Metaline Falls, Washington =

Town in Pend Oreille County, Washington, United States

- Town
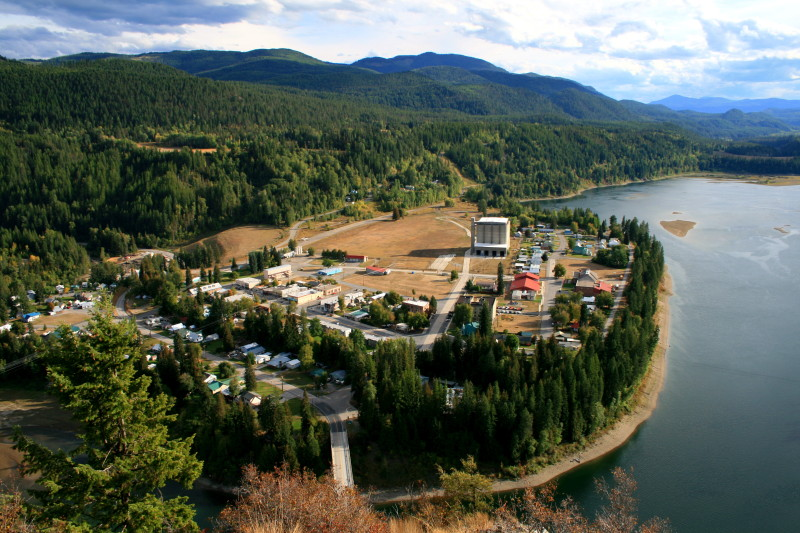
- Metaline Falls

- Location of Metaline Falls, Washington
- Coordinates: 48°51′38″N 117°22′25″W
- Country: United States
- State: Washington
- County: Pend Oreille
- Incorporated: May 13, 1911

Government
  - Type: Mayor–council
  - Mayor: Tara Leininger

Area
  - Total: 0.26 sq mi (0.68 km^{2})
  - Land: 0.20 sq mi (0.52 km^{2})
  - Water: 0.066 sq mi (0.17 km^{2})
- Elevation: 2,103 ft (641 m)

Population (2020)
  - Total: 272
  - Estimate (2023): 284
  - Density: 1,000/sq mi (400/km^{2})
- Time zone: UTC–8 (Pacific (PST))
  - Summer (DST): UTC–7 (PDT)
- ZIP Code: 99153
- Area code: 509
- FIPS code: 53-45320
- GNIS feature ID: 2412990
- Website: metalinefalls.gov

Metaline Falls is a town in Pend Oreille County, Washington, United States. The population was 272 at the 2020 census.

== History ==
By 1810, European fur traders were crossing the area. The settlement of Metaline Falls was founded in 1900, with most of its residents then employed by the Mammoth and Morning lead-zinc mines. Metaline Falls was officially incorporated on May 3, 1911.

The name Metaline comes from the abundance of lead ore, galena, found in the region. Though these lead deposits were known since 1869, mining did not commence until 1886. Then in 1910, Metaline Falls was connected with the Idaho and Washington Northern Railroad. The Lehigh Portland Cement Co. plant was soon built, taking advantage of the region's limestone deposits. The Pend Oreille Mine was developed in 1929 by Lewis P. Larsen, and combined with production from the Grandview Mine and the Metaline Mine, the area became the state's largest producer of lead and zinc.

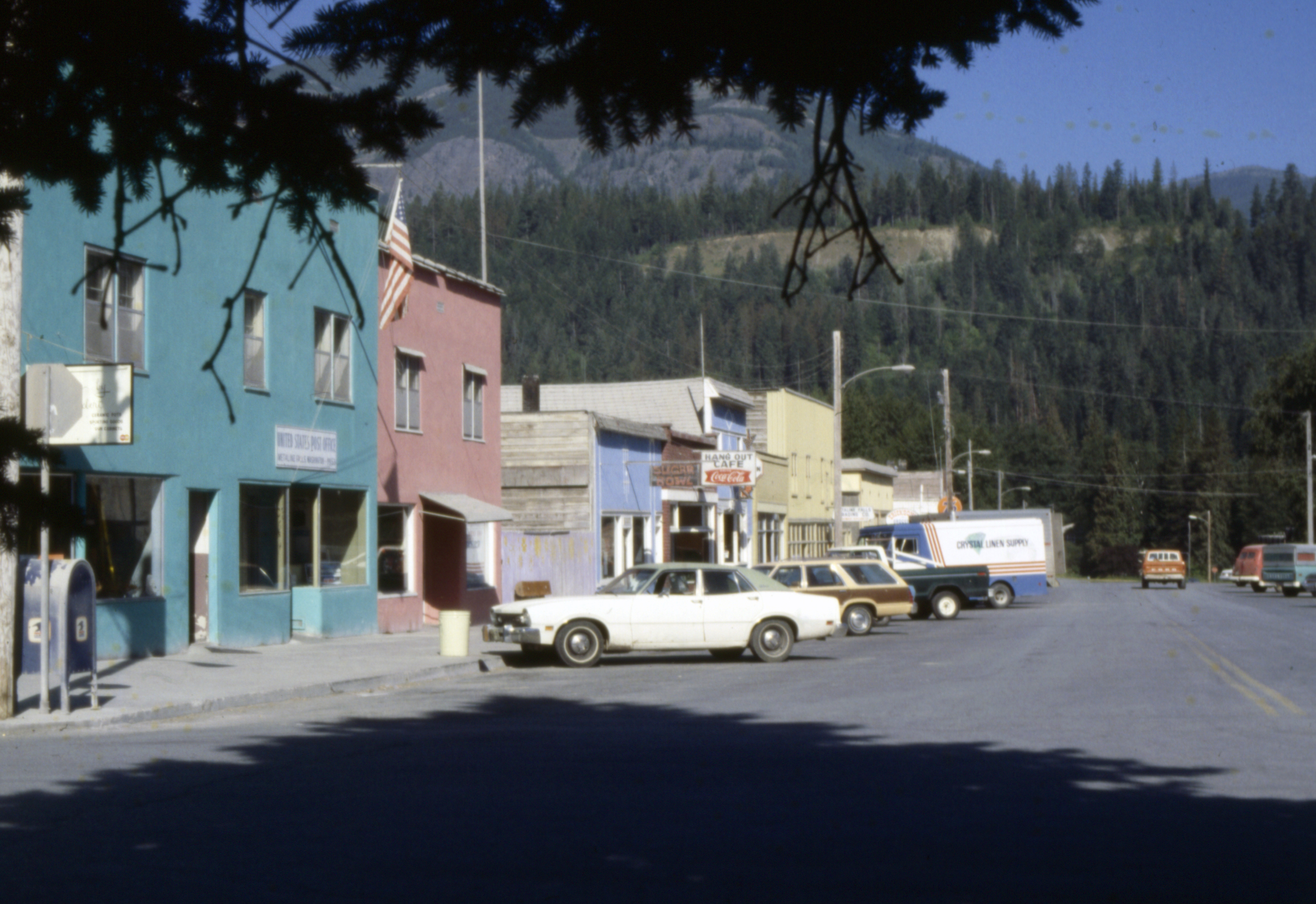
Metaline Falls, circa 1980

In 1942, Executive Order 9066 was issued, resulting in the forced internment of 120,000 Japanese-Americans. George Kubota, Sr., the patriarch of a Japanese-American family who ran a hardware store in town, was arrested and imprisoned by the FBI in Spokane. The editors of the Metaline Falls newspaper and the majority of residents in town protested the arrest, vouching for the Kubota family's loyalty. The FBI eventually released Kubota from custody and did not send the family to an internment camp.

== Geography ==
According to the United States Census Bureau, the town has a total area of 0.26 square miles (0.67 km^{2}), of which 0.20 square miles (0.52 km^{2}) is land and 0.06 square miles (0.16 km^{2}) is water.

Metaline Falls is located on the east bank of the Pend Oreille River as it flows north towards Canada. The town of [Metaline Falls, Washington] lies directly upstream from Metaline on the opposite bank of the river. The river makes a zig zag at Metaline Falls, turning briefly to the east to get around Washington Rock, which towers over Metaline Falls immediately to the north of the town and the Metaline Falls Bridge. Sullivan Creek, which drains nearby Sullivan Lake, enters the river at Metaline Falls. The river is the site of the lowest lying terrain in the Metaline Falls area, as it cuts its way through the peaks of the Selkirk Mountains which rise over 1,000 feet above the river within just a mile of the town.

The town is surrounded by the Colville National Forest, with the rugged and isolated Salmo-Priest Wilderness coming within just a few miles to the east. The Sullivan Lake Ranger District is headquartered in Metaline Falls.

State Route 31 passes through Metaline Falls, connecting the town to the rest of the state highway system at Tiger in the south and with Canada at Nelway, British Columbia.

=== Climate ===
Metaline Falls has a dry-summer Humid continental climate (Dsb) according to the Köppen climate classification system.

Climate data for Metaline Falls
Month	Jan	Feb	Mar	Apr	May	Jun	Jul	Aug	Sep	Oct	Nov	Dec	Year
Record high °F (°C)	49 (9)	57 (14)	71 (22)	87 (31)	98 (37)	98 (37)	104 (40)	108 (42)	96 (36)	87 (31)	59 (15)	55 (13)	108 (42)
Mean daily maximum °F (°C)	29.9 (−1.2)	37.3 (2.9)	46.9 (8.3)	58.9 (14.9)	68.5 (20.3)	74.4 (23.6)	83.9 (28.8)	82.3 (27.9)	72.8 (22.7)	57.2 (14.0)	39.6 (4.2)	32.4 (0.2)	57 (14)
Mean daily minimum °F (°C)	16.6 (−8.6)	19.5 (−6.9)	25.2 (−3.8)	31.5 (−0.3)	39 (4)	45 (7)	48.6 (9.2)	46.9 (8.3)	41.3 (5.2)	34.7 (1.5)	26.9 (−2.8)	21.7 (−5.7)	33.1 (0.6)
Record low °F (°C)	−29 (−34)	−28 (−33)	−9 (−23)	1 (−17)	22 (−6)	28 (−2)	31 (−1)	33 (1)	20 (−7)	−1 (−18)	−6 (−21)	−24 (−31)	−29 (−34)
Average precipitation inches (cm)	3 (7.6)	2.27 (5.8)	2.12 (5.4)	1.8 (4.6)	2.35 (6.0)	2.71 (6.9)	1.25 (3.2)	1.07 (2.7)	1.7 (4.3)	2.65 (6.7)	3.11 (7.9)	3.35 (8.5)	27.38 (69.5)
Average snowfall inches (cm)	26.3 (67)	15.7 (40)	8.5 (22)	0.7 (1.8)	0.1 (0.25)	0 (0)	0 (0)	0 (0)	0 (0)	1 (2.5)	9.8 (25)	23.1 (59)	85.2 (216)
Average precipitation days	14	12	12	10	11	12	6	6	7	11	13	15	129

== Demographics ==
Historical population
Census	Pop.	Note	%±
1920	153		—
1930	316		106.5%
1940	453		43.4%
1950	547		20.8%
1960	469		−14.3%
1970	307		−34.5%
1980	296		−3.6%
1990	210		−29.1%
2000	223		6.2%
2010	238		6.7%
2020	272		14.3%
2023 (est.)	284	▲	4.4%
U.S. Decennial Census; 2020 Census

=== 2010 census ===
As of the 2010 census, there were 238 people, 124 households, and 54 families residing in the town. The population density was 1,133.3 inhabitants per square mile (437.6/km^{2}). There were 206 housing units at an average density of 981.0 per square mile (378.8/km^{2}). The racial makeup of the town was 94.5% White, 0.4% African American, 2.1% Native American, 0.8% Asian, and 2.1% from two or more races. Hispanic or Latino of any race were 1.7% of the population.

There were 124 households, of which 24.2% had children under the age of 18 living with them, 36.3% were married couples living together, 4.0% had a female householder with no husband present, 3.2% had a male householder with no wife present, and 56.5% were non-families. 49.2% of all households were made up of individuals, and 18.5% had someone living alone who was 65 years of age or older. The average household size was 1.92 and the average family size was 2.91.

The median age in the town was 48.3 years. 20.6% of residents were under the age of 18; 4.6% were between the ages of 18 and 24; 18.9% were from 25 to 44; 37.8% were from 45 to 64; and 18.1% were 65 years of age or older. The gender makeup of the town was 47.9% male and 52.1% female.

=== 2000 census ===
As of the 2000 census, there were 223 people, 122 households, and 52 families residing in the town. The population density was 1,076.1 people per square mile (410.0/km^{2}). There were 192 housing units at an average density of 926.5 per square mile (353.0/km^{2}). The racial makeup of the town was 96.86% White, 1.35% Asian, 0.45% from other races, and 1.35% from two or more races. Hispanic or Latino of any race were 0.45% of the population.

There were 122 households, out of which 18.0% had children under the age of 18 living with them, 36.1% were married couples living together, 4.9% had a female householder with no husband present, and 56.6% were non-families. 54.1% of all households were made up of individuals, and 21.3% had someone living alone who was 65 years of age or older. The average household size was 1.83 and the average family size was 2.79.

In the town, the population was spread out, with 19.3% under the age of 18, 3.6% from 18 to 24, 21.1% from 25 to 44, 33.2% from 45 to 64, and 22.9% who were 65 years of age or older. The median age was 49 years. For every 100 females, there were 95.6 males. For every 100 females age 18 and over, there were 85.6 males.

The median income for a household in the town was $17,083, and the median income for a family was $35,250. Males had a median income of $36,250 versus $18,333 for females. The per capita income for the town was $16,390. About 24.4% of families and 33.2% of the population were below the poverty line, including 48.1% of those under the age of eighteen and 16.2% of those 65 or over.

== Arts and culture ==
=== Historical sites and buildings ===
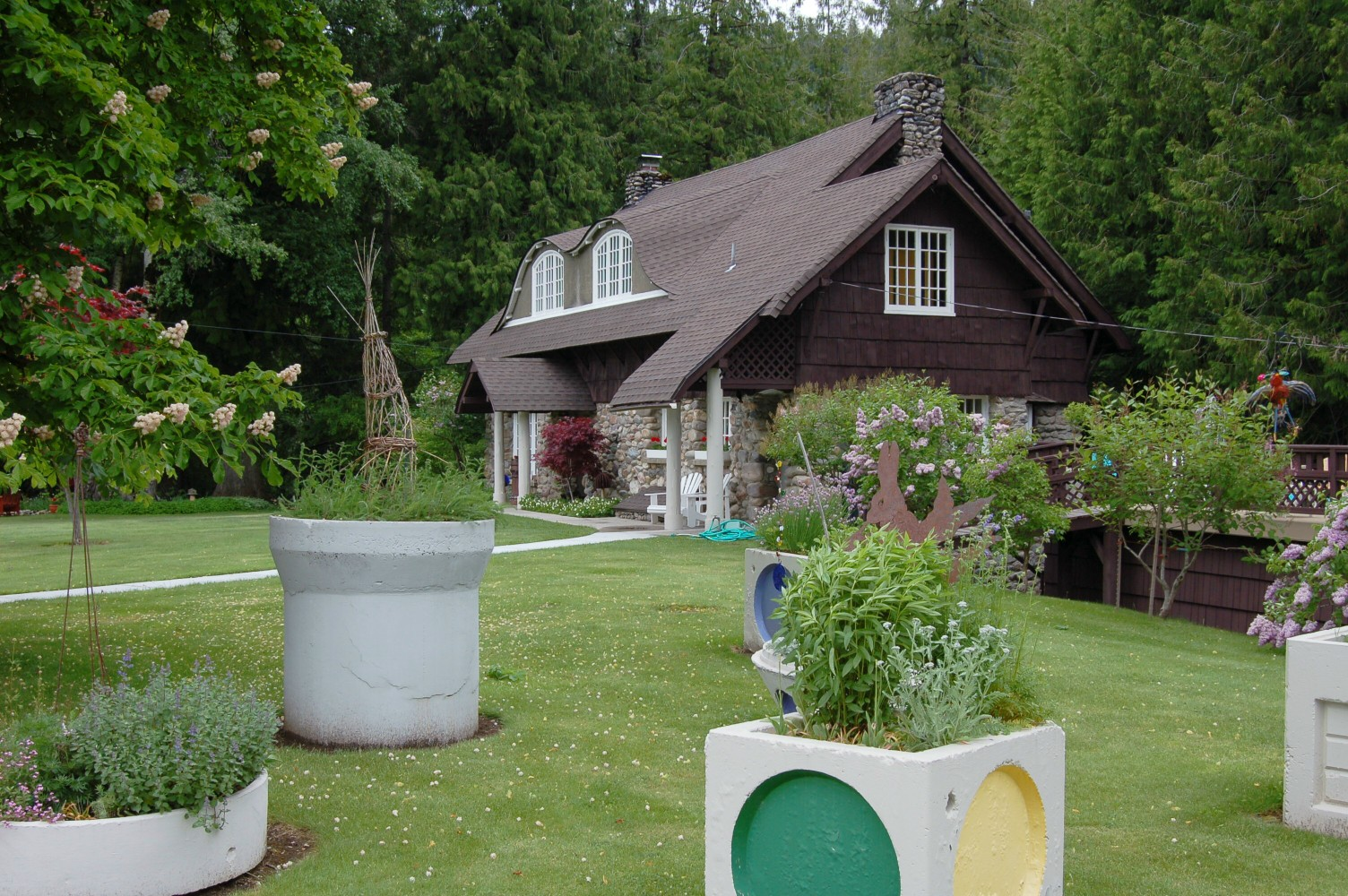
Lewis P. Larson House

Metaline Falls is home to four of Pend Oreille County's six locations on the National Register of Historic Places. The Lewis P. Larson House, built in 1910 and designed by Kirtland Cutter is an English cottage style home. The Pend Oreille Mines and Metals Building, now known as the Lewis Larson Apartments, is the last remaining structure in town that was part of Larson's mining empire. The Washington Hotel, built in 1910 by Larson. The Metaline Falls School, also designed by Cutter, was built in 1912 in the classical revival style. The school was abandoned in 1972 and sat unmaintained until 1990 when local residents came together to take care of the historic building, which is now known as the Cutter Theater and serves as a community center.

=== National protected areas ===
- Pacific Northwest National Scenic Trail (part)
- Colville National Forest
- Salmo-Priest Wilderness

== Education ==
Metaline Falls is located in the Selkirk School District, which serves the residents of northern Pend Oreille County. Metaline Falls was home to the Lillian Bailey Elementary School, which is closing in summer 2027 to make way for the new combined K-12 school being constructed at the current Jr/Sr high on State Route 31 near Ione.

== Media ==
- The train sequences of the 1993 film Benny & Joon were filmed in the Metaline Falls area
- The 1997 film The Postman was filmed in part in the area.
- The 1990 TV series Twin Peaks was based on Metaline Falls, 5 miles south of the Canadian border and 12 miles west of the Idaho-Washington State line.
