= Diamond Lake, Washington =

Lake and community in Washington, United States

- Unincorporated community
- Location within Washington (state)
- Coordinates: 48°07′19″N 117°11′57″W
- Country: United States
- State: Washington
- County: Pend Oreille
- Time zone: UTC-8 (Pacific (PST))
  - Summer (DST): UTC-7 (PDT)
- ZIP code: 99156
- Area code: 509

Diamond Lake is an unincorporated community in Pend Oreille County, Washington, United States located southwest of Newport, Washington. The Diamond Lake community is built around Diamond Lake.

== Lake ==
Diamond Lake
- Location within Washington (state) Location within the United States
- Coordinates: 48°07′45″N 117°11′39″W
- Basin countries: United States
- Surface area: 754.4 acres (305.3 ha)
- Average depth: 26 ft (7.9 m)
- Max. depth: 58 ft (18 m)
- Water volume: 24.787 acre⋅ft × 106 acre⋅ft (30,574 m^{3} × 130,749 m^{3})
- Shore length^{1}: 7 mi (11 km)
- Surface elevation: 2,343 ft (714 m)
- ^{1} Shore length is not a well-defined measure.

Diamond Lake is a 754.4-acre (3.053 km^{2}) natural lake located in the area north of U.S. Route 2.

The average depth of the lake is 26 ft (7.9 m) deep with a maximum depth of 58 ft (18 m). Diamond Lake offers year-round fishing and has a population of largemouth bass, yellow perch, bullheads, rainbow and brown trout. A cooperative net pen project releases 12,500 rainbow and brown trout. Approximately 200 rainbow trout surplus broodstock are farmed in Diamond Lake annually.
