= Metaline, Washington =

Town in Pend Oreille County, Washington, United States

- Town
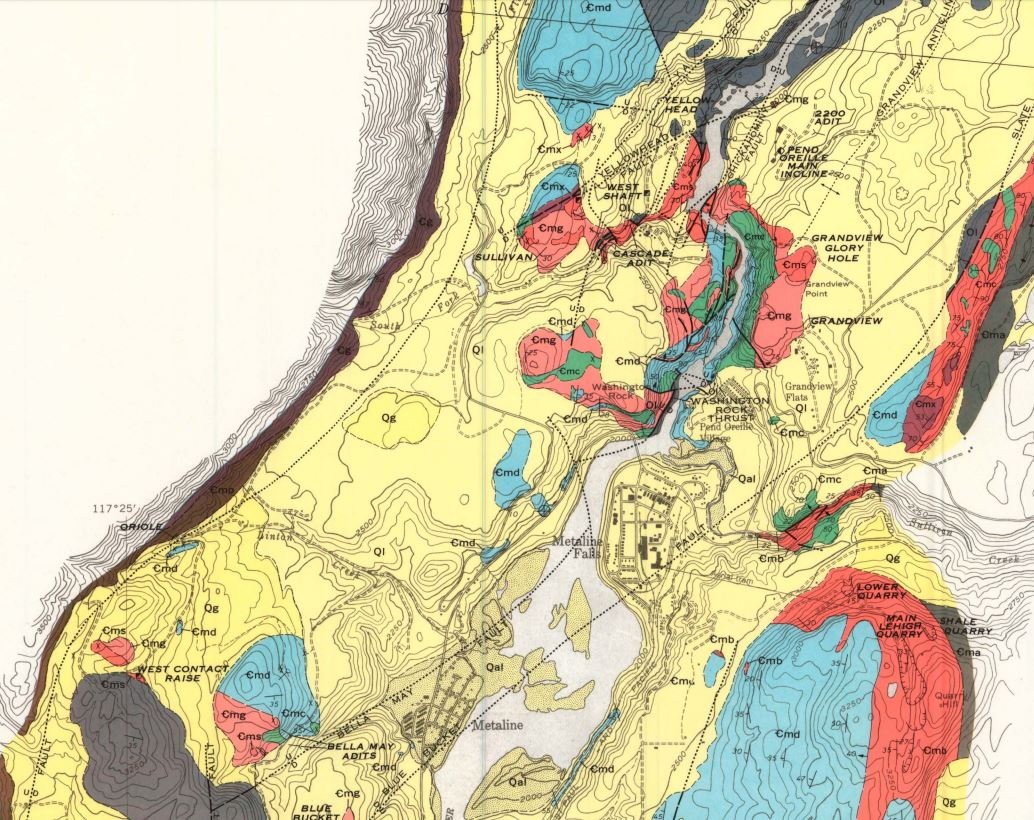
- Geological map of the Metaline area, and Metaline Mine location

- Location of Metaline, Washington
- Coordinates: 48°51′12″N 117°23′21″W
- Country: United States
- State: Washington
- County: Pend Oreille

Government
  - Type: Mayor–council
  - Mayor: Pete Daggett

Area
  - Total: 0.39 sq mi (1.01 km^{2})
  - Land: 0.31 sq mi (0.79 km^{2})
  - Water: 0.085 sq mi (0.22 km^{2})
- Elevation: 2,008 ft (612 m)

Population (2020)
  - Total: 162
  - Density: 530/sq mi (210/km^{2})
- Time zone: UTC-8 (Pacific (PST))
  - Summer (DST): UTC-7 (PDT)
- ZIP code: 99152
- Area code: 509
- FIPS code: 53-45285
- GNIS feature ID: 2412989

Metaline is a town in Pend Oreille County, Washington, United States. The population was 162 at the 2020 census.

== History ==
The Pend Oreille River was deepened at Box Canyon in 1906, allowing navigation to Metaline. The Metaline Mine then started producing lead from the Metaline Formation, a Middle Cambrian age limestone. By 1951, the mine had produced over 10,000 pounds of lead, and almost 37,000 pounds of zinc. In 1955, Metaline had a population of 400.

Metaline was officially incorporated on October 6, 1948.

== Geography ==
According to the United States Census Bureau, Metaline has a total area of 0.31 square miles (0.80 km^{2}), all of it land.

=== Climate ===
This climatic region is typified by large seasonal temperature differences, with warm to hot (and often humid) summers and cold (sometimes severely cold) winters. According to the Köppen Climate Classification system, Metaline has a humid continental climate, abbreviated "Dfb" on climate maps.

== Demographics ==
Historical population
Census	Pop.	Note	%±
1950	563		—
1960	299		−46.9%
1970	197		−34.1%
1980	190		−3.6%
1990	198		4.2%
2000	162		−18.2%
2010	173		6.8%
2020	162		−6.4%
U.S. Decennial Census; 2020 Census

=== 2010 census ===
As of the 2010 census, there were 173 people, 86 households, and 44 families residing in the town. The population density was 558.1 inhabitants per square mile (215.5/km^{2}). There were 103 housing units at an average density of 332.3 per square mile (128.3/km^{2}). The racial makeup of the town was 96.0% White, 2.3% Native American, and 1.7% from two or more races. Hispanic or Latino of any race were 2.3% of the population.

There were 86 households, of which 23.3% had children under the age of 18 living with them, 40.7% were married couples living together, 2.3% had a female householder with no husband present, 8.1% had a male householder with no wife present, and 48.8% were non-families. 44.2% of all households were made up of individuals, and 15.1% had someone living alone who was 65 years of age or older. The average household size was 2.01 and the average family size was 2.84.

The median age in the town was 50.2 years. 20.8% of residents were under the age of 18; 4.1% were between the ages of 18 and 24; 18.5% were from 25 to 44; 39.3% were from 45 to 64; and 17.3% were 65 years of age or older. The gender makeup of the town was 53.2% male and 46.8% female.

=== 2000 census ===
As of the 2000 census, there were 162 people, 73 households, and 44 families residing in the town. The population density was 533.5 people per square mile (208.5/km^{2}). There were 91 housing units at an average density of 299.7 per square mile (117.1/km^{2}). The racial makeup of the town was 91.98% White, 1.23% Native American, 0.62% Pacific Islander, and 6.17% from two or more races. Hispanic or Latino of any race were 1.23% of the population.

There were 73 households, out of which 26.0% had children under the age of 18 living with them, 45.2% were married couples living together, 11.0% had a female householder with no husband present, and 38.4% were non-families. 35.6% of all households were made up of individuals, and 16.4% had someone living alone who was 65 years of age or older. The average household size was 2.22 and the average family size was 2.82.

In the town, the population was spread out, with 25.9% under the age of 18, 4.3% from 18 to 24, 24.7% from 25 to 44, 30.2% from 45 to 64, and 14.8% who were 65 years of age or older. The median age was 42 years. For every 100 females, there were 110.4 males. For every 100 females age 18 and over, there were 118.2 males.

The median income for a household in the town was $22,981, and the median income for a family was $23,750. Males had a median income of $35,000 versus $11,563 for females. The per capita income for the town was $11,262. About 25.0% of families and 32.6% of the population were below the poverty line, including 48.1% of those under the age of eighteen and none of those 65 or over.
