= Cusick, Washington =

Town in Pend Oreille County, Washington, United States

Cusick čmq̓ʷoqnú
- Town
- Cusick, Washington
- Location of Cusick, Washington
- Coordinates: 48°20′00″N 117°17′40″W.
- Country: United States
- State: Washington
- County: Pend Oreille

Government
  - Mayor: Tina Alford

Area
  - Total: 0.75 sq mi (1.93 km^{2})
  - Land: 0.51 sq mi (1.32 km^{2})
  - Water: 0.24 sq mi (0.61 km^{2})
- Elevation: 2,051 ft (625 m)

Population (2020)
  - Total: 153
  - Density: 300/sq mi (116/km^{2})
- Time zone: UTC-8 (PST)
  - Summer (DST): UTC-7 (PDT)
- ZIP code: 99119
- Area code: 509
- FIPS code: 53-16340
- GNIS feature ID: 2412397

Cusick (Salish: čmq̓ʷoqnú) is a town in Pend Oreille County, Washington, United States. The population was 153 at the 2020 census. Cusick is the headquarters of the federally recognized Kalispel Indian Community of the Kalispel Reservation.

== History ==
Cusick occupies the former site of the largest village of the Pend d'Oreilles tribe, where as many as 1,000 people once lived.

Cusick was founded in 1902 by Joseph W. Cusick. Cusick was officially incorporated on March 15, 1927. One of the last town marshals was Kevin Derrick, who was the marshal in the late 1970s.

== Geography ==
According to the United States Census Bureau, the Cusick has a total area of 0.45 square miles (1.17 km^{2}), all of it land.

== Demographics ==
Historical population
Census	Pop.	Note	%±
1930	380		—
1940	404		6.3%
1950	360		−10.9%
1960	299		−16.9%
1970	257		−14.0%
1980	246		−4.3%
1990	195		−20.7%
2000	212		8.7%
2010	207		−2.4%
2020	153		−26.1%
U.S. Decennial Census; 2020 Census

=== 2010 census ===
As of the 2010 census, there were 207 people, 86 households, and 56 families residing in the town. The population density was 460.0 inhabitants per square mile (177.6/km^{2}). There were 101 housing units at an average density of 224.4 per square mile (86.6/km^{2}). The racial makeup of the town was 73.4% White, 2.4% African American, 19.8% Native American, 1.4% from other races, and 2.9% from two or more races. Hispanic or Latino of any race were 3.4% of the population.

There were 86 households, of which 32.6% had children under the age of 18 living with them, 34.9% were married couples living together, 22.1% had a female householder with no husband present, 8.1% had a male householder with no wife present, and 34.9% were non-families. 30.2% of all households were made up of individuals, and 8.1% had someone living alone who was 65 years of age or older. The average household size was 2.41 and the average family size was 2.96.

The median age in the town was 42.8 years. 24.6% of residents were under the age of 18; 9.3% were between the ages of 18 and 24; 19.8% were from 25 to 44; 33.3% were from 45 to 64; and 13% were 65 years of age or older. The gender makeup of the town was 57.5% male and 42.5% female.

=== 2000 census ===
As of the 2000 census, there were 212 people, 87 households, and 60 families residing in the town. The population density was 624.9 people per square mile (240.7/km^{2}). There were 106 housing units at an average density of 312.4 per square mile (120.4/km^{2}). The racial makeup of the town was 95.28% White, 3.77% Native American, and 0.94% from two or more races. Hispanic or Latino of any race were 0.47% of the population.

There were 87 households, out of which 36.8% had children under the age of 18 living with them, 42.5% were married couples living together, 21.8% had a female householder with no husband present, and 29.9% were non-families. 27.6% of all households were made up of individuals, and 12.6% had someone living alone who was 65 years of age or older. The average household size was 2.44 and the average family size was 2.90.

In the town, the population was spread out, with 29.7% under the age of 18, 5.7% from 18 to 24, 26.4% from 25 to 44, 25.9% from 45 to 64, and 12.3% who were 65 years of age or older. The median age was 37 years. For every 100 females, there were 92.7 males. For every 100 females age 18 and over, there were 86.3 males.

The median income for a household in the town was $14,583, and the median income for a family was $14,000. Males had a median income of $30,625 versus $21,250 for females. The per capita income for the town was $11,371. About 36.2% of families and 41.2% of the population were below the poverty line, including 61.7% of those under the age of eighteen and 6.1% of those 65 or over.
