= Usk, Washington =

Unincorporated community in Pend Oreille County, Washington, United States

- Unincorporated community
- Location within Washington (state)
- Coordinates: 48°18′50″N 117°16′47″W
- Country: United States
- State: Washington
- County: Pend Oreille
- Named: 1890
- Elevation: 2,054 ft (626 m)
- Time zone: UTC-8 (Pacific (PST))
  - Summer (DST): UTC-7 (PDT)
- ZIP code: 99180
- Area code: 509
- GNIS feature ID: 1527654

Usk is an unincorporated community in Pend Oreille County, Washington, United States. Usk is located along the Pend Oreille River 2 miles (3.2 km) southeast of Cusick. Usk has a post office with ZIP code 99180. It is near the Kalispel Indian Reservation. There is also a general store.

Usk was named for the River Usk in Wales around 1890.
