= J. J. Donovan =

Washington State pioneer

John Joseph Donovan
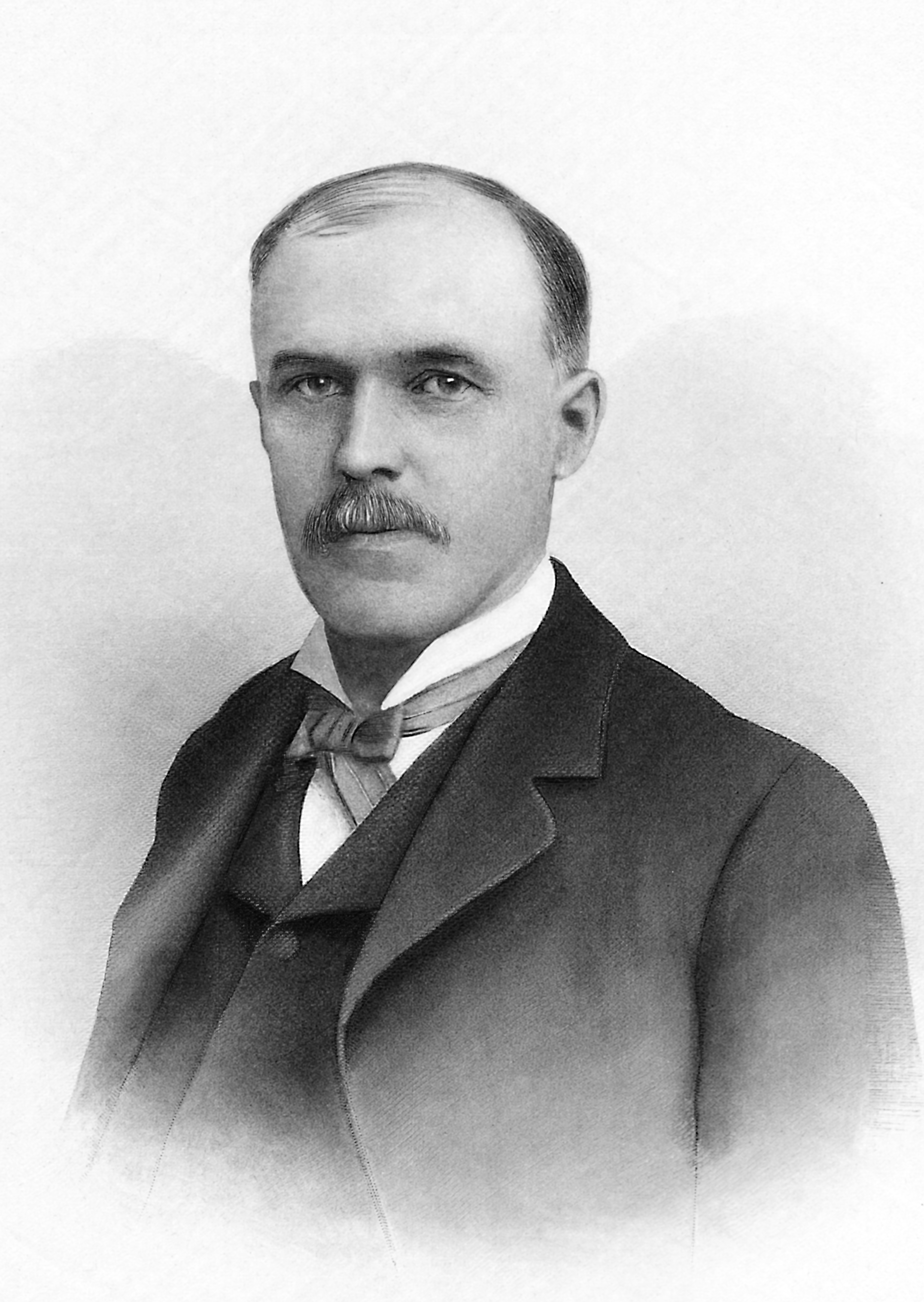
- Born: September 8, 1858; Rumney, New Hampshire, US
- Died: January 9, 1937 (aged 78); Bellingham, Washington, US
- Monuments: Donovan House in Bellingham, Washington; Bronze statue in Fairhaven, Washington
- Education: Worcester Polytechnic Institute
- Occupations: Councilman; president of the Washington State Chamber of commerce; president of the Bellingham Chamber of commerce; co-founder and vice president of the Bloedel Donovan Lumber Mills; vice president of the First National Bank of Bellingham
- Years active: 1888 – c. 1935
- Organizations: American Society of Civil Engineers; Navy League of the United States; Knights of Columbus; American Historical Association; Rainier Club, and other
- Known for: A Washington State pioneer and one of the key founders and developers of Bellingham, Washington who played a key role in the merger of Fairhaven and Whatcom, Washington. He was an active citizen, businessman, and political figure on city, county, and state levels. He established, developed, and directed lumber mills, coal mines, and small railroads.
- Political party: Republican
- Spouse: Clara Isabel Nichols (married 1888 – 1936)
- Children: 3

John Joseph Donovan (September 8, 1858 – January 9, 1937) was a Washington State pioneer and the president of the state Chamber of Commerce, as well as one of the key founders of the City Council of Bellingham, Washington. During his life, Donovan actively participated in political, industrial, and commercial activity on city, county, and state levels. Several historic landmarks exist in Bellingham honoring J. J. Donovan, including his house, which was added to the National Historic Register, and a bronze statue installed in Fairhaven, Washington.

One of Donovan's influential achievements as councilman was the merger of Fairhaven and Whatcom, the two towns that formed the city of Bellingham. He played a key role in organizing the city's sewage system and building its first hospital, and served as the vice president of the First National Bank of Bellingham. He designed and built the first ocean dock on the bay and developed the first hydraulic power plant in Whatcom County.

On the state level, he actively lobbied the building of trunk highways. As an industrial businessman, Donovan founded, developed, or directed a number of companies, including railroads, lumber mills, and coal mines. Under his supervision as the general superintendent and chief engineer of the Bellingham Bay & British Columbia Railroad, the railroad line to Spokane was extended. Later, Donovan also connected Bellingham with Canada by railroad. He contributed to the lumber and coal mining businesses of the state by establishing the Blue Canyon Coal Mining Company and co-founding the Bloedel Donovan Lumber Mills company, which operated a number of sawmills and shingle mills across the state and employed 600 men.

In politics, Donovan was a strong Republican and actively opposed KKK activities in the state of Washington.

== Early life and family ==
John Donovan was born in Rumney, New Hampshire, on September 8, 1858. His parents were Patrick Donovan and Julia O'Sullivan, who both came to America from Ireland at a young age. They married and settled in New Hampshire, where Patrick Donovan worked for the Boston, Concord & Montreal Railroad as a foreman. Patrick bought a farm in Plymouth, New Hampshire, and moved there. John Donovan was the eldest of seven siblings, including Daniel P., who worked at the Northwestern Life Insurance Company in Boston; Dennis, who died in infancy; Katherine (Kate) E., a Plymouth resident; Mary Agnes, married to George Lynch from Lancaster, New Hampshire; Margaret, married to A. N. Gilbert from Berlin, New Hampshire; and Julia Teresa, married to Hon. F. F. Blake from Plymouth, New Hampshire.

== Education and first jobs ==
Donovan's childhood was spent on the family farm in Plymouth. He received his elementary education in public schools. In 1877, he graduated from the New Hampshire State Normal School; he also studied at the Tilton Academy.

His first job was teaching in New Hampshire and Massachusetts public schools. However, he decided to change his profession by getting a degree in civil engineering from the Polytechnic School at Worcester, Massachusetts. He began in 1879 or 1880, and graduated in 1882. Of the 31 students of his class, Donovan was chosen to be valedictorian, and was one of two students offered a job at the Northern Pacific Railway.

== Career ==
=== Engineering for the Northern Pacific Railway (1882–1888) ===
In July 1882, Donovan travelled west and started working for Northern Pacific Railway construction works in Montana. He began as a rodman, working with leveling rods in a surveying crew. In a month, he was promoted to leveler, and six months later was the assistant engineer of construction. September 8, 1883, Donovan's 25th birthday, was also a notable date for the Northern Pacific Railroad: the main line from east and west were connected near Gold Creek, Montana. Donovan travelled nearly all night to be present at the event. Among the guests were President Ulysses S. Grant, William M. Evarts, several Crow Indian chiefs, prominent engineers and railway officials, businessmen, American soldiers, cattlemen, and newspaper reporters.

Afterwards, Donovan kept working on a number of truss bridges, and two months later transferred to Washington state to work on the Cascade division of the Northern Pacific, and on building the Cascade Tunnel under the supervision of famous railroad magnate Nelson Bennett. Donovan worked as an engineer of track and bridges, locating engineer, engineer-in-charge on the west Cascade division, and the engineer on the Cascade Tunnel. While surveying, he crossed the mountains through 20 feet (6.1 m) of snow almost daily. On June 1, 1887, the Northern Pacific switchback across the mountains was completed. After this milestone, Donovan took his first vacation. He travelled to Alaska and visited his hometown in New England.

In September 1887, following his vacation, Donovan returned to work and was put in charge of the new lines being built by the Northern Pacific Railroad to connect the main railroad to the Montana mining camps. After the construction was completed in the spring of 1888, Donovan resigned that position. Later that year, he got married, and brought his wife to his home in Tacoma, Washington.

=== Life and career in Bellingham Bay, Washington (1888 – c. 1935) ===
In 1888, Donovan quit the Northern Pacific Railway, accepting an offer to occupy the position of chief engineer in several enterprises located around Bellingham Bay, Washington. With his wife, he moved to Fairhaven, which was barely a village then, with no stores or paved streets and population of about 50. He built his family home there and started to develop the town, engineering for companies that built a railroad and wharves. He zoned the territory and established a coal mine on the Skagit River. He also worked on establishing other necessary enterprises.

By 1890, Fairhaven had every function of a city, and Donovan served on the first and second city councils. He became a member of the Bellingham Bay Improvement Company, established in 1890, which was aimed at the development of several industries in town, including coal mining, railroad building, lumbering, and others. Under Donovan's supervision as chairman of the sewerage committee, the sanitary expert of Chicago, Benezette Williams, was invited to plan the city's sewer system. In other achievements, Donovan designed and built the city's first ocean dock. He occupied positions of chief engineer for the Fairhaven Land Company, Skagit Coal & Transportation Company, and Fairhaven & Southern Railroad.

==== Participation in railroad business ====
In 1890, Donovan worked as chief engineer at the Fairhaven & Southern Railroad, which started plotting the line from Vancouver, British Columbia, to Portland, Oregon, and to Spokane, Washington. When the construction of 80 miles (130 km) of track was completed, the road was bought by the Great Northern Railway, and Donovan quit.

In 1891, the Bellingham Bay & Eastern Railroad Company was formed by Montana capital. Donovan worked there as an engineer during the time of its expansion from Fairhaven to Whatcom and to Wickersham, where it connected with the Northern Pacific Railway.

In 1898, as general superintendent and chief engineer of the Bellingham Bay & British Columbia Railroad, Donovan expanded the line to Spokane. Under his management, by 1903 the railroad had 40 miles (64 km) of track in operation, 15 miles (24 km) under construction, and roughly 300 miles (480 km) under survey. Donovan actively lobbied to connect Bellingham with Canada. After his first attempt failed, Seattle was chosen over Bellingham to be the terminal stop.

==== Lumbering and mining businesses ====
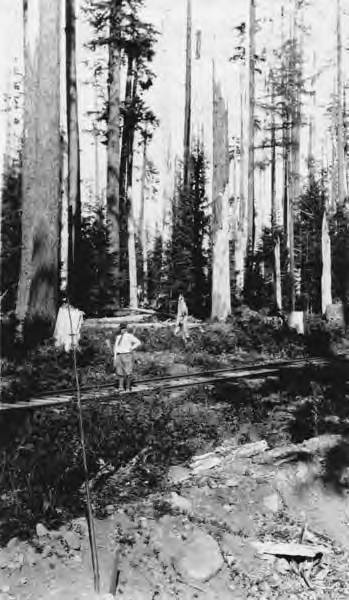
Donovan standing on rail tracks, Bloedel-Donovan lumber operation, August 27, 1924

In 1891, Donovan started working as an engineer for land appraisers and participated in the establishment of the Blue Canyon Coal Mining Company. He built its bunkers on the lake and bay and served as its vice president.

In 1898, partnering with Julius Bloedel and Peter Larson, Donovan established the Lake Whatcom Logging Company. At different times, he served as vice president and president there. In 1900, the partners founded the Larson Lumber Company and built a mill on Lake Whatcom. On April 1, 1913, the two companies reorganized into Bloedel Donovan Lumber Mills. Donovan served as the vice president and was in charge of the logging branch.

By 1917, the new company managed three sawmills, one in Bellingham and two in Larson; and two shingle mills, one in Larson and one in Blanchard. They owned logging camps and timber lands in Skagit and Whatcom counties, complete rolling stock, including six locomotives, and operated 30 miles (48 km) of railroad. The company used the most modern equipment of that time and provided work places for 600 men. The employees were provided with health care based on small assessments from their salaries, which assured doctors' examinations and treatment in all cases. These management techniques were supported and embedded by other big companies. Later, Donovan donated some land to the city, which became Bloedel Donovan Park.

==== Other activity in Bellingham ====
By 1903, Donovan directed companies that succeeded in mining coal and other minerals and in developing water power. He was one of the developers and conductors of the first hydraulic power plant of Whatcom County, on the Nooksack River.

Donovan was an officer in the Fairhaven Water Company, Copper River Oil & Mining Company, and Bellingham Bay Transportation Company. In 1900, Donovan moved his family from Fairhaven to Whatcom, Washington. He was interested in the development of the city's health care system, and became a member of the building committee for St. Joseph's Hospital on Elk Street, where he later worked as director. Ten years after the hospital was completed, Donovan partnered with other city businessmen to erect an additional hospital building between Fairhaven and Whatcom.

Donovan was president of the State Chamber of Commerce. Due to his influence, Fairhaven and Whatcom merged, and he was a member of the commission empowered to draft the charter for the new city of Bellingham. He was the president of the Bellingham Chamber of Commerce several times and served as the chairman of the city fortifications committee.

Donovan invested in real estate and owned a building on Holly Street in Bellingham. It was partially destroyed by fire in 1912, and Donovan planned the erection of the new modern brick building on its site.

Donovan held a vast array of other positions, including vice president of the First National Bank of Bellingham, trustee of the Bellingham State Normal School (Western Washington University), president of the Whatcom Commercial Club, and a member of the Bellingham Municipal Association, and Fairhaven Commercial Club.

=== Other positions and retirement ===
Donovan was vice president of the Pacific Highway Association. In 1912, he served on the State Legislature Committee empowered to draft expenses for building a system of trunk highways.

Donovan's other positions included:

- the president of the State Logged-off Land Association
- a member of the executive committee of the State Conservation Association
- the president of the Pacific Logging Congress (1913–1915)
- a chairman of the state commission on forest legislation
- a member of the Municipal League for Civic Reforms
- a member of the Commercial Club of Tacoma
- one of the founders and vice president of the Washington Good Roads Association
- a trustee of the Columbia Basin Irrigation project
- president of the Northwest Rivers and Harbors congress in 1926
- director of the National Foreign Trade Council

Due to illness, Donovan fully retired c. 1935.

== Political views ==
Donovan supported the Republican party and was known as "one of the leading Republicans of northwestern Washington." He often participated in political discussions, but declined offers to occupy official positions.

As a Republican, Donovan vehemently opposed the Ku Klux Klan during its ascent in the 1920s. In 1926, as chairman of the Tulip Festival parade, he forbid the Ku Klux Klan's participation in it. Prior to this event, he had presented his point of view concerning Ku Klux Klan beliefs in a Seattle Daily Times article. He also published other newspaper articles concerning important city and social subjects.

During his management of Bloedel Donovan Lumber Mills, Donovan instituted liberal policies. He supported a European compensation system for employees, establishing small salary assessments in order to provide his workers with medical care.

== Memberships in clubs and societies ==
In 1883, Donovan became a junior member of the American Society of Civil Engineers (ASCE), and four years later, a full member. In 1912, he was assigned as a member of the entertainment association for the ASCE's 44th annual society convention on the Pacific Coast. However, he couldn't attend the convention itself due to his obligations as a delegate of the Republican National Convention in Chicago.

He also held membership in other associations and clubs:

- Bellingham Country Club
- Washington State Art Association
- American Historical Society
- American Irish Historical Society
- Cougar Club of Bellingham
- Rainier Club of Seattle
- a lifetime member of the Navy League
- one of the founders and members of the Montana Society of Engineers
- held high offices in the Knights of Columbus
- was president of Twentieth Century Club and the New England Club
- was a member of the National Child Labor Committee, National Geographic Society, and National Municipal League.

== Personal life ==
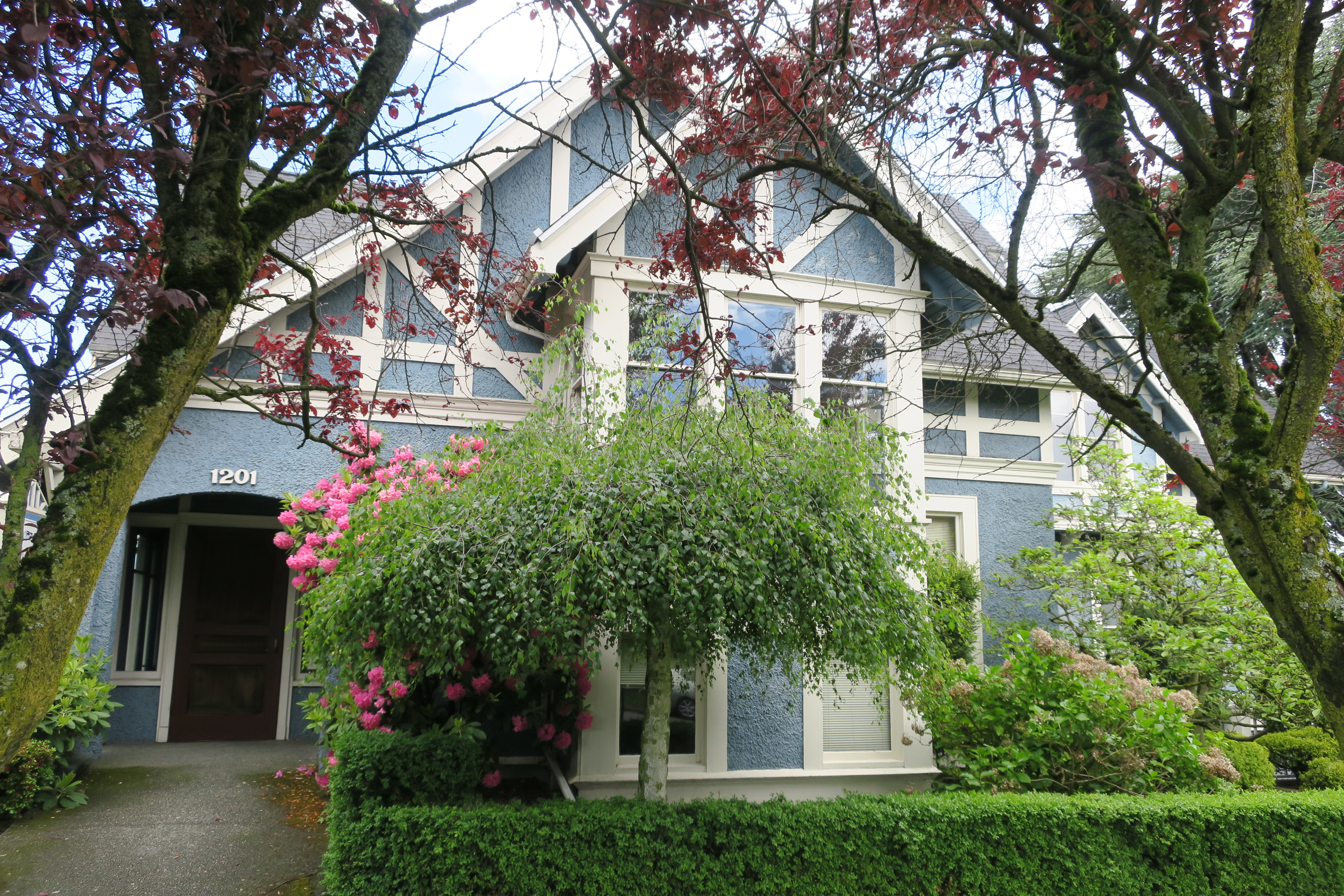
John Joseph Donovan's house, Bellingham, 2020. The house is currently used as a women's dormitory by Western Washington University.

On April 29, 1888, in Somerville, Massachusetts, Donovan married Clara Isabel Nichols, a piano teacher from Melrose. She died of cancer a year prior to him, in 1936. They had three children. Helen Elizabeth, born on December 28, 1889, was a graduate of Dana Hall School in Wellesley, Massachusetts and of Smith College, and a music student in Berlin, Germany. John or Jack Nichols, born on November 19, 1891, followed his father's footsteps, earning a degree in civil engineering from the Worcester Polytechnic Institute and working at the Northern Pacific Railroad Company for a year. He later became an efficiency engineer for the Bloedel Donovan Lumber Mills in Bellingham. Phillip, born on October 16, 1893, completed a course at the Worcester Polytechnic Institute in mechanical engineering, and worked as his father's secretary and purchasing agent.

Donovan belonged to the Catholic Church and was the president of the Catholic Federation of Washington.

In 1928, he studied American-Oriental trade during an Oriental tour with his wife.

In the last few years of his life, Donovan suffered from dementia. He died on January 9, 1937, in his home at 1201 North Garden Street, Bellingham, Washington. The funeral service was one of the largest ever held in the city, attended by more than 1,000 distinguished state citizens. His house was added to the National Register of Historic Places in 1983. Donovan's personal letters, business papers, diaries, and photographs, held by his descendants, became the basis for the museum exhibition Treasures from the Trunk at the Whatcom Museum, and a bronze statue in his honor was installed on the corner of 11th and Harris streets in Fairhaven.

== Literature cited ==
- Ward, Scott (ed.), "J.J. Donovan Returns to Fairhaven", fairhaven.com, Fairhaven: Fairhaven
- Longfellow, J. H., ed. (February 10, 1912), "Building", Pacific Builder and Engineer, vol. 13, no. 6, Seattle: Fuller Publishing Company, p. 128, LCCN 43021386, OCLC 18166390
- Longfellow, J. H., ed. (April 27, 1912), "Talk special session for roads bonds", Pacific Builder and Engineer, vol. 13, no. 17, Seattle: Fuller Publishing Company, p. 7, LCCN 43021386, OCLC 18166390
- Longfellow, J. H., ed. (June 22, 1912), "Personnel of Local Entertainment Association", Pacific Builder and Engineer, vol. 13, no. 25, Seattle: Fuller Publishing Company, pp. 524–529, LCCN 43021386, OCLC 18166390
- Twentieth century – Successful Americans – Local and national (PDF), United Press Service Bureau, 1917, LCCN 17008382, OCLC 14245923
- "Death comes to business leader", Centralia Daily Chronicle, Centralia: Lafromboise Communications, p. 4, January 11, 1937, LCCN sn86071991, OCLC 22107864 – via NewspaperArchive
- "Death summons J. J. Donovan, state leader", Seattle Daily Times, vol. 60, no. 11, Seattle: The Seattle Times Company, pp. 1, 9, January 11, 1937, ISSN 2639-4898, LCCN sn86072007, OCLC 1765328
- "J. J. Donovan taken by death", The Spokesman-Review, Spokane: Cowles Company, p. 13, January 11, 1937, ISSN 1064-7317, LCCN sn84024754, OCLC 11102610 – via Newspapers.com
- "Notables of state at Donovan rites", The Spokesman-Review, Spokane: Cowles Company, p. 14, January 13, 1937, ISSN 1064-7317, LCCN sn84024754, OCLC 11102610 – via Newspapers.com
- Griffin, Brian (2015), Fairhaven : a history, Bellingham: Knox Cellars Publishing Company, OCLC 944242714
- Hunt, Herbert; Kaylor, Floyd C. (1917), Washington, west of the Cascades; historical and descriptive; the explorers, the Indians, the pioneers, the modern, Chicago: S. J. Clarke Publishing Company, LCCN 18015511, OCLC 10086413
- Jentges, Cecil W. (2015), Bellingham, Charleston: Arcadia Publishing, ISBN 9781467132756, LCCN 2014944691, OCLC 894931954
- Prosser, William Farrand (1903), Lewis, Edward Gardner (ed.), A history of the Puget Sound country, its resources, its commerce and its people, New York City: Edward Gardner Lewis, LCCN 05013767
- Snowden, Clinton A. (1909), Hanford, Cornelius; Moore, Miles Conway; Tyler, William D.; Chadwick, Stephen J. (eds.), History of Washington: The Rise and Progress of an American State, New York: The Century History Company, LCCN 09028416, OCLC 2827985
