= History of Bellingham, Washington =

The history of Bellingham, Washington, as it is now known, begins with the settling of Whatcom County in the mid-to-late 19th century.

The name of Bellingham is derived from the bay on which the city is situated. George Vancouver, who visited the area in June 1792, named the bay for Sir William Bellingham, the controller of the storekeeper's account of the Royal Navy.

== First peoples ==
Before the first wave of European settlers reached the area about 1853, the coastal areas around Bellingham Bay and the surrounding islands had been inhabited for thousands of years by Coast Salish peoples. The land on which Bellingham is located was ceded to European Americans by the local Native American tribes, including the Lummi (or Lhaq'temish) people, in the controversial Treaty of Point Elliott (1855). The Lummi people continue to live in the area, many of them on Lummi Peninsula across the bay from the present-day City of Bellingham.

== European settlers ==
Local history and legend credit one "Blanket" Bill Jarman as the first white man to reside in the area, possibly held captive by native peoples from 1841-1843.

The first substantial settlement was located on the north shore of Whatcom Creek where Whatcom Falls empties into the bay, a place the native peoples called What-coom (spelled Whatcom by the settlers), meaning "noisy water." It was at this location that schooner Capt. Henry Roeder and Russel Peabody set up a lumber mill in Dec 1852, having been told of the falls location by Lummi leader Cha-wit-zit while south in Olympia, Washington. The mill operated sporadically until destroyed by a fire in 1873, revived in 1881 by a group of settlers from Kansas, and abandoned in 1885.

South of Whatcom Creek, two scouts named Henry Hewitt and William Brown, who were working for Henry Roeder's lumber mill, found coal seams on their property. Roeder, Hewitt, and Brown sold the property containing coal to a group of San Francisco investors in 1854, which established the Bellingham Bay Coal Company. They opened the Sehome Mine, at the present Laurel Street in Bellingham, in 1855 which operated until 1878. The community called Sehome (named after a member of the nearby Samish tribe) continued until it merged with Whatcom in 1891, becoming New Whatcom.

Meanwhile, Daniel Jefferson Harris (aka Dirty Dan) arrived in the Bellingham Bay area in 1853 or 1854, and befriended John Thomas, who had filed a land claim along Padden Creek. He helped Thomas start a cabin there, but Thomas died before the cabin was finished. Dan finished the claim on the land and the patented was issued in 1871. He also acquired several surrounding properties and named this area Fairhaven, from the native name see-see-lich-em, meaning safe port or fair haven (possibly also from a town in Maine that may or may not have been his birthplace). He platted the town in 1883, and started selling lots. As his fortune improved so did his appears and reputation, allowing him to marry in 1885. In 1888, he sold most of his property in Fairhaven to Nelson Bennett and left for California. Nelson Bennett, along with Charles Larrabee, who arrived in 1890, formed the Fairhaven Land Company, mostly financed by Larrabee, determined to grow Fairhaven into a major city. They promoted the land rich in natural resources, good weather, and endless possibilities, causing the population to grow from around 150 in 1889 to 8000 at the end of 1890. Part of that increase was due to the purchase by the Fairhaven Land Company of a tiny settlement called Bellingham, tucked between Sehome and Fairhaven, which had a post office starting in 1883.

In August 1856, the U.S. Army started construction on Fort Bellingham to prevent attacks on the bayside villages of Fairhaven, Sehome and Whatcom. The fort was built by U.S. Army Captain George E. Pickett and Company D of the 9th U.S. Infantry Regiment sent from Fort Steilacoom. It was constructed on the only open space on the bay that had a spring, a prairie overlooking the bay. A settler, Maria Roberts, had to be evicted to build the fort, but she and her husband were later allowed to build a cabin on the beach. In July 1859, units stationed at the fort were in involved in the Pig War, during and after which parts of the fort were disassembled and transported to the southern tip of San Juan Island, creating "Camp Pickett" later called "Post of San Juan". The fort officially closed in 1863, and in 1868, the Army returned 320 acres (1.3 km^{2}) to Mrs. Roberts, who lived there for many years thereafter and farmed the land. The settlement around her property, originally called Lummi, after the local tribe, was later called Marietta. The officer's quarters (that housed Capt. George E. Pickett and his Indian wife) is preserved at 910 Bancroft Street on what was called Peabody Hill, now the Lettered Streets neighborhood of Bellingham, Washington.

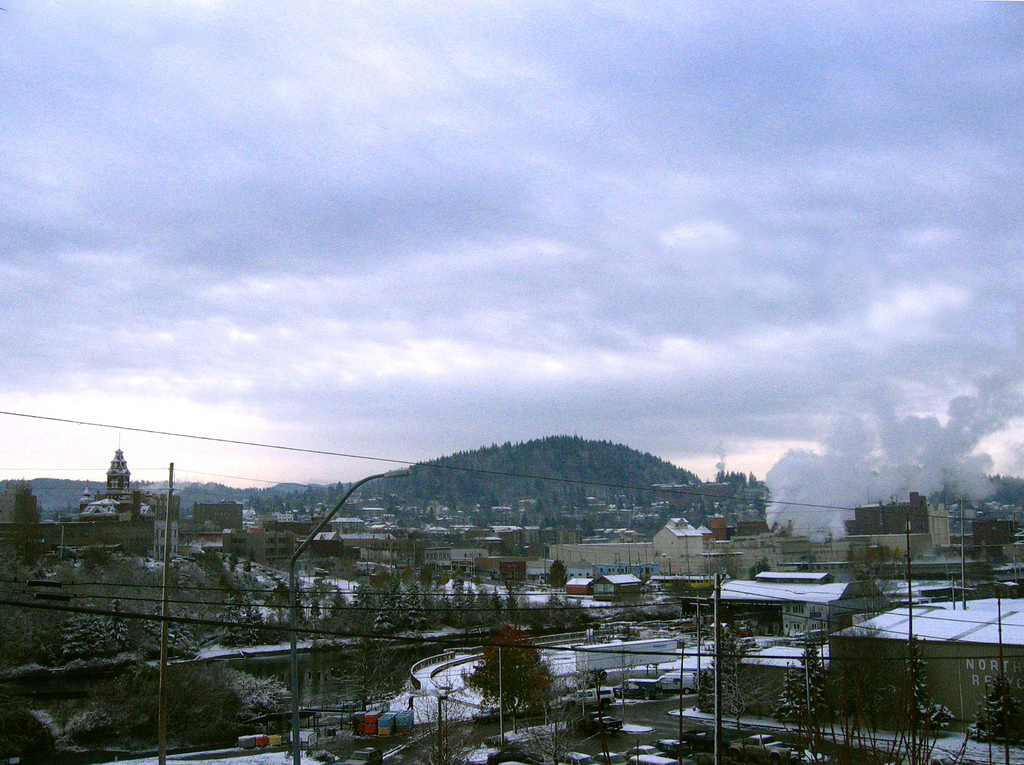
Whatcom Creek, South Downtown Bellingham, and Sehome Hill as seen from Maritime Heritage Park. The mouth of Whatcom Creek is obscured to the lower right.

== Mining Towns ==
In 1858, the Fraser Canyon Gold Rush caused thousands of miners, storekeepers, and scalawags to head north from California. Whatcom grew overnight from a small northwest mill town to a bustling seaport, the basetown for the Whatcom Trail, which led to the Fraser Canyon goldfields, used in open defiance of colonial Governor James Douglas's edict that all entry to the gold colony be made via Victoria, British Columbia. The first brick building in Washington was built this same year, the T. G. Richards and Company Store. The building, which still stands today and is being restored, later became the territorial courthouse until 1884.

The first newspaper in Whatcom County, the Northern Light, was published by William Bausman during the boom. Just as soon as it started, the boom went bust with the miners being forced to stop at Victoria, B.C. for a permit before heading to the mining fields. Whatcom's population dropped almost as quickly as it had grown, and the sleepy little town on the bay returned.

Coal mining was commonplace near town from the mid-19th to mid-20th centuries. Coal was originally discovered by Henry Roeder's agents off the northeastern shore of Bellingham Bay. In 1854, a group of San Francisco investors established Bellingham Bay Coal Company. By 1866, Darius Ogden Mills purchased and reorganized the company, making it a subsidiary of his Black Diamond Coal Mining Company. The Sehome Coal Mine, just south of Whatcom, employed 100 people in 1860. Under the management of Pierre B. Cornwall, the mine operated profitably until its closure in 1878. By this time, Black Diamond had acquired a considerable amount of land around Bellingham Bay, and throughout the next 19 years, Cornwall focused the company's efforts on the sale of its real estate. The Blue Canyon Mine, at the south end of Lake Whatcom, opened in 1891 with solid investment, and supplied lower-grade bituminous coal for the United States Pacific Fleet. Twenty-three workers died in huge explosion on April 8, 1895, Washington's worst industrial accident to date. The Blue Canyon Mine closed in 1917, having produced 250,000 tons of coal. That same year, the Bellingham Coal Mines opened near present-day Northwest and Birchwood Avenues. The mine extended to hundreds of miles of tunnels as deep as 1,200 feet (370 m). It ran southwest to Bellingham Bay, on both sides of Squalicum Creek, an area of about one square mile (2.6 km^{2}). At its peak in the 1920s, the mine employed some 250 miners digging over 200,000 tons of coal annually. It was closed in 1955.

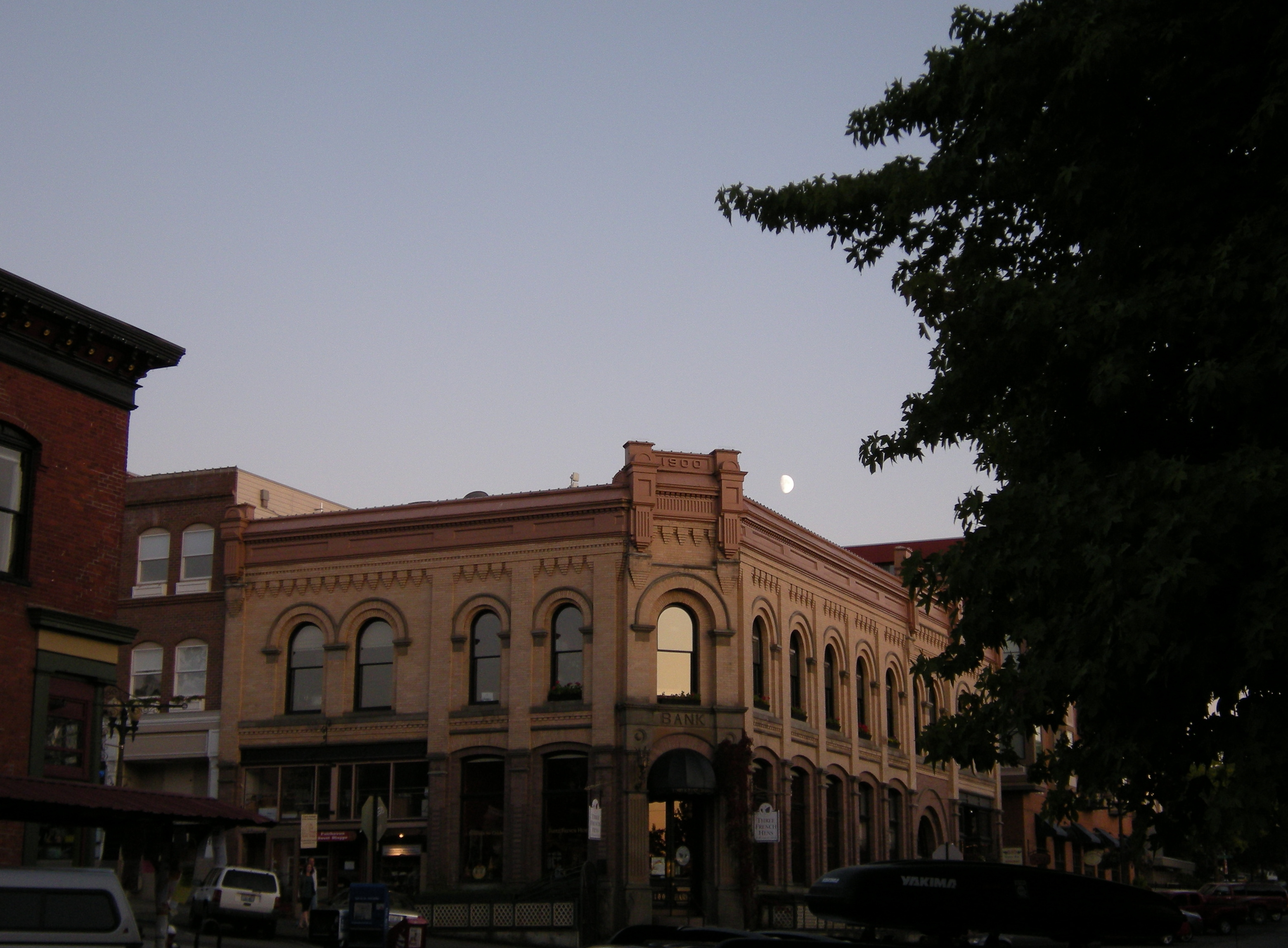
1890 bank building in the Fairhaven District at dusk (2008).

== Growth and consolidation ==
In 1889, Cornwall and an association of investors formed the Bellingham Bay Improvement Company (BBIC). The company was mostly composed of wealthy California businessmen who were investing heavily into Bellingham with the vision that it would one day become an important urban center for commerce and trade. The BBIC invested in several diverse enterprises such as shipping, coal, mining, railroad construction, real estate sales and utilities. Even though their dream of turning Bellingham into a Pacific Northwest metropolis never came to fruition, the BBIC made an immense contribution to the economic development of the area. The BBIC had the franchise for providing electricity to the cities on the bay, which at that time primarily went to street lighting and electric streetcars. However, by 1903 the small generator powering the urban area was proving to be inadequate for the growing population. The BBIC began developing a hydroelectric plant on the north fork of the Nooksack River, below Nooksack Falls. However, all the difficulties of maintaining a generator and trying to construct the Nooksack site took its toll on BBIC. In 1905 the board of directors announced the sale of its utility holdings to Stone & Webster.

BBIC was not the only outside firm with an interest in the utilities of these communities. The General Electric Company of New York purchased the Fairhaven Line and New Whatcom street rail line in 1897. In 1898 the utility merged into the Northern Railway and Improvement Company which prompted the Electric Corporation of Boston to purchase a large block of shares. Stone & Webster was also involved in Puget Sound area railways including a considerable amount in Seattle, Tacoma and Everett. By 1902, Stone & Webster had acquired the Fairhaven and New Whatcom lines. Over the next several months Northern Railway and Improvement sold the rest of its holdings which included Fairhaven Electric Light, Power and Motor Company and the Whatcom-Fairhaven Gas Company. Stone & Webster organized these under the umbrella name of the Whatcom County Railway and Light Company.

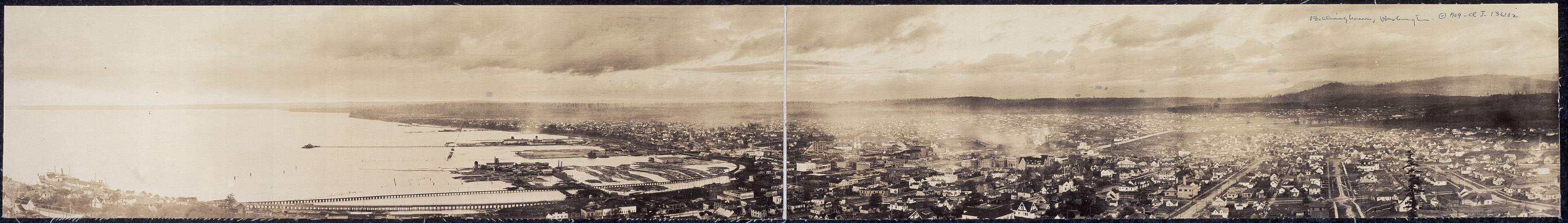
Bellingham circa 1909

One of the obstacles to further growth and prosperity foreseen by the promoters and investors was the competition among the cities along the bay. Hence, Fairhaven purchased Bellingham in 1890, Whatcom and Sehome merged into New Whatcom in 1891 (it reverted to Whatcom in 1903 when the state legislature outlawed "New" as part of town names.) The final consolidation between Whatcom and Fairhaven did not succeed until the end of 1903, after a failed attempt in the mid-90s. The name "Bellingham" was proposed as a compromise name, since they bordered Bellingham Bay, and neither community wished to be lose its identity to the other.

The City of Bellingham was incorporated following a special vote October 27, 1903 which won 2,163 to 596. The consolidation was approved on November 4, 1903. A new mayor and City Council were elected and installed on December 28, 1903. Newspapers placed the exact time of the birth of Bellingham on that day at 10:11 p.m.

The foothills around Bellingham were clearcut after the 1906 San Francisco earthquake to help provide the lumber for the rebuilding of San Francisco. In time, lumber and shingle mills sprang up all over the county to accommodate the byproduct of their work.

The Bellingham Riots occurred on September 5, 1907. A group of 400-500 white men with intentions to exclude East Indian immigrants from the local work force mobbed waterfront barracks. The white men beat and hospitalized 6 Indians while 410 Indians were jailed. By the next day, most East Indians had fled town, followed by many residents of Chinese, Japanese, and Filipino descent. No actions were taken against the perpetrators. On the 100th anniversary of the riots, Bellingham Mayor Tim Douglas proclaimed a "day of healing and reconciliation" in recognition of the event.

A fictionalized account of the history of early Bellingham is "The Living" by Annie Dillard.

== Evolution of the University ==
The year 1899 saw the completion of the main building (now called Old Main) of the New Whatcom Normal School, a teachers college located on Sehome hill. By the 1930s, the school had become the Western Washington College of Education, maintaining its focus on teacher training. In 1961 the school had grown into a broad degree-granting institution and was renamed the Western Washington State College. Today, student enrollment at Western Washington University stands around 14,000 students.

== Late 20th century ==
=== Pipeline accident ===
On June 10, 1999, the Olympic pipeline ruptured in Whatcom Falls Park near Whatcom Creek, leaking 237,000 US gallons (897 m³) of gasoline into the creek. The NTSB determined that the probable cause of the accident was the damage done by an IMCO construction crew while conducting modifications to a water treatment plant, but not reported to Olympic or any agency authorities. The 400-mile (640 km) pipeline carries gasoline, diesel and jet fuel from four refineries to the Renton, Washington distribution center and to locations as far south as Portland, Oregon, including all the fuel for Seattle-Tacoma International Airport. The four refineries are the BP's Cherry Point Refinery and ConocoPhillips' refinery both at Ferndale, Washington and Shell Oil Company's refinery and Tesoro's refinery both at Anacortes, Washington.

The vapor layer from the spill overcame an 18-year-old man, Liam Gordon Wood, who was fishing in the creek; he fell into the creek and subsequently drowned. An explosion was set off by two young boys playing with a fireplace lighter and burned over a mile (1.6 km) of the creek bed and sent a black smoke cloud over 30,000 feet (10 km) into the air. Steven Tsiorvias and Wade King, both age 10, were students at nearby Roosevelt Elementary School. They were discovered by firefighters immediately and rushed to St. Joseph's Hospital. The boys were airlifted to Harborview Medical Center in Seattle. They died the next day due to extensive burns from proximity to the blast. Although some buildings were destroyed, due to road closures and evacuations around the creek, there were no further fatalities. The explosion resulted in over $45 million in property damage. Several years later, the families of the pipeline victims sued Olympic Pipeline Company and settled for around $100 million in damages, which they pledged would help support pipeline safety and provide legal representation for pipeline accident victims.

Because of the efforts of the Tsiorvias and King families, whose children died in the tragedy, the U.S. Department of Justice worked to make $4 million of the criminal settlement with the pipeline companies available to start the independent Pipeline Safety Trust. The Pipeline Safety Trust is now the only independent non-profit organization working to ensure greater safety of the pipelines that run through communities nationwide.

The population of Bellingham is 93,896 (2022)

== See also ==
- Bellingham riots
- List of mayors of Bellingham, Washington
- Pipeline transport
- List of pipeline accidents

=== Archives ===
- Lottie Roeder Roth historical sketch. circa 1903. 13 pages. Labor Archives of Washington State, University of Washington Libraries Special Collections.
