= Sehome (disambiguation) =

Sehome Hill Arboretum is a park on Sehome Hill in Bellingham, Washington.

Sehome may also refer to:

- Sehome (neighborhood), a neighborhood near the park
- Sehome High School, a high school in Bellingham
