= Fairhaven and Southern Railroad =

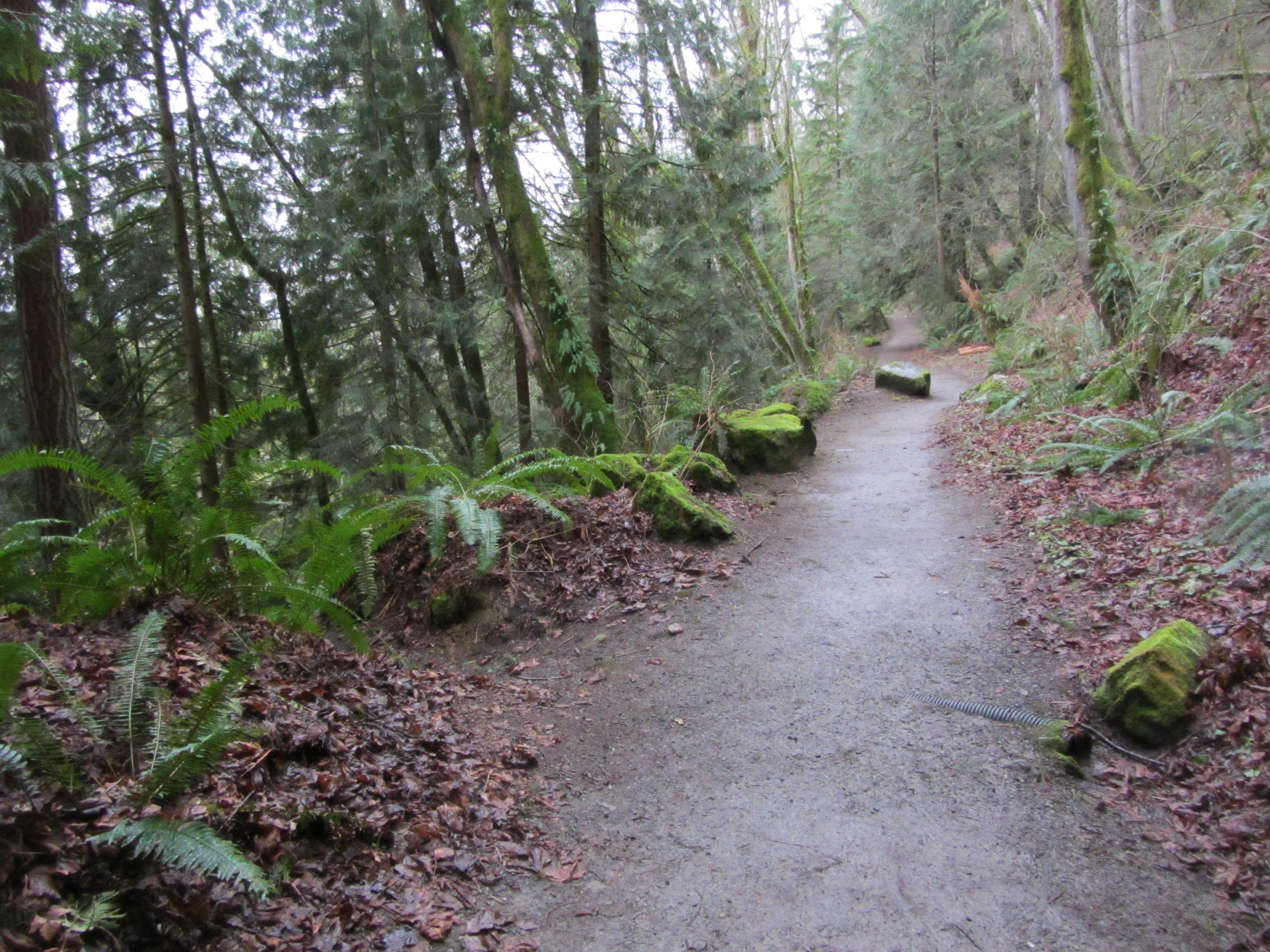
Former right-of-way near Squires Lake

The Fairhaven and Southern Railroad and its successor the Seattle and Montana Railroad were railroads in northwest part of the U.S. state of Washington, active in the late 19th and early 20th centuries. They ran roughly south from Blaine, Washington on the U.S.-Canada border. The Fairhaven and Southern operated 1888-1898 and ran to Sedro (part of today's Sedro-Woolley). It operated from December 1891 as part of the Seattle and Montana Railway, and was merged with that into its successor, the Seattle and Montana Railroad, both of which extended service south to Seattle. The Seattle and Montana operated until 1907 when it merged into the Great Northern Railway Company.

== History ==
=== Fairhaven and Southern ===
The Fairhaven and Southern Railroad in the northwest part of Washington State was built by the Fairhaven Land Co., founded by E. M. Wilson, E. L. Cowgill, Nelson Bennett, C. X. Larrabee, and Samuel E. Larrabee. Because the Bellingham Bay and British Columbia Railroad were already building to the north, the initial independent F & S railroad headed south, first to the coal mines in Skagit County then to a connection with the Seattle and Northern Railroad.

The Fairhaven and Southern was incorporated November 27, 1888. Work on the road began in 1889 in Fairhaven, Washington, now part of Bellingham. The line was surveyed towards Lake Samish towards what is now Sedro-Woolley, Washington. The line reached the coal mines in Skagit county in 1890, and began operating on a partial line February 1, 1890. That initial line was completed June 28, 1890, running from Fairhaven to Sedro and, according to an early timetable, completing the trip in 50 minutes. The ICC lists it in June 1890 as in operating independent with 26 miles (42 km) of track.

The line soon became a part of James J. Hill and Thomas Burke's plan to connect the growing city of Seattle to the Canadian main line railways. The franchise for the line was transferred to Hill's Great Northern in June 1890. An ICC listing June 30, 1891 shows the Fairhaven and Southern as an operating subsidiary of the Great Northern, with 51 miles (82 km) of track; the Seattle and Montana was an operating subsidiary of the Great Northern throughout its existence. These were part of a through route for between Seattle and Vancouver, British Columbia. Tracks were rapidly extended from Fairhaven north to Blaine, with the entire project completed between August 16 and October 25, 1890. By December 6, 1890, the coal branch extended 16 miles (26 km) from Sedro to Cokedale (now a ghost town), where a good supply of coal could be obtained.

The whole line was completed with a golden spike ceremony at Fairhaven on February 14, 1891, when the Fairhaven and Southern was connected to the Seattle and Montana near Burlington, Washington.

As late as November 1891, the Fairhaven and Southern was listed as an independent railway in the Official Guide, but beginning December 7, 1891 it is listed as part of the Seattle and Montana, with a single service extending from Seattle to Blaine and continuing across the border to South Westminster, British Columbia, with the Seattle-Blaine run taking 5:55, and an additional 1:35 to South Westminster.

The Fairhaven and Southern was listed by the ICC as 51 miles (82 km) in June 1891; in June 1893, it was reduced to 41 miles (66 km). That number remained the same until its sale to the Seattle and Montana.

That combined road was later connected to the Great Northern, and later bought out by same.

=== Seattle and Montana ===
The Seattle and Montana Railway Company incorporated March 7, 1890 and is listed by the ICC on June 30, 1893 as an operating subsidiary of the Great Northern with 78 miles (126 km) of track owned and in use. Between June 6, 1891 and October 3, 1891, it laid 78.5 miles (126.3 km) of track from Seattle to F&S Junction (that is, Fairhaven and Southern Junction) in the Sedro-Wooley/Burlington area, and opened for business on that entire length December 4, 1891. As indicated above, the published route continued north past F&S Junction on the tracks of the Fairhaven and Southern, giving Seattle a link north to Canada.

The Seattle and Montana Railroad Company was incorporated March 29, 1898 and purchased the Fairhaven and Southern the following day, consolidating it with the earlier Seattle and Montana Railway Company that had been incorporated March 7, 1890. On June 30, 1898, the ICC lists the Seattle and Montana with 137 miles (220 km) owned and operated.

On February 1, 1902, the Seattle and Montana also purchased the Seattle and Northern Railway Company which, despite its name, owned and operated only a line running roughly west to east from Anacortes, Washington to Rockport, Washington and running through Woolley, close enough to Sedro that the two were eventually incorporated into present-day Sedro-Woolley The merged line is listed as 181 miles (291 km) in 1902 and 192 miles (309 km) in 1904. Records suggest that there may have been significant rebuilding of the main north-south line from 1902 to 1906.
