= Virginia Wright (art collector) =

American art collector and philanthropist (1929–2020)

- Born: Virginia Bloedel; January 1, 1929; Seattle, Washington, U.S.
- Died: February 18, 2020 (aged 91); Seattle, Washington, U.S.
- Other name: Virginia Bloedel Wright
- Education: Masters School; Barnard College (BA)
- Occupations: Philanthropist, art collector
- Spouse: Bagley Wright
- Relatives: Julius Bloedel (grandfather)

Virginia "Jinny" Wright (January 1, 1929 – February 18, 2020), also known as Virginia Bloedel Wright, was an American art collector and philanthropist. She was considered one of the top art collectors in America for having created the largest collection of modern and contemporary art of the Pacific Northwest with her husband Bagley Wright and was credited for having played a pivotal role in the cultural development of Seattle and the Pacific Northwest.

== Biography ==
Wright was born in Seattle on January 1, 1929, to timber baron Prentice Bloedel, son of Julius Bloedel, who co-founded MacMillan Bloedel, and Virginia Merrill Bloedel. She grew up in Vancouver, graduated from the Masters School in Dobbs Ferry, New York, and received her BA degree from Barnard College, where she studied under noted art historians Meyer Schapiro and Julius S. Held, who inspired her to pursue a career in the appreciation and collection of modern art. Wright called Schapiro's influence on her art collection career "like the Conversion of St. Paul."

After Barnard, Wright worked at the Sidney Janis Gallery, where she met her future husband Bagley Wright. They married in 1953 and in 1955 relocated to Seattle, where Wright invested in real-estate and civic projects, including the development of the Space Needle and Seattle Center. While working at the Janis Gallery, Wright bought No. 10 from Mark Rothko for $1,000.

Wright joined the board of the Seattle Art Museum (SAM) in 1960 and started the Virginia Wright Fund, a project that began with $1 million investment from her father to buy public art. The fund donated several well-known sculptures public sculptures to Seattle, including the Broken Obelisk by Barnett Newman, and the campus of Western Washington University, which became known as the Western Washington University Public Sculpture Collection. She was a board member from 1960 to 1972, before rejoining in 1982 and serving as its president from 1986 to 1992. She helped grow the museum's endowment to more than $100 million, relocate to its present downtown location, and helped establish the Olympic Sculpture Park.

Wright was also a docent at the SAM, leading tours, giving lectures about art at the museum, and taught courses at the Lakeside School. She ran her own art gallery in Seattle, Current Editions, from 1968 to 1975. She also ran the Wright Exhibition Space, a free venue which showed selections from her personal art collection and operated from 1999 to 2014.

In 1975, Wright founded the Washington Art Consortium, a collective of seven Washington state art museums, including Henry Art Gallery at the University of Washington; the Museum of Art of Washington State University at Pullman; the Northwest Museum of Arts and Culture, Spokane; the Seattle Art Museum; the Tacoma Art Museum; the Western Gallery at Western Washington University, Bellingham, which houses the collection; and the Whatcom Museum, Bellingham. The purpose of the consortium was to bring great works of art to Washington state and encouraging collaboration among its members, and the collection included artworks by Jackson Pollock, Agnes Martin, Susan Rothenberg, Jasper Johns, and Larry Clark. The consortium disbanded in 2017 after it had grown to include more than 400 works of 20th-century American art and a $2.3 million endowment.

== Philanthropy ==
Wright donated more than 200 works to SAM over her lifetime, including works by Roy Lichtenstein, Frank Stella, Helen Frankenthaler, among others.

In addition to SAM, she was also a major donor to her alma mater, Barnard College. 2011, she donated a $25,000 sculpture by Jenny Holzer to Barnard in honor of her classmate and Barnard art historian Barbara J. Novak. She also endowed a professorship in art history as well as the Virginia B. Wright Art History Prize at Barnard.

== Personal life ==
Wright died on February 18, 2020, at the age of 91. She was survived by her four children, 10 grandchildren, and nine great-grandchildren. She lived at the Four Seasons Hotel and Private Residences, Seattle, from 2008 until her death.
