= Julius Bloedel =

American businessman and entrepreneur

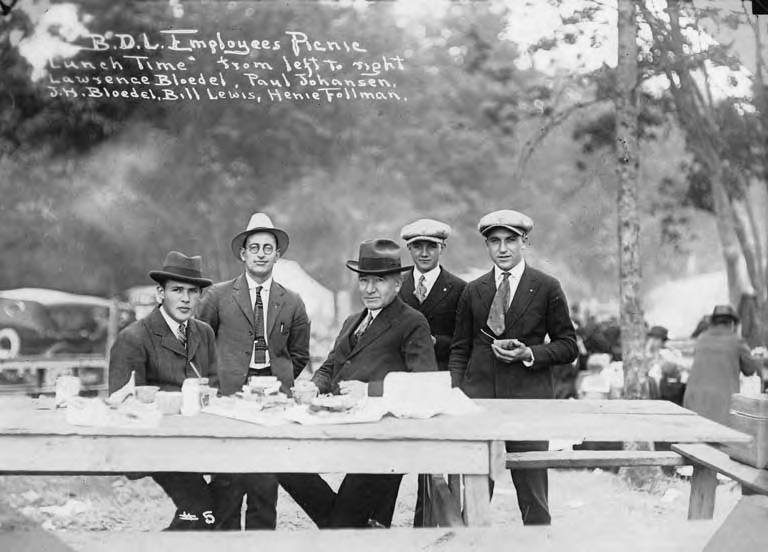
- Bloedel-Donovan Lumber Employees Picnic, 'Lunch Time' from left to right Lawrence Bloedel, Paul Johansen, J.H. Bloedel. Bill Lewis, Henie Follman, July 22, 1922
- Born: Julius Harold Bloedel; March 4, 1864; Fond du Lac, Wisconsin
- Died: September 21, 1957 (aged 93); Seattle, Washington
- Occupation: Timber merchant
- Known for: Co-founding Bloedel, Stewart and Welch
- Relatives: Virginia Wright (granddaughter)

Julius Harold Bloedel (March 4, 1864 – September 21, 1957) was an American businessman and entrepreneur who operated primarily in the Pacific Northwest region of the United States and Canada.

== Biography ==
Born in Fond du Lac, Wisconsin, Bloedel moved from Wisconsin to Fairhaven, Washington (later Bellingham) in 1890, where he became president of Fairhaven National Bank. He engaged in several frontier business ventures, including the Samish Lake Lumber and Mill Company, Blue Canyon Coal Mines, and, as mentioned, the Fairhaven National Bank. He partnered and worked closely with the Bellingham pioneers. Although many of these operations folded eventually, Bloedel's financial know-how managed to keep him afloat through a series of boom-and-bust economic trials. In August 1898, he founded the Whatcom Logging Company with fellow frontier businessmen John Joseph Donovan and Peter Larson, which would later become known as the Bloedel-Donovan Lumber Mills. A park with this name exists today in Bellingham, which sits on the site of Bloedel's first lumber mill, which he dedicated as a park in 1946.

Using his existing operation in Bellingham as collateral, he began acquiring land in Canada, hoping to expand his lumber operation. In 1911, he and two new partners, John Stewart and Patrick Welch, came to Canada and began acquiring large blocks of forests on British Columbia's Vancouver Island. The Bloedel, Stewart and Welch operation eventually overshadowed Bloedel's previous ventures and their Franklin River logging camp soon became one of the world's largest logging operations. Here, in the 1930s, the Canadian logging industry saw its first steel spar and chainsaw. Welch and Stewart were also contractors on the construction of the Pacific Great Eastern Railway, operating with another partner as Foley, Welch & Stewart.

In the fall of 1911, the same year he started his Canadian logging operation, he moved to Seattle, where he lived with his wife, Mina Louise Prentice. He had three children: Prentice, Lawrence, and Charlotte. Julius Bloedel died in Seattle in 1957.

In the 1950s, now under the direction of his son Prentice, Bloedel's company merged with the HR MacMillan Company to form one of the largest forest products companies in the world. MacMillan Bloedel Limited, often called just "Mac-Blo", was eventually taken over by Weyerhaeuser in 1999. Bloedel Hall at the University of Washington in Seattle was named for Julius Bloedel. The Bloedel Conservatory of Queen Elizabeth Park in Vancouver was named for his son Prentice Bloedel for donating nearly $1.4 million for its construction in 1967. The Bloedel Reserve on Bainbridge Island, Washington, was created by Prentice Bloedel and his wife Virginia.

His son Lawrence Bloedel was the librarian of Williams College. Upon his death, his collection of 300 artworks was bequeathed to the Whitney Museum of American Art and to the Williams College Museum of Art. After Lawrence's death, his widow, Eleanore Bloedel, bequeathed Field Farm in Williamstown, Massachusetts to The Trustees of Reservations. His granddaughter, Virginia Wright, married businessman Bagley Wright and was a prominent art collector and philanthropist who played a key role in the arts scene of the Pacific Northwest.
