= Bagley Wright =

American real estate developer and philanthropist

- Born: Charles Bagley Wright; April 13, 1924; Marietta, Georgia
- Died: July 18, 2011 (aged 87); Seattle, Washington
- Education: Princeton University
- Occupation: Philanthropist
- Spouse: Virginia Wright

Bagley Wright (April 13, 1924 – July 18, 2011) was an American real estate developer and philanthropist. He was president of Bagley Wright Investments, was a developer of Seattle's landmark Space Needle and chair of Physio Control Corp. from 1968 until its acquisition by Eli Lilly and Company in 1980. Wright and his wife Virginia were well known art patrons and philanthropists.

== Background ==
Wright, who has been called the "patron saint of the arts" in Seattle, began his career as a newspaper reporter and editor in New York City. In 1956 he moved to the Seattle area, where he started his own real estate development company.

As a child, Wright moved with his family to Long Island, New York, first settling in Great Neck, and then moving to an Aspinwall & Simpson-designed home on Elderfields Road in the nearby village of Flower Hill around 1940. He attended Phillips Exeter Academy and graduated from Princeton University in 1946.

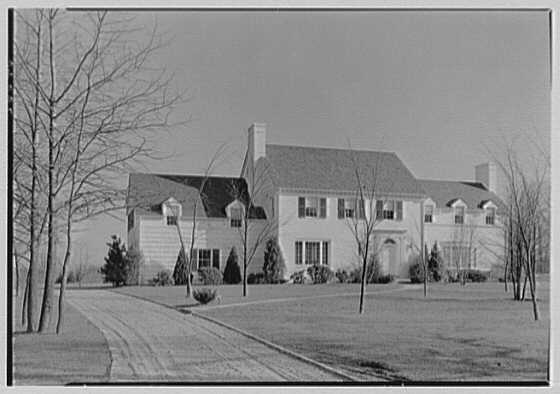
Bagley Wright's home on Elderfields Road in Flower Hill, New York.

Bagley Wright was one of the five principal developers who organized the Pentagram Corporation to build the 605-foot Space Needle, then the tallest structure west of the Mississippi River, which was completed for the 1962 Seattle World's Fair. The other four partners were contractor Howard S. Wright, architect John Graham, financier Ned Skinner, and timber magnate Norton Clapp. In 1977 Bagley Wright, Skinner, and Clapp sold their interests to Howard S. Wright.

In the 1950s, Wright and his wife Virginia "Jinny" Wright, who studied art at Barnard College, began collecting art with paintings by Mark Rothko, Franz Kline, and Barnett Newman. The Virginia and Bagley Wright Collection grew to more than 200 works, becoming the most extensive collection of modern and contemporary art in the Pacific Northwest. Virginia Wright was the daughter of Prentice Bloedel from a prominent Pacific Northwest timber family who co-founded MacMillan Bloedel, one of the largest forest products companies in the world.

The Wrights made a point of collecting the art of their time, adding works by Helen Frankenthaler, David Smith, Kenneth Noland, Anthony Caro, Donald Judd, Carl Andre, Claes Oldenburg, Ellsworth Kelly, Tony Smith, Ed Ruscha, John Chamberlain, Mark Di Suvero, David Salle, Julian Schnabel, Gerhard Richter, Sigmar Polke, David Hammons, Robert Gober, Kiki Smith, John Currin, Maurizio Cattelan and Roxy Paine. Some of the collection was featured in a special exhibit at the Seattle Art Museum, where Wright once served as acting director. In 2007 the Wrights pledged their collection to the Seattle Art Museum and the Olympic Sculpture Park.

Wright also served as founding president of the Seattle Repertory Theatre, which later honored him by naming its theater for him, and had been a board member of the Seattle Symphony. Wright started the fund drive for the Seattle Symphony's Benaroya Hall.

== See also ==
- Seattle Art Museum
- Seattle Art Museum Olympic Sculpture Park
- Seattle Repertory Theatre
- Seattle Symphony
