= Field Farm (Williamstown, Massachusetts) =

Farm in Williamstown, Massachusetts

Coordinates: 42°39′58″N 73°15′40″W

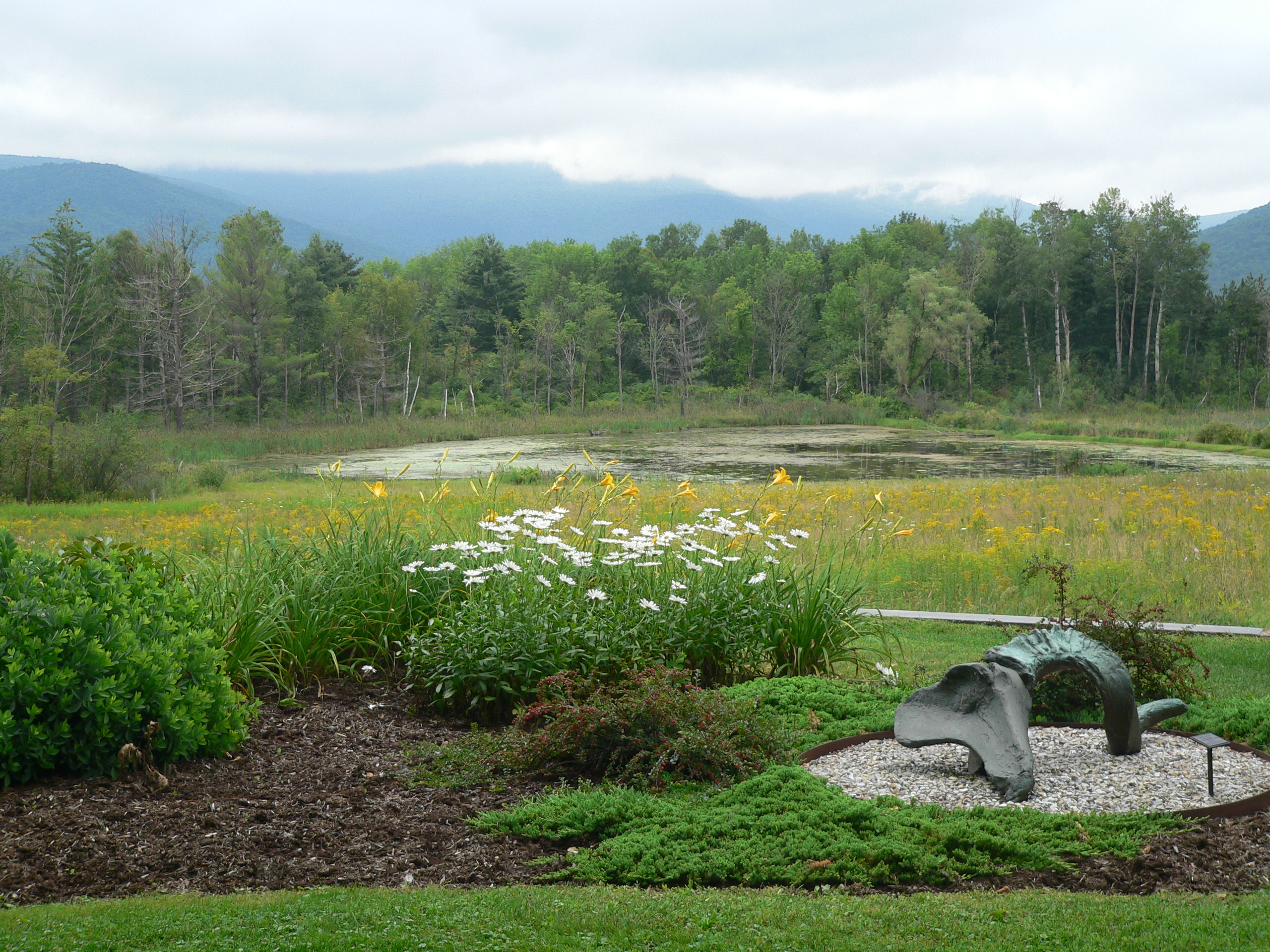
Sculpture and pond at Field Farm

Field Farm is a 316-acre (1.28 km^{2}) nature preserve and farm in Williamstown, Massachusetts, managed by the Trustees of Reservations. There are 4.5 miles (7.2 km) of hiking trails on the reservation, which pass by swamp land, a pond, and the "Caves Lot" which features underground channels that water had cut into the limestone there. An International Style house, built in 1948 by Edwin Goodell, is operated as a bed and breakfast inn. Also on the site is The Folly, a small guest house designed by Ulrich Franzen in 1966. The Folly is currently open for guided tours. The property also contains a sculpture garden.

The property was donated to the Trustees in 1984 by Eleanore Bloedel, the widow of Lawrence Bloedel. Lawrence Bloedel was the librarian of Williams College and a son of businessman Julius Bloedel. Bloedel was a noted art collector. Upon his death, his collection of 300 artworks was bequeathed to the Whitney Museum of American Art and to the Williams College Museum of Art. Some of the artworks donated to Williams are on display at Field Farm, on loan to The Trustees.

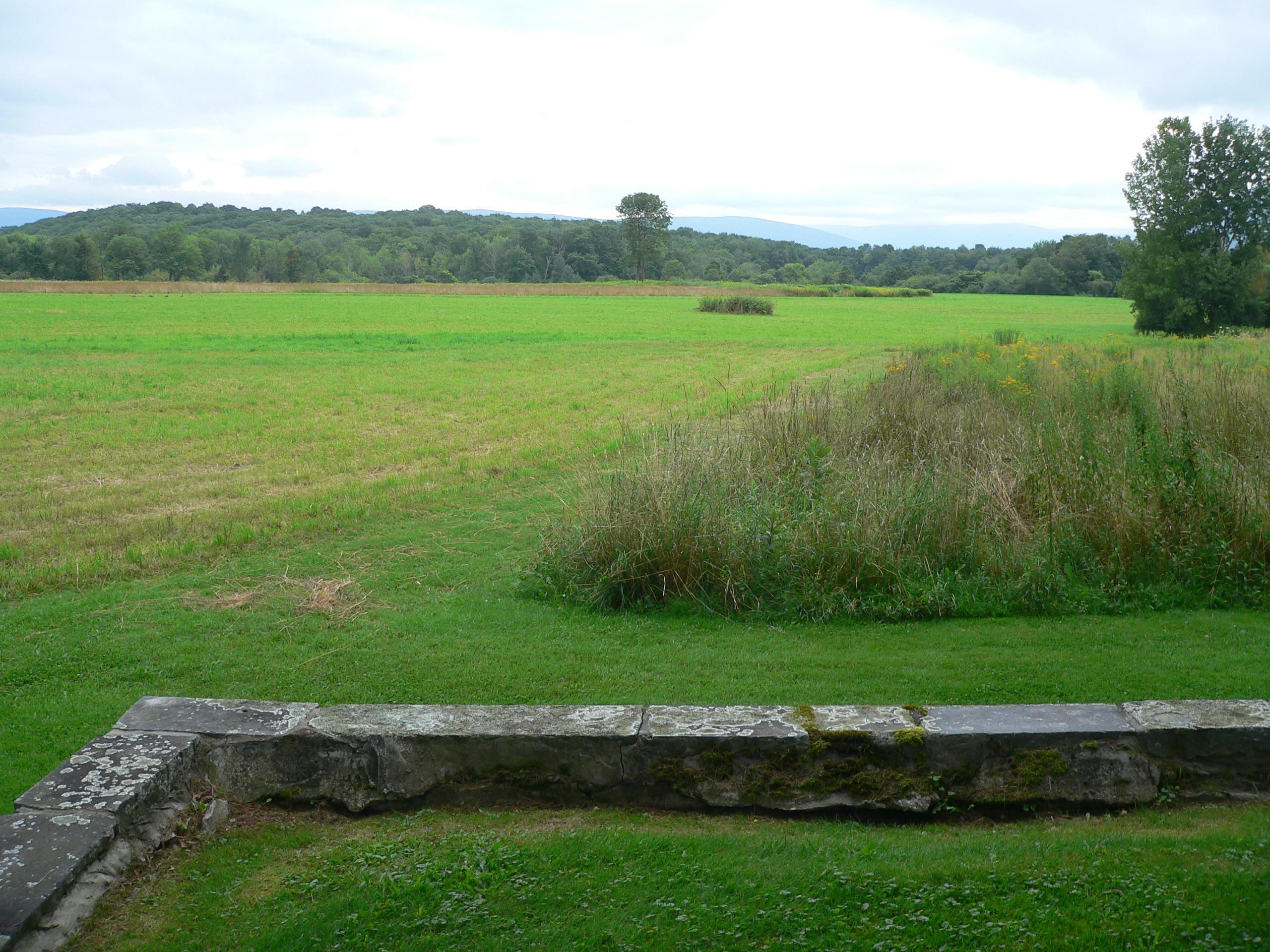
Wall and field
