= J. J. Donovan House =

- U.S. National Register of Historic Places
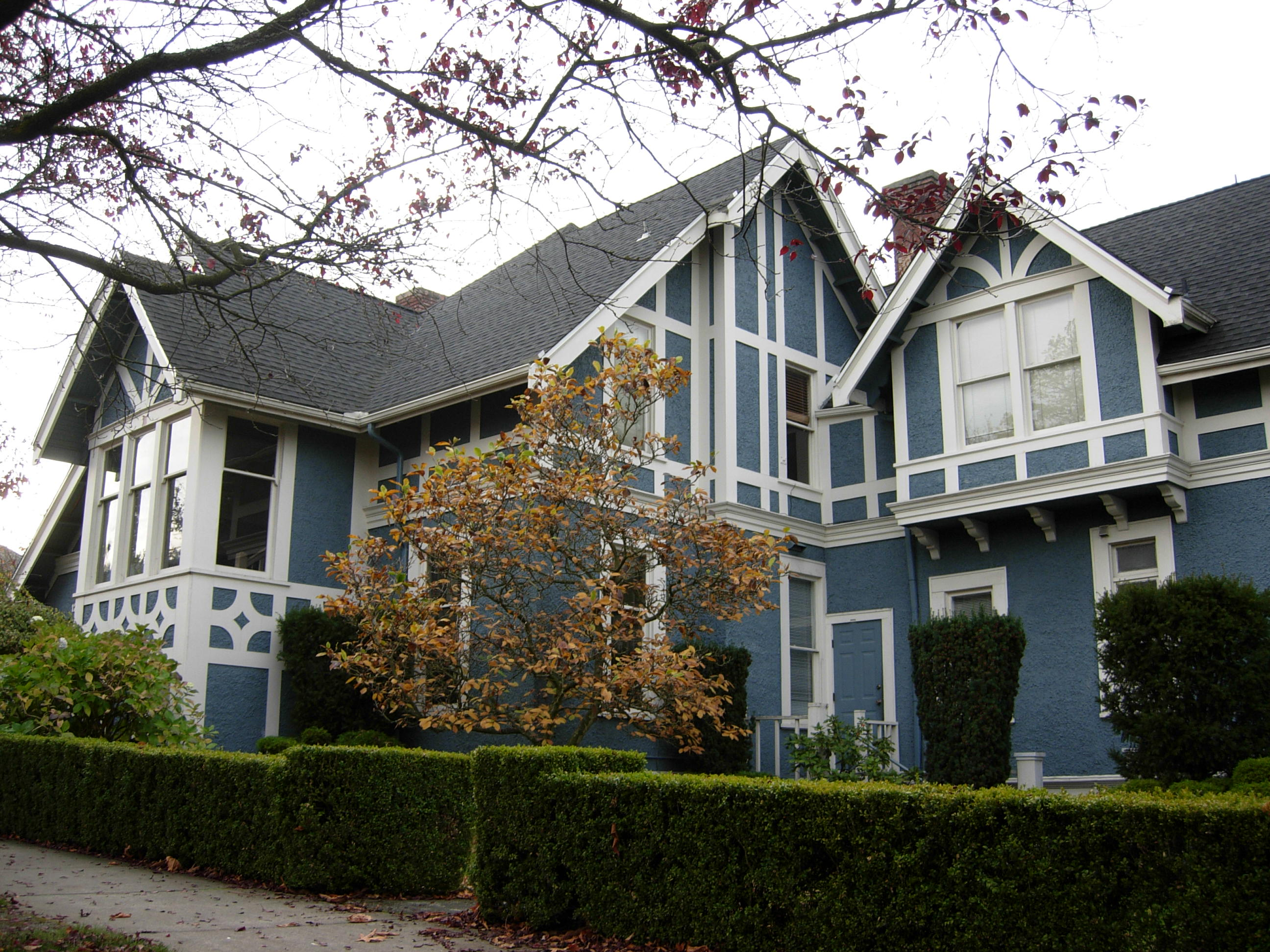

- Location within Washington (state) Location within the United States
- Location: 1201 Garden St., Bellingham, Washington
- Coordinates: 48°44′47″N 122°28′31″W
- Area: less than one acre
- Built: 1890
- Architectural style: Stick/Eastlake, Tudor Revival
- NRHP reference No.: 83003356
- Added to NRHP: January 27, 1983

The J. J. Donovan House, also known as Donovan House, at 1201 Garden Street in Bellingham, Washington is a two-and-a-half-story historic house that is listed on the National Register of Historic Places.

It was built in 1890 for Edward Fischer and was finished with fine details by its second owner, industrialist John Joseph Donovan. Its architecture is Stick style with Tudor Revival details plus other elements from other Victorian era architectural styles.

Early in his career J. J. Donovan worked for the Northern Pacific Railroad as a construction engineer. Later he was a significant player in the lumber industry.

It was used as a women's dormitory by Western Washington University for roughly 25 years.

== See also ==
- J. J. Donovan
