= Sehome, Bellingham, Washington =

Sehome
- Neighborhood
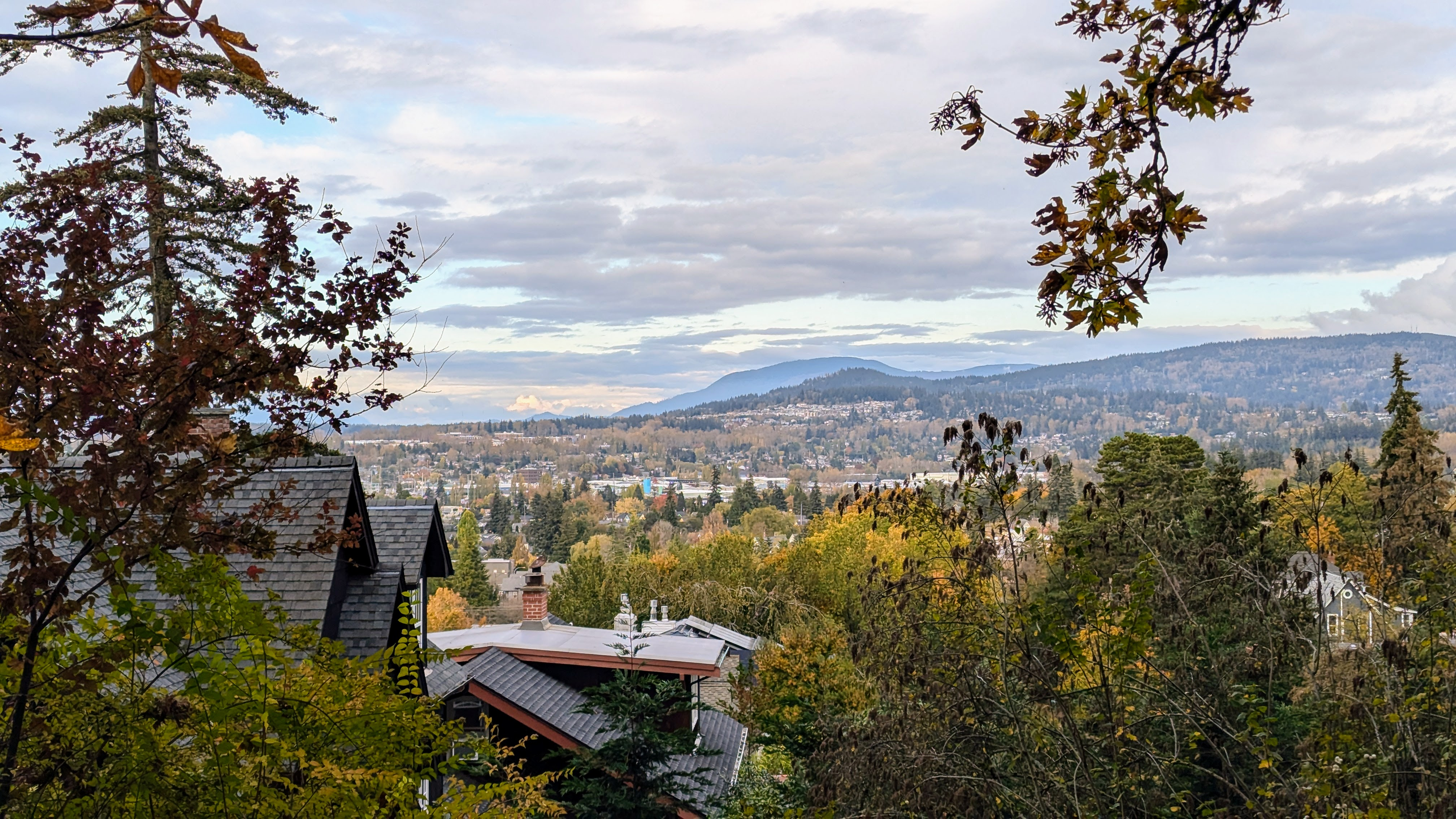
- View of Sehome from Sehome Hill
- Interactive map of Sehome
- Coordinates: 48°44′24″N 122°28′31″W
- Country: United States
- State: Washington
- County: Whatcom
- City: Bellingham
- Platted: 1854
- Incorporated: 1888
- Amalgamated: 1891
- ZIP code: 98225
- Sehome Hill Historic District
- U.S. National Register of Historic Places
- U.S. Historic district
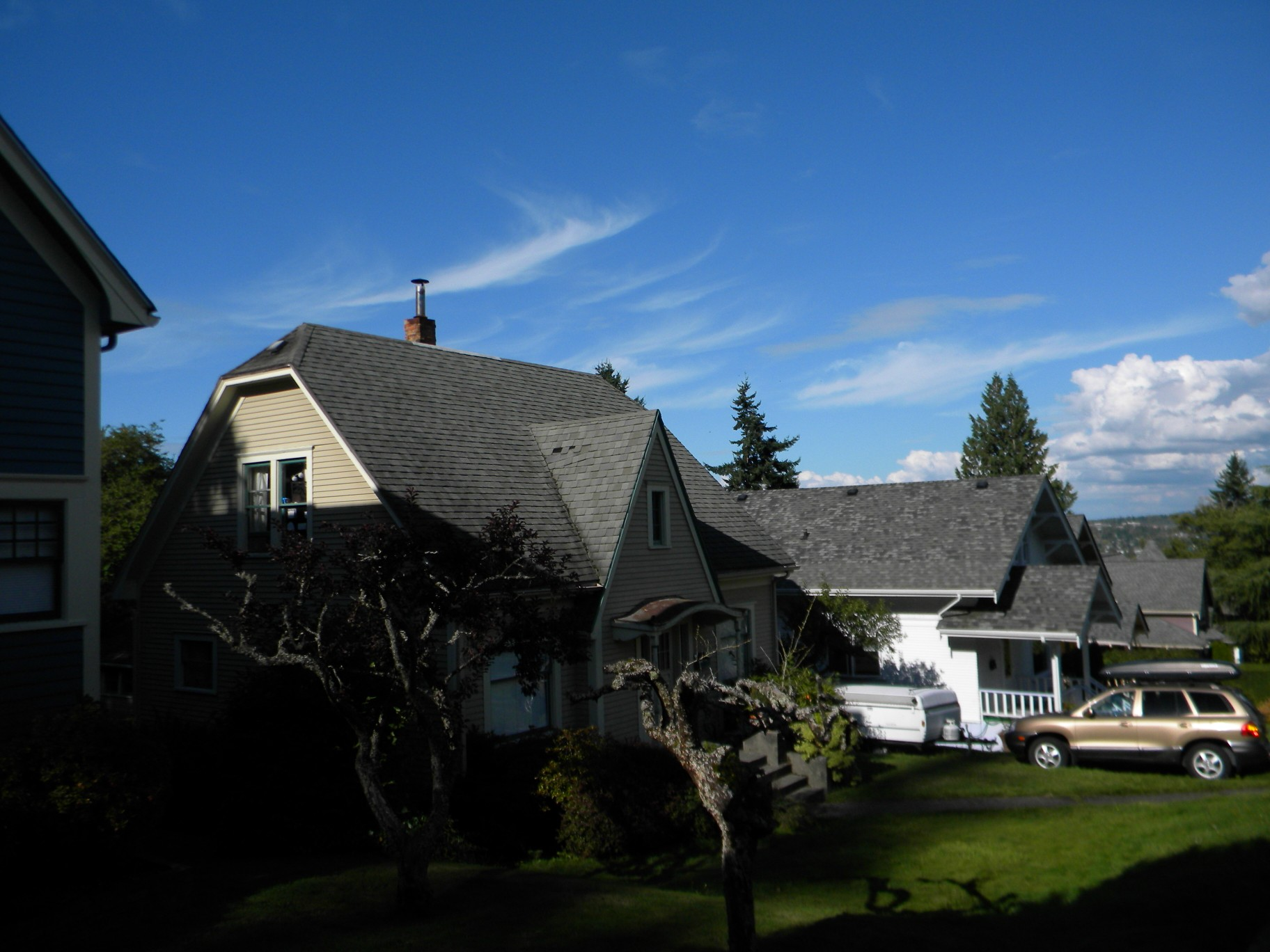
- Homes in the historic district
- Location: Bellingham, Washington, U.S.
- Built: 1875–1949
- Architectural style: American Craftsman, Late Victorian
- NRHP reference No.: 01000063
- Added to NRHP: February 13, 2001

Sehome is a neighborhood in Bellingham, Washington, United States. It was the first town on Bellingham Bay and was founded in May 1858 by coal mine manager Edmund C. Fitzhugh, who named the settlement for his father-in-law, S'Klallam chief Sehome. The townsite was originally owned by the Bellingham Bay and British Columbia Railroad, which operated the Bellingham Bay Coal Mine until it closed in 1878. The town of Sehome was amalgamated in 1891 with three other settlements into New Whatcom, which was later renamed to Bellingham.

The neighborhood now constitutes the southern part of downtown Bellingham and nearby residential areas that were developed in the early 20th century. It includes the Sehome Hill Arboretum and is adjacent to the Western Washington University campus, which lies to the southwest of the neighborhood. The Sehome Hill Historic District was added to the National Register of Historic Places in 2001.

== History ==
The area around Bellingham Bay is the ancestral home of several Coast Salish peoples, including the Lummi, Nooksack, Nuwhaha, and Samish. The first non-native settlers in the area were Henry Roeder and Russell Peabody, who built a lumber mill on Whatcom Creek and staked land claims around the stream in 1852. Roeder's claim was south of the creek in modern-day Sehome, where two of his employees discovered coal in the roots of a fallen tree while logging. Roeder sold his land to the Bellingham Bay Coal Company, which amassed 3,000 acres (1,200 ha) for a coal mine that would fill loaded ships bound for California from a new dock on Bellingham Bay.

The town of Sehome was platted in May 1858 by Edmund C. Fitzhugh, the manager of the coal mine, and was the first town on Bellingham Bay. It was named for S'Klallam chief Sehome (Klallam: sx̣ʷiʔám̕), Fitzhugh's father-in-law. The coal mine's growth was briefly stymied after new regulations from the Colony of British Columbia required coal mines to obtain permits from the colonial government in Victoria. Sehome grew from 80 residents in 1860 to 258 in 1870; three years later, the mine employed 100 white and Chinese men. The Bellingham Bay Coal Mine closed in 1878 as the quality of coal declined despite the excavation of deeper tunnels to find higher-quality veins.

The town relied on trade through its deep-water dock after the closure of the coal mine. Sehome was cleared of its forests and permanent buildings were constructed in the 1880s following the activation of an electrical power plant by the Bellingham Bay Improvement Company (successor to the coal mine). Sehome was incorporated in 1888 and amalgamated into the town of New Whatcom in 1891 alongside neighboring Whatcom. The settlement was later renamed Whatcom in 1910 and Bellingham in 1903 after it had absorbed two more towns. In 1893, the Washington state government chose a site south of Sehome for the New Whatcom Normal School, a teacher's school that later expanded to become Western Washington University.

The Sehome neighborhood had several streetcar lines that connected to other areas of Bellingham until the system was replaced by buses in 1938. The lines spurred the development of streetcar suburbs, including in Sehome, and created demand for residential areas throughout the former town. The east side of the neighborhood was developed in the 1930s following the completion of Maple Valley Road (now Samish Way), which was later designated as part of U.S. Route 99—the main north–south highway in Western Washington. The highway was bypassed by the construction of Interstate 5, which was completed around Bellingham in 1960. The city's first suburban shopping center, named Bellingham Mall, was opened in 1969 next to the freeway's interchange with Samish Way in southeastern Sehome. It was later eclipsed in importance by Bellis Fair and renamed to Sehome Village after it was rebuilt in 1991.

The Sehome Hill Historic District was added to the National Register of Historic Places on February 13, 2001, following a three-year campaign by local residents to recognize the neighborhood's historic residential architecture. The designation includes more than 200 eligible properties, mostly built before 1930, on nine streets.

== Geography ==
The neighborhood lies between Downtown Bellingham to the north and the Western Washington University campus to the south. It includes the northern side of Sehome Hill, which rises 640 feet (200 m) above sea level and also encompasses the Sehome Hill Arboretum. Most of the neighborhood's streets are arranged in the same grid as Downtown Bellingham with north–south streets named in alphabetical order ascending from the waterfront. The street blocks were designed to have 16 lots and an alleyway. The city government's official boundaries for Sehome are defined by N. State Street to the northwest, E. Holly Street and Ellis Street to the northeast, N. Samish Way to the east, Bill McDonald Parkway and the Western Washington University campus to the south, and Cedar and Garden streets to the southwest.

== Demographics ==
Most of Sehome lies within Whatcom County Census Tract 10, which also includes the Western Washington University campus. As of the 2020 census, the tract had a total population of 8,065 people—an increase of 13 percent from the 2010 census. The racial makeup of the tract was 77.1% White, 2.3% Black, 0.6% Native American, 5.3% Asian, 0.3% Pacific Islander, and 2.9% from other races; 11.4% of people identified with two or more races. Hispanic or Latino residents of any race were 8.6% of the population.

== Government ==
The neighborhood is split between two Bellingham City Council wards that each elect a councilmember: Ward 3, which includes Downtown Bellingham and neighborhoods to the east; and Ward 5, which includes Western Washington University. Sehome is represented by a member of the Whatcom County Council elected from District 1, which includes Downtown Bellingham, Fairhaven, and the city's southern neighborhoods.

Sehome is served by Fire Station 3 of the Bellingham Fire Department, which was completed in 1984 and renovated in 1998.

== Parks and recreation ==
The Sehome Hill Arboretum is a 175-acre (71 ha) public park and nature preserve that encompasses the southern half of the Sehome neighborhood and includes most of Sehome Hill. It was established in the early 20th century and opened in 1974 following an agreement between the Bellingham city government and Western Washington University to delegate maintenance and development to a volunteer organization. The arboretum includes Douglas fir and western hemlock groves, other deciduous trees, and walking trails. It is also home to 92 species of birds and over 16 species of mammals, including deer and coyotes.

Sehome has two neighborhood parks: Laurel Park and Forest & Cedar Park. They are both 2 acres (0.81 ha) and include playgrounds, lawns, and basketball courts. Laurel Park opened in 1984 on the site of the former Sehome Grade School, which was constructed in 1890 and demolished in 1958 after it had been abandoned for 18 years. The park was leased to Western Washington University but was not developed by the city government until the late 1990s. The neighborhood also has one off-street trail, the Crooked Path, and is near other parks in adjacent areas.

== Education ==
The Bellingham School District provides public education to the entire city, including Sehome. As of 2023, the neighborhood is split between the zones for Lowell Elementary and Happy Valley Elementary; it is fully within the zone for Fairhaven Middle School and Sehome High School. The high school was opened on September 10, 1967, to relieve crowding at Bellingham High School. Western Washington University, a four-year post-secondary institution, lies to the southwest of the Sehome neighborhood and has an enrollment of 16,000 students, of which 4,000 live on-campus.

== Infrastructure ==
=== Healthcare ===
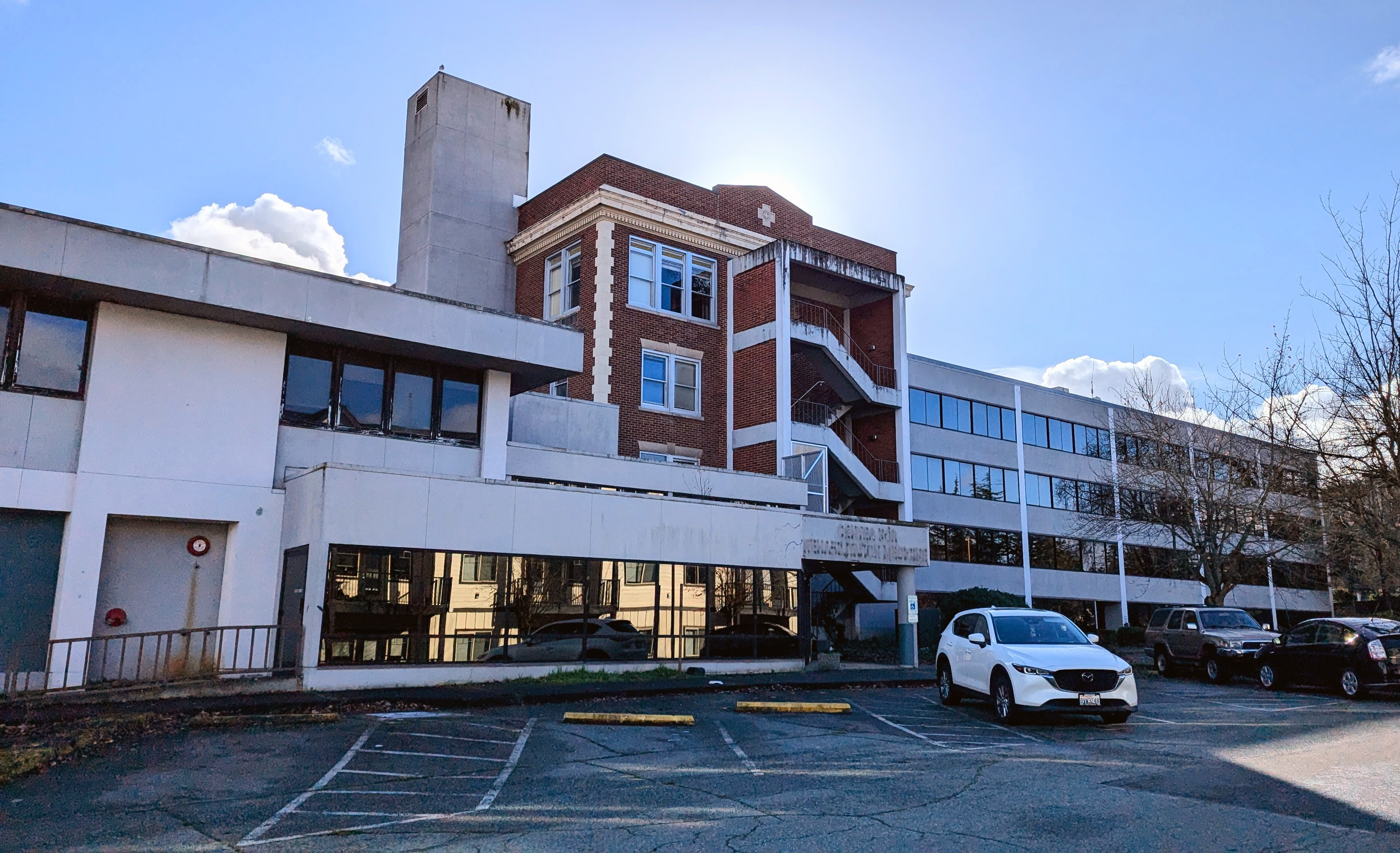
The St. Luke's Hospital campus in Sehome, later acquired by PeaceHealth

St. Luke's Hospital was established in 1892 by St. Paul's Episcopal Church at the former Grand Central Hotel, which had 20 beds. It quickly outgrew the building and moved across Sehome to a new, purpose-built hospital in January 1895. St. Luke's moved into a larger building in 1927 and expanded their campus through several renovation and improvement programs during the 20th century; it also became the sole designated trauma center for Whatcom County. A 1985 plan to build a helicopter pad for the hospital was rejected following objections from Sehome residents; a helicopter landing area was instead built at the Civic Athletic Complex. St. Luke's was acquired in 1989 by their former crosstown rival, St. Joseph Hospital, and was renamed to the South Campus. St. Joseph was later acquired by PeaceHealth, who moved most of their facilities away from the South Campus in the late 2010s.

=== Transportation ===
Sehome has several arterial streets that connect to other neighborhoods, as well as residential streets with little traffic. The busiest street is N. Samish Way, which had daily average volumes of 11,800 vehicles through the neighborhood in 2023. It connects to an interchange with Interstate 5 at the southeast corner of the neighborhood near the Sehome Village shopping center. Sehome also has several streets with marked bicycle lanes and secondary passageways, such as alleys, that are designated for pedestrian and bicycle traffic.

The Whatcom Transportation Authority runs several bus routes through Sehome that connect to Downtown Bellingham and the Western Washington University campus.
