= Franklin River (Vancouver Island) =

River on Vancouver Island in British Columbia, Canada

Coordinates: 49°6′9″N 124°48′59″W

Franklin River in Vancouver Island, British Columbia, is located between Alberni Inlet and Barkley Sound, was named as part of the Vancouver Island Exploration Expedition of 1864. The river was named for Selim Franklin, Esquire, who was Chairman of the Exploration Committee.

The Franklin River flows west into Sproat Narrows in the Alberni Inlet, south of the city of Port Alberni.

In 1911 Seattle attorney Julius Bloedel and the Bloedel Stewart Welch Company began purchasing Vancouver Island land for logging. Their Franklin River location became one of the largest logging operations in the world. Later in 1938 the company would become the first in British Columbia to plant seedlings in areas that had been logged.

The Franklin River is in the traditional territory of the Hupačasath First Nation, part of the Nuu-chah-nulth people. The Hupačasath name for the Franklin River is ʔa-waa-čis, also spelled Hy-wach-is. According to the BC Geographical Names database, "Owatchet" is another traditional name, although the database does not provide any additional information on the origin or use of this name.

== See also ==
- List of rivers of British Columbia
