= Dirty Dan Harris =

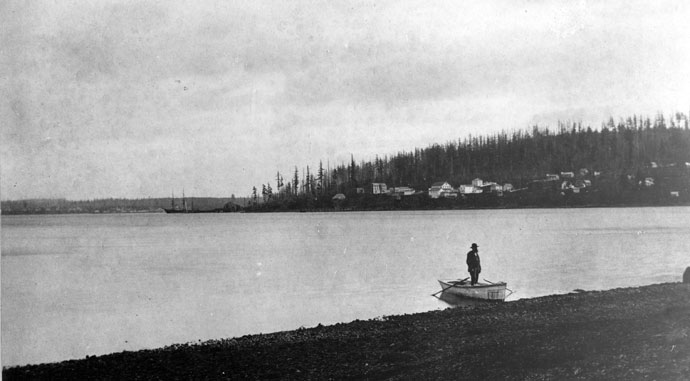
Dan Harris in 1884

Daniel Jefferson "Dirty Dan" Harris (c. 1833 – August 18, 1890) was an early settler of the Bellingham Bay area and founder of the town of Fairhaven, Washington. Following a stint as a whaler in the Pacific Ocean, Harris arrived in Washington Territory in either 1853 or 1854. After years of trading and buying land surrounding his original homestead, he platted the property into the town of Fairhaven in 1883 and began selling plots for gold. By 1889, Harris sold off his remaining land to Nelson Bennett and C. X. Larrabee for US$75,000. Bennett and Larrabee continued to develop Fairhaven until its incorporation with other Bellingham Bay towns into the city of Bellingham in 1903. Harris retired to Los Angeles where he died in 1890. Residents of Bellingham today celebrate an annual festival in Harris's honor where visitors can learn about the early history of the city.

== Early life ==
Much of Harris's early life is unclear. He was born on Long Island in New York, with Southampton, Patchogue, Sag Harbor, and Bridgehampton cited by various sources as his birthplace. On the other hand, an obituary in the Los Angeles Times gave his birthplace as Maine. Sources also differ on when exactly Harris was born, with dates ranging from 1826 to 1833.
