= Sehome Hill Arboretum =

Park in Bellingham, Washington, USA

Coordinates: 48°44′00″N 122°28′48″W

- Interactive map of Sehome Hill Arboretum
- Location: Bellingham, Washington
- Area: 175.5 acres (71.0 ha)

The Sehome Hill Arboretum is a public park in the Sehome neighborhood of Bellingham, Washington. It comprises 175.5 acres (71.0 ha) of second growth forest on Sehome Hill, adjacent to the campus of Western Washington University. Though called an arboretum, the hilly expanse atop Sehome Hill is not consciously planted as an exhibit of tree species, but naturally wooded and rich in the plant species (both native and nonnative) typical of the region.

The arboretum is jointly managed by both the university and the city. Its care is overseen by the Sehome Hill Arboretum Board of Governors, composed of city employees, university employees, university students, and city residents. The park offers students and city dwellers over 5 miles (8 km) of public trails for walking and running and, in some areas, bicycling. Unique features of the park include an 80-foot (24 m) wooden observation tower atop Sehome Hill, with aerial views of Bellingham Bay to the south. There is also a large tunnel, hand cut into rock in 1923, originally used for car traffic in the early 1900s. Its tall, thin shape shows its creation for cars like Model T Fords of the day. Cars are no longer allowed in the tunnel and it is part of a trail along which hikers can walk.

== History ==
In the 1850s, coal-mining claims were made on Sehome Hill and two coal scouts named Henry Hewitt and William Brown who were working for Henry Roeder's lumber mill found coal. The Bellingham Bay Coal Company was founded and began work in 1855. Tunnels are said to be laced through Sehome Arboretum but their exact locations and the tunnel's entrances are no longer known. Logging has taken place in the arboretum since the 1800s with operations ongoing as recently as 1906. The land became a park c. 1922 and an arboretum in 1974, with the closure of most of the park to automobiles.

== Native plants ==
The Arboretum contains the following plant species:

Trees

- Douglas Fir
- Western Hemlock
- Western Redcedar
- Alder
- Bigleaf Maple
- Vine Maple

Shrubs

- Oregon-grape
- Indian Plum
- Snowberry
- Oceanspray
- Salal
- Blue Elderberry
- Red Elderberry
- Red Huckleberry
- Saskatoon
- Thimbleberry

== Invasive plants ==
A number of invasive plants grow inside the arboretum, including:

- English Ivy
- Vinca sp.
- Variegated Yellow Archangel

== See also ==
- List of botanical gardens in the United States
