= Bellingham National Bank Building =

Coordinates: 48°44′59″N 122°28′43″W

- U.S. National Register of Historic Places
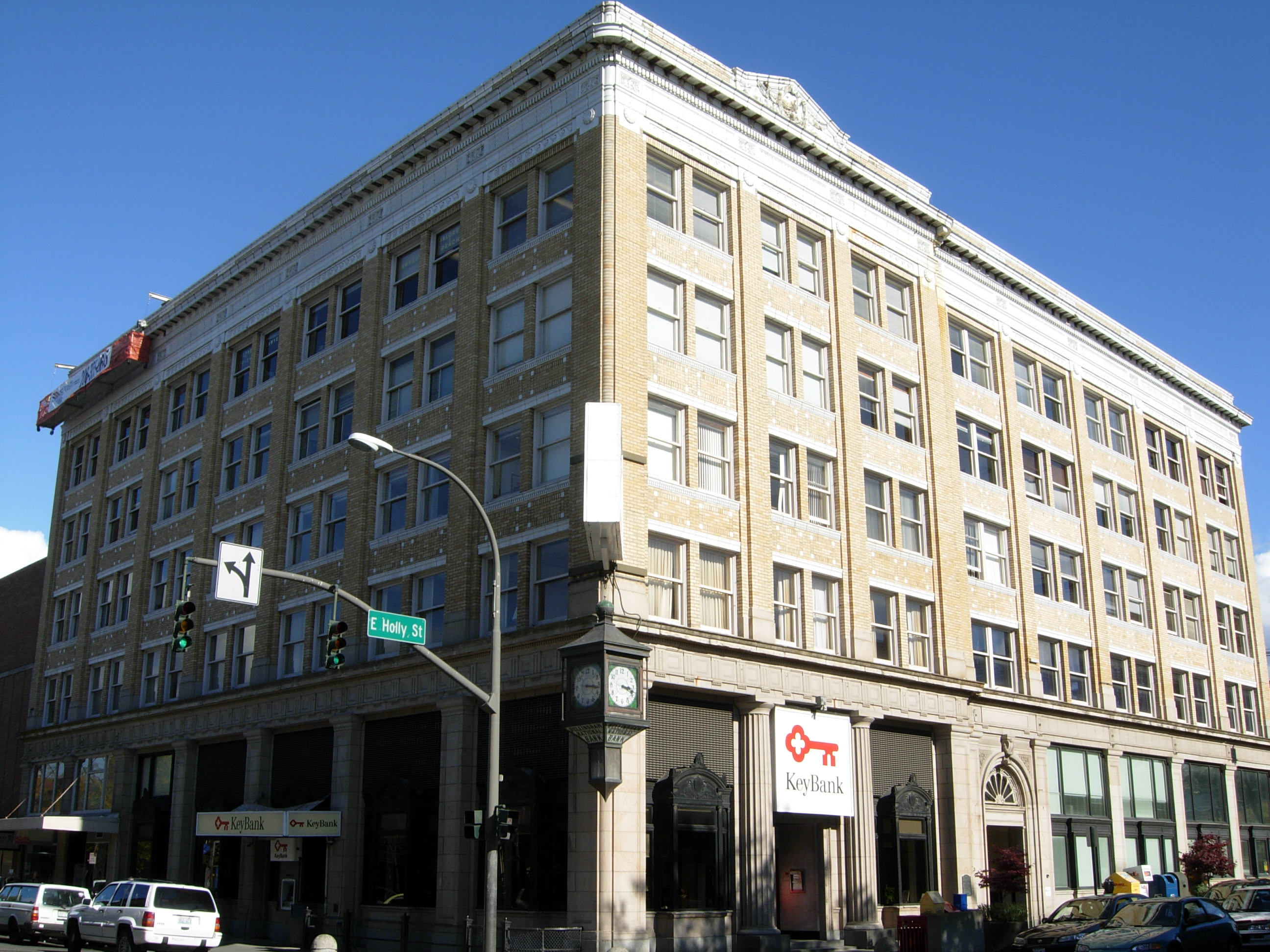
- Location: 101-111 East Holly Bellingham, Washington
- Built: 1912-1913
- Architect: F. Stanley Piper, John Graham
- Architectural style: Beaux Arts
- NRHP reference No.: 83004275

The Bellingham National Bank Building is an historic commercial/office building located in downtown Bellingham, Washington. It was originally built from 1912 to 1913 in a restrained Beaux Arts commercial style with reinforced concrete. Even though this particular style was common for cities in the midwest and east coast, the building style was a stark contrast for Bellingham's sandstone and rounded arch buildings. The Bellingham National Bank occupied the building starting on December 1, 1913.

Key Bank of Washington occupied the first floor until May 8, 2009.
Starting in February 2011, The Stamp & Coin Place, a local bullion and coin trading shop, will occupy the space. The upper-offices are leased to various businesses and government offices, including the Washington State Board of Industrial Insurance Appeals and the Washington State Attorney General's Office.

== History ==
=== The bank ===
The Bellingham National Bank was formed in 1904 by a group of local capitalists led by Victor Roeder. It opened for business on January 3, 1905, in the corner store-room of the Clover Block on the corner of Holly and Commercial Streets. The small bank soon grew to become one of the most prominent banks in Bellingham and began searching for larger quarters by the end of the decade.

In March 1912, the bank purchased the Southeast corner of Dock and Holly Streets for $175,000. The site was occupied by several wooden buildings dating to the late 19th century including the Beck Hotel, built on the corner in 1888 by David Beck who would later build the adjoining theater. The parameters of the property were described in the local paper:

The property involved in the deal extends from Dock Street to the alley between Dock Street and Railroad Avenue, a distance of 125 feet, and is 110 feet deep.

The bank announced their plans to build a $200,000, 6 story brick and concrete building on the lot that would be one of the finest in the Northwest. The bank would occupy the ground floor corner of the building, a frontage of about 50 feet on Holly, while the rest of the building would contain offices above and retail stores on the ground floor. Demolition and then construction would begin by June of the same year.

=== Design and construction ===
The bank hired Bellingham architect F. Stanley Piper to design the building who in turn hired C.H. Beattie of Seattle as the general contractor. Work began at a quick pace and by February 1913, the concrete structure of the building was complete with laying of the brick facing about to begin. Each of the building's 124 rooms was to be equipped with hot and cold running water as well as access to the building's vacuum system. Other modern features would include two high-speed elevators and a mail chute.

The first two stories were clad with Wilkeson sandstone, with the upper four clad in light buff-colored pressed brick. From the top of the fourth-floor windows to the parapet line was clad with terra cotta.

The interior corridors featured terrazzo floors with panels and borders of Alaskan marble. The vestibule was adorned with an 11 foot high marble dado of Colorado Yeul while the columns in the vestibule were of genuine Italian Pavonazzo marble. Materials used in the banking room included Alaskan and Kasota marble, Honduran mahogany, and Calamine brass for doors.

By August 1913, the building was complete and tenants began to move including doctors, dentists and other professionals. The bank officially opened on December 1, 1913.
