= MacMillan Bloedel =

Canadian forestry company (1951–1999)

MacMillan Bloedel Limited
- Industry: Forestry; Pulp and paper
- Founded: 30 October 1951
- Defunct: 1 November 1999
- Fate: Acquired by Weyerhaeuser
- Headquarters: MacMillan Bloedel Building, Vancouver, British Columbia

MacMillan Bloedel Limited was a Canadian forestry company headquartered in Vancouver, British Columbia. The company was formed in 1951 as MacMillan and Bloedel through the merger of Bloedel, Stewart and Welch with the H. R. MacMillan Export Company. MacMillan and Bloedel then merged in 1959 with the Powell River Company to form MacMillan, Bloedel and Powell River, before adopting its final name in 1966. It was acquired by Weyerhaeuser in 1999.

== Predecessor companies ==
=== Powell River Company ===
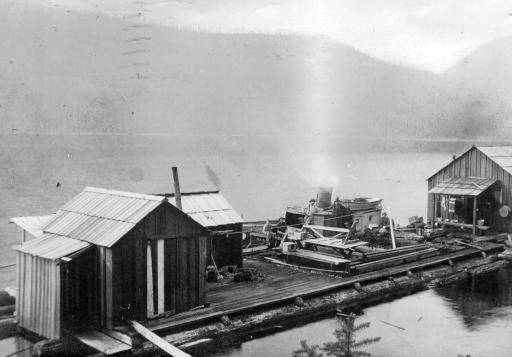
Early hand logging family on Powell River

In 1908 two American entrepreneurs, Dr. Dwight Brooks and Michael Scanlon, created a newsprint mill at Powell River, northwest of Vancouver. The Powell River Company turned out the first roll of newsprint manufactured in British Columbia in 1912. It soon became one of the world's largest newsprint plants and today is credited with introducing the first self-dumping log barge to British Columbia.

=== Bloedel, Stewart and Welch ===
In 1911 Julius Bloedel, a Seattle lawyer, along with his two partners, John Stewart and Patrick Welch, began acquiring large blocks of Vancouver Island forests. Their Franklin River camp soon became one of the world's largest logging operations. Here, in the 1930s, the Canadian industry saw its first Lidgerwood steel spar yarder and chainsaw. In 1938, Bloedel, Stewart and Welch became the first logging company in the province to plant seedlings in a logged-over area. Bloedel, Stewart and Welch opened a large timber mill in Port Alberni. The company had large camps near Menzies Bay, British Columbia, Comox and Myrtle Point, just south of Powell River. The company was headquartered in Vancouver. Stewart and Welch were also partners in Foley, Welch and Stewart, who were prominent in railway-building operations in the same period.

=== H. R. MacMillan Export Company ===
The last of the three pre-merger companies was the H.R. MacMillan Export Company, which was created in 1919 by Harvey, or H.R. MacMillan, British Columbia's first Chief Forester. MacMillan reportedly gained considerable experience in world lumbering during World War I. With his colleague Whitford Julian VanDusen, another forester, MacMillan incorporated a company in 1919 to sell British Columbia lumber products to foreign markets. In 1924, they established a shipping company that would become one of the world's biggest charter companies. With the creation of Seaboard Lumber by the other mill owners in British Columbia, there was a major threat to MacMillan, as Seaboard was to export all the lumber from the companies that founded it leaving MacMillan without the lumber needed to fulfill their orders. MacMillan responded by beginning to purchase mills and creating the first truly integrated forestry company in British Columbia.

During World War II, MacMillan acquired numerous small mills and timber tenures on the south coast of British Columbia.

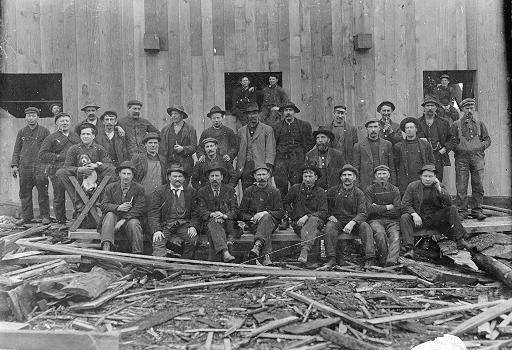
Workers at Barclay Sound Cedar Company, later Alberni Pacific Lumber

== History of MacMillan Bloedel ==
=== MacMillan and Bloedel Limited, 1951–1959 ===
In 1951 Bloedel, Stewart and Welch merged with H.R. MacMillan to form MacMillan Bloedel Limited. The two companies had timber holdings side-by-side and there was a natural synergy from this merger. Bloedel, Stewart and Welch held many timber resources and MacMillan was the first truly integrated forestry company in British Columbia. The merger in 1951 created a company that would be able to compete on the global scene.

=== MacMillan, Bloedel and Powell River Limited, 1959–1966 ===
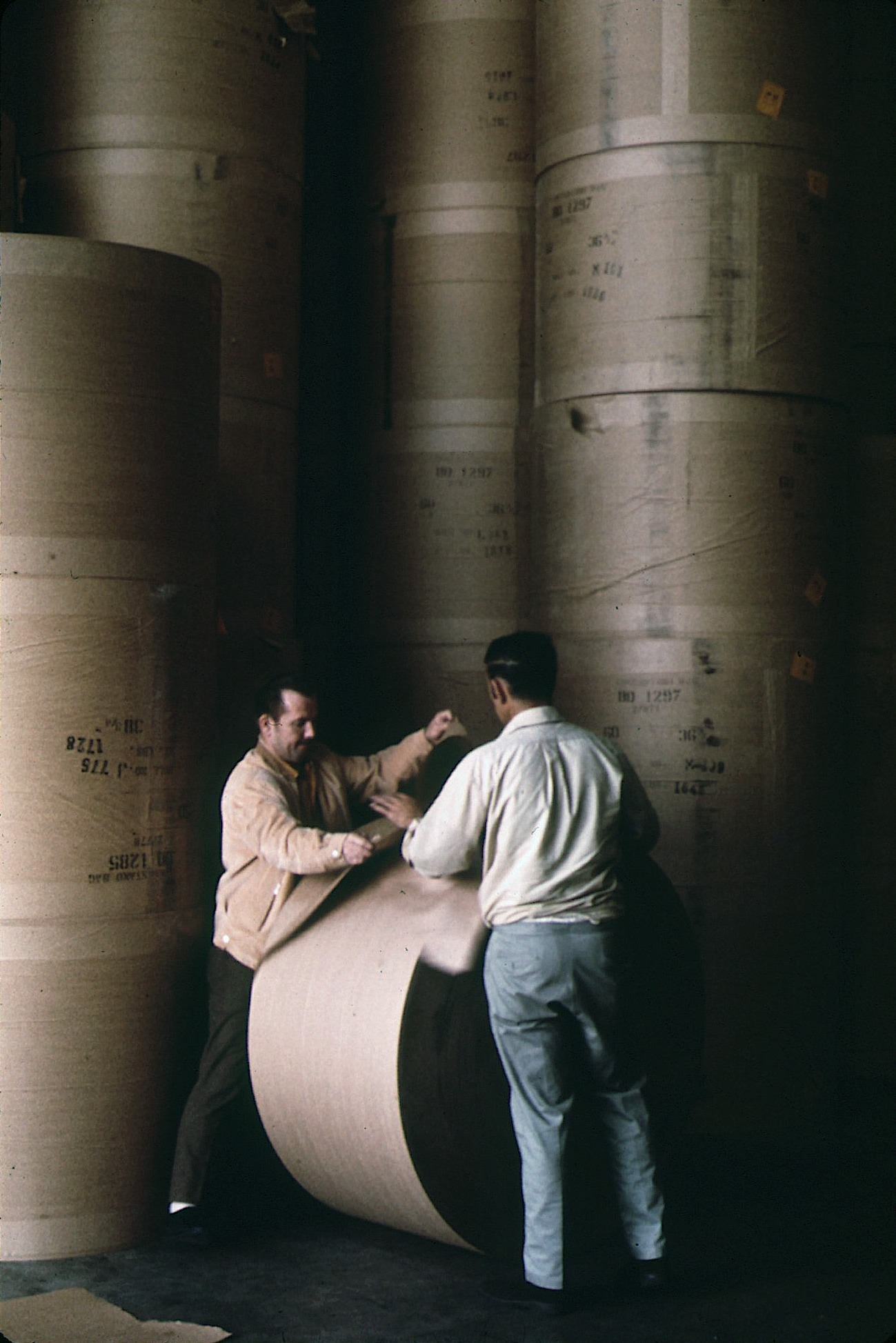
Rolls of finished newsprint at a MacMillan Bloedel plant in British Columbia in 1970.

On 31 December 1959, MacMillan and Bloedel completed its merger with the Powell River Company. The merger was carried out via a stock swap, whereby MacMillan and Bloedel shares were exchanged for shares in Powell River. On 4 January 1960, the name of the Powell River Company Limited was changed to MacMillan, Bloedel and Powell River Limited.

Beginning in the 1960s, MacMillan Bloedel expanded across North America as well as to Europe and the United Kingdom. At its peak, acquisitions and construction activities gave MacMillan Bloedel worldwide assets of more than C$4 billion.

=== MacMillan Bloedel Limited, 1966–1999 ===
At the company's annual meeting in 1966, shareholders voted to shorten its name to MacMillan Bloedel Limited. Along with the name change, in 1967 the company commissioned a new logo designed by Lester Beall (1903–1969).

The Brutalist MacMillan Bloedel Building located at Thurlow and Georgia Street in downtown Vancouver was a highlight of the early architectural career of Arthur Erickson, who advocated the use of concrete as "the new marble" and employed it in the building's stark design, which is often compared locally to a concrete waffle. The building, completed in 1969, won the Massey Medal in 1970.

In 1993, the MacMillan Bloedel company composed an agenda of expanding its logging into new areas and refused to abandon its plans to clearcut a significant portion of the temperate rain forest around Clayoquot Sound on the west coast of Vancouver Island, in spite of opposition from several organizations. Environmentalists, together with private land owners and indigenous groups, launched the Clayoquot protests after discovering that MacMillan Bloedel was logging in one of the most pristine areas around Clayoquot Sound — a clear violation of the recommendations made by top government-chosen scientists. This logging, however, was approved by the Ministry of Forests and was within the Tree Farm License (TFL) granted for that area to MacMillan Bloedel by the provincial government. The Science Panel for Sustainable Forest Practices in Clayoquot Sound was formed after 850 people were arrested for blockading MacMillan Bloedel's logging in Clayoquot in the summer of 1993. The Science Panel made stringent recommendations which MacMillan Bloedel promised to abide by, a commitment MacMillan Bloedel used to assure their international newsprint and phone directory paper customers that they should keep buying from the Canadian logging giant. MacMillan Bloedel made a commitment to phase out clearcutting and embrace the variable retention method of harvesting timber, but was occasionally accused of falling short of the commitment.

== Acquisition by Weyerhaeuser ==
In June 1999, Weyerhaeuser announced its intention to buy MacMillan Bloedel Limited of Canada for stock valued at about US$2.45 billion. The merger made Weyerhaeuser, which at that time was already the world's largest producer of softwood lumber and market pulp, a leader in packaging as well.

== Leadership ==
=== President ===
1. Maj-Gen Bertram Hoffmeister, 1951–1955
2. Harry S. Berryman, 1956
3. Ralph M. Shaw, 1957–1959
4. Milton J. Foley, 1959–1960
5. Ernest G. Shorter, 1961–1962
6. Charles A. Specht, 1963–1967
7. Robert W. Bonner, 1972
8. Denis W. Timmis, 1973–1975
9. C. Calvert Knudsen, 1976–1979
10. Raymond V. Smith, 1980–1990
11. Robert B. Findlay, 1990–1997
12. W. Thomas Stephens, 1997–1999

=== Chairman of the Board ===
1. H. R. MacMillan, 1951–1955
2. Maj-Gen Bertram Hoffmeister, 1956–1957
3. John Clyne, 1958–1972
4. Robert W. Bonner, 1973
5. George B. Currie, 1974–1975
6. J. Ernest Richardson, 1978–1979
7. C. Calvert Knudsen, 1980–1983
8. Adam H. Zimmerman, 1983–1990
9. Raymond V. Smith, 1990–1994
10. Richard F. Haskayne, 1994–1999
