= Nelson Bennett =

Canadian-American businessman

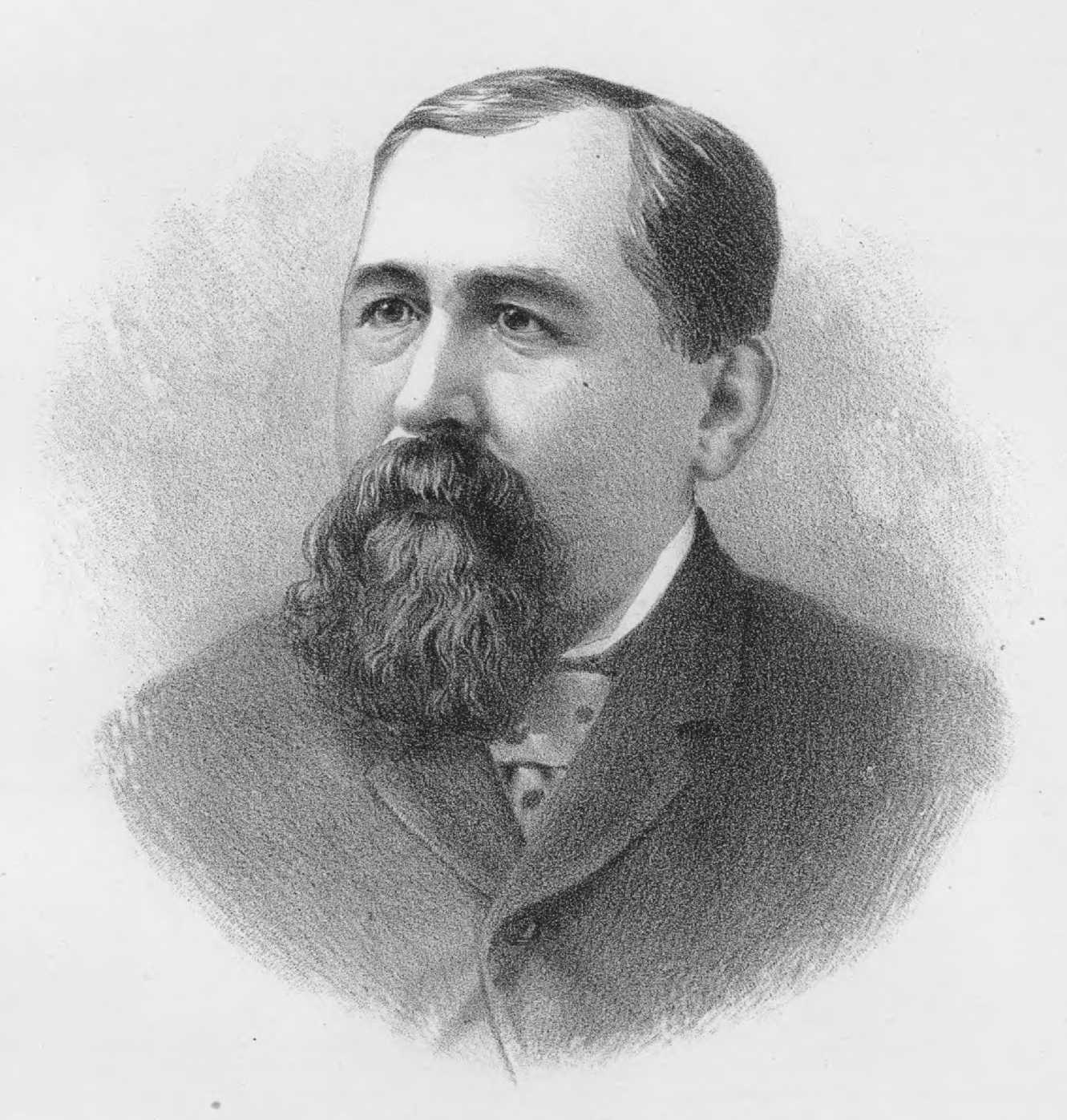
Nelson Bennett, circa 1889

Nelson Bennett (October 14, 1843 – July 20, 1913) was a Canadian-American railroad magnate who contributed to the growth of Fairhaven and Tacoma, Washington in the late 19th-century. Bennett was president of the Fairhaven and Southern Railroad, which first connected the Bellingham Bay region with the rest of the country.

== Early life ==
Bennett was born the third of six children to Nicholas Bennett and Diana Sprague on October 14, 1843 in the hamlet of Belhaven, Town of North Gwillumbury, York County, Province of Canada to a family of American Canadians; his father's family were New Netherland Dutch/Pennsylvania German Dunkard Simcoe Loyalists originally from Pennsylvania and later western New York and his mother's of English Puritan descent from Massachusetts and Rhode Island. He was a descendant of the Danish/Dutch Willem Adrianse Bennet (born 1604 in Helsingør, Denmark) who was the first European settler of Brooklyn, New York. His two older brothers, Sidney James and David Henry, preceded him in returning to the United States where both served in the Union Army during the Civil War. David Henry Bennett fell at Antietam on September 17, 1862 at the Dunkard Church.

Bennett left for Ridgeway, Orleans County, New York at 17 where he had paternal family members that had owned and operated at that time the largest salt boiling concern in the Holland Land Purchase and began a career in industry, first building barracks for the Army before moving to Pennsylvania in 1864, where he made a significant amount of money constructing oil wells. He was joined in this endeavor by one of his younger brothers, Willard Manville Bennett, who later would be a successful businessman in Butte, Montana and served as a two term Republican state senator in the Territory and then State of Montana.

== Pacific Northwest ==
By the 1880s, Bennett was fulfilling contracts for the American railroad industry, which included building the Stampede Tunnel through the Cascade Range in Washington Territory in 1886–1888. During this time, he invested heavily in Tacoma before focusing his attention on Fairhaven in 1889, with the hopes of developing the small town into a major port to rival Seattle and Tacoma.

Bennett, along with a number of business partners, including Charles Larrabee, founded the Fairhaven Land Company in November 1888. The following year, the company acquired a large amount of property in Fairhaven from Daniel J. Harris, who had originally platted the town. Bennett intended to turn the town of Fairhaven into an international port and western terminus of the Great Northern Railway and so set about developing coal mines and building rail lines through the area. The Fairhaven and Southern laid track north to British Columbia and southeast to what is now Sedro-Woolley, as well as to numerous mines in the area. While they succeeded in linking the region to the Great Northern, Seattle became the railway's western terminus in 1891 and Fairhaven never developed as much as Bennett had hoped. The Fairhaven and Southern properties were eventually bought out by Great Northern under the control of James J. Hill around the turn of the 20th century.

By the end of 1890, with the boom years of Fairhaven fading, Bennett sold his interests in Fairhaven to Larrabee and returned to Tacoma. He died there on July 20, 1913.

== Personal life ==
Bennett married Lottie Huggins on September 2, 1881 in Dillon, Montana. The couple had five daughters; Sarah Sadie, Stella, Sheila ‘Ceta’, Nelsie, and Charlotte. Since no son resulted from the marriage, his youngest brother, George Albert Bennett, named his son after him. This nephew, Lt. Col. Nelson Bennett II, would serve in both World War I and II and is buried at Arlington National Cemetery. The name is still carried by his twice great nephew Nelson Bennett IV, a college professor residing in Bethesda, Maryland.
