= C. X. Larrabee =

American businessman

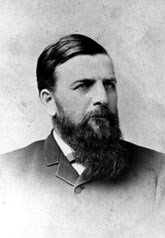
Charles Larrabee, circa 1890s

Charles Xavier Larrabee (November 19, 1843 – September 16, 1914) was an American businessman and a co-founder of the town of Fairhaven, Washington. Later in life, Larrabee and his wife Frances donated much land for civic purposes, including schools and parks, and were considered stewards of the city of Bellingham.

== Early life ==
Larrabee was born in 1843 to William and Mary Ann Larrabee in Portville, New York. He was six years old when the family moved to Omro, Wisconsin in 1849, where his father opened a general store. Once he was old enough, Larrabee traveled to Poughkeepsie, New York to take a course at a business college to add to his public education. Starting in 1869, Larrabee and his brother, Samuel E. Larabie (1845–1914), operated a bank in Deer Lodge, Montana.

== Business career ==
In 1875, Larrabee went to Montana, and in 1887, his efforts as a prospector were rewarded by the discovery of the valuable Mountain View near Butte. After selling this property to the Boston & Montana Company, he moved to Portland, Oregon. In 1890, he arrived in Bellingham, Washington and associated himself with Nelson Bennett, the founder of Tacoma, Washington.

Together they founded the town of Fairhaven and formed the Fairhaven Land Company, which was financed by Larrabee, who was also president of the company in 1896. Larrabee later purchased the land company holdings of his partner and retained control of the corporation until his death, doing work in land development, including building the Fairhaven Hotel, described by one reporter of the Fairhaven Herald as "million-dollar edifice".

Larrabee founded the Citizens Bank of Bellingham, and was that institution's first president. He was also a member of the firm of Larrabee Brothers, a group of private bankers in Deer Lodge, Montana. Larrabee organized the Roslyn-Cascade Coal Company of Roslyn, Washington and developed what was known as one of the finest coal mines in the state of Washington. Larrabee was one of the first area businessmen in the Pacific Northwest region to realize the possibilities of the salmon-fishing industry. He also owned a stock ranch known as Brook-Nook, near Dillon, Montana, where he raised trotting horses.

== Later life ==
On August 3, 1892, Larrabee married Frances Frazier Payne (January 15, 1867 – June 11, 1941), a daughter of Benjamin and Adelia Payne, residents of St. Louis, Missouri. The Larrabees had four children: Charles Francis; Edward Payne, who served as a lieutenant in World War I; Mary Adele; and Benjamin Howard.

In 1914, Larrabee hired Seattle architect Carl Gould to design a house in Bellingham and christened Larrabee Manor, now Lairmont Manor, upon its completion. Charles Larrabee died in September of that year before construction even began. The house was finished under the supervision of his wife, Frances, and is now on the United States National Register of Historic Places and maintained by a non-profit trusteeship.

== Legacy ==
In 1890, a Bellingham grammar school was named in Larrabee's honor. The school was closed down in 2014.

Soon after Larrabee's death, his family donated 20 acres (8.1 ha) of land to the state of Washington for the creation of a state park in Larrabee's name.

Charles and Frances Larrabee are interred at the Acacia Mausoleum near Seattle.
