= Fairhaven, Bellingham, Washington =

- Fairhaven Historic District
- U.S. National Register of Historic Places
- U.S. Historic district
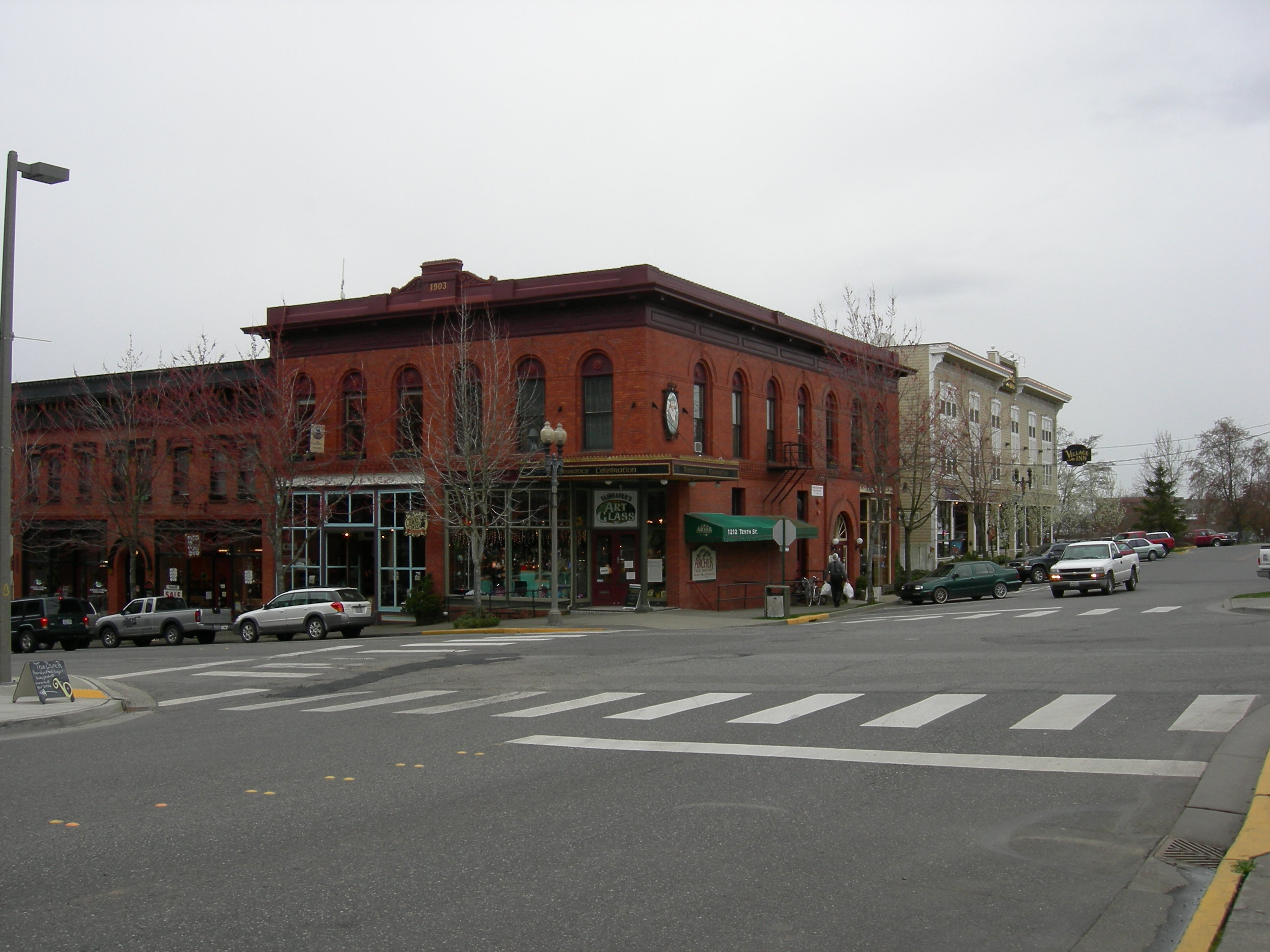
- Fairhaven, intersection of 10th and Harris, looking northwest
- Interactive map of Fairhaven Historic District
- Location: Roughly bounded by 10th and 13th Sts., Columbia and Larrabee Aves.
- Nearest city: Bellingham, Washington
- Coordinates: 48°43′05″N 122°30′25″W
- NRHP reference No.: 77001363
- Added to NRHP: August 19, 1977

Fairhaven (or Fairhaven Village) was a settlement in Washington state founded in 1883 by Dan Harris. In 1903, it became part of the city of Bellingham and remains a historic neighborhood.

== Description ==
The Fairhaven area is situated on the south side of Bellingham, and borders Bellingham Bay on the west and Western Washington University on the northeast.

Since 1989, Fairhaven has been the southernmost terminus of the Alaska Marine Highway System, Alaska's state run ferry system. The Bellingham Cruise Terminal is also the departure point for summer passenger ferry service to the San Juan Islands and Victoria, British Columbia, Canada operated by Victoria/San Juan Cruises. Nearby is Fairhaven Station, a small transportation hub which serves as Bellingham's Amtrak Cascades station stop as well as the Greyhound bus depot. Connections can be made to local taxis or local transit. Whatcom Transportation Authority recently upgraded Fairhaven's bus service to every 15 minutes as part of its Red Line. Fairhaven also plays outdoor movies every weekend during the summer at the Pickford Outdoor Cinema in Fairhaven's historical district.

=== Historical district ===
In the center of the Fairhaven area is the Fairhaven Historical District, which features a seasonal farmer's market as well as restaurants and shops. All newly constructed buildings are required to conform in outward appearance to the community's traditional 19th-century style as defined by the Bellingham Municipal Code.

== History ==
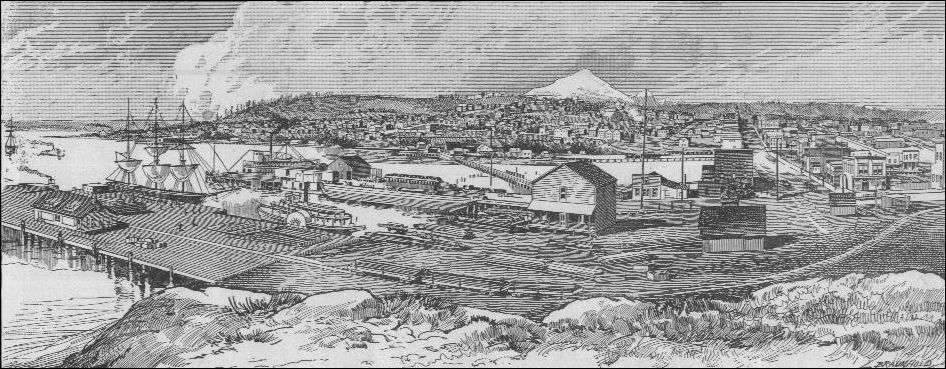
Fairhaven in 1890

Daniel Jefferson Harris (aka Dirty Dan) arrived in the Bellingham Bay area in 1853 or 1854, and befriended John Thomas, who had filed a land claim along Padden Creek. He helped Thomas start a cabin there, but Thomas died before the cabin was finished. Dan finished the claim on the land and the patent was issued in 1871. He also acquired several surrounding properties and named this area Fairhaven, from the native name see-see-lich-em, meaning safe port or fair haven (possibly also from a town in Maine that may or may not have been his birthplace). He platted the town in 1883 and began selling lots. As his fortune improved so did his appearance and reputation, allowing him to marry in 1885. In 1888, he sold most of his property in Fairhaven to Nelson Bennett and left for California. Nelson Bennett, along with Charles Larrabee, who arrived in 1890, formed the Fairhaven Land Company, mostly financed by Larrabee, determined to grow Fairhaven into a major city. They promoted the land rich in natural resources, good weather, and endless possibilities, causing the population to grow from around 150 in 1889 to 8000 at the end of 1890. Part of that increase was due to the purchase by the Fairhaven Land Company of a tiny settlement called Bellingham, tucked between Sehome and Fairhaven, which had a post office starting in 1883.

Fairhaven, like many other coastal Washington cities, competed with other Washington cities for the position of terminal city of the Great Northern Railroad, but that title ultimately fell on Seattle. During this period of competitiveness, which lasted from the late 1870s through mid-1880s, Fairhaven adopted its iconic 19th century style and took on an aesthetic appeal to architecture and design. Even after it was decided that Seattle would house the Great Northern Railroad terminal, population and aesthetically-minded construction continued to boom until the late 1890s. Fairhaven was officially incorporated on May 13, 1890.

During the speculative frenzy of the 1890s, the grand Fairhaven Hotel was built to attract railroad tycoons to choose Fairhaven as the west coast terminus of transcontinental railways. The railways never came, but the imposing old hotel stood until a fire and demolition in 1953. Another remnant of this period was the 1888 Terminal Building, which stood as Fairhaven's oldest surviving structure until it, too, was gutted by fire in 2023 and subsequently demolished.

On October 27, 1903, citizens of Fairhaven and citizens of a neighboring city on Bellingham Bay, Whatcom City, voted to consolidate into one city named Bellingham. On December 28, 1903, the new city of Bellingham was officially established.

In 1903, Fairhaven received a grant to build the area's first Carnegie-funded library on 12th Street. The library continues to operate as a branch of the Bellingham Public Library system.

Fairhaven is also known for its historical ties to salmon canning, and from the late 1800s through to the 1940s was the home of numerous salmon canning operations, employing as many as 4,500 workers in the area. In the 1940s, the Pacific American Fisheries was headquartered in Fairhaven, and was known as the largest salmon canning operation in the world.

== See also ==
- Fairhaven Station
