= Interurban Trail (Whatcom County) =

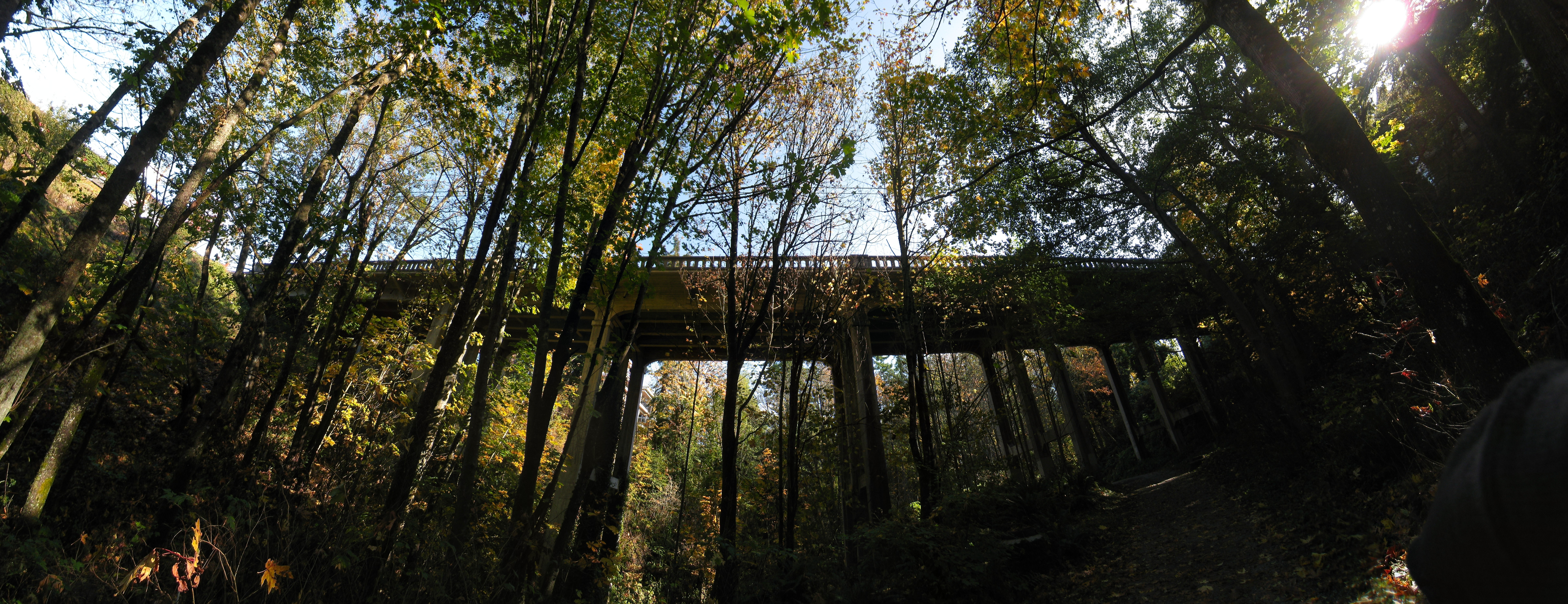
- Interurban Trail passing under the Padden Creek Bridge near the Fairhaven trailhead
- Length: 6.6 miles (10.6 km)
- Location: Whatcom County, Washington
- Trailheads: Fairhaven to Larrabee State Park
- Use: Bicycling, Hiking
- Hazards: Road crossings

The Interurban Trail is a rail trail in Whatcom County, Washington. Built for bicycle and hiking recreation, the trail runs 6.6 miles (10.6 km) between Fairhaven and Larrabee State Park in the Bellingham area.

== Route ==
The trail's northernmost trailhead can be accessed in downtown Fairhaven, connecting to Boulevard Park, downtown Bellingham and onwards to Fairhaven Park, Arroyo Park, and Teddy Bear Cove Park. Additional access includes North Chuckanut Mountain Trailhead, Hiline Road, Fragrance Lake Trailhead, and Clayton Beach Trailhead.

Interurban Trail runs parallel to Chuckanut Drive through the Chuckanut Mountains. The trail follows the shoreline of the Salish Sea and Puget Sound, with views of Bellingham Bay, the Lummi Peninsula, Portage Island, Lummi Island, Chuckanut Bay and the distant San Juan Islands.

== History ==
The trail is constructed on the bed of the old Bellingham & Skagit Interurban Railway, an electric railway line that connected Whatcom County and Skagit counties from 1912 to 1930. A northern trail section follows the rail bed of the Fairhaven & Southern Railroad that ran coal trains to and from Sedro-Woolley in the late 1800s through the turn of the 19th century.
