= Secondary State Highway 1F =

There were two secondary state highways in Washington numbered 1F:

- Secondary State Highway 1F (Washington 1937-1961), now SR 20 between Burlington and Sedro-Woolley
- Secondary State Highway 1F (Washington 1967-1970), now part of SR 11 in Bellingham
