= Loup Loup =

Loup Loup may refer to:

- Loup Loup Pass, a mountain pass in Okanogan County, Washington
- Loup Loup Ski Bowl, a ski area in Okanogan County
- Loop Loop, Washington, a ghost town in Okanogan County also known as Loup Loup

== See also ==
- Loup (disambiguation)
