= Loup =

Loup (French for wolf) may refer to:

== Places ==
- The Loup, a village in Northern Ireland
- Loup Canal, a canal in Nebraska
- Loup County, Nebraska
- Loup River, a tributary of the Platte River in Nebraska, USA
- Loup (river), a coastal river in southeastern France
- Loup Township (disambiguation), multiple locations

== Other ==
- Loup (film), a 2009 film by Nicolas Vanier
- Loup (card game), a historic card game variant of Tippen
- Loup (name), French given name and surname
- "Loup (1st Indian on the Moon)", a song by Paul McCartney and Wings from the 1973 album Red Rose Speedway
- Saint Lupus (disambiguation) (Saint Loup), the name of some early French bishops
- Loup languages, a group of extinct Algonquian languages as attested in manuscripts of French missionaries
- Archaic blazon for wolf (heraldry)
- Loup, a character in the webcomic Gunnerkrigg Court

== See also ==
- Loup Loup (disambiguation)
- Loop (disambiguation)
- Loupe, a magnification device
- Wolf (disambiguation)
