= Chuckanut Bay =

Bay in Washington, United States

Coordinates: 48.683°N 122.497°W

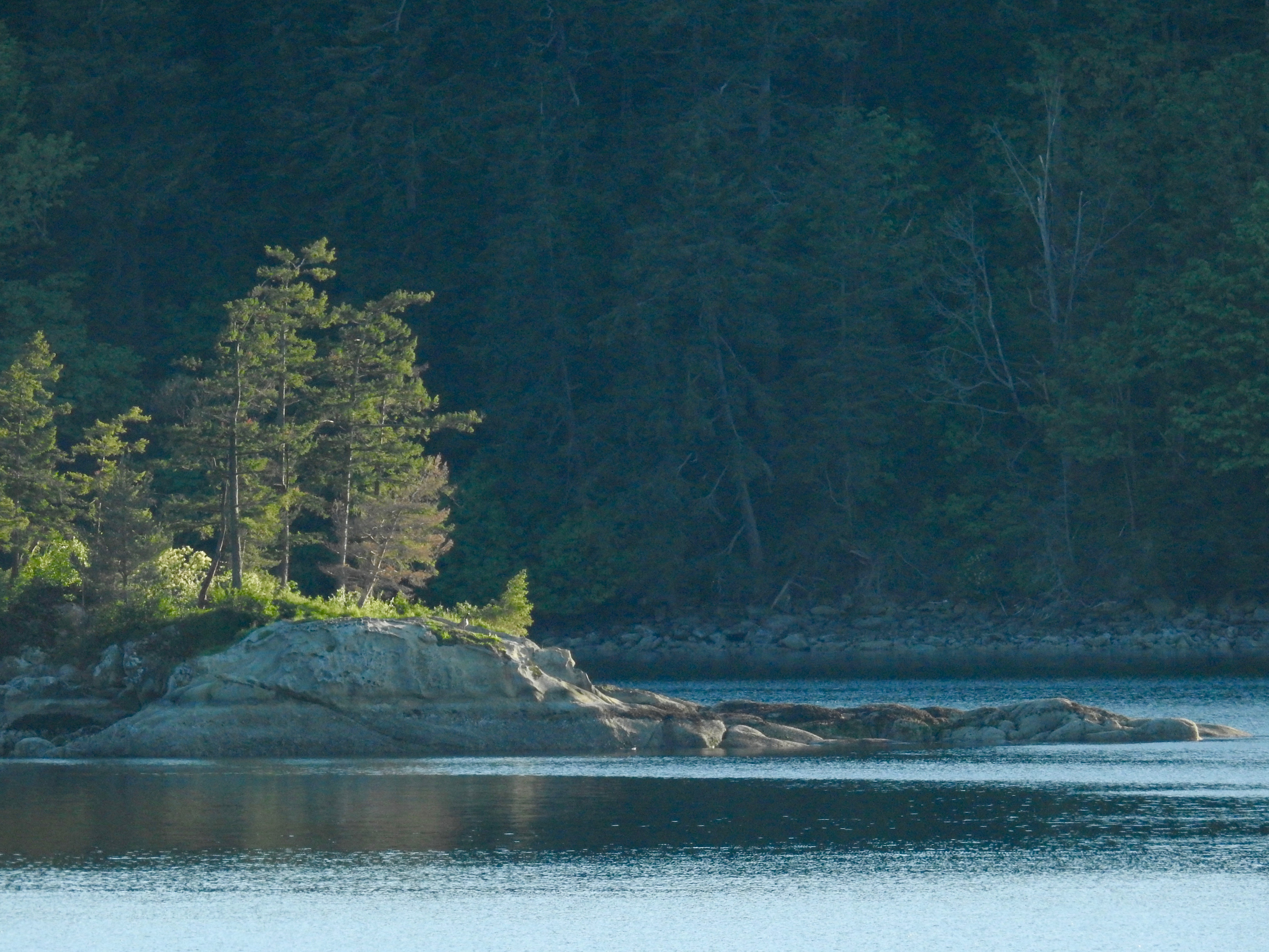
Chuckanut Point near the south end of Chuckanut Bay

Chuckanut Bay is a crescent-shaped bay about three miles (4.8 km) long in southwestern Whatcom County, directly south of Bellingham, Washington, United States. The bay was formed along the axis of a plunging syncline during the formation of the Chuckanut Mountains. It is situated on the eastern shore of the Salish Sea at the southeast end of Bellingham Bay. The bay was named Puerto del Socorro by Lieutenant Juan Francisco de Eliza in 1791. The present name was chosen by Captain Henry Roeder on December 1, 1852. Natural features include Pleasant Bay located south of Chuckanut Bay, Mud Bay to the north, and Chuckanut Island (a.k.a. Dot Island) and Chuckanut Rocks to the west. Other natural features include Teddy Bear Cove, Governors Point and Clark Point. Several creeks drain into the bay, including Chuckanut Creek and Fragrance Lake Outlet. The bay is home to tafoni formations found in the area.

== Etymology ==
The name 'Chuckanut' is derived from one of several Coast Salish languages. In the Nooksack language, the name Chúkwenet (Note: Also recorded as Chúkwenets or Nooksack: Chúkwenech) refers to Chuckanut Creek and the Nooksack camping ground at its mouth. According to anthropologist Allan Richardson and linguist Brent Galloway, the Nooksack name means "beach or tide goes way out", from the root word chúkw, 'be distant, far away' and the suffix -enech, 'at the bottom'. According to linguist William Bright, the English name is derived from the neighboring Lummi dialect of North Straits Salish, which itself is derived from the original Nooksack. In the Samish dialect of North Straits, the name for the creek is Chúkwenet.

Alternatively, linguist Wayne Suttles proposed in 2005 that the name Chúkwenet (and its related forms) may be instead originally derived from Northern Straits. Suttles proposed that the root word instead was chéqw, 'burn', yielding an alternative spelling of 'Chéqwenet.' Furthermore, the two forms may have coexisted.

In the Lushootseed language, the name for the bay was recorded as dxʷšišəlc̓əb according to Swinomish informant Martin Sampson. His mother, Susie Sampson Peter, said that dxʷšišəlc̓əb was a creek northeast of Chuckanut Bay.

== Communities ==
Chuckanut Village, located near Mud Bay along the north shore of Chuckanut Creek, is the southernmost neighborhood in Bellingham. The Chuckanut Bay Community is further south of Chuckanut Village and had a population of 60 people in the 1940s. It was centered around a ferry landing for the San Juan Islands and Sydney, BC from 1935 to 1941. After the ferry closed, the landing became the foundation for the Chuckanut Bay Yacht Club. When the yacht club closed in 1946, the clubhouse was moved to LaConner WA and is now a waterfront restaurant there.

The Chuckanut Bay Community Association (CBCA) currently has a membership of over 400 households. The CBCA is a non-profit organization committed to foster a spirit of community among residents in the Chuckanut Bay and Chuckanut Mountain area. The CBCA was initially formed in 1992 to support volunteer firefighters in their district, and continues today as a non-profit organization dedicated to serving the Chuckanut community. The communities are linked to Bellingham and Burlington by State Route 11, also known as Chuckanut Drive.

Chuckanut Beaches Association (CBA) is a private community association that shares five beaches among eligible property members. CBA was originally incorporated in 1954 as Chuckanut Beaches Inc. and was reincorporated in 1994 as Chuckanut Beaches Association. The five Chuckanut beaches were deeded from the Charles F. Larrabee estate (Larrabee State Park donor) to Chuckanut Beaches, Inc. in 1954. The quit-claim deed states: "Said land is hereby conveyed for park, boat haven, beach and playground purposes, or for one or more of the aforesaid purposes, but may be held in an undeveloped state by grantee, its successors or assigns".

== History ==
- The Chuckanut Stone Quarry was opened in 1880 and closed in 1908.
- A salmon cannery opened in 1900, went bankrupt two years later, and became Astoria-Puget Sound Cannery. The cannery was moved to Excursion Outlet, Alaska after fish traps were outlawed in 1934. Old buildings were used as warehouses until 1948.
- Chuckanut Mountain was logged in the 1890s and the bay was used to raft logs and to load ships.
- Three and four masted sailing ships were built in the bay in the early 1900s.
- A brick and tile plant was opened in 1915 and ran for several years before it shut down.
- Moonshiners and rum runners used the bay during prohibition.
- Coal was mined and stone quarried on the west side of Governors Point in 1921.
- Pleasant Bay was used to overwinter moored sailing ships in 1902.
- A chicken ranch was operated from 1936 to 1964
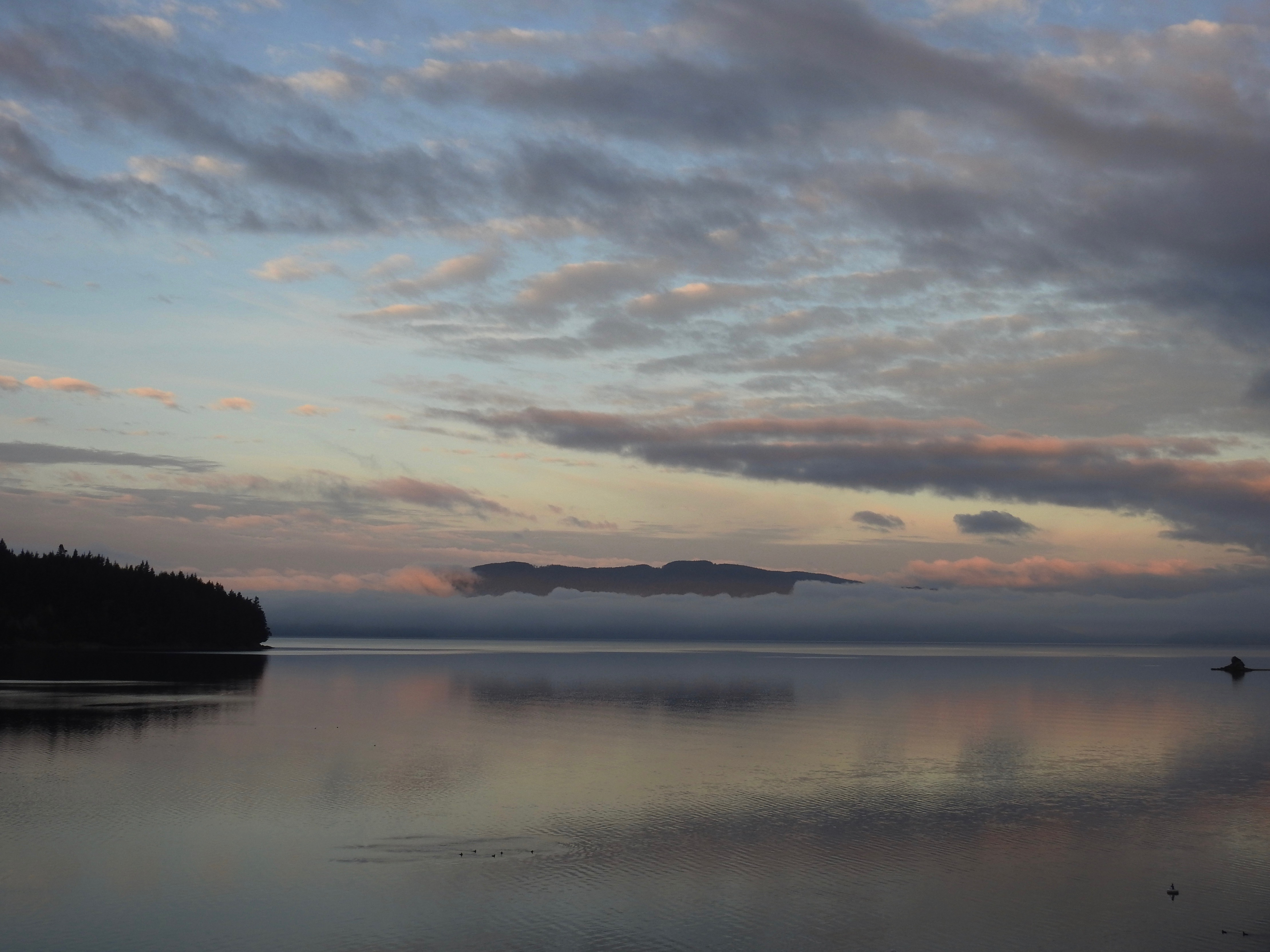
Looking West/South West With Northern End of Governor's Point and Eastern Shore of Lummi Island

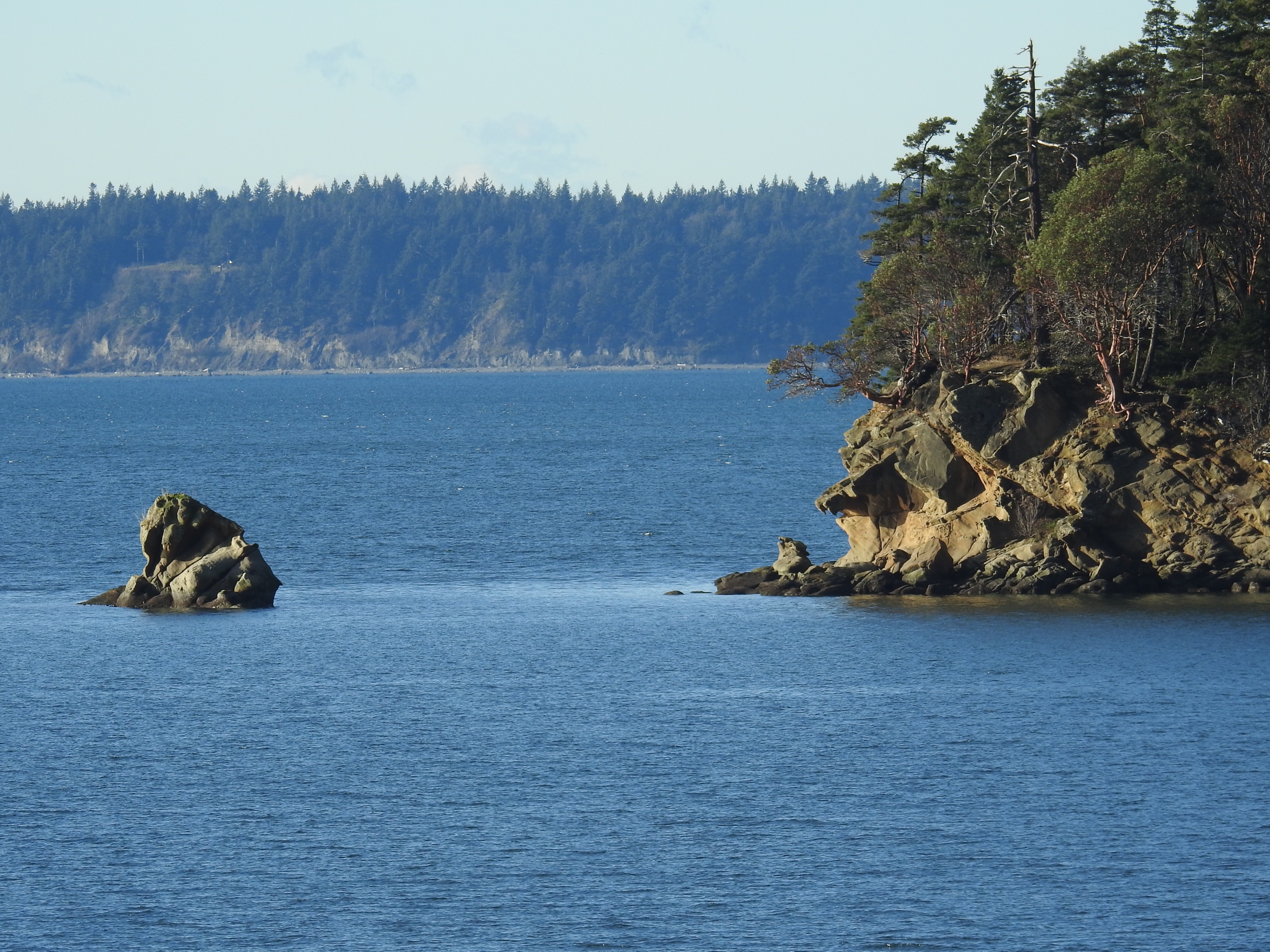
Northern End of Chuckanut Island Looking West Towards Portage Island

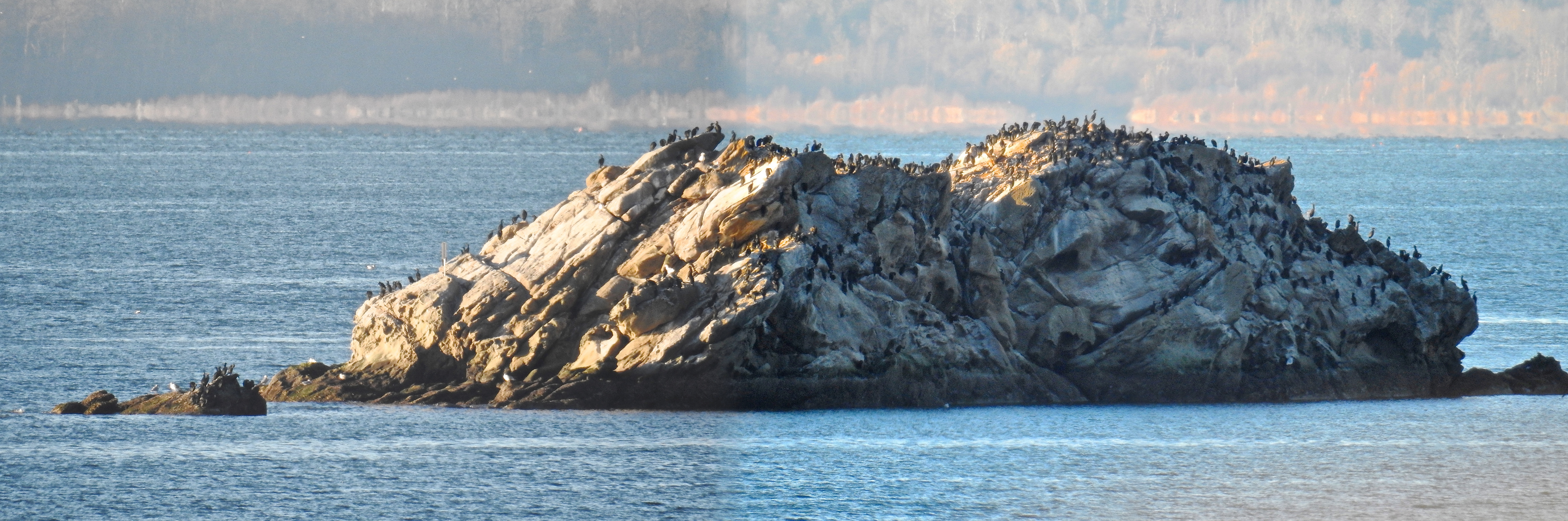
Chuckanut Rock in Western Portion of Chuckanut Bay
