= Interurban trail =

Interurban Trail may refer to:

- Interurban Trail (King County), a rail trail in King County, Washington
- Interurban Trail (Sangamon County), a rail trail in Sangamon County, Illinois
- Interurban Trail (Snohomish County), a rail trail in Snohomish County, Washington
- Interurban Trail (Whatcom County), a rail trail in Whatcom County, Washington
- Ozaukee Interurban Trail, a rail trail in Ozaukee County, Wisconsin
