= Washington State Route 11 =

Highway in Washington

State Route 11
- Chuckanut Drive
- SR 11 highlighted in red

Route information
- Maintained by WSDOT
- Length: 21.30 mi (34.28 km)
- Existed: 1964–present
- Tourist routes: Chuckanut Drive Scenic Byway

Major junctions
- South end: I-5 in Burlington
- North end: I-5 in Bellingham

Location
- Country: United States
- State: Washington
- Counties: Skagit, Whatcom

Highway system
- State highways in Washington; Interstate; US; State; Scenic; Pre-1964; 1964 renumbering; Former
← SR 10	→ US 12

State Route 11 (SR 11) is a 21.28-mile (34.25 km) long state highway that serves Skagit and Whatcom counties in the U.S. state of Washington. SR 11, known as Chuckanut Drive, begins at an interchange with Interstate 5 (I-5) north of Burlington and continues northwest through several small towns and the Chuckanut Mountains to the Fairhaven district of Bellingham, where the highway turns east and ends again at I-5.

A segment of what is now SR 11 was originally added to the state highway system in 1895 as a Blanchard – Whatcom County line road. The highway became State Road 6 in 1905 and was named Waterfront Road in 1907. The road was incorporated into the Pacific Highway in 1913 and U.S. Route 99 (US 99) in 1926. After an inland bypass was designated by the state to become US 99 in 1931, Chuckanut Drive became U.S. Route 99 Alternate. During the 1964 highway renumbering, the road became SR 11. In 1987, SR 11 was realigned through Bellingham, shifting its northern terminus south to Fairhaven.

== Route description ==
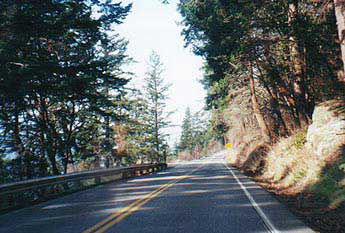
SR 11 in the Chuckanut Mountains south of Bellingham

SR 11, also named Chuckanut Drive, begins north of Burlington at a partial cloverleaf interchange with I-5. The interchange includes two roundabouts that also connect with Burlington Boulevard and Josh Wilson Road. The highway travels northwest through farmland at the north edge of the Skagit Valley, generally following the BNSF Bellingham Subdivision, a railroad that also carries Amtrak's Cascades passenger trains. SR 11 then turns north at a junction with Bow Hill Road (formerly SR 537) near the communities of Edison and Bow at the head of Samish Bay.

The highway crosses over the railroad near Blanchard and turns northwest to follow Samish Bay around the west side of Blanchard Mountain at the south end of the Chuckanut Mountains. A sculpture of the Loch Ness Monster in Samish Bay is visible from the road and was installed by a local artist in the 2010s. Chuckanut Drive then passes a Taylor Shellfish oyster farm and traverses a pair of hairpin turns at Oyster Creek near Pigeon Point. SR 11 crosses into Whatcom County and travels northwest through Larrabee State Park, the oldest state park in Washington, serving its trailhead parking lots, campgrounds, and a boat launch. Leaving the state park, the highway follows the Interurban Trail along Chuckanut Bay and through residential areas on the sides of the mountains.

Chuckanut Drive then enters the city of Bellingham and travels around an estuary near Teddy Bear Cove, a former nude beach, as it leaves the Interurban Trail. It travels through a residential neighborhood and descends into Fairhaven, a historic business district on Bellingham Bay with an Amtrak station and the Bellingham Cruise Terminal, the southern terminus of the Alaska Marine Highway ferry. The highway turns east onto Old Fairhaven Parkway and travels through a residential neighborhood as it heads uphill along Padden Creek. SR 11 then terminates at an interchange with I-5 in southern Bellingham, with the road continuing as Connelly Avenue towards the Lake Padden neighborhood.

SR 11 is designated as the Chuckanut Drive Scenic Byway, a state scenic byway, and is maintained by the Washington State Department of Transportation (WSDOT). WSDOT conducts an annual survey on state highways to measure traffic volume in terms of annual average daily traffic. Average traffic volumes on SR 11 in 2016 ranged from a minimum of 2,300 vehicles near Bow Hill Road to a maximum of 14,000 vehicles near Fairhaven. Chuckanut Drive is generally two lanes wide with a narrow shoulder and has seasonal peaks in use based on recreation and farming.

== History ==
U.S. Route 99 Alternate
- Location: Burlington–Bellingham
- Existed: 1937–1967

Parts of modern SR 11 have been part of the state highway systems in Washington since 1895, when a road from Blanchard to Whatcom County became a state-maintained roadway. The road became State Road 6 in 1905 and was named Waterfront Road in 1907. A survey of a north–south highway from Blaine to Vancouver was approved in 1909, and the highway was built as the Pacific Highway in 1913. In Skagit County, the Pacific Highway utilized the pre-existing State Road 6. Chuckanut Drive, a 20-mile-long (32 km) section of the Pacific Highway in the Chuckanut Mountains, was opened as a gravel road during the spring of 1916 and paved in 1921. The Pacific Highway became State Road 1 in a 1923 restructuring of the highway system, at which time State Road 6 was completely replaced. When the U.S. route system was formed in 1926, the Pacific Highway became US 99. In 1931, an inland bypass via Lake Samish was added to State Road 1 and US 99.

US 99 became Primary State Highway 1 (PSH 1) in 1937 and US 99 Alternate became the Chuckanut Drive branch of the main highway, running from Burlington to downtown Bellingham. A 1964 renumbering introduced a new system of sign routes that was scheduled to go into effect in 1970. As originally planned, the Chuckanut Drive branch of PSH 1—already US 99 Alternate—would be co-signed as SR 11. A freeway bypass of Bellingham on I-5 was opened to traffic on December 5, 1960, replacing US 99 through the city. The US 99 Alternate designation was fully replaced with SR 11 when the new numbering system was codified in 1970.

SR 11 originally continued northeast through Downtown Bellingham to the Iowa Street interchange with I-5. The state legislature created Secondary State Highway 1F (SSH 1F; also known as SR 110) in 1967, which would connect Chuckanut Drive in Fairhaven to I-5. A new highway on the corridor had been proposed by the Bellingham city government in 1966 and received approval from the Washington State Department of Highways in 1969. The 1.2-mile (1.9 km) road—named Valley Parkway—was opened to traffic in November 1972. SR 11 was rerouted onto the new highway when it opened, replacing SR 110, per a provision passed in 1971 by the state legislature. Valley Parkway was renamed to Old Fairhaven Parkway by the Bellingham Planning Commission in 1986, following a campaign by businesses and boosters in Fairhaven to promote the neighborhood's historic center.

== Major intersections ==
County	Location	mi	km	Destinations	Notes
Skagit	Burlington	0.00	0.00	I-5 – Seattle, Vancouver BC	Interchange, continues as Burlington Boulevard
Skagit		6.90	11.10	West Bow Hill Road	Former SR 237
Whatcom	Bellingham	21.30	34.28	I-5 – Seattle, Vancouver BC	Interchange, continues as Connelly Avenue
1.000 mi = 1.609 km; 1.000 km = 0.621 mi
