= Tiger, Washington =

Unincorporated community in Pend Oreille County, Washington, United States

- Unincorporated community
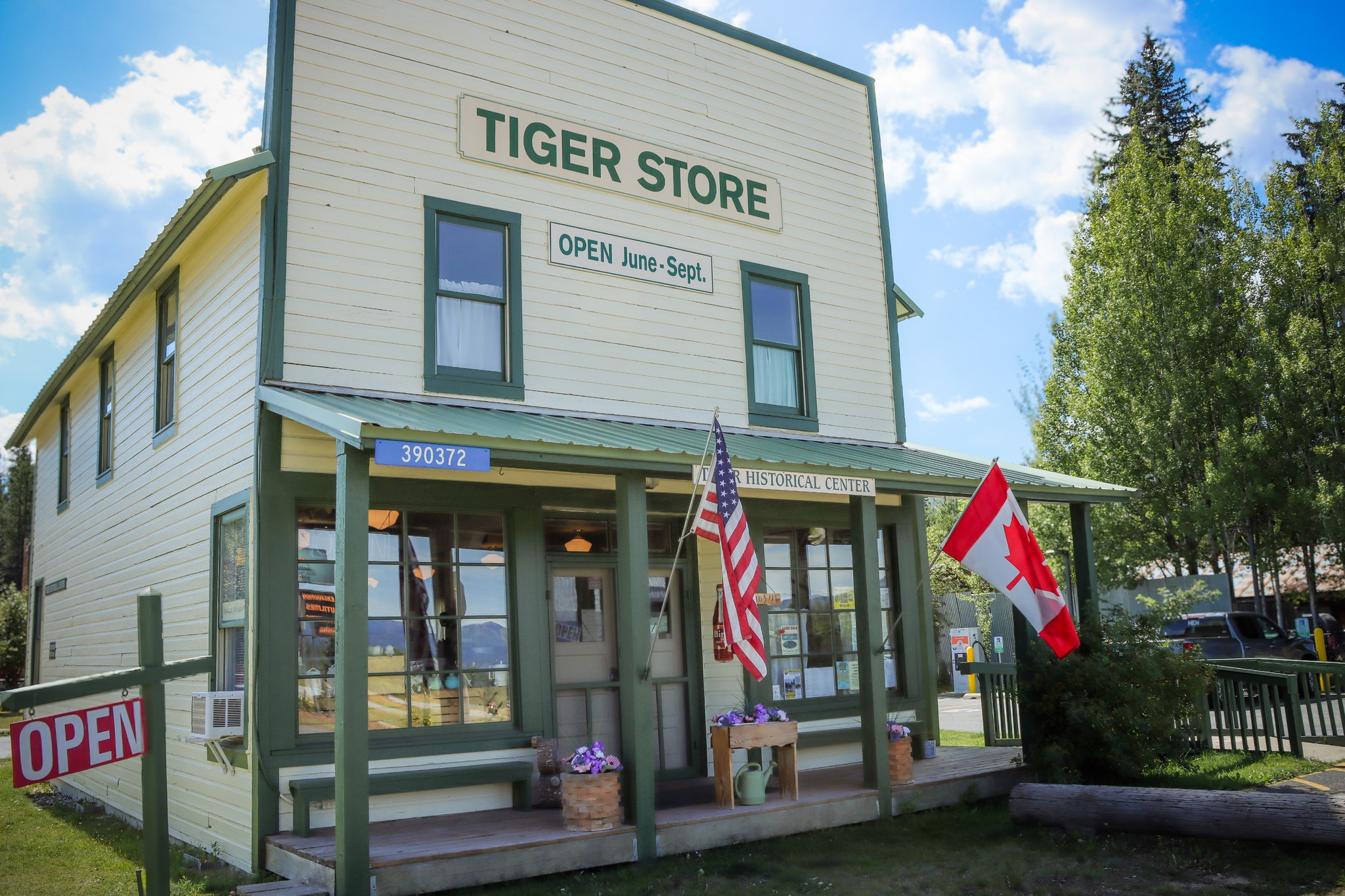
- Tiger Store and Historical Center

- Location within Washington (state)
- Coordinates: 48°41′30″N 117°24′28″W
- Country: United States
- State: Washington
- County: Pend Oreille
- Established: 1899
- Elevation: 2,087 ft (636 m)
- Time zone: UTC-8 (Pacific (PST))
  - Summer (DST): UTC-7 (PDT)
- Zip Code: 99119
- Area code: 509
- GNIS feature ID: 1528417

Tiger is an unincorporated community in Pend Oreille County, Washington, United States. Named for early settler George Tiger, Tiger is located near Washington State Route 31 3.5 miles (5.6 km) south of Ione. The area is now considered a part of Cusick, with its postal code being the same as Cusick's.

Tiger had its start in 1899 when George Tiger established a river landing there.

== Businesses ==
There is a small Tiger museum off of State Route 20, where it connects to State Route 31. It is held in the former Tiger Post Office, with small historic trinkets on display from when the area was incorporated.

== Geography ==
Tiger is located on the west bank of the Pend Oreille River as it flows north towards British Columbia, Canada. The nearest settlement is Ione.
