= Washington State Route 536 =

Highway in Washington serving Skagit County

State Route 536

- SR 536 highlighted in red

Route information
- Auxiliary route of I-5
- Maintained by WSDOT
- Length: 5.38 mi (8.66 km)
- Existed: 1964–present

Major junctions
- West end: SR 20 near Fredonia
- East end: I-5 in Mount Vernon

Location
- Country: United States
- State: Washington
- Counties: Skagit

Highway system
- State highways in Washington; Interstate; US; State; Scenic; Pre-1964; 1964 renumbering; Former
← SR 534	→ SR 538

State Route 536 (SR 536) is a 5.38-mile-long (8.66 km) state highway serving Skagit County in the U.S. state of Washington. The highway travels southeast from SR 20 near Fredonia through Mount Vernon to an interchange with Interstate 5 (I-5) on the east side of downtown Mount Vernon. SR 536 was created during the 1964 highway renumbering as a replacement for the Anacortes branch of Primary State Highway 1 (PSH 1). SR 536 was shortened to its current route in 1973 after SR 20 was extended west and a spur route was established to serve Anacortes.

== Route description ==
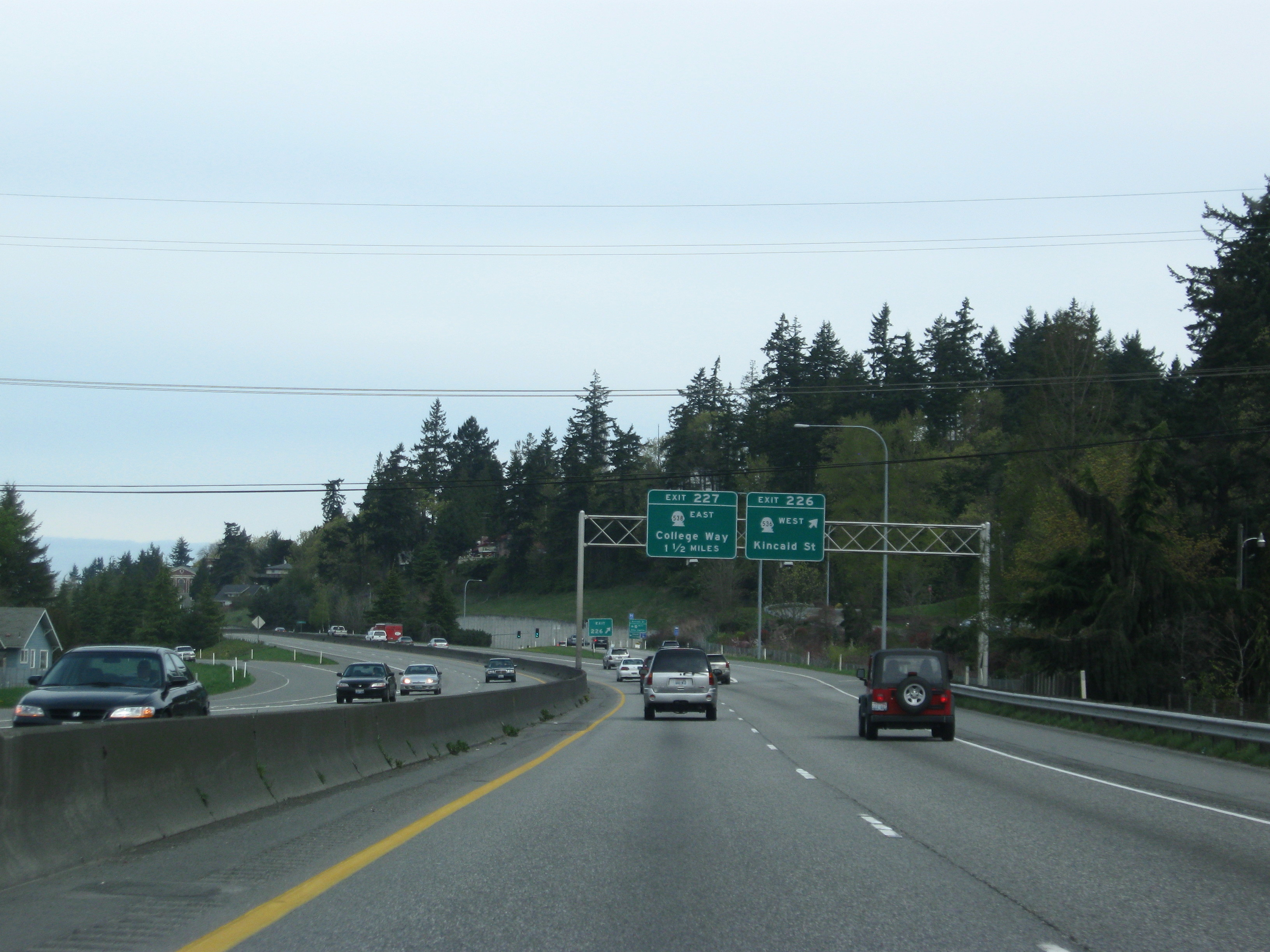
I-5 northbound approaching its interchange with SR 536 in Mount Vernon.

SR 536 begins as the Memorial Highway at an intersection with SR 20 located south of Skagit Regional Airport and east of Fredonia. The highway travels east through farmland before following the Skagit River southeast into Mount Vernon. SR 536 crosses the Skagit River on a swing bridge into Downtown Mount Vernon, turning east onto Division Street and south onto 3rd Street. The highway turns east at Skagit Station onto Kincaid Street and crosses a BNSF rail line before ending at a diamond interchange with I-5.

Every year, the Washington State Department of Transportation (WSDOT) conducts a series of surveys on its highways in the state to measure traffic volume. This is expressed in terms of annual average daily traffic (AADT), which is a measure of traffic volume for any average day of the year. In 2011, WSDOT calculated that between 4,600 and 23,000 vehicles per day used the highway, mostly in Downtown Mount Vernon.

== History ==
SR 536 was established during the 1964 highway renumbering as a 20.63-mile-long (33.20 km) highway connecting Anacortes to Mount Vernon. The highway, first codified as the Anacortes branch of PSH 1 in 1937, began at the Anacortes Ferry Terminal and traveled south to SR 525, turning east and traveling over the Swinomish Channel, leaving Fidalgo Island. SR 536 continued east to Fredonia, intersecting the termini of SR 20 and SR 537, before turning southeast over the Skagit River into Mount Vernon and ending at U.S. Route 99 (US 99).

The bridge over the Skagit River was rebuilt by the state government in 1954, at a cost of $1.03 million. US 99 and PSH 1 were replaced by I-5 in segments between 1966 and 1970, as SR 536 was widened, paved, and extended east to a new interchange. SR 20 was extended west to Whidbey Island and the Olympic Peninsula over SR 536 and SR 525 in 1973, shortening SR 536 to its current route and creating SR 20 Spur in Anacortes. The highway's eastern terminus at I-5 was expanded into a full diamond interchange in 1975 as part of a project to rebuild the freeway through Mount Vernon.

== Major intersections ==
The entire highway is in Skagit County.

Location	mi	km	Destinations	Notes
	0.00	0.00	SR 20 – Anacortes, Burlington	Western terminus
Mount Vernon	5.38	8.66	I-5 – Seattle, Vancouver, BC	I-5 exit 226; eastern terminus; interchange; continues as Broad Street.
1.000 mi = 1.609 km; 1.000 km = 0.621 mi
