= Bellingham Cruise Terminal =

Transportation hub located in Bellingham, Washington

Coordinates: 48°43′18″N 122°30′45″W

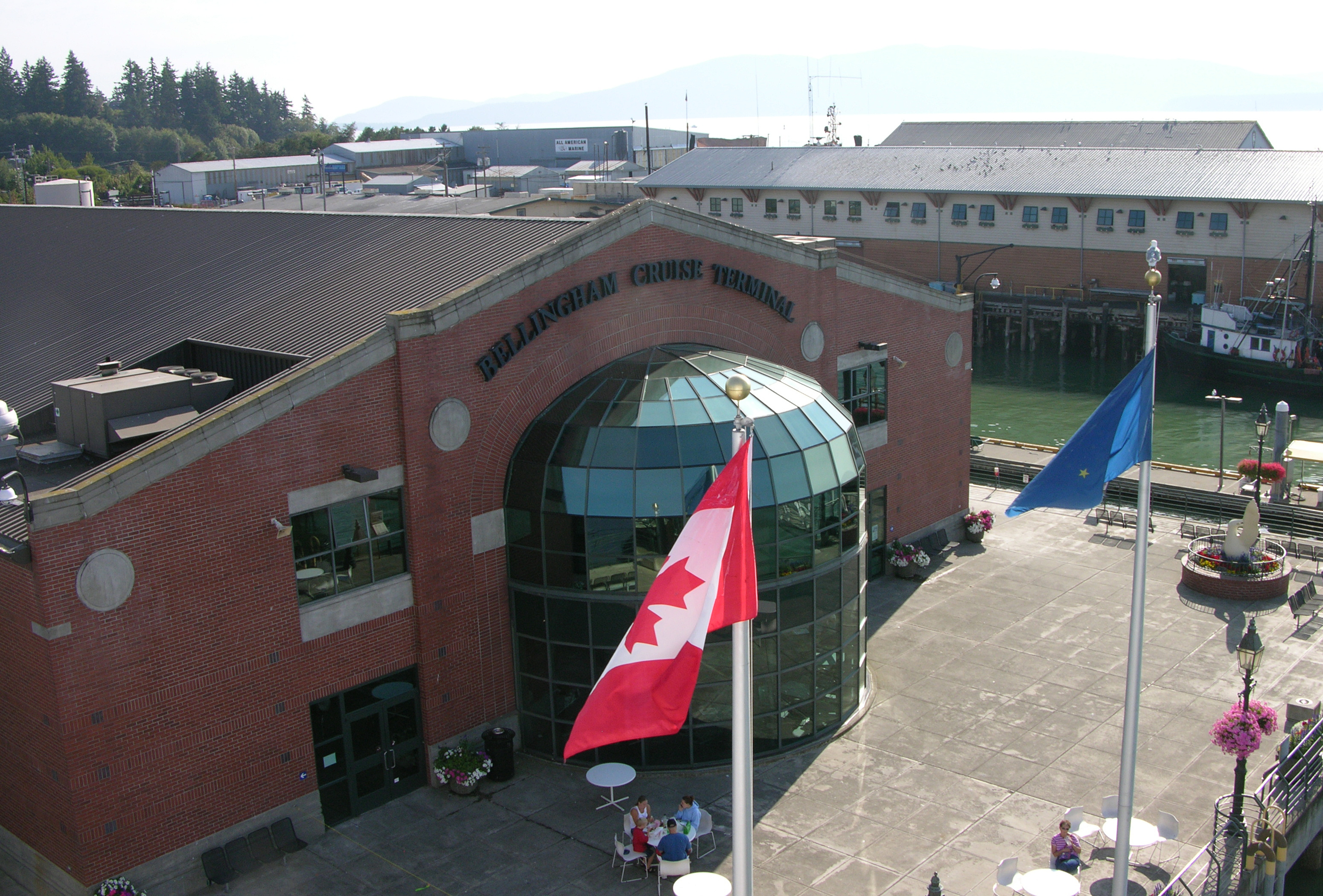
Bellingham Cruise Terminal

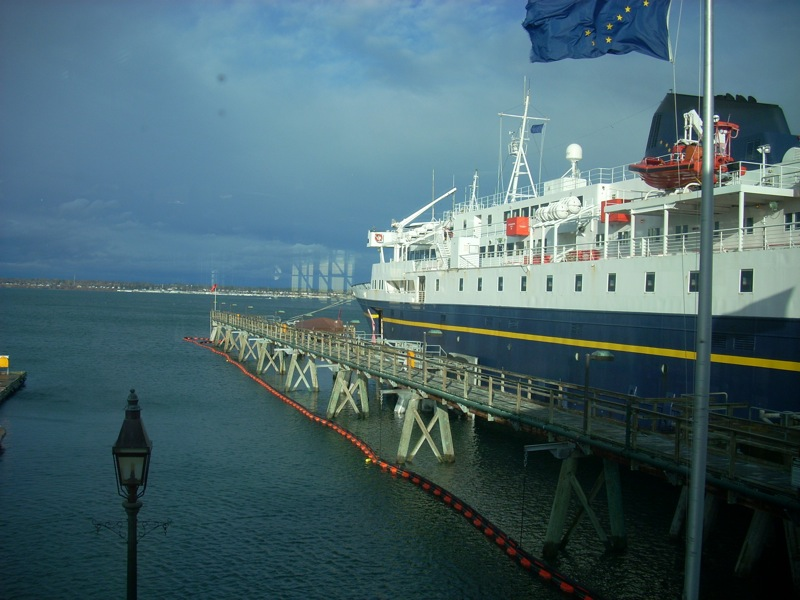
MV Malaspina docked at the Bellingham Cruise Terminal

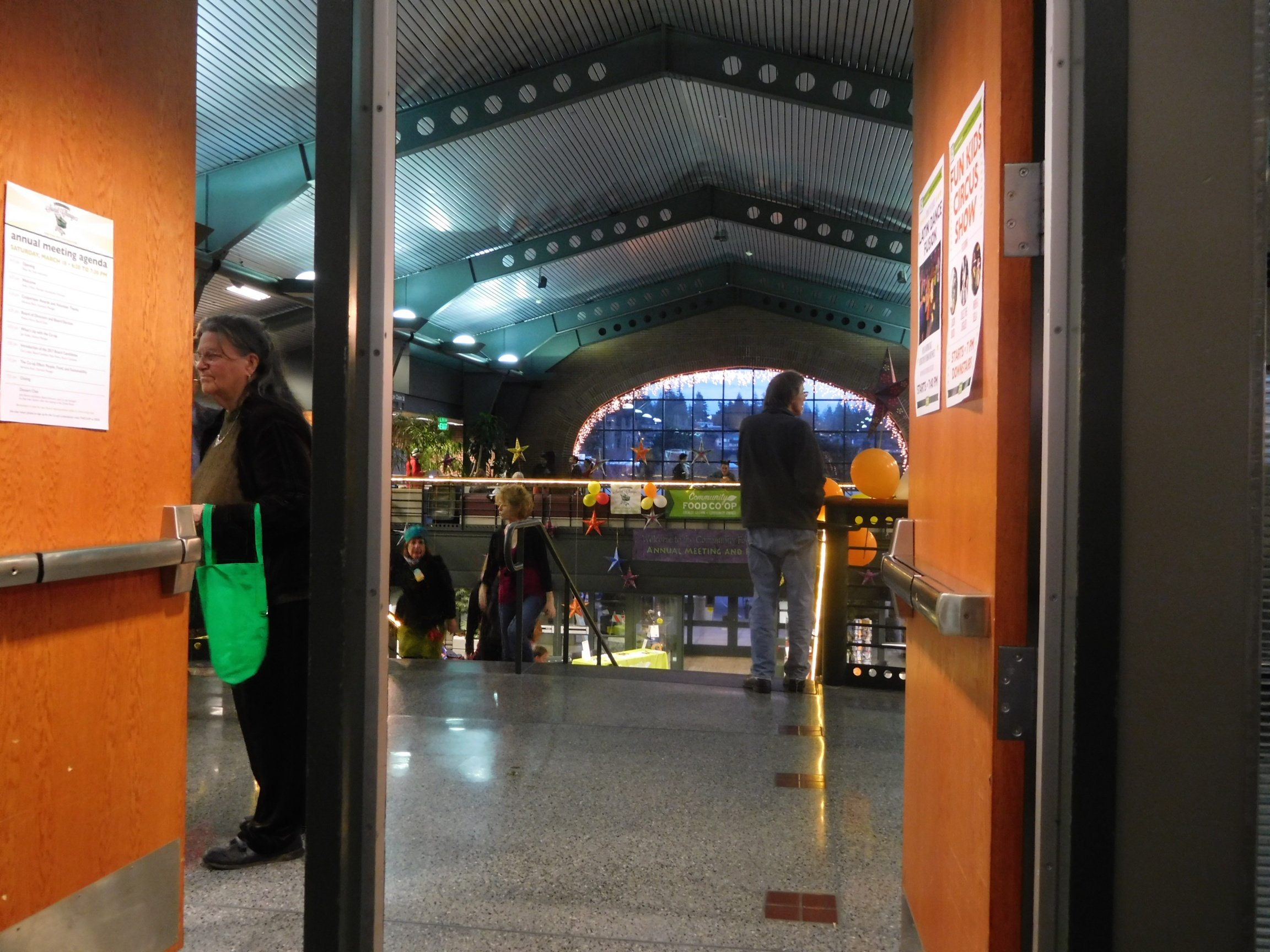
Interior of the terminal, set up for an event

The Bellingham Cruise Terminal is a ferry terminal and transportation hub located near the Fairhaven neighborhood in Bellingham, Washington, United States. It was completed in 1989 and provides easy interchange between various modes of transportation. Operated by the Port of Bellingham the facility serves over 200,000 passengers a year.

== Services and associated facilities ==
Ferry services include weekly Friday departures and arrivals on the state-run Alaska Marine Highway System. There is also an additional summer ferry on alternating Saturdays. Alaska-bound ferries also stop in Prince Rupert, British Columbia, providing a direct link between the lower 48 states and northern British Columbia.

The terminal offers regular passenger ferry access to the nearby San Juan Islands, operated by private companies. It is home port for small cruise ships, whale watching boats and charter vessels. Beginning in September 2020, the terminal has also been home to a temporary ferry to Point Roberts, providing alternative access amid the COVID-19 pandemic and closure of the Canadian border.

The cruise ship terminal is located adjacent to the Fairhaven train station, which is served by Amtrak's regional Cascades service. It is the northernmost stop in the United States, with trains continuing to Vancouver, British Columbia, and south to Seattle, Portland, Oregon, and Eugene, Oregon. The building is owned by the Port of Bellingham and also serves as a Greyhound bus terminal. Whatcom Transportation Authority operates local buses between the terminal and other parts of Bellingham. Private airport shuttles offer scheduled service to Bellingham International Airport.

A visitor information center is nearby on Harris Street. The Cruise Terminal includes a restaurant, short and long term parking, and vessel sewer pump-out. The terminal is accessed from Interstate 5 via State Route 11.
