= Washington State Route 237 =

Former state highway in western Washington, US

State Route 237

- SR 237 highlighted in red.

Route information
- Auxiliary route of SR 20
- Maintained by WSDOT
- Length: 9.07 mi (14.60 km)
- Existed: 1975–1991

Major junctions
- South end: SR 20 in Fredonia
- North end: SR 11 near Edison

Location
- Country: United States
- State: Washington
- Counties: Skagit

Highway system
- State highways in Washington; Interstate; US; State; Scenic; Pre-1964; 1964 renumbering; Former
← SR 231	→ SR 240
← SR 536	→ SR 538

State Route 237 (SR 237, now Best Road, Farm to Market Road, Mactaggart Avenue and West Bow Hill Road) was a 9.07-mile (14.60 km) Washington state highway that ran from SR 20 in Fredonia, through Edison and ending at SR 11 east of Edison. The roadway was established in 1937 as Secondary State Highway 1C and was renumbered to State Route 537 in 1964, before being renumbered to SR 237 in 1975. The road was decommissioned in 1991.

== Route description ==
State Route 237 (SR 237) began at an intersection with SR 20 as Best Road. From the terminus, the roadway turned north and crossed railroad tracks that are owned by the BNSF Railway and became Farm to Market Road. Once over the tracks, the highway passed the Skagit Regional Airport and intersected Josh Wilson Road, which travels west to Bay View. SR 237 traveled over the Samish River and later entered Edison where it curved east as Mactaggart Avenue. The highway bridged Edison Slough and became West Bow Hill Road to continue east across the Edison Slough again and end at an intersection with SR 11. In 1970, the intersection with SR 11 had a daily average of 1,410 motorists, making it the most used section of the roadway as a whole. In 1991, the busiest section moved south, before the intersection with Ovenell Road, the southern connector to Skagit Regional Airport, with a daily average of 2,300 motorists.

== History ==
During the creation of the primary and secondary state highway numbering system in 1937, a highway extending from the Anacortes branch of State Highway 1 (PSH 1 AN) in Fredonia to PSH 1 east of Edison was established as Secondary State Highway 1C (SSH 1C). SSH 1C became SR 537 during the 1964 highway renumbering. SR 20 was extended west to Discovery Bay in 1973 and two years later, in 1975, SR 537 was renumbered to SR 237. SR 237 was later removed from the highway system in 1991.

== Major intersections ==
The entire route was in Skagit County.

Location	mi	km	Destinations	Notes
Fredonia	0.00	0.00	Best Road – La Conner, Conway; SR 20 – Oak Harbor, Burlington, Sedro-Woolley	
	9.07	14.60	SR 11 – Bellingham, Burlington; Bow Hill Road – Bow	
1.000 mi = 1.609 km; 1.000 km = 0.621 mi
