= Delancy Ridge =

Ridge in Washington, US

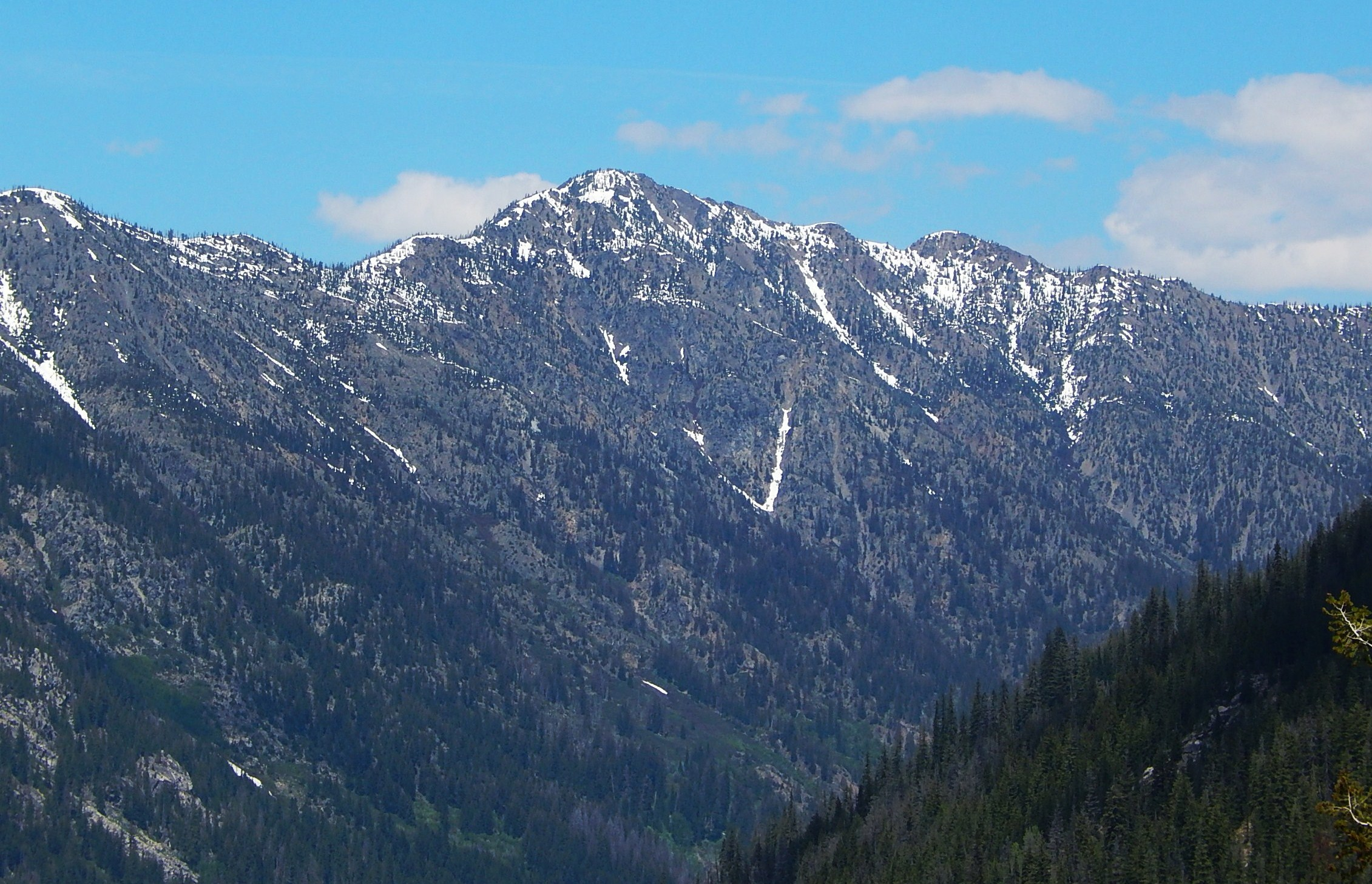
- Delancy Ridge seen from North Cascades Highway near Washington Pass

Highest point
- Elevation: 7,228 ft (2,203 m)
- Prominence: 748 ft (228 m)
- Isolation: 1.15 mi (1.85 km)
- Coordinates: 48°37′02″N 120°36′15″W

Geography
- Location within Washington (state) Location within the United States
- Interactive map of Delancy Ridge
- Country: United States
- State: Washington
- County: Okanogan
- Protected area: Okanogan–Wenatchee National Forest
- Parent range: Okanogan Range; North Cascades
- Topo map: USGS Silver Star Mountain

Delancy Ridge is a four-mile-long ridge located in Okanogan County of Washington state. It is part of the Okanogan Range which is a sub-range of the North Cascades. Delancy Ridge is situated east of The Needles on land administered by the Okanogan–Wenatchee National Forest. Delancy Ridge can be seen from Washington Pass and from the North Cascades Highway which follows the length of its southern base. Precipitation runoff from the north side of the ridge drains into the Methow River, whereas the south side drains into Early Winters Creek which is a tributary of the Methow River. This landform's toponym was officially adopted in 1978 by the United States Board on Geographic Names.

== Climate ==
Weather fronts originating in the Pacific Ocean travel northeast toward the Cascade Mountains. As fronts approach the North Cascades, they are forced upward by the peaks of the Cascade Range (orographic lift), causing them to drop their moisture in the form of rain or snowfall onto the Cascades. As a result, the west side of the North Cascades experiences high precipitation, especially during the winter months in the form of snowfall. Because of maritime influence, snow tends to be wet and heavy, resulting in high avalanche danger. During winter months, weather is usually cloudy, but due to high pressure systems over the Pacific Ocean that intensify during summer months, there is often little or no cloud cover during the summer.

== Geology ==
The North Cascades features some of the most rugged topography in the Cascade Range with craggy peaks, ridges, and deep glacial valleys. Geological events occurring many years ago created the diverse topography and drastic elevation changes over the Cascade Range leading to the various climate differences. These climate differences lead to vegetation variety defining the ecoregions in this area.

The history of the formation of the Cascade Mountains dates back millions of years ago to the late Eocene Epoch. With the North American Plate overriding the Pacific Plate, episodes of volcanic igneous activity persisted. In addition, small fragments of the oceanic and continental lithosphere called terranes created the North Cascades about 50 million years ago.

During the Pleistocene period dating back over two million years ago, glaciation advancing and retreating repeatedly scoured the landscape leaving deposits of rock debris. The U-shaped cross section of the river valleys is a result of recent glaciation. Uplift and faulting in combination with glaciation have been the dominant processes which have created the tall peaks and deep valleys of the North Cascades area.

== Gallery ==
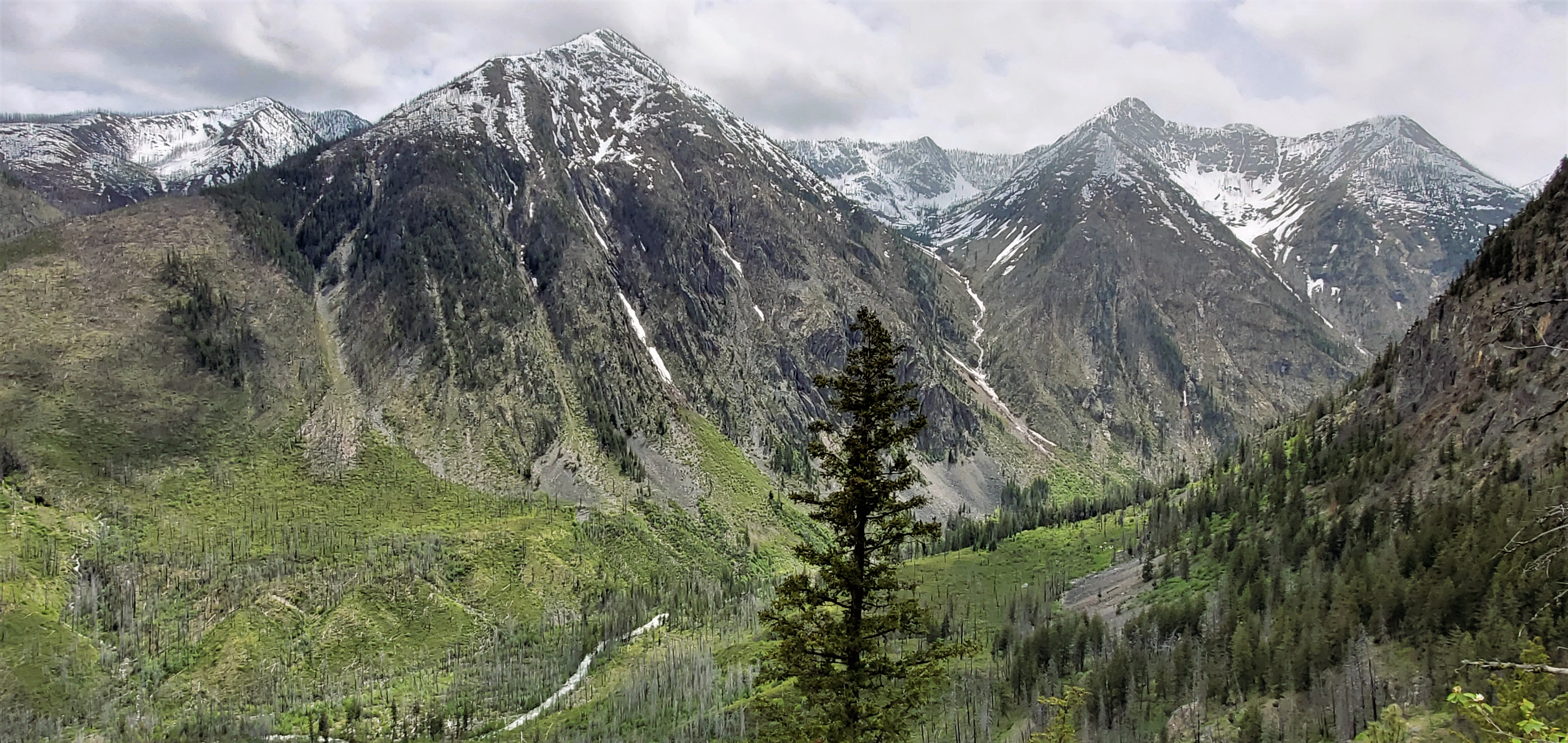
North side of Delancy Ridge

== See also ==
- Geography of the North Cascades
