= Saint Lupus =

Saint Lupus may refer to:

- Lupus of Troyes (c. 383–c. 478), early bishop of Troyes
- Lupus of Sens (died 623), bishop of Sens
- Lupus of Novae, slave of Saint Demetrius of Thessaloniki
