= Loup Loup Ski Bowl =

Ski area in Washington, United States

Loup Loup
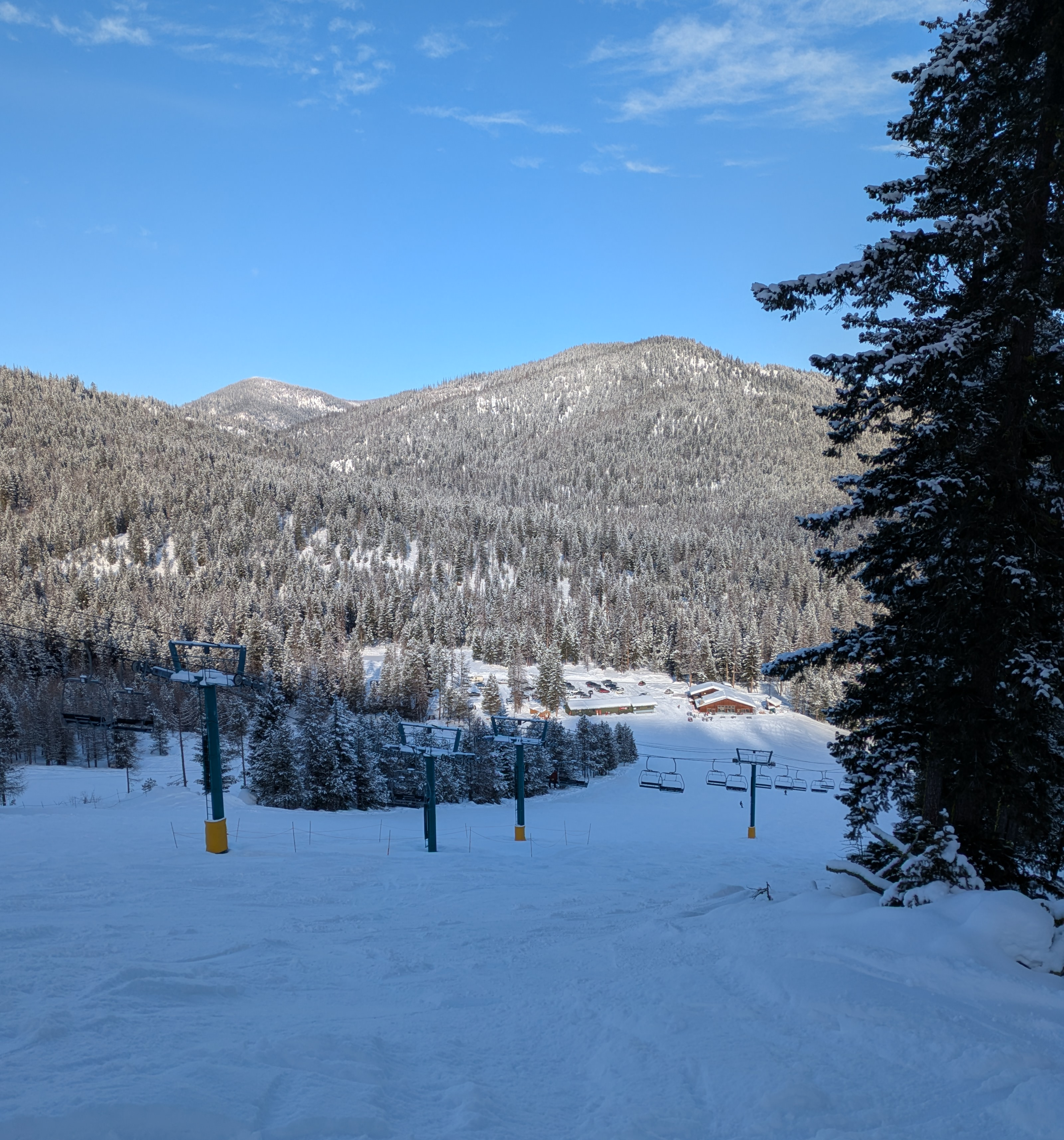
- View of the base area from partway up the main run

- Location in Washington Loup Loup (the United States)
- Location: Loup Loup Pass, Okanogan County, Washington, USA
- Nearest city: Twisp, Washington (12 miles east)
- Coordinates: 48°23′41″N 119°54′46″W
- Top elevation: 5,280 ft (1,610 m)
- Base elevation: 4,040 ft (1,230 m)
- Skiable area: 550 acres (2.2 km^{2})
- Trails: 10
- Longest run: 2 mi (3.2 km)
- Lift system: 1 chair, 1 platter lift, 1 rope tow
- Snowfall: 12.5 ft (3.8 m)
- Website: Ski the Loup

Loup Loup Ski Bowl is a ski area located in Okanogan County, Washington, midway between the towns of Twisp and Okanogan on Highway 20.

The ski area's season generally runs from late December or early January to the end of March, but is only open four days out of the week, and on holidays. Loup Loup offers ski and snowboard lessons, rentals, and also children's programs.

Loup Loup has been recognized as a safe ski area with short lift lines, polite skiers, and reasonably priced food by Seattle Post-Intelligencer.

== Alpine Skiing ==
Loup Loup features a vertical rise of 1220 feet (370 m) to a top elevation of 5280 feet (1610 m) above sea level. Loup has 550 acres (2.2 km²) of alpine skiing area. The hill has 10 major runs, and 3 lifts, including a quad chair that was moved to Loup Loup from Crystal Mountain. The mountain is operated by a non-profit ski education foundation with a board of fifteen volunteers.

== Cross-Country Skiing ==
From the base area, 23 km of cross country trails are accessible, with another 50 km of trails maintained by Washington State Parks nearby.

== Other Activities ==
In 2022 the Loup began offering summer activities, including an 18 hole alpine disc golf course, mountain and gravel bike rentals, and summer camping. During the winter they also offer a tubing hill and luge run.
