= Loup Loup Pass =

Mountain pass in Okanogan County, Washington

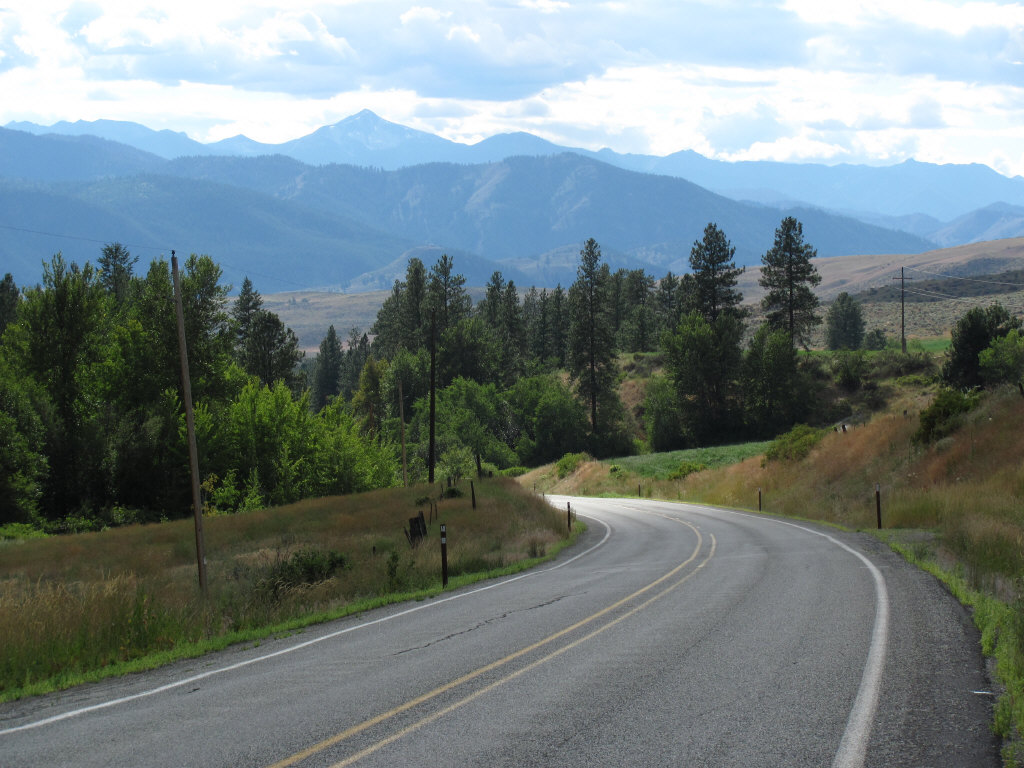
- Interactive map of Loup Loup Pass
- Elevation: 4,020 ft (1,230 m)
- Traversed by: State Route 20

Third Approach
- Location: Okanogan County, Washington, United States
- Range: Cascades
- Coordinates: 48°23′12″N 119°53′40″W

Loup Loup Pass (el. 4020 ft./1225 m.) is a mountain pass in the Cascades in the state of Washington.

It is located east of the Methow Valley of Okanogan County, between the towns of Twisp and Okanogan on State Route 20. A small ski area is located at the pass.
