= Chuckanut Mountains =

Mountain range in Washington, United States

Coordinates: 48°40′44″N 122°28′5″W

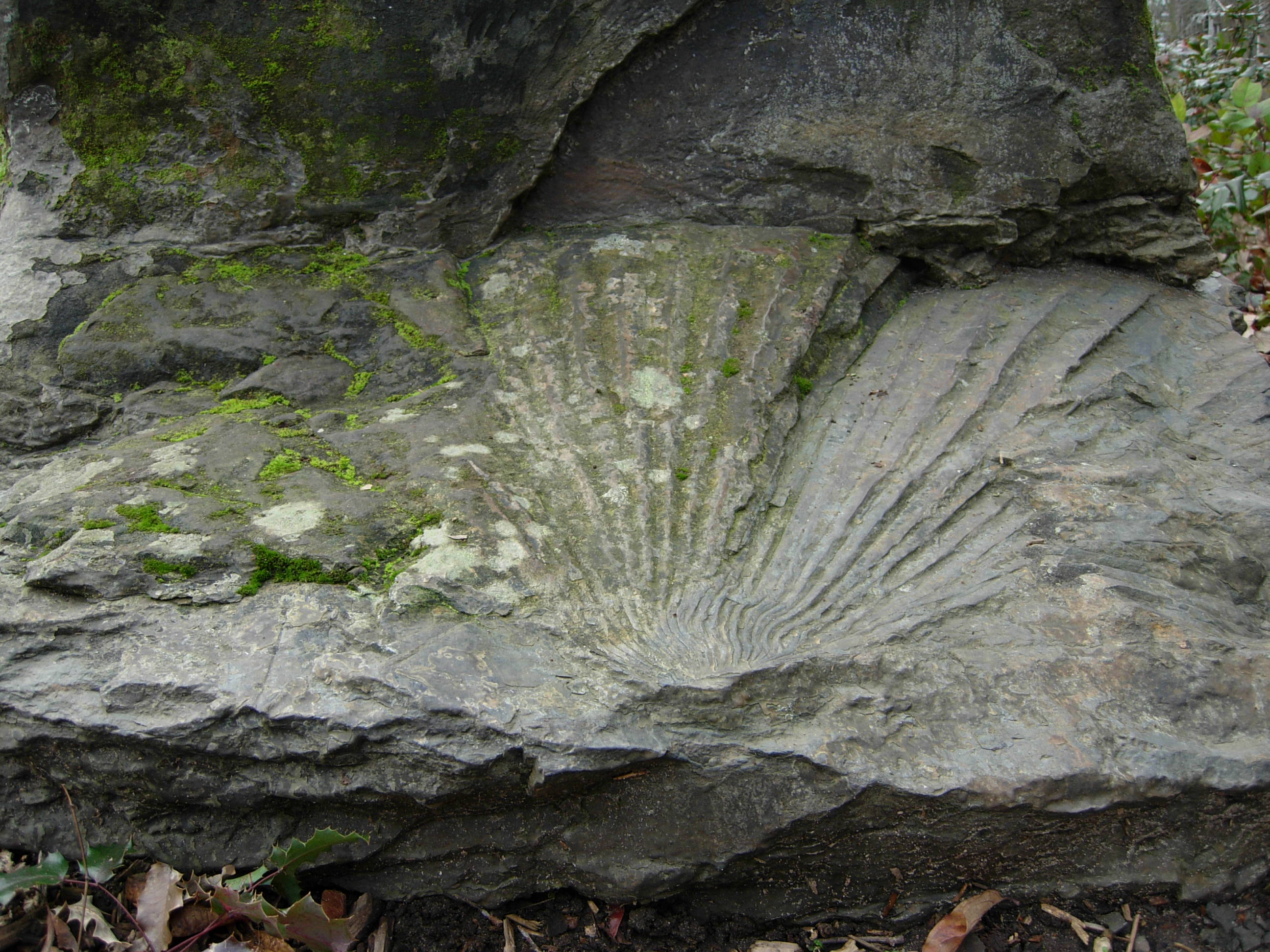
Fossils of Sabalites campbelli, extinct Palm leaves, in the Chuckanut Formation.

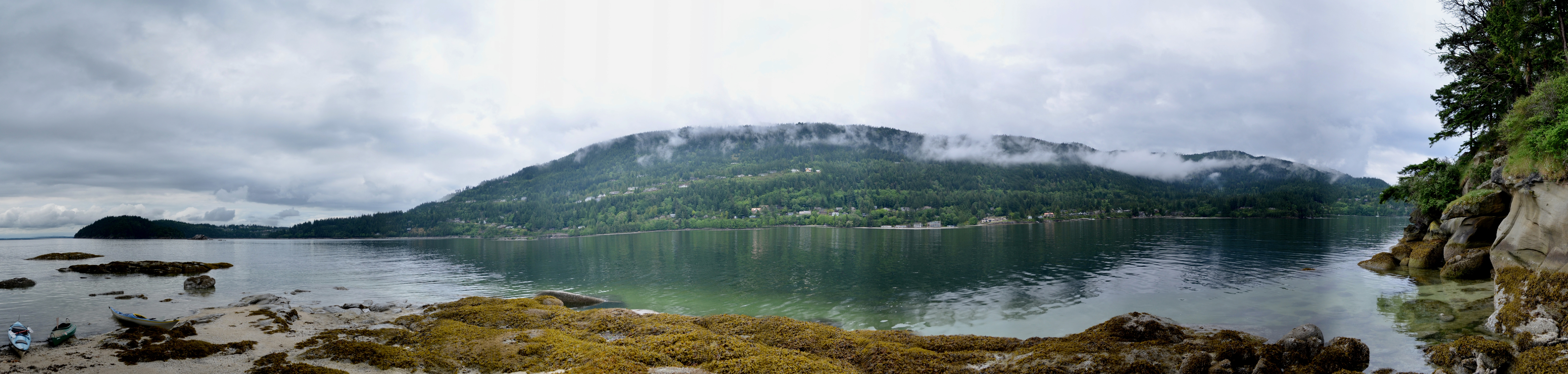
Chuckanut Mountain Looking east from Chuckanut Island

The Chuckanut Mountains (from "Chuckanut", an indigenous word meaning "long beach far from a narrow entrance"), or Chuckanuts, are located along the Washington state coast of the Salish Sea, just south of Bellingham, Washington. Part of the Cascade Range, they are the only place where the Cascades come west down to meet the sea. The Chuckanuts are considered to be a part of the Puget Lowland Forest Ecoregion.

The range contains Larrabee State Park, the first State Park to be designated in Washington (1923). Its mountains include:

- Anderson Mountain
- Blanchard Mountain
- Chuckanut Mountain (including North Chuckanut Mountain, South Chuckanut Mountain, and Chuckanut Ridge)
- Galbraith Mountain (also known as North Lookout Mountain)
- King Mountain
- Lookout Mountain
- Sehome Hill
- Squalicum Mountain
- Stewart Mountain
- Toad Mountain

== Geology ==
The Chuckanut Mountains were formed by the folding of the Chuckanut Formation (which is predominantly made up of layers of 55-million-year-old sandstone, conglomerate, shale, and bituminous and sub-bituminous coal) and the later Huntingdon Formation (predominantly shale and sandstone) on top, as well as an exposed section of pre-Jurassic-age phyllite. The Chuckanuts are well known for their Tertiary period leaf fossils.

In 1988, an outcrop of metamorphic phyllite, green chert, and milk quartz on Blanchard Mountain was exposed by a construction crew. The outcrop is unique for its unusually large chunks of stilpnomelane.
