= Larrabee State Park =

Protected area in Washington, United States

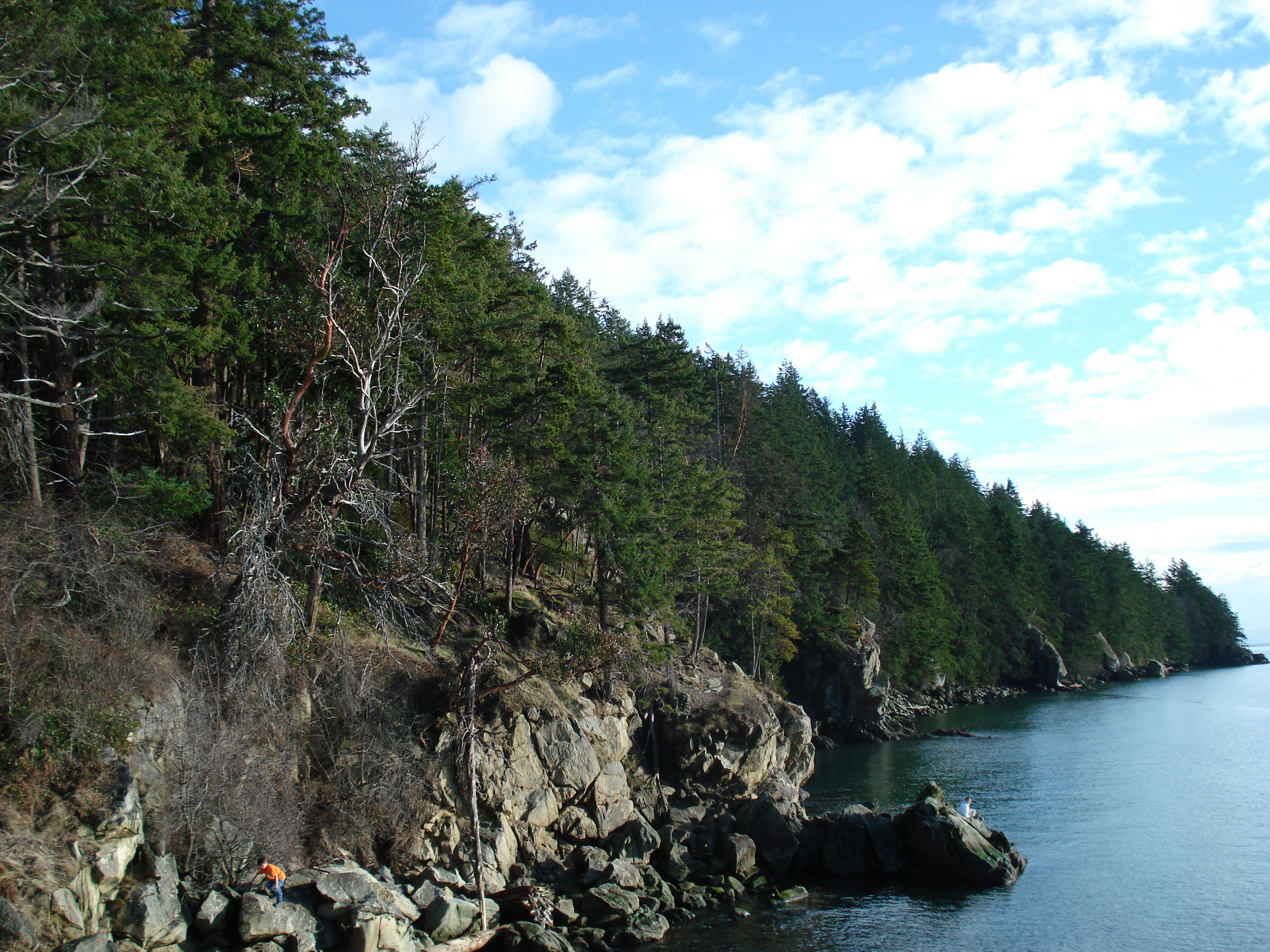
- Shore Pines (pinus contorta) and Douglas-Firs (pseudotsuga menzinii) on the coast.

- Location within Washington (state) Location within the United States
- Location: Whatcom County, Washington, United States
- Coordinates: 48°39′32″N 122°28′16″W
- Area: 2,748 acres (1,112 ha)
- Elevation: 1,034 ft (315 m)
- Established: 1915
- Administrator: Washington State Parks and Recreation Commission
- Visitors: 518,105 (in 2024)
- Named for: C.X. Larrabee
- Website: Official website

Larrabee State Park is a public recreation area located on Samish Bay on the western side of Chuckanut Mountain, 6 mi (9.7 km) south of the city of Bellingham, Washington. It was created in 1915 as Washington's first state park. The park covers 2,748 acres (1,112 ha) and features fishing, boating, and camping as well as mountain trails for hiking and biking. It is managed by the Washington State Parks and Recreation Commission.

== History ==
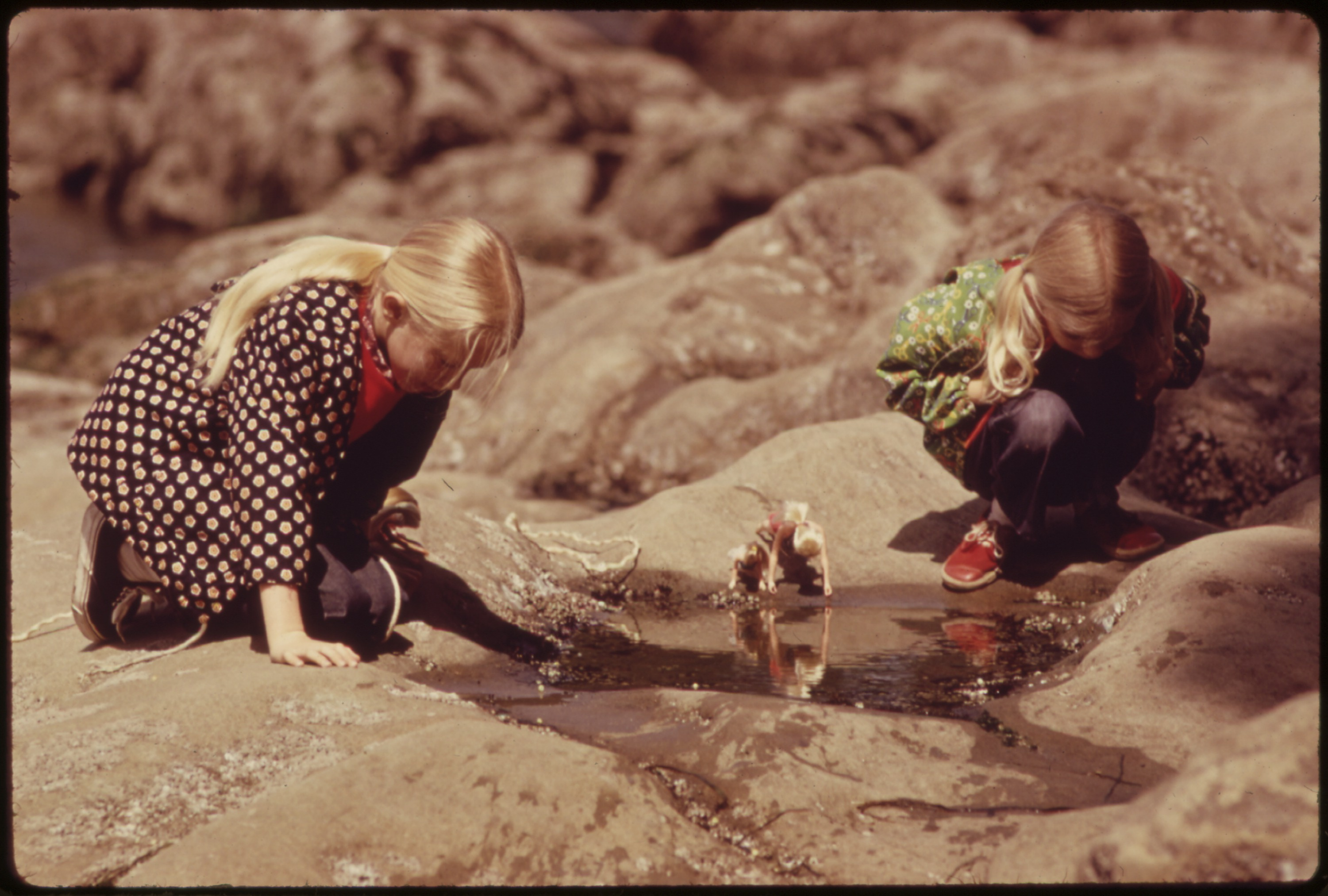
Pair of teenagers examine a tidepool at Larrabee State Park, May 1973

In 1913, the governor of Washington, Ernest Lister, proposed establishing a park along Chuckanut Drive. He mentioned this idea to Bellingham businessman Charles Larrabee, who agreed to deed waterfront property he owned in the area for the purpose. He died in 1914, but his wife Frances made sure the deal went through to completion. The governor officially accepted the park on October 23, 1915. On November 22, 1915, Washington State Board of Park Commissioners formally accepted it as well, thus making it the first state park in Washington. Initially called Chuckanut State Park, the park's name was changed to Larrabee in 1923.

The park began as a place mainly used for picnicking and to access the beach. After a series of relatively unsuccessful caretakers and trouble from the Great Depression, the park was experiencing low attendance by the early 1930s. Things began to turn around in 1935 under the leadership of manager Dave Johnson, who spearheaded the effort to improve the park, rallying local organizations, schools, churches, and businesses to increase use of the park. In 1936, the Works Progress Administration provided US$30,000 in federal funding, leading to improvements such as playground equipment, a water system, and kitchen shelters.

The Larrabee family donated another 1500 acres in 1937, with neighboring landowners making additional contributions. Further developments were made, and the park continued to attract visitors, reaching a quarter million annual visitors by 1965.

== Activities and amenities ==
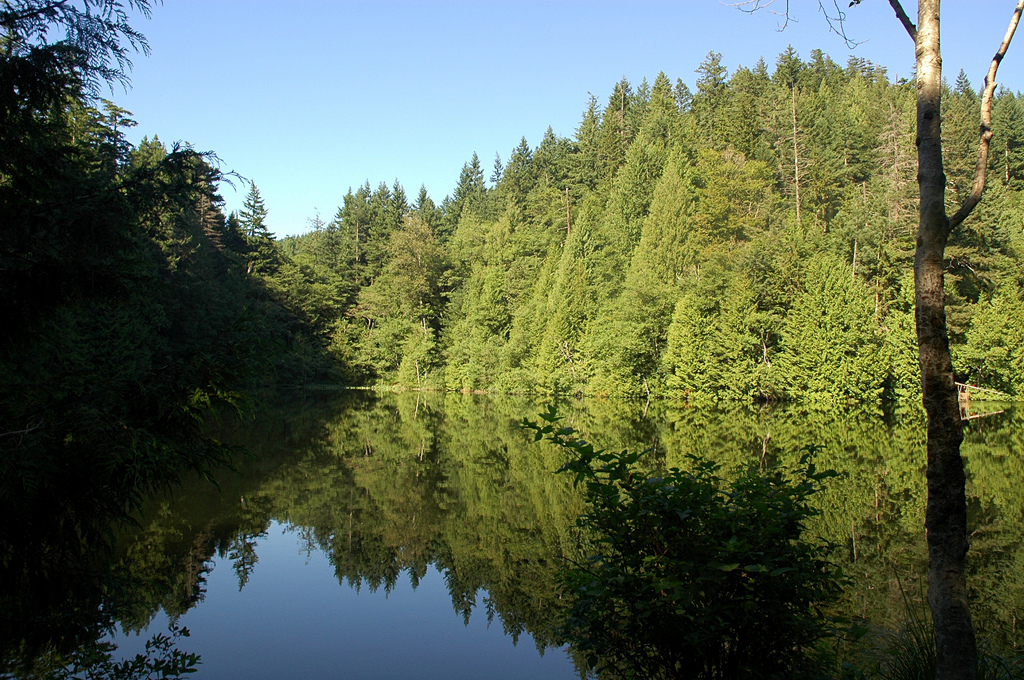
Fragrance Lake on Chuckanut Mountain

There are 13 mi (21 km) of biking trails and 15 mi (24 km) of hiking trails, including trails leading 1,940 ft (590 m) up Chuckanut Mountain. Picnicking, boating, saltwater fishing, sailboarding, and beachcombing along 8,100 ft (2,500 m) of saltwater shoreline are among the other recreational options. Two mountain lakes, Fragrance Lake and Lost Lake, offer freshwater fishing for hikers. The park also includes camping sites, an amphitheater, and large fields.

The park featured a short walk down to Clayton Beach but it was technically an informal trail that crossed over a blind-curve railroad track. It had been closed for several years. In 2023 an official trail, measuring 1.0-mile (1.6 km), was opened by the Washington State Parks system and was begun in part due to funding of $3.0 million from the state's Recreation and Conservation Office. The path begins at Lost Lake Trailhead and includes a fenced pedestrian bridge that crosses over the tracks.

=== Clayton Beach ===
Clayton Beach is accessible from Larrabee State Park via a one-mile trail. The beach was part of the parcel donated in 1937 by the Larrabee family. The area provides views of Samish Bay and the San Juan Islands and contains sandstone formations and tidepools. The beach, at low-tide, extends for 1.0-mile (1.6 km).

In the 1960s, the beach became a secluded spot for nude swimming. Tolerated by the park until 1990s, the unofficial nudist beach began to wane after the Washington State Department Parks and Recreation denied to formally recognize the nude beach.
