= Washington State Route 170 (1965–1967) =

Former state highway in Washington, United States

State Route 170

Route information
- Auxiliary route of SR 17
- Maintained by WSDOT
- Length: 15.8 mi (25.4 km)
- Existed: 1965–1967

Major junctions
- West end: Ringold
- East end: SR 17 in Mesa

Location
- Country: United States
- State: Washington

Highway system
- State highways in Washington; Interstate; US; State; Scenic; Pre-1964; 1964 renumbering; Former

State Route 170 was a state route in the U.S. state of Washington. It was an auxiliary route of SR 17. It started at SR 17 in Mesa, then headed west to Ringold, where it ended.

== Route description ==
From 1964 until 1970, SR 170 began at Ringold Road near the Columbia River southwest of Basin City. From Ringold Road, the roadway traveled northeast into Basin City and then left east to end at SR 17 north of its southern terminus at U.S. Route 395 (US 395) in Mesa; the current road is named Road 170.

== History ==
The former route of SR 170 first appeared on a map in 1926, when Rand McNally published a road map of Washington, including a road extending from Hanford to Mesa. That road would later become a section of Secondary State Highway 11A (SSH 11A) in 1937, which ran from Yakima to Connell. In 1953, SSH 11A was relocated due to the development of the Hanford Site and the Hanford–Mesa route became the Ringold branch. Although the roadway was on a map by 1926, the road wasn't finished until after 1963; one year later in 1964, the highway became SR 170, which was later moved to another route near Warden in 1970.

== Major intersections ==
The entire highway was in Franklin County.

Location	mi	km	Destinations	Notes
	0.0	0.0	Ringold River Road	Western terminus
Basin City	7.5	12.1	Sagehill Road	
Mesa	15.8	25.4	SR 17	Eastern terminus
1.000 mi = 1.609 km; 1.000 km = 0.621 mi
