= Washington State Route 170 =

State highway in Grant County, Washington, US

State Route 170

- SR 170 highlighted in red

Route information
- Auxiliary route of SR 17
- Maintained by WSDOT
- Length: 3.68 mi (5.92 km)
- Existed: 1970–present

Major junctions
- West end: SR 17 near Warden
- East end: South Main Avenue in Warden

Location
- Country: United States
- State: Washington
- Counties: Grant

Highway system
- State highways in Washington; Interstate; US; State; Scenic; Pre-1964; 1964 renumbering; Former
← SR 169	→ SR 171

State Route 170 (SR 170) is a short, 3.68-mile (5.92 km) long state highway located within Grant County in the U.S. state of Washington. The highway begins at SR 17 west of Warden and travels east to end at Main Avenue in Warden. The current route of the highway was first established in 1967 as Secondary State Highway 11I (SSH 11I) and became SR 170 in 1970 after it was moved north of its previous route, which had been on maps since 1926, named SSH 11A in 1937 and renumbered to SR 170 in 1964. The old route ran from the Columbia River southwest of Basin City to SR 17 north of Mesa.

== Route description ==
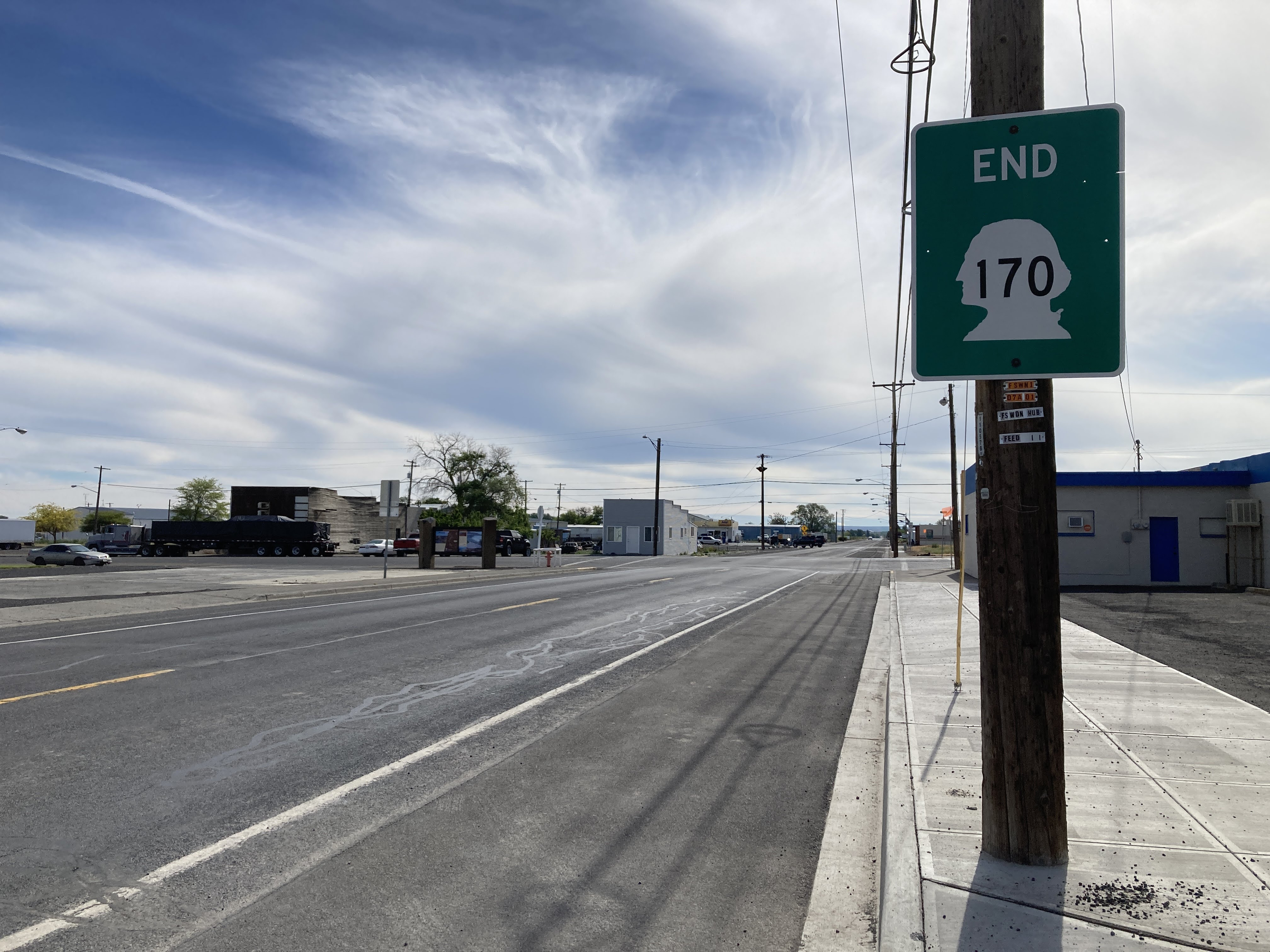
The eastern terminus of State Route 170 in Warden

State Route 170 (SR 170) begins at SR 17 west of Warden and south of the SR 17 and SR 262 intersection. From SR 17, the highway travels east to cross two pairs of railroad tracks owned by Columbia Basin Railroad, which go south to Connell and north to Moses Lake, to enter Warden. Once the roadway enters Warden, it is named 1st Street and later ends at Main Avenue. The busiest segment of the road in terms of vehicle counts was between SR 17 and Warden, with a daily average of 2,800 motorists in 2007; the busiest segment in 1970 was at Main Avenue, with a daily average of 2,100 motorists.

== History ==
In 1967, SSH 11I was established on a short route near Warden. The highway became SR 170 in 1970 after it was moved from another route located southwest of Warden. The western railroad crossing was first operated by Northern Pacific Railway while the eastern crossing was operated by the Chicago, Milwaukee, St. Paul and Pacific Railroad in 1963. By 1981, BNSF Railway owned both crossings and as of 2009, the Columbia Basin Railroad operates both.

== Major intersections ==
The entire route is in Grant County.

Location	mi	km	Destinations	Notes
	0.00	0.00	SR 17 – Mesa, Othello, Moses Lake	
Warden	3.68	5.92	South Main Avenue	
1.000 mi = 1.609 km; 1.000 km = 0.621 mi
