= Washington State Route 173 =

State highway in central Washington, US

State Route 173

- SR 173 highlighted in red

Route information
- Auxiliary route of SR 17
- Maintained by WSDOT
- Length: 11.86 mi (19.09 km)
- Existed: 1964–present

Major junctions
- South end: SR 17 in Bridgeport
- North end: US 97 in Brewster

Location
- Country: United States
- State: Washington
- Counties: Douglas, Okanogan

Highway system
- State highways in Washington; Interstate; US; State; Scenic; Pre-1964; 1964 renumbering; Former
← SR 172	→ SR 174

State Route 173 (SR 173) is an 11.86-mile-long (19.09 km) state highway serving Douglas and Okanogan counties in the U.S. state of Washington. The highway travels northwest along the Columbia River from SR 17 in Bridgeport to U.S. Route 97 (US 97) in Brewster. It serves as an alternate route to SR 17, which travels north of the Columbia River, and serves the Chief Joseph State Park and the Bridgeport Bar State Wildlife Recreation Area. SR 173 was established during the 1964 highway renumbering and codified in 1970, but it has been a part of the state highway system since 1931 as a branch of State Road 10, later Primary State Highway 10 (PSH 10). The highway crosses the Columbia River on the Brewster Bridge, which originally opened in 1928 and was destroyed in 1967 before being re-built a decade later.

== Route description ==
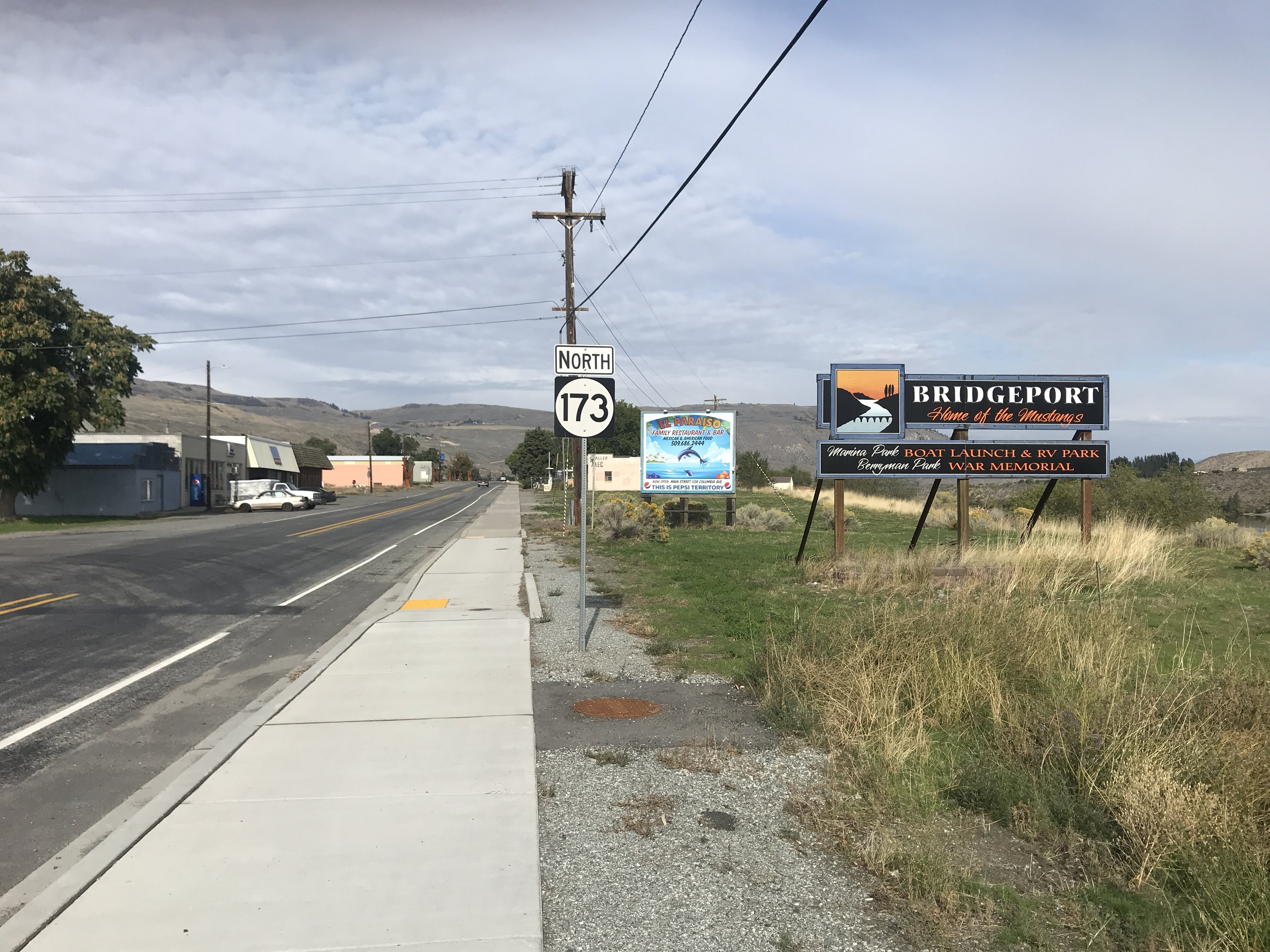
Looking northbound on SR 173 in Bridgeport

SR 173 begins at an intersection with SR 17 southwest of the Bridgeport Bridge in Bridgeport, a city in rural Douglas County. The two-lane street travels northwest through Bridgeport as Foster Creek Avenue and turns northeast onto 17th Avenue and later northwest as Columbia Avenue to Bridgeport Park, where SR 173 turns southwest onto 10th Street and Maple Street to leave the city. The highway turns northwest, following the Columbia River towards Chief Joseph State Park. SR 173 continues west, forming the southern boundary of the Bridgeport Bar State Wildlife Recreation Area before crossing the Columbia River into Okanogan County on the Brewster Bridge. The highway enters Brewster and becomes Bridge Street, traveling north over Swamp Creek to end at an intersection with US 97.

Every year, the Washington State Department of Transportation (WSDOT) conducts a series of surveys on its highways in the state to measure traffic volume. This is expressed in terms of annual average daily traffic (AADT), which is a measure of traffic volume for any average day of the year. In 2011, WSDOT calculated that between 970 and 3,400 vehicles per day used the highway, mostly in Brewster.

== History ==
SR 173 follows the route of wagon roads built in the late 19th century between Brewster Ferry and Bridgeport Ferry on the east side of the Columbia River. The Brewster Bridge was completed in June 1928 and the roadway was first codified in 1931 as part of a State Road 10 branch that connected Brewster to Coulee City. State Road 10 became PSH 10 and retained the branch during the creation of the primary and secondary state highway system in 1937 as the state purchased the Brewster Bridge. The branch was moved to the west side of the Columbia River, located north of Bridgeport, in 1951 and a new branch between Bridgeport and Brewster was created to continue maintenance of the paved highway. During the 1964 highway renumbering, SR 173 was established on the route of the PSH 10 branch between Bridgeport and Brewster, later re-aligned into a straighter highway and codified in 1970. The Brewster Bridge later was destroyed in a fire in August 1967, being replaced by a 15-minute ferry until the new span was opened in the 1970s. No major revisions to the route of the highway have occurred since 1970, however the state tried unsuccessfully to transfer ownership of SR 173 and the Brewster Bridge in 1986.

== Major intersections ==
County	Location	mi	km	Destinations	Notes
Douglas	Bridgeport	0.00	0.00	SR 17 – Okanogan, Grand Coulee Dam	Southern terminus
Okanogan	Brewster	11.86	19.09	US 97 – Wenatchee, Okanogan	Northern terminus
1.000 mi = 1.609 km; 1.000 km = 0.621 mi
