= Washington State Route 172 =

State highway in Douglas County, Washington, US

State Route 172

- SR 172 highlighted in red

Route information
- Auxiliary route of SR 17
- Maintained by WSDOT
- Length: 35.01 mi (56.34 km)
- Existed: 1964–present

Major junctions
- West end: US 2 near Waterville
- East end: SR 17 near Leahy

Location
- Country: United States
- State: Washington
- Counties: Douglas

Highway system
- State highways in Washington; Interstate; US; State; Scenic; Pre-1964; 1964 renumbering; Former
← SR 171	→ SR 173

State Route 172 (SR 172) is a 35.01-mile (56.34 km) long state highway serving rural Douglas County in the U.S. state of Washington. The highway travels north from U.S. Route 2 (US 2) near Waterville through Withrow and east through Mansfield before ending at SR 17 at Sims Corner. The highway follows the route of a county road built in the 1930s and signed as Secondary State Highway 10B (SSH 10B) in 1955. SSH 10B became SR 172 during the 1964 highway renumbering and served a daily average of less than 700 vehicles in 2011.

== Route description ==
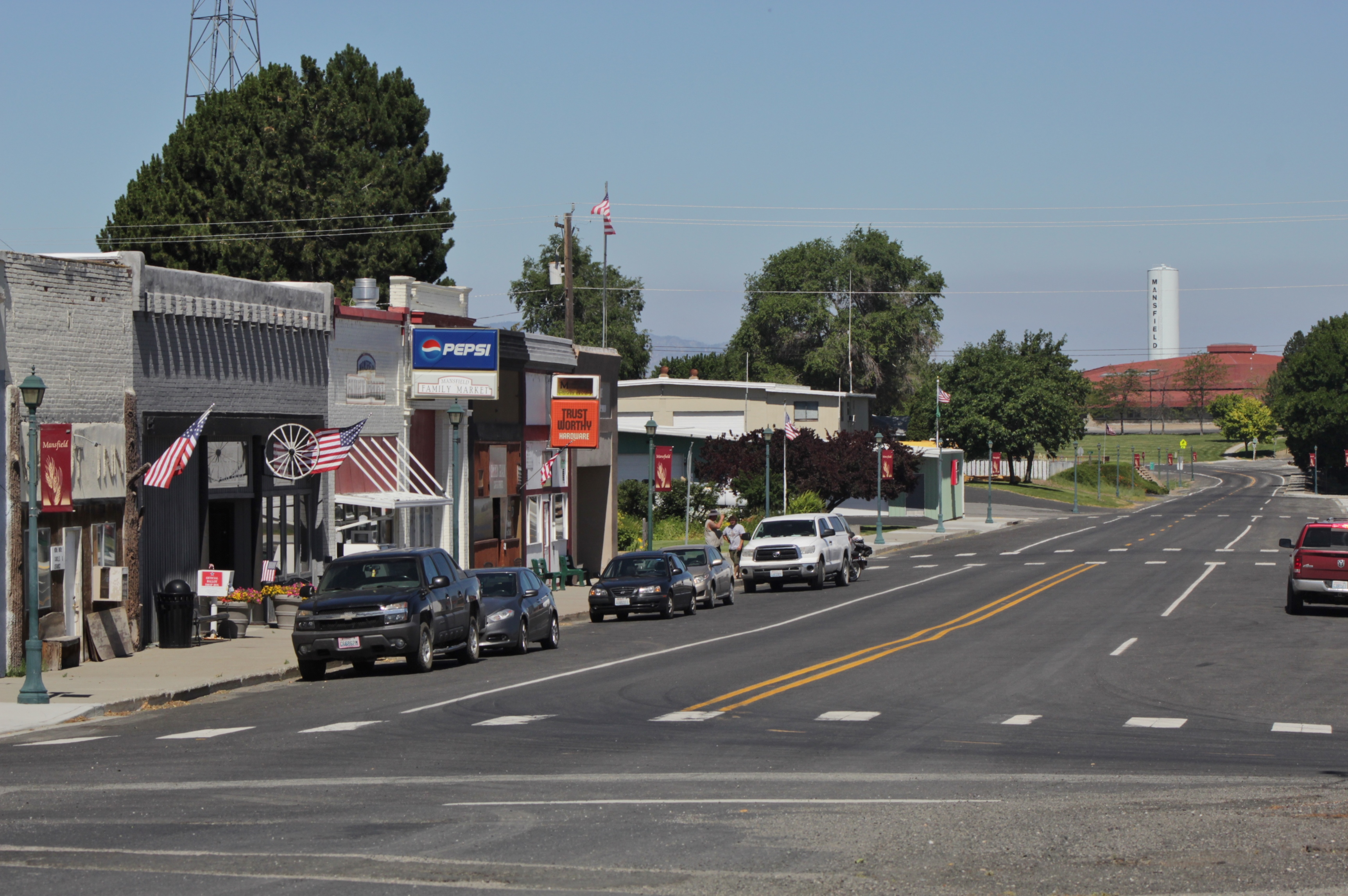
SR 172 passing through Mansfield as Main Street

SR 172 begins as Road C NW at an intersection with US 2 at the unincorporated community of Farmer, between Waterville and Coulee City. The highway travels north through farmland and serves Withrow before climbing Lone Butte and turning east into 14th Road NW. SR 172 continues east into Mansfield, where it becomes Main Street and turns southeast into Downtown at Mansfield High School. The roadway turns northeast onto Railroad Avenue, serving the Mansfield Airport. SR 172 leaves Mansfield and continues east as 14th Road NE until it ends at SR 17 at Sims Corner, between Coulee City and Leahy.

Every year the Washington State Department of Transportation (WSDOT) conducts a series of surveys on its highways in the state to measure traffic volume. This is expressed in terms of annual average daily traffic (AADT), which is a measure of traffic volume for any average day of the year. In 2011, WSDOT calculated that between 200 and 690 vehicles per day used the highway, mostly in Mansfield.

== History ==
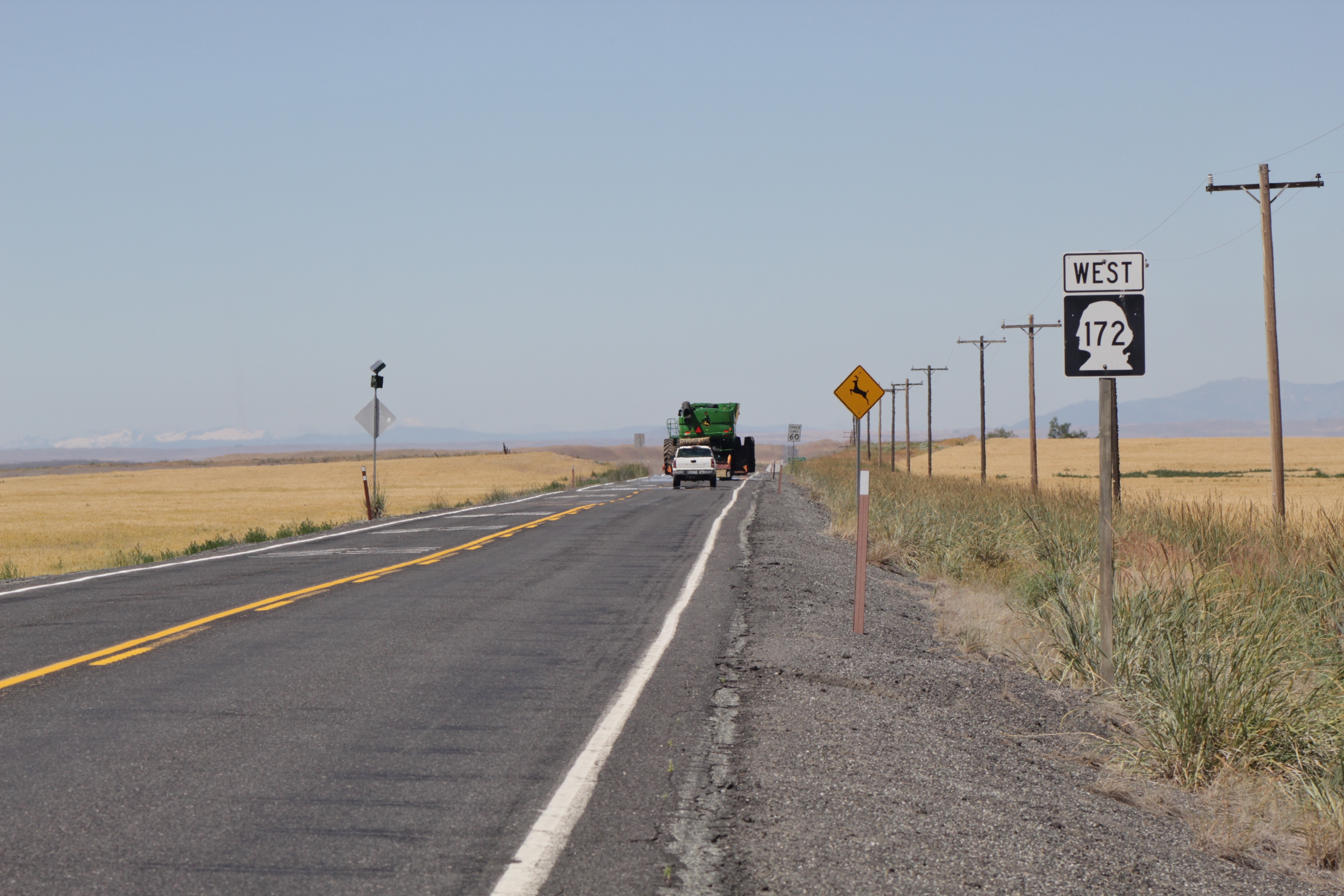
SR 172 westbound at SR 17

A gravel county road extending from Lone Butte through Mansfield to Sims Corner first appeared in a 1933 Department of Highways map of Washington. The road was paved and used temporarily by Primary State Highway 10 (PSH 10) until a Bridgeport–Leahy road was built to the northeast in the 1950s. A paved road from Mansfield to Withrow and Farmer was built by 1950 and was signed as an extension of Secondary State Highway 10B (SSH 10B) in 1955. SSH 11B was split into SR 172 and SR 174 in the 1964 highway renumbering.

== Major intersections ==
The entire highway is in Douglas County.

Location	mi	km	Destinations	Notes
	0.00	0.00	US 2 – Coulee City, Waterville	Western terminus
	35.01	56.34	SR 17 – Coulee City, Bridgeport, Grand Coulee Dam	Eastern terminus
1.000 mi = 1.609 km; 1.000 km = 0.621 mi
