= Washington State Route 174 =

State highway in central Washington, US

State Route 174

- The Grand Coulee Dam area with SR 174 in red.

Route information
- Auxiliary route of SR 17
- Maintained by WSDOT
- Length: 40.66 mi (65.44 km)
- Existed: 1964–present

Major junctions
- West end: SR 17 in Leahy
- SR 155 in Grand Coulee
- East end: SR 21 near Wilbur

Location
- Country: United States
- State: Washington
- Counties: Douglas, Grant, Lincoln

Highway system
- State highways in Washington; Interstate; US; State; Scenic; Pre-1964; 1964 renumbering; Former
| ← SR 173 | → SR 181 |

State Route 174 (SR 174) is a 40.66-mile (65.44 km) long state highway that traverses Douglas, Grant and Lincoln counties in Washington. SR 174 begins at a junction with SR 17 in Leahy and travels eastward to Grand Coulee, near the Grand Coulee Dam, to intersect SR 155. From Grand Coulee, the roadway travels southeast to end at SR 21 northwest of Wilbur.

Prior to the establishment of SR 174 in a 1964 renumbering, it had been county roads and two highways, Secondary State Highway 10B (SSH 10B) and Secondary State Highway 4C (SSH 4C) from 1937 until 1964. The two highways merged to form SR 174 in 1964 and a branch of SSH 10B became the Crown Point spur of SR 174. A second spur route, located in Leahy, was added in 2009.

== Route description ==
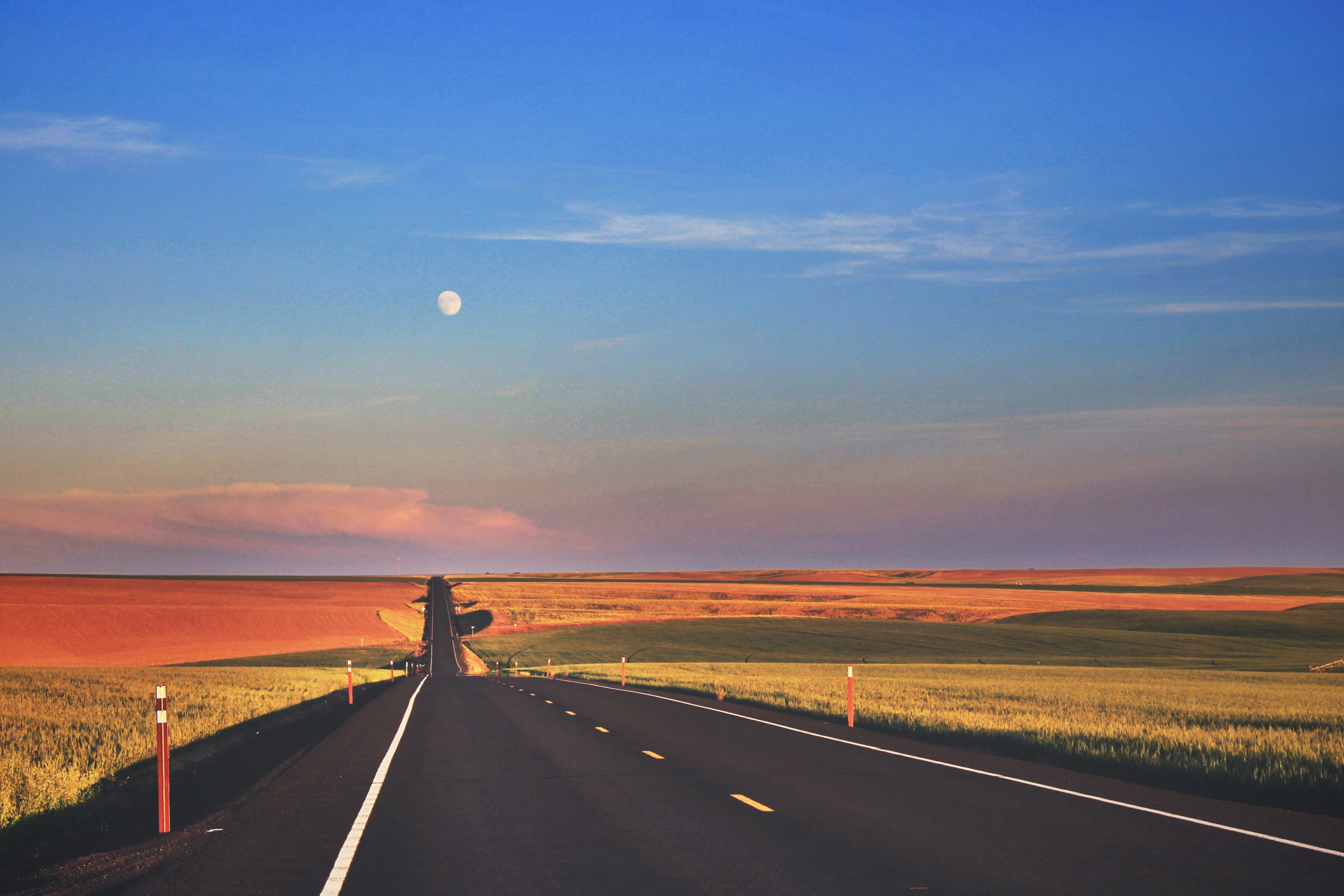
Washington State Route 174

SR 174 begins at an intersection with SR 17 in Leahy, a small community in Douglas County. The western terminus is only accessible from SR 17 southbound, access from SR 17 northbound is provided by the Leahy spur of SR 174. From Leahy, the highway travels northeastward through grasslands with few farms before turning southeast to intersect its Crown Point spur near the Grand Coulee Dam. The roadway then enters Grant County and the city of Grand Coulee and becomes the Bridgeport Highway. SR 174 continues to the Grand Coulee Dam federal reservation and state maintenance ends through the area. After the gap in maintenance in Grand Coulee, SR 174 travels over the Columbia Basin Canal and intersects with SR 155, which is named Midway Avenue through Grand Coulee. After the intersection, the highway is named Grand Coulee Avenue and passes Grand Coulee Middle School and Skilskin High School before leaving the city and the county. The roadway enters Lincoln County and continues southeast to its eastern terminus, an intersection with SR 21, northwest of Wilbur; SR 21 continues south to intersect with U.S. Route 2 (US 2).

== History ==
Secondary State Highway 10B and Secondary State Highway 4C made up the route of SR 174 prior to 1964.

SR 174 had previously been parts of various county roads until 1937, when Washington established a system of primary and secondary highways throughout the state. One of the secondary highways, Secondary State Highway 10B (SSH 10B) ran from Primary State Highway 10 (PSH 10) in Bridgeport to Coulee Dam, near the Grand Coulee Dam that was built in 1942. It was planned in conjunction with the dam project in the late 1930s and began construction in 1939. Another secondary highway, Secondary State Highway 4C (SSH 4C) ran from Grand Coulee to PSH 4 near Wilbur. In 1951, the western terminus SSH 10B was moved from Bridgeport to PSH 10 in Leahy and a western portion from PSH 2 in Farmer to PSH 10 in Mansfield. A branch of SSH 10B from its main route to the Crown Point viewing area of the Grand Coulee Dam was added in 1955. SR 174 was formed after a 1964 renumbering of Washington state highways, eliminating the previous Primary and secondary highway system. SSH 10B and SSH 4C were connected to become the new highway and the renumbering went into effect in 1970. In 2009, a second spur in Leahy was established and added to the state highway system.

== Major intersections ==
| County | Location | mi | km | Destinations | Notes |
|---|---|---|---|---|---|
| Douglas | | 0.00 | 0.00 | SR 17 north – Bridgeport, Chief Joseph Dam | Western terminus, at-grade intersection |
| Douglas | | 0.14 | 0.23 | SR 174 Spur south to SR 17 south – Coulee City | |
| Douglas | Coulee Dam | 19.55 | 31.46 | SR 174 Spur east | |
| Grant | Grand Coulee | 21.49 | 34.58 | SR 155 (Midway Avenue) – Electric City, Coulee Dam | |
| Lincoln | Wilbur | 40.66 | 65.44 | SR 21 – Keller, Republic | Eastern terminus, at-grade intersection |
1.000 mi = 1.609 km; 1.000 km = 0.621 mi

== Spur routes ==
State Route 174 (SR 174) has two spur routes, a type of special route.

=== Leahy spur ===
Leahy spur
- Location: Leahy, Washington
- Existed: 2009–present

The Leahy spur of SR 174 is a 0.09-mile (0.14 km) long two-lane spur route that was added to the state highway system in 2009. The roadway is named Leahy Road and serves as a connector from northbound SR 17 to SR 174.

=== Crown Point spur ===
Crown Point spur
- Location: Crown Point, Washington
- Existed: 1964–present

The older spur route is located near the Grand Coulee Dam and connects SR 174 to Crown Point State Park, part of the Lake Roosevelt National Recreation Area, within the community of Coulee Dam. The highway, named Crown Point Road, is 1.37 miles (2.20 km) long and was added in 1964. The Crown Point Spur was a spur route of SSH 10B, established in 1955, prior to 1964. The roadway itself is within federal property and is not numbered or maintained by the state.
