= Washington State Route 17 =

State highway in central Washington, US

State Route 17
- SR 17 highlighted in red

Route information
- Maintained by WSDOT
- Length: 136.67 mi (219.95 km)
- Existed: 1964–present
- Tourist routes: Coulee Corridor Scenic Byway

Major junctions
- South end: US 395 in Mesa
- SR 26 in Othello; I-90 in Moses Lake; SR 28 in Soap Lake; US 2 near Coulee City
- North end: US 97 near Brewster

Location
- Country: United States
- State: Washington
- Counties: Franklin, Adams, Grant, Douglas, Okanogan

Highway system
- State highways in Washington; Interstate; US; State; Scenic; Pre-1964; 1964 renumbering; Former
← SR 16	→ SR 18

State Route 17 (SR 17) is a 136.67-mile-long (219.95 km) state highway serving the Columbia Plateau in the central region of the U.S. state of Washington. The highway travels through mostly rural areas of Franklin. Adams, Grant, Douglas, and Okanogan counties and is designated as part of the National Highway System between Mesa and Moses Lake and as the Coulee Corridor Scenic Byway between Othello and Coulee City for passing through the Grand Coulee. SR 17 begins in Mesa at an interchange with U.S. Route 395 (US 395) and travels north and intersects SR 26 near Othello before entering Moses Lake, where the highway intersects Interstate 90 (I-90) and travels as a partial expressway. SR 17 continues north, intersecting SR 28 in Soap Lake, through the Grand Coulee to a short concurrency with US 2 west of Coulee City. The highway turns northwest and crosses the Columbia River on the Columbia River Bridge at Bridgeport before ending at US 97 in Brewster at the southwestern edge of the Colville Indian Reservation.

SR 17 was established during the merger of three highways during the 1964 highway renumbering: Secondary State Highway 11G (SSH 11G) between Eltopia and Soap Lake, a branch of Primary State Highway 7 (PSH 7) between Soap Lake and Coulee City, and a branch of PSH 10 between Coulee City and Brewster. The PSH 10 branch was codified in 1931 as a branch of State Road 10 and was followed by the PSH 7 branch during the creation of the primary state highway system in 1937. The Columbia River Bridge at Bridgeport was completed in 1950 and the PSH 10 branch was re-aligned onto the north side of the Columbia River the following year. SSH 11G was created in 1951 and was moved to a wider, straighter route between Moses Lake and Soap Lake in the 1960s. The highway was replaced by a limited-access highway north of Moses Lake in 2007. SR 17 between Eltopia and Mesa was replaced by US 395 in 1979 as part of a larger series of projects in the area to improve the highway in Franklin County.

== Route description ==
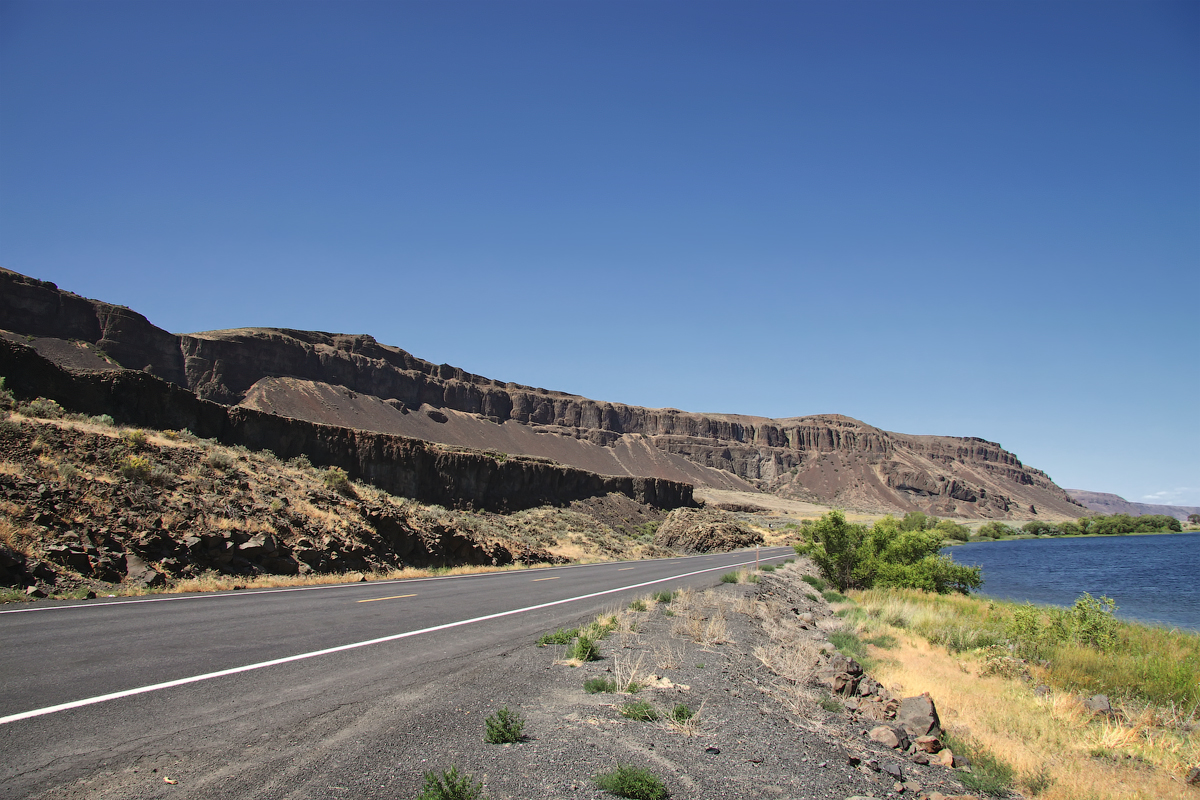
SR 17 northbound on the western shore of Alkali Lake in the Grand Coulee, heading towards Coulee City.

SR 17 begins at a diamond interchange with US 395 southeast of Mesa in Franklin County. The highway travels northwest through Mesa, where it crosses over a BNSF rail line and runs through Esquatzel Coulee before intersecting the terminus of SR 260 west of Connell in the Paradise Flats. SR 17 travels east of Scooteney Reservoir and northwest into Adams County before intersecting SR 26 in a diamond interchange east of Othello. The highway continues north into Grant County as the Coulee Corridor Scenic Byway and travels over the Columbia Basin Railroad into rural Adams County. The roadway serves as the western terminus of SR 170 and the eastern terminus of SR 262 west of Warden before continuing northwest towards Moses Lake.

SR 17 travels into the city of Moses Lake and intersects I-90 in a partial cloverleaf interchange, serving as the eastern terminus of I-90 Business and its concurrency with SR 17. The roadway expands to four lanes and turns north at Pioneer Way, where I-90 Business leaves the concurrency and travels into Downtown Moses Lake. SR 17 heads around Moses Lake and turn northwest onto a limited-access highway after an intersection with Broadway Avenue, signed as the northern terminus of SR 171. The limited-access highway intersects Stratford Road in a diamond interchange north of the city and heads northwest along Moses Lake through Moses Lake North, passing south of Grant County International Airport. SR 17 crosses Rocky Ford Creek and intersects SR 282 east of Ephrata in rural Grant County. The highway continues north and passes Ephrata Municipal Airport before it intersects SR 28 in Soap Lake.

SR 17 and the Coulee Corridor Scenic Byway continue northwest through the Grand Coulee and passing several lakes, including Soap Lake, Lake Lenore and Alkali Lake. The highway turns northeast onto the west shores of Blue Lake and Park Lake, and passes the Blue Lake rest area. The roadway enters Sun Lakes State Park and passes Dry Falls at the north end of the Grand Coulee. SR 17 intersects US 2, the continuation of the Coulee Corridor Scenic Byway, west of Coulee City at the southern end of Banks Lake and begins a concurrency into Douglas County. SR 17 briefly travels west with US 2 and turns north to intersect the eastern terminus of SR 172 at Sims Corner. From Sims Corner, the roadway follows East Foster Creek northward to the western terminus of SR 174 and its spur route in Leahy.

The highway continues northwest to Bridgeport at the southern terminus of SR 173 and crossing the Columbia River on the 1,108.80-foot-long (337.96 m) Columbia River Bridge (also named the Bridgeport Bridge) downstream from the Chief Joseph Dam. The steel continuous riveted deck truss bridge, listed on the National Register of Historic Places, carries SR 17 into Okanogan County and the Colville Indian Reservation, west of Bridgeport State Park. The highway continues north along the east bank of the Columbia River before passing through Fort Okanogan and ending at an intersection with US 97 east of Brewster near the confluence of the Columbia and Okanogan rivers.

Every year, the Washington State Department of Transportation (WSDOT) conducts a series of surveys on its highways in the state to measure traffic volume. This is expressed in terms of annual average daily traffic (AADT), which is a measure of traffic volume for any average day of the year. In 2011, WSDOT calculated that the busiest section of the highway was the expressway between SR 171 and Stratford Road in Moses Lake, serving an average of 19,000 vehicles, while the least busiest section of the highway was between SR 172 in Sims Corner and SR 174 in Leahy, serving an average of 570 vehicles. SR 17 between Mesa and the Moses Lake area is designated as part of the National Highway System, which includes roadways important to the national economy, defense, and mobility; and as part of WSDOT's Highways of Statewide Significance, which includes highways that connect major communities in the state of Washington.

== History ==
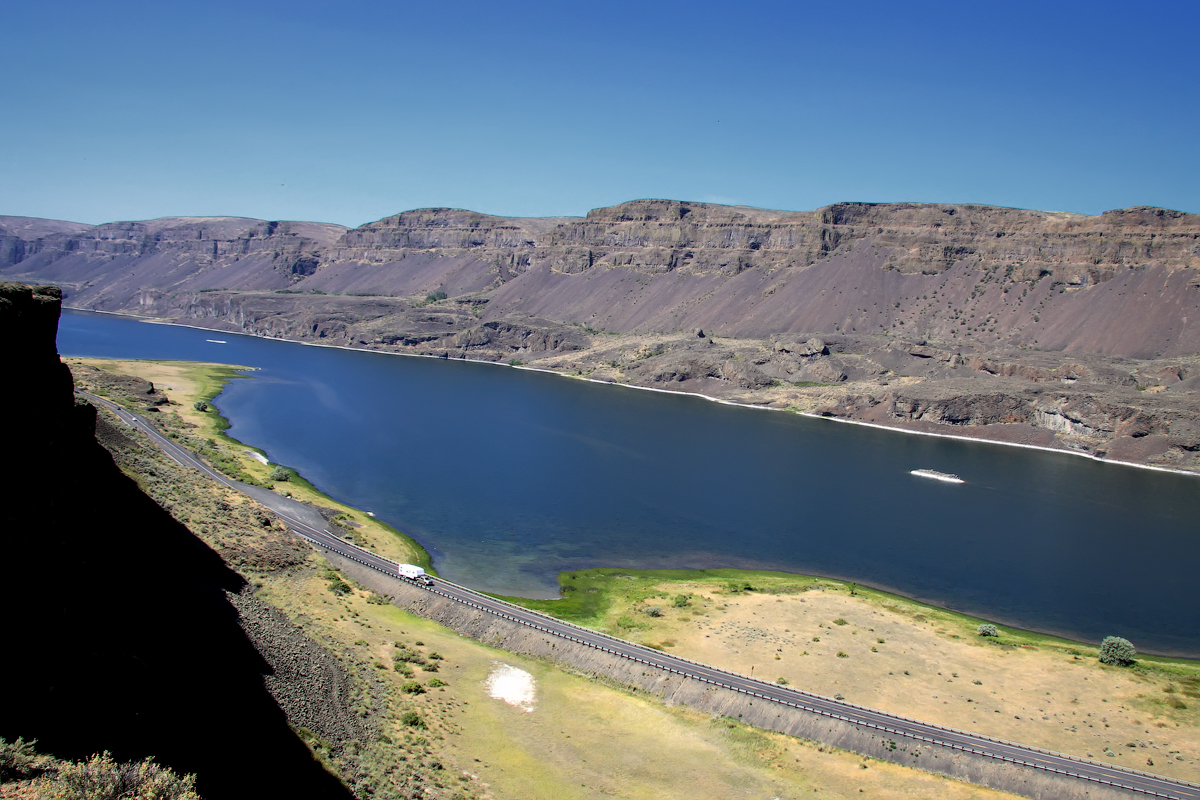
SR 17 on the shores of Lake Lenore, passing through the Grand Coulee on a highway built in the 1930s.

SR 17 was established during the 1964 highway renumbering as the successor to three highways that were designated under the primary and secondary state highway system: SSH 11G from US 395 and PSH 11 in Eltopia to PSH 7 in Soap Lake, a branch of PSH 7 from Soap Lake to US 2 and PSH 2 west of Coulee City, and a branch of PSH 10 from Coulee City to US 97 and PSH 10 east of Brewster. The Coulee City–Brewster branch of PSH 10 was codified in 1931 as a branch of State Road 10 and re-codified in 1937, during the creation of the primary and secondary state highways; however, the highway was not built between Sims Corner and Bridgeport until the 1950s. The Soap Lake–Coulee City branch of PSH 7 was established in 1937 to serve as an alternate route to SSH 2F, avoiding the Grand Coulee Dam. In 1951, the PSH 10 branch between Bridgeport and Brewster was moved north of the Columbia River via the newly built Columbia River Bridge on the present route of SR 17, as the old route through Bridgeport and over the Brewster Bridge became a new branch that was later signed in 1964 as SR 173. SSH 11G was also created in 1951, traveling north from US 395 in Eltopia through Mesa and Moses Lake to Soap Lake along existing gravel roads from the late 1930s, later straightened and widened in the 1970s.

SR 17 was originally a 144.27-mile-long (232.18 km) highway, extending south from Mesa to Eltopia when it was created in 1964 and codified in 1970, but was shortened by 7.60 miles (12.23 km) to its current route after US 395 was re-aligned between Eltopia and Connell. The new alignment, part of improvements to SR 17 in the Mesa area in the late 1960s, was approved in 1968 and opened in late 1979. No major revisions to the route of SR 17 have occurred since 1979, as WSDOT has improved the sections of the highway through widening and barriers. Within Moses Lake, the two-lane highway was designated to be widened to a four-lane limited-access highway between Pioneer Way and Stratford Road in 1997 and completed a decade later on October 8, 2007. The highway between SR 26 in Othello to US 2 west of Coulee City was designated as the Coulee Corridor Scenic Byway under the Washington State Scenic and Recreational Highways program in 1967 and under the National Scenic Byway program on September 22, 2005.

== Major intersections ==
County	Location	mi	km	Destinations	Notes
Franklin	Mesa	0.00– 0.12	0.00– 0.19	US 395 – Pasco, Spokane	Southern terminus; interchange
Franklin		7.20	11.59	SR 260 east – Connell, Washtucna	
Adams		20.31– 21.37	32.69– 34.39	SR 26 to US 395 / SR 24 – Othello, Vantage, Yakima	Interchange
Grant		32.28	51.95	SR 170 east – Warden	
Grant		33.29	53.58	SR 262 west (O'Sullivan Dam Road)	
Grant	Moses Lake	43.18– 43.35	69.49– 69.77	I-90 – Seattle, Spokane	South end of I-90 Bus. overlap; interchange
Grant	Moses Lake	44.26	71.23	I-90 BL west (Pioneer Way) – City Center	North end of I-90 Bus. overlap
Grant	Moses Lake	46.40	74.67	SR 171 south (Broadway Avenue)	
Grant	Moses Lake	47.03– 47.60	75.69– 76.60	Stratford Road – Moses Lake	Interchange
Grant		60.13	96.77	SR 282 west – Ephrata	
Grant	Soap Lake	67.76	109.05	SR 28 – Ephrata, Spokane	
Grant		89.06	143.33	US 2 east to SR 155 – Grand Coulee Dam, Spokane	South end of US 2 overlap
Douglas		90.68	145.94	US 2 west – Wenatchee	North end of US 2 overlap
Douglas		104.60	168.34	SR 172 west – Mansfield	
Douglas		112.07	180.36	SR 174 Spur north to SR 174 east – Grand Coulee Dam	
Douglas		112.24	180.63	SR 174 east – Grand Coulee Dam	
Douglas	Bridgeport	128.22	206.35	SR 173 north – Bridgeport, Brewster	
Columbia River		128.30– 128.51	206.48– 206.82	Columbia River Bridge	
Okanogan		136.67	219.95	US 97 – Brewster, Wenatchee, Okanogan, Penticton	Northern terminus
1.000 mi = 1.609 km; 1.000 km = 0.621 mi: Concurrency terminus
