= Lake Lenore (Washington) =

Lake in Grant County, Washington, U.S.

Lenore Lake
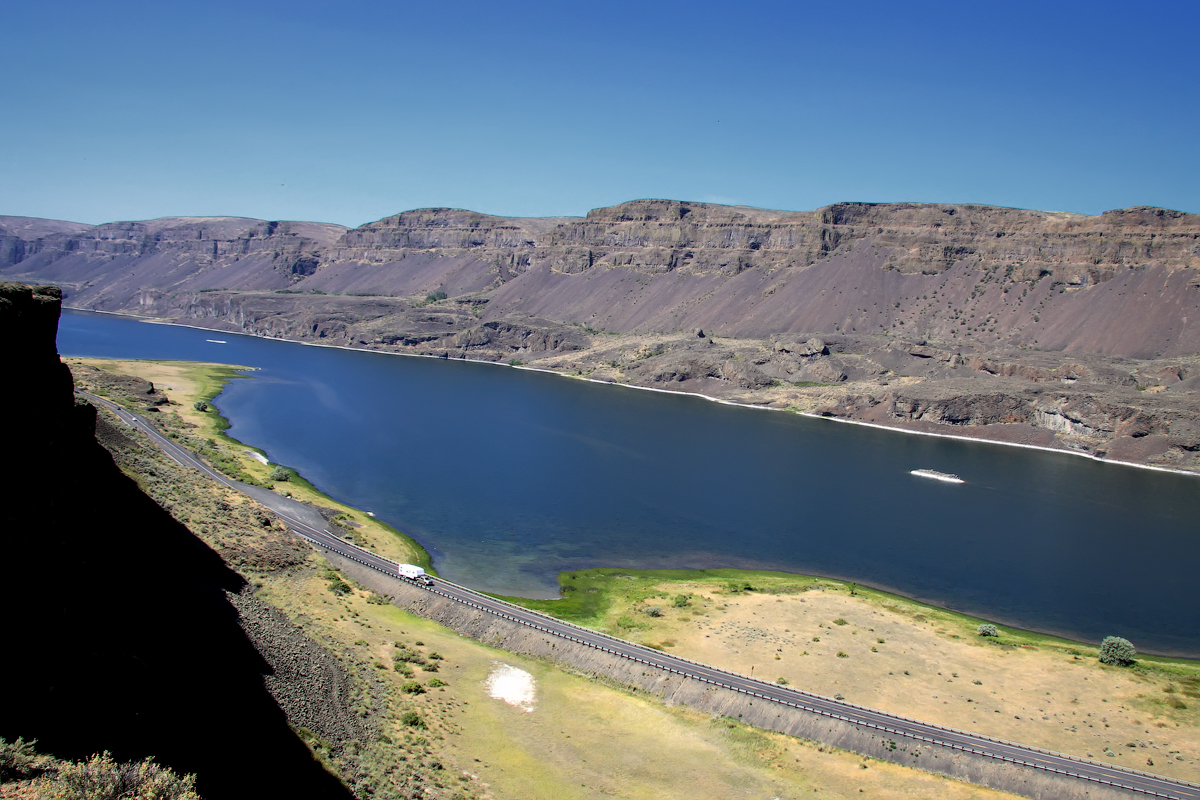
- State Route 17 along Lake Lenore

- Location within Washington (state) Location within the United States
- Location: Grant County, Washington
- Coordinates: 47°30′07″N 119°30′43″W
- Catchment area: 367 sq mi (950 km^{2})
- Basin countries: United States
- Max. length: 8 mi (13 km)
- Surface area: 1,670 acres (680 ha)
- Average depth: 15 ft (4.6 m)
- Max. depth: 27 ft (8.2 m)
- Water volume: 19,500 acre⋅ft (24,100,000 m^{3})
- Shore length^{1}: 14.4 mi (23.2 km)
- Surface elevation: 1,075 ft (328 m)
- ^{1} Shore length is not a well-defined measure.

Lake Lenore, also known as Lenore Lake, is located in Grant County, Washington, United States. It is a 1,670 acres (680 ha) lake formed by the Missoula Floods in the lower Coulee just north of the town of Soap Lake, Washington. It is situated between Alkali Lake to the north and Soap Lake to the south. The lake is rather narrow, but long. The length of the lake runs north–south alongside State Route 17 leading from near the city of Soap Lake to Coulee City. The lake also consists of more than 7 islands.

Lenore Canyon is a coulee associated with the development of the Scablands.

One of the interesting areas around Lake Lenore is the Lenore Caves. Located at the northern end of the lake, the Lenore Caves are a series of overhangs along the cliffs at the lake. They exist in one of the largest volcanic regions on Earth.

== Lenore Caves ==
The Lenore Caves were formed by the plucking of basalt from the walls of the coulees by the Missoula floods and are geologically different from most caverns. They were later used as shelters by early Native Americans.

The trail is accessible from State Route 17 along Lake Lenore via a road to a parking area.

== History ==
On January 13, 1947, the U.S. War Assets Administration disposed of drums of sodium into Lake Lenore.
