= Brewster Bridge =

Bridge over Columbia River

- Coordinates: 48°05′12.6″N 119°46′51″W
- Carries: SR 173
- Crosses: Columbia River
- Locale: Brewster, Washington
- Official name: Columbia River Bridge at Brewster
- Owner: Washington State Department of Transportation
- ID number: 0008566A

History
- Opened: 1928
- Rebuilt: 1970

The Brewster Bridge, officially the Columbia River Bridge at Brewster, is a two-lane highway bridge crossing the Columbia River at Brewster, Washington. It is part of State Route 173 and is 10 miles (16 km) west of Bridgeport. The original bridge, constructed between August 1927 and June 1928, was used until it was destroyed by a fire in 1968. A second bridge at the location was built in 1970.

== History ==
Before the bridge, three ferries crossed the Columbia River in the Brewster area. A bridge was proposed to connect Okanogan County and the Sunset Highway. The original bridge was a steel truss bridge with five piers that spanned a total length of 1,596 feet (486 m). The bridge was built by a private company and had a toll until it was purchased by the Washington Department of Transport, who then raised it by 7.5 feet (2.3 m) to make room for rising water from Wells Dam downriver.

On August 5, 1968, a welding torch caused a fire in the center of the bridge that caused it to collapse.

A second bridge at Brewster was completed in 1970 and was built on the original piers. Before the bridges completion a 15 minute ferry was used as a temporary replacement for the crossing.

In 1986, the state unsuccessfully attempted to transfer SR 173, including the bridge, to the county government. The Brewster Bridge was deemed eligible for inclusion on the National Register of Historic Places.
