= Columbia River Bridge =

Columbia River Bridge may refer to:

- Columbia River Bridge (Wenatchee, Washington)
- Columbia River Bridge (Bridgeport, Washington)

== See also ==
- List of crossings of the Columbia River
