= Coulee Corridor Scenic Byway =

Scenic road in Washington, US

The Coulee Corridor Scenic Byway is a National Scenic Byway in the U.S. state of Washington. It has three component highways:

- SR 17 from Othello to Coulee City;
- US 2 in Coulee City; and
- SR 155 from Coulee City to Omak
