= Mesa, Washington =

Mesa (Mee-sa) City in Washington, United States

Mesa
- City
- Location of Mesa, Washington
- Coordinates: 46°34′19″N 118°59′51″W
- Country: United States
- State: Washington
- County: Franklin

Government
  - Type: Mayor–council
  - Mayor: Jim Cronenwett

Area
  - Total: 1.66 sq mi (4.29 km^{2})
  - Land: 1.66 sq mi (4.29 km^{2})
  - Water: 0 sq mi (0.00 km^{2})
- Elevation: 742 ft (226 m)

Population (2020)
  - Total: 385
  - Density: 232/sq mi (89.7/km^{2})
- Time zone: UTC-8 (Pacific (PST))
  - Summer (DST): UTC-7 (PDT)
- ZIP code: 99343
- Area code: 509
- FIPS code: 53-45180
- GNIS feature ID: 2411088

Mesa (MAY-suh) is a city in Franklin County, Washington, United States. The population was 385 at the 2020 census.

== History ==
Originally called Bluff Wells, then Judson, now Mesa was a stop on the Ainsworth (now Pasco) to Spokane branch of the Northern Pacific Railroad. It was the stop between Eltopia and Palouse Junction (now Connell). The station was established in 1883.

The Columbia Basin Irrigation Project brought water to the area in 1948. Prior to this development, people relied on either private wells or the railroad well at Mesa. Mesa was officially incorporated on June 23, 1955.

== Geography ==
Mesa is situated in Esquatzel Coulee at the junction of U.S. Route 395 and State Route 17, the latter of which has its southern terminus in Mesa. Route 395 connects Mesa with Interstate 82 in the Tri-Cities to the southwest and Interstate 90 in Ritzville to the northeast. Its location in a coulee means Mesa sits in a depression relative to the surrounding terrain, which rises a few hundred feet around the city.

According to the United States Census Bureau, the city has a total area of 1.64 square miles (4.25 km^{2}), all of it land.

== Demographics ==
Historical population
Census	Pop.	Note	%±
1960	263		—
1970	274		4.2%
1980	278		1.5%
1990	252		−9.4%
2000	425		68.7%
2010	489		15.1%
2020	385		−21.3%
U.S. Decennial Census; 2018 Estimate

=== 2020 census ===
As of the 2020 census, Mesa had a population of 385. The median age was 27.5 years. 33.8% of residents were under the age of 18 and 7.3% of residents were 65 years of age or older. For every 100 females there were 102.6 males, and for every 100 females age 18 and over there were 114.3 males age 18 and over.

0.0% of residents lived in urban areas, while 100.0% lived in rural areas.

There were 105 households in Mesa, of which 53.3% had children under the age of 18 living in them. Of all households, 59.0% were married-couple households, 21.0% were households with a male householder and no spouse or partner present, and 12.4% were households with a female householder and no spouse or partner present. About 9.5% of all households were made up of individuals and 3.9% had someone living alone who was 65 years of age or older.

There were 119 housing units, of which 11.8% were vacant. The homeowner vacancy rate was 5.6% and the rental vacancy rate was 2.5%.

Racial composition as of the 2020 census
Race	Number	Percent
White	113	29.4%
Black or African American	3	0.8%
American Indian and Alaska Native	9	2.3%
Asian	8	2.1%
Native Hawaiian and Other Pacific Islander	1	0.3%
Some other race	145	37.7%
Two or more races	106	27.5%
Hispanic or Latino (of any race)	293	76.1%

=== 2010 census ===
As of the 2010 census, there were 489 people, 124 households, and 106 families residing in the city. The population density was 298.2 inhabitants per square mile (115.1/km^{2}). There were 128 housing units at an average density of 78.0 per square mile (30.1/km^{2}). The racial makeup of the city was 67.7% White, 1.6% African American, 0.4% Native American, 0.4% Asian, 26.8% from other races, and 3.1% from two or more races. Hispanic or Latino of any race were 75.3% of the population.

There were 124 households, of which 66.1% had children under the age of 18 living with them, 58.1% were married couples living together, 14.5% had a female householder with no husband present, 12.9% had a male householder with no wife present, and 14.5% were non-families. 9.7% of all households were made up of individuals, and 2.4% had someone living alone who was 65 years of age or older. The average household size was 3.94 and the average family size was 4.08.

The median age in the city was 23.8 years. 36.8% of residents were under the age of 18; 15.4% were between the ages of 18 and 24; 27.6% were from 25 to 44; 16.5% were from 45 to 64; and 3.7% were 65 years of age or older. The gender makeup of the city was 51.1% male and 48.9% female.

=== 2000 census ===
As of the 2000 census, there were 425 people, 105 households, and 91 families residing in the city. The population density was 268.7 people per square mile (103.9/km^{2}). There were 111 housing units at an average density of 70.2 per square mile (27.1/km^{2}). The racial makeup of the city was 58.59% White, 0.94% Native American, 0.47% Asian, 28.24% from other races, and 11.76% from two or more races. Hispanic or Latino of any race were 59.29% of the population.

There were 105 households, out of which 64.8% had children under the age of 18 living with them, 71.4% were married couples living together, 5.7% had a female householder with no husband present, and 13.3% were non-families. 7.6% of all households were made up of individuals, and 4.8% had someone living alone who was 65 years of age or older. The average household size was 4.05 and the average family size was 4.15.

In the city, the age distribution of the population shows 42.6% under the age of 18, 11.1% from 18 to 24, 30.4% from 25 to 44, 10.1% from 45 to 64, and 5.9% who were 65 years of age or older. The median age was 22 years. For every 100 females, there were 105.3 males. For every 100 females age 18 and over, there were 110.3 males.

The median income for a household in the city was $38,750, and the median income for a family was $39,583. Males had a median income of $28,250 versus $21,250 for females. The per capita income for the city was $18,882. About 9.0% of families and 15.1% of the population were below the poverty line, including 14.4% of those under age 18 and none of those age 65 or over.

== Current events ==
In 2008, the city was involved in litigation with former mayor and councilwoman Donna Zink over incorrectly handled public document requests under Washington State's Public Records Act. A Superior Court judge has ruled that the town of Mesa must pay its former mayor about $230,000 after losing the long-running dispute.
