= Nat W. Washington =

American politician

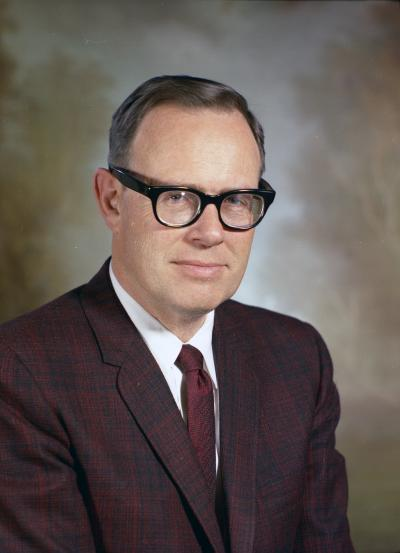
- Washington in 1967

Member of the Washington House of Representatives for the 13th district
- In office 1949–1951

Member of the Washington State Senate for the 13th district
- In office 1951–1979

Personal details
- Born: May 2, 1914 Coulee City, Washington, United States
- Died: August 18, 2007 (aged 93) Ephrata, Washington, United States
- Party: Democratic

Nathaniel Willis Washington (May 2, 1914 – August 18, 2007) was an American politician in the state of Washington. He served in the Washington House of Representatives from 1973 to 1979 for district 13, and in the Senate from 1979 to his death in 2007.
