= Washington State Route 171 =

State highway in Grant County, Washington, US

State Route 171
- Broadway Avenue
- SR 171 highlighted in red

Route information
- Auxiliary route of SR 17
- Maintained by WSDOT
- Length: 3.79 mi (6.10 km)
- Existed: 1964–present

Major junctions
- South end: I-90 in Moses Lake
- I-90 BL in Moses Lake
- North end: SR 17 in Moses Lake

Location
- Country: United States
- State: Washington
- Counties: Grant

Highway system
- State highways in Washington; Interstate; US; State; Scenic; Pre-1964; 1964 renumbering; Former
← SR 170	→ SR 172

State Route 171 (SR 171, named Broadway Avenue) is a 3.79-mile (6.10 km) long state highway serving the city of Moses Lake in Grant County, located in the U.S. state of Washington. Broadway Avenue begins at an interchange with Interstate 90 (I-90) and travels northeast through Downtown Moses Lake concurrent to Interstate 90 Business and parallel to Parker Horn before ending at an intersection with SR 17. Broadway Avenue was previously part of Primary State Highway 18 (PSH 18) and U.S. Route 10 (US 10) until the 1964 highway renumbering. The highway also has an un-built extension from Moses Lake northeast to Odessa that was first legislated in 1955 as Secondary State Highway 7E (SSH 7E).

== Route description ==
State Route 171 (SR 171) and Interstate 90 Business (I-90 Business) begin their 2.99-mile (4.81 km) long concurrency as Broadway Avenue at a diamond interchange with Interstate 90 (I-90) in Moses Lake. The street travels north over a branch of the Columbia Basin Railroad into Downtown Moses Lake and turns northeast to parallel the Parker Horn before the split between SR 171 and I-90 Business, which becomes Pioneer Way. The highway continues northeast to leave Downtown Moses Lake and end at an intersection with SR 17, which bypasses the city.

Every year the Washington State Department of Transportation (WSDOT) conducts a series of surveys on its highways in the state to measure traffic volume. This is expressed in terms of annual average daily traffic (AADT), which is a measure of traffic volume for any average day of the year. In 2011, WSDOT calculated that between 3,900 and 21,000 vehicles per day used the highway, mostly in the Yakima area.

== History ==
Broadway Avenue was originally part of Primary State Highway 18 (PSH 18), which extended from George to Ritzville. PSH 18 was created in 1937 and crossed the western part of Moses Lake into Downtown Moses Lake on a bridge that was built in 1924. U.S. Route 10 (US 10) was re-routed onto PSH 18 in the 1940s, and both highways began using a proposed southern bypass of the city in 1955. A road connecting Moses Lake to Odessa in the northeast was proposed in the late 1940s, and was signed into law in 1955 as Secondary State Highway 7E. Interstate 90 (I-90) replaced US 10 and PSH 18 during the creation of the Interstate Highway System in 1956, and SSH 7E was replaced by State Route 171 (SR 171) in a 1964 renumbering. No major revisions to the highway have occurred since 1964, and the route to Odessa remains un-built as of 2012.

== Major intersections ==
The entire highway is in Moses Lake, Grant County.

mi	km	Destinations	Notes
0.00– 0.07	0.00– 0.11	I-90 – Spokane, Seattle	Southern terminus; interchange; south end of SR 171 / I-90 Business overlap
2.99	4.81	I-90 BL east (Pioneer Way)	North end of SR 171 / I-90 Business overlap
3.79	6.10	SR 17 – Ephrata, Othello	Northern terminus
1.000 mi = 1.609 km; 1.000 km = 0.621 mi
