= Wilbur, Washington =

- Town
- Town of Wilbur
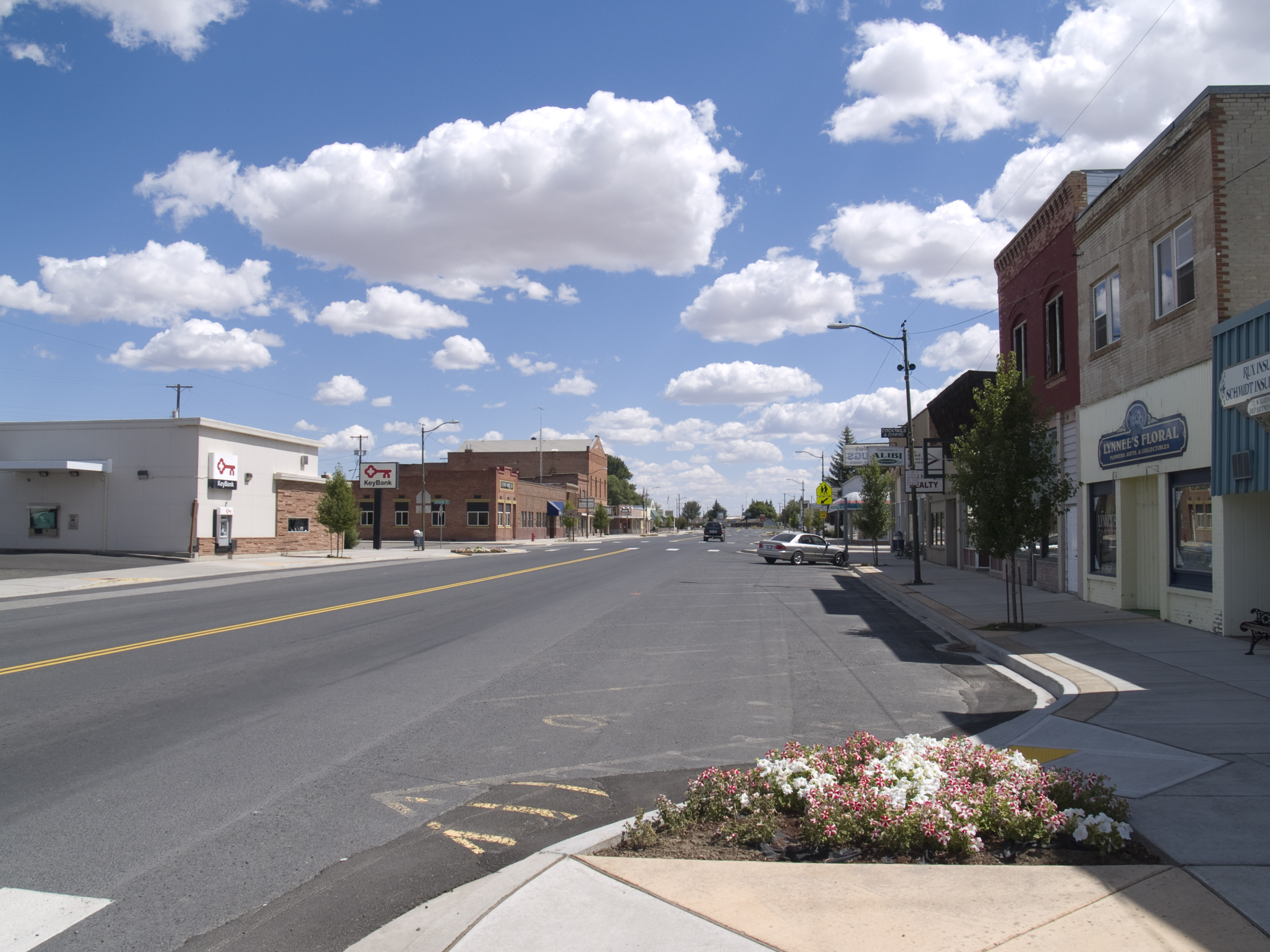
- Downtown Wilbur

- Location of Wilbur, Washington
- Coordinates: 47.758132°N 118.71194°W
- Country: United States
- State: Washington
- County: Lincoln

Government
  - Type: Mayor–council
  - Mayor: Erica Hearrean

Area
  - Total: 1.32 sq mi (3.42 km^{2})
  - Land: 1.32 sq mi (3.42 km^{2})
  - Water: 0 sq mi (0.00 km^{2})
- Elevation: 2,172 ft (662 m)

Population (2020)
  - Total: 895
  - Estimate (2021): 914
  - Density: 678/sq mi (262/km^{2})
- Time zone: UTC-8 (Pacific (PST))
  - Summer (DST): UTC-7 (PDT)
- ZIP code: 99185
- Area code: 509
- FIPS code: 53-78680
- GNIS feature ID: 1509502
- Website: www.wilburwa.gov

Wilbur is a town in Lincoln County, Washington, United States. The population was 895 at the 2020 census.

== History ==
Just prior to the construction of the Central Washington Railroad line in 1889, no towns existed west of Davenport in Lincoln County. One place along the line, "Wild Goose Bill's Ranch," run by Samuel Wilbur Condit, was assigned a post office by the Federal government. Condit was 62 years old and known throughout the region as Wild Goose Bill when he and another man shot each other to death on January 21, 1895. The town was originally named "Goosetown" in his honor, however, after the local blacksmith's wife complained that she would never live somewhere with such a silly name, the town was christened "Wilbur" in 1889.

It had been located on the stage line between Davenport and the Mines in northern Washington and with the speculation of the railroad arriving soon seemed a likely place for a town. The town grew in earnest and was platted in April 1889. With the arrival of the railroad later that year, Wilbur's growth increased rapidly with the establishment of bigger hotels, a bank, a lumber mill and countless other businesses. After several failed attempts to incorporate in 1889, Wilbur was officially incorporated on August 11, 1890. The boom had slowed by 1891 and came to a halt with the Panic of 1893. A fire in October 1891 caused damage to the town, killing 4.

Wilbur was brought out of the hard times of the 1890s during a record wheat harvest in 1897 which brought over $1,000,000 to circulation in the town. The construction of a road to Republic then a flourishing mining camp in what was to become Ferry County was expected to increase traffic to Wilbur, but the expected benefit never materialized. After a July 5, 1901, fire destroyed several city blocks, causing $155,000 in damage ($3.9 million in 2017 dollars), a water works was established in 1903. Wilbur was electrically lighted in October 1903 by the Wilbur Electric Company.

Wilbur gained news coverage in July 2007 as a result of crop circles found roughly 10 miles north of town, just off of Highway 2. The origin of these depressions in the wheat crop of local farmer Jim Llewellyn is unknown, and the phenomenon was covered by new stations as well as newspapers. More crop circles were discovered in August 2009. On July 31, 2012, crop circles appeared for the third time in wheat fields near the town.

== Geography ==
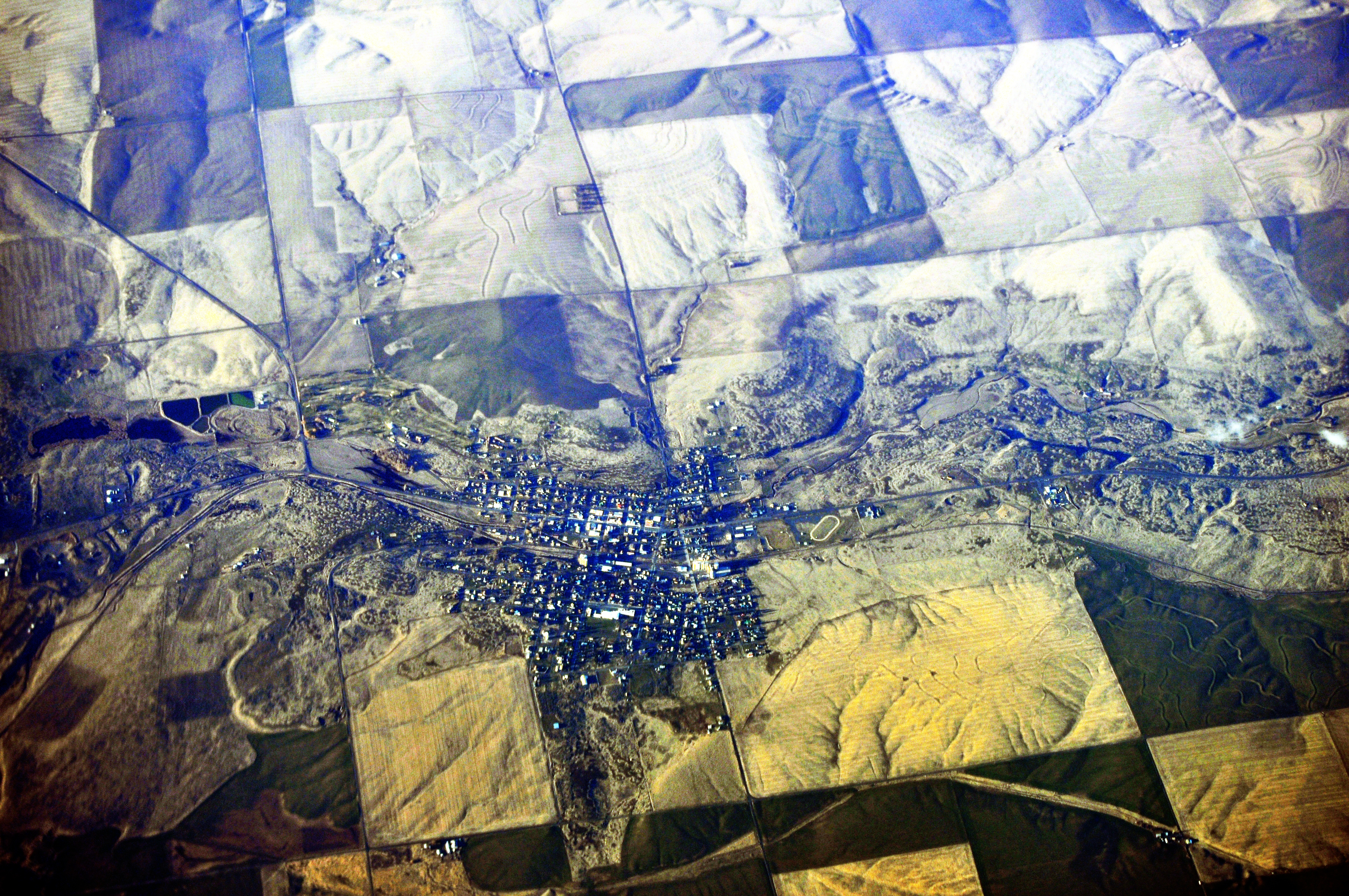
Aerial view of Wilbur

Wilbur is located in northwestern Lincoln County on U.S. Route 2 approximately 14 miles (23 km) south of Franklin D. Roosevelt Lake on the Columbia River. The town is connected by additional highways: State Route 21 continues north to the Keller Ferry and south to Interstate 90 in Washington; and State Route 174 travels northwest to the Grand Coulee Dam.

Wilbur is situated in an oblong basin with Goose Creek, also named for Wild Goose Bill, running through the center of the town, and abrupt, basaltic cliffs, not of very great elevation, on the north and south. At one time this spot was, evidently, a lake. During the construction of U.S. Route 2, the course of Goose Creek was altered, moving its flow southward as it flows to the west, part of the Wilson Creek watershed.

According to the United States Census Bureau, the town has a total area of 1.37 square miles (3.55 km^{2}), all of it land.

== Climate ==
Wilbur has a semi-arid climate (BSk) closely bordering a humid continental climate (Dsb), according to the Köppen climate classification system.

Climate data for Wilbur
| Month | Jan | Feb | Mar | Apr | May | Jun | Jul | Aug | Sep | Oct | Nov | Dec | Year |
|---|---|---|---|---|---|---|---|---|---|---|---|---|---|
| Record high °F (°C) | 53 (12) | 61 (16) | 75 (24) | 90 (32) | 96 (36) | 110 (43) | 110 (43) | 106 (41) | 100 (38) | 87 (31) | 69 (21) | 56 (13) | 110 (43) |
| Mean daily maximum °F (°C) | 31.6 (−0.2) | 38.2 (3.4) | 49.0 (9.4) | 59.6 (15.3) | 68.7 (20.4) | 76.0 (24.4) | 85.1 (29.5) | 83.9 (28.8) | 74.6 (23.7) | 60.7 (15.9) | 42.9 (6.1) | 33.5 (0.8) | 58.7 (14.8) |
| Mean daily minimum °F (°C) | 17.6 (−8.0) | 21.9 (−5.6) | 28.1 (−2.2) | 32.8 (0.4) | 39.2 (4.0) | 44.8 (7.1) | 49.5 (9.7) | 48.6 (9.2) | 41.9 (5.5) | 33.6 (0.9) | 26.9 (−2.8) | 20.9 (−6.2) | 33.8 (1.0) |
| Record low °F (°C) | −27 (−33) | −30 (−34) | −4 (−20) | 10 (−12) | 19 (−7) | 25 (−4) | 25 (−4) | 25 (−4) | 14 (−10) | 1 (−17) | −18 (−28) | −23 (−31) | −30 (−34) |
| Average precipitation inches (mm) | 1.4 (36) | 1.11 (28) | 0.98 (25) | 0.89 (23) | 1.2 (30) | 1 (25) | 0.52 (13) | 0.49 (12) | 0.59 (15) | 0.99 (25) | 1.62 (41) | 1.63 (41) | 12.42 (315) |
| Average snowfall inches (cm) | 8.4 (21) | 4.6 (12) | 1.3 (3.3) | 0.3 (0.76) | 0 (0) | 0 (0) | 0 (0) | 0 (0) | 0 (0) | 0.1 (0.25) | 3.1 (7.9) | 8.1 (21) | 25.9 (66) |
| Average precipitation days | 8 | 6 | 6 | 5 | 6 | 5 | 3 | 3 | 4 | 6 | 8 | 8 | 68 |

== Demographics ==
Historical population
| Census | Pop. | Note | %± |
|---|---|---|---|
| 1890 | 410 | | — |
| 1900 | 595 | | 45.1% |
| 1910 | 757 | | 27.2% |
| 1920 | 870 | | 14.9% |
| 1930 | 737 | | −15.3% |
| 1940 | 1,011 | | 37.2% |
| 1950 | 1,043 | | 3.2% |
| 1960 | 1,138 | | 9.1% |
| 1970 | 1,074 | | −5.6% |
| 1980 | 1,122 | | 4.5% |
| 1990 | 863 | | −23.1% |
| 2000 | 914 | | 5.9% |
| 2010 | 884 | | −3.3% |
| 2020 | 895 | | 1.2% |
| 2021 (est.) | 914 | ▲ | 2.1% |
U.S. Decennial Census; 2020 Census

=== 2010 census ===
As of the 2010 census, there were 884 people, 404 households, and 243 families residing in the town. The population density was 645.3 inhabitants per square mile (249.2/km^{2}). There were 468 housing units at an average density of 341.6 per square mile (131.9/km^{2}). The racial makeup of the town was 93.4% White, 0.3% African American, 2.7% Native American, 0.5% Asian, 0.2% Pacific Islander, and 2.8% from two or more races. Hispanic or Latino of any race were 2.3% of the population.

There were 404 households, of which 22.8% had children under the age of 18 living with them, 50.7% were married couples living together, 5.7% had a female householder with no husband present, 3.7% had a male householder with no wife present, and 39.9% were non-families. 35.1% of all households were made up of individuals, and 20% had someone living alone who was 65 years of age or older. The average household size was 2.16 and the average family size was 2.81.

The median age in the town was 50.2 years. 20.4% of residents were under the age of 18; 5% were between the ages of 18 and 24; 18.2% were from 25 to 44; 31.1% were from 45 to 64; and 25.2% were 65 years of age or older. The gender makeup of the town was 47.3% male and 52.7% female.

=== 2000 census ===
As of the 2000 census, there were 914 people, 396 households, and 266 families residing in the town. The population density was 680.2 people per square mile (263.4/km^{2}). There were 480 housing units at an average density of 357.2 per square mile (138.3/km^{2}). The racial makeup of the town was 96.50% White, 1.20% Native American, 0.22% Asian, 0.11% Pacific Islander, 0.55% from other races, and 1.42% from two or more races. Hispanic or Latino of any race were 1.75% of the population.

There were 396 households, out of which 27.0% had children under the age of 18 living with them, 59.3% were married couples living together, 5.1% had a female householder with no husband present, and 32.8% were non-families. 29.5% of all households were made up of individuals, and 15.7% had someone living alone who was 65 years of age or older. The average household size was 2.29 and the average family size was 2.83.

In the town, the population was spread out, with 23.4% under the age of 18, 5.0% from 18 to 24, 19.7% from 25 to 44, 30.3% from 45 to 64, and 21.6% who were 65 years of age or older. The median age was 46 years. For every 100 females, there were 89.6 males. For every 100 females age 18 and over, there were 87.2 males.

The median income for a household in the town was $32,563, and the median income for a family was $37,431. Men had a median income of $32,440 versus $20,417 for women. The per capita income for the town was $16,535. About 14.4% of families and 17.4% of the population were below the poverty line, including 24.6% of those under age 18 and 9.6% of those age 65 or over.
