= Columbia River Bridge (Bridgeport, Washington) =

- Columbia River Bridge at Bridgeport
- U.S. National Register of Historic Places
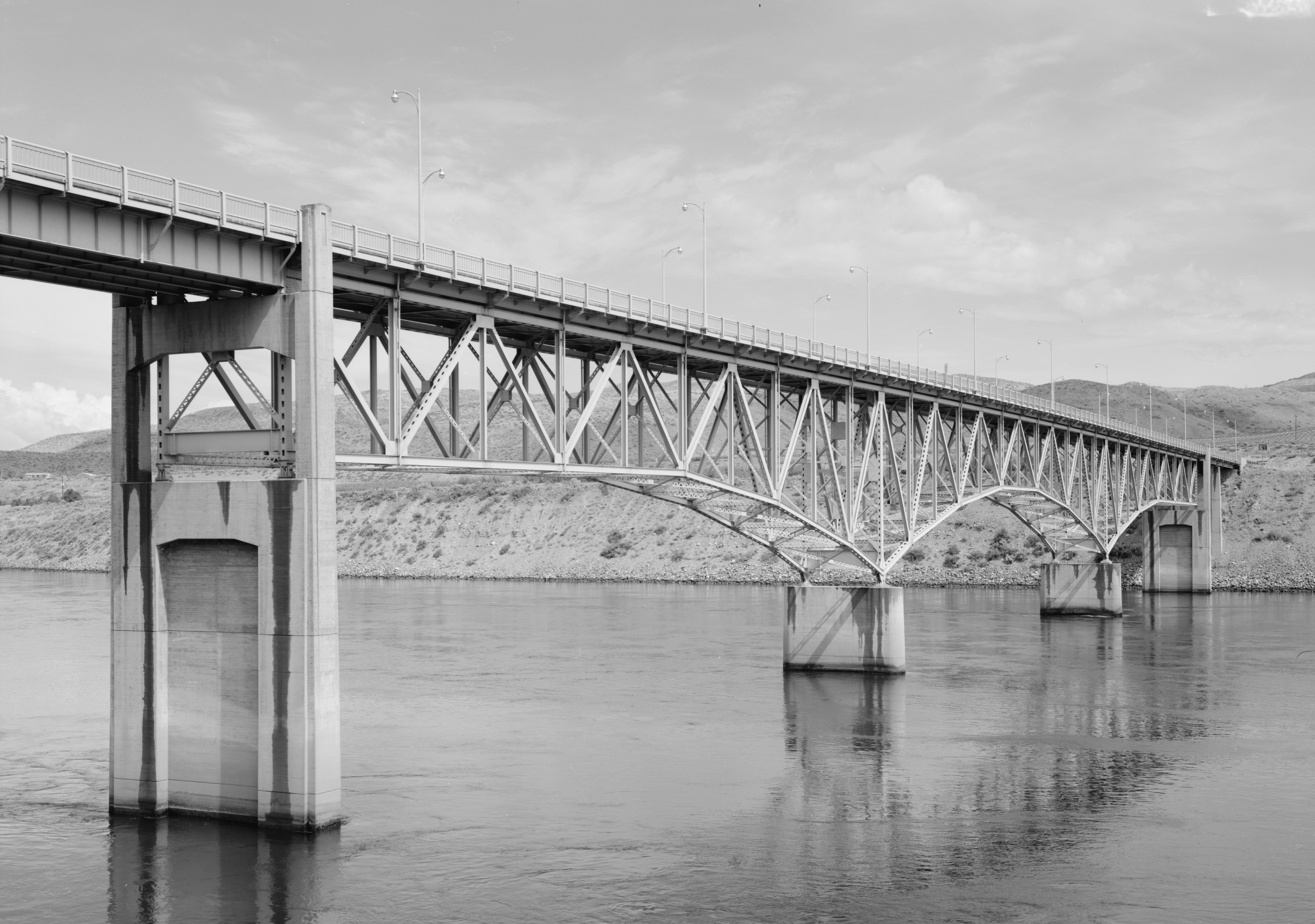

- Location within Washington (state) Location within the United States
- Location: SR 17
- Nearest city: Bridgeport, Washington
- Coordinates: 48°00′04″N 119°39′17″W
- Built: 1950
- MPS: Bridges of Washington State MPS
- NRHP reference No.: 95000632
- Added to NRHP: May 31, 1995

The Columbia River Bridge, also known as the Bridgeport Bridge, at Bridgeport, Washington, was built to span the Columbia River in 1950. Composed of three spans, the bridge is a steel continuous riveted deck truss carrying Washington State Route 17 on a 26-foot-wide (7.9 m) roadway and two 3-foot (0.91 m) sidewalks. The center portion of the bridge spans 300 feet (91 m), flanked by 250-foot (76 m) end spans. The 70-foot (21 m) north approach span and the 100-foot (30 m) south approach span are supported by steel plate girders. The bridge played a significant role in the construction of the Chief Joseph Dam just upstream, as no bridge crossing had previously existed in the area. Construction on the dam started in 1945 and was completed, apart from the powerplant, in 1955. The bridge was designed and built by the U.S. Army Corps of Engineers as part of the Chief Joseph Dam project, and is significant for its association with the project and as a major crossing of the Columbia.

The bridge was placed on the National Register of Historic Places on May 31, 1995.

== See also ==
- List of bridges documented by the Historic American Engineering Record in Washington (state)
