= Coulee =

Type of valley or drainage zone

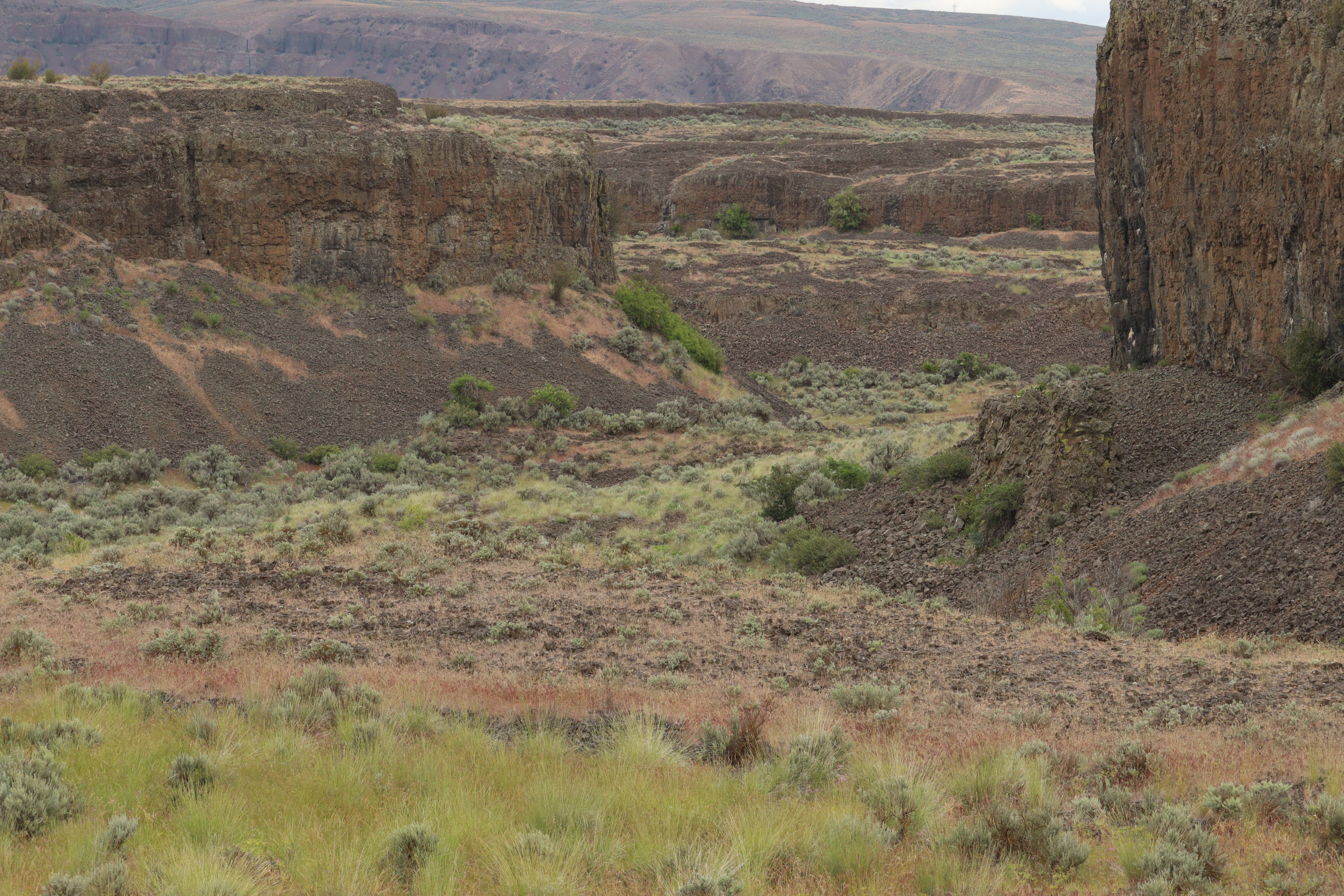
This side canyon of Grand Coulee in Washington was carved by the Missoula floods.

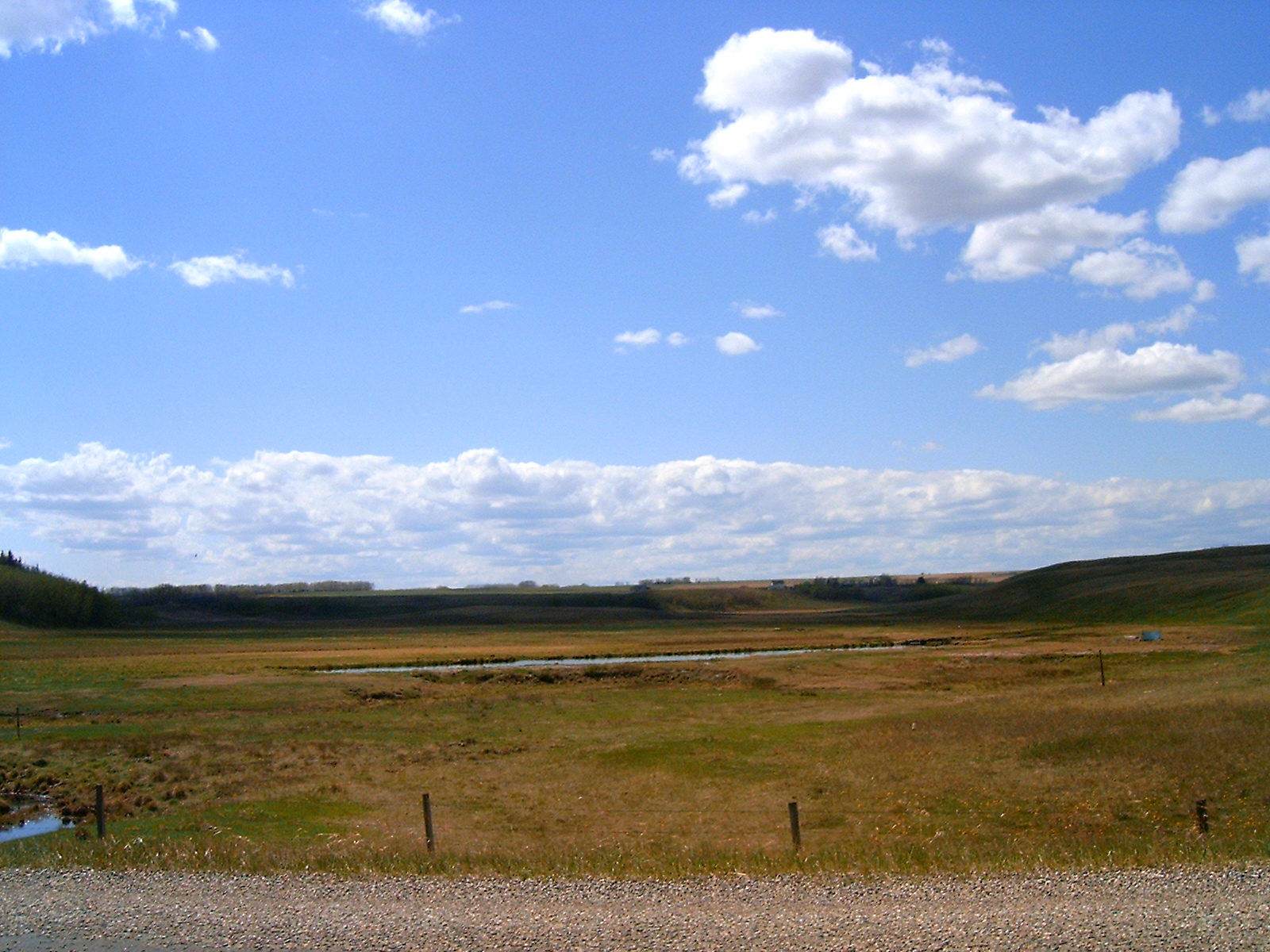
A view through a coulee in Alberta, with steep but lower sides, and water in the bottom.

Coulee, or coulée (/ˈkuːleɪ/ or /ˈkuːliː/), is any of various different landforms, all of which are kinds of valleys or drainage zones. The word coulee comes from the Canadian French coulée, from French couler 'to flow'.

The term is often used interchangeably in the Great Plains for any of a number of water features, from ponds to creeks.

In southern Louisiana the word coulée (also spelled coolie) originally meant a gully or ravine usually dry or intermittent but becoming sizable during rainy weather. As stream channels were dredged or canalized, the term was increasingly applied to perennial streams, generally smaller than bayous. The term is also used for small ditches or canals in the swamp.

In the northwestern United States, coulee is defined as a large, steep-walled, trench-like trough, which also include spillways and flood channels incised into the basalt plateau.

== Types and examples ==
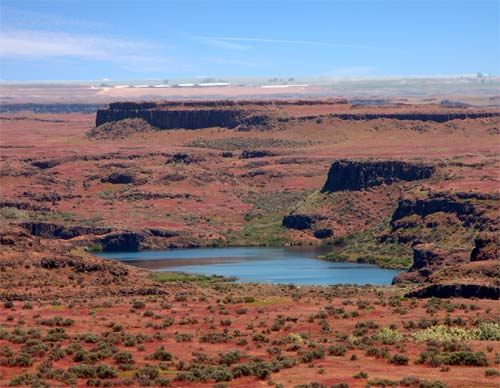
Drumheller Channels in the Columbia Basin of Washington

- The dry, braided channels formed by glacial drainage of the Scablands of eastern Washington, such as Grand Coulee and Moses Coulee. Moses Coulee and Lenore Canyon, lower Grand Coulee, have hanging valleys, where pre-flood tributaries enter the coulees at least 100 m (330 ft) above the coulee floor. In this area of eastern Washington glacial ice lobes from the Cordilleran ice sheet moved south and blocked the east west flowing portion of the Columbia River. This formed glacial lakes dammed by ice raising the water level allowing it to flow over higher divides and form stream courses for many years. Catastrophic floods, Missoula Floods, moved through this area creating deep canyons in the Columbia River Basalt Group. When the glaciers receded the water level lowered to normal flow elevations. This left these water courses, coulees, without a modern headwater connection. These large canyons now only flow with local runoff and ground water. The Grand Coulee has a reservoir, Banks Lake, with a dam at the upstream and downstream end and water is pumped up the geologic ice age divide from Grand Coulee dam and flows down water courses and human built water conveyance to supply water for the Columbia Basin Project.
- The furrowed moraines channeling rain runoff in the area east of the Missouri Coteau in the western United States and western Canada at the base of the Rocky Mountains.
- In the western United States, tongue-like protrusions of solidified lava, forming a sort of canyon.
- In Wisconsin it is applied to valleys. These valleys tend to have high, steep walls. "Hollow" is used as a synonym, often for the smallest of such valleys. The term is also applied to the greater La Crosse, Wisconsin metropolitan area (i.e. the "Coulee Region").
- The Gassman Coulee in North Dakota may have been a contributing factor to the flooding of the Souris River in June 2011.

== Geomorphology ==
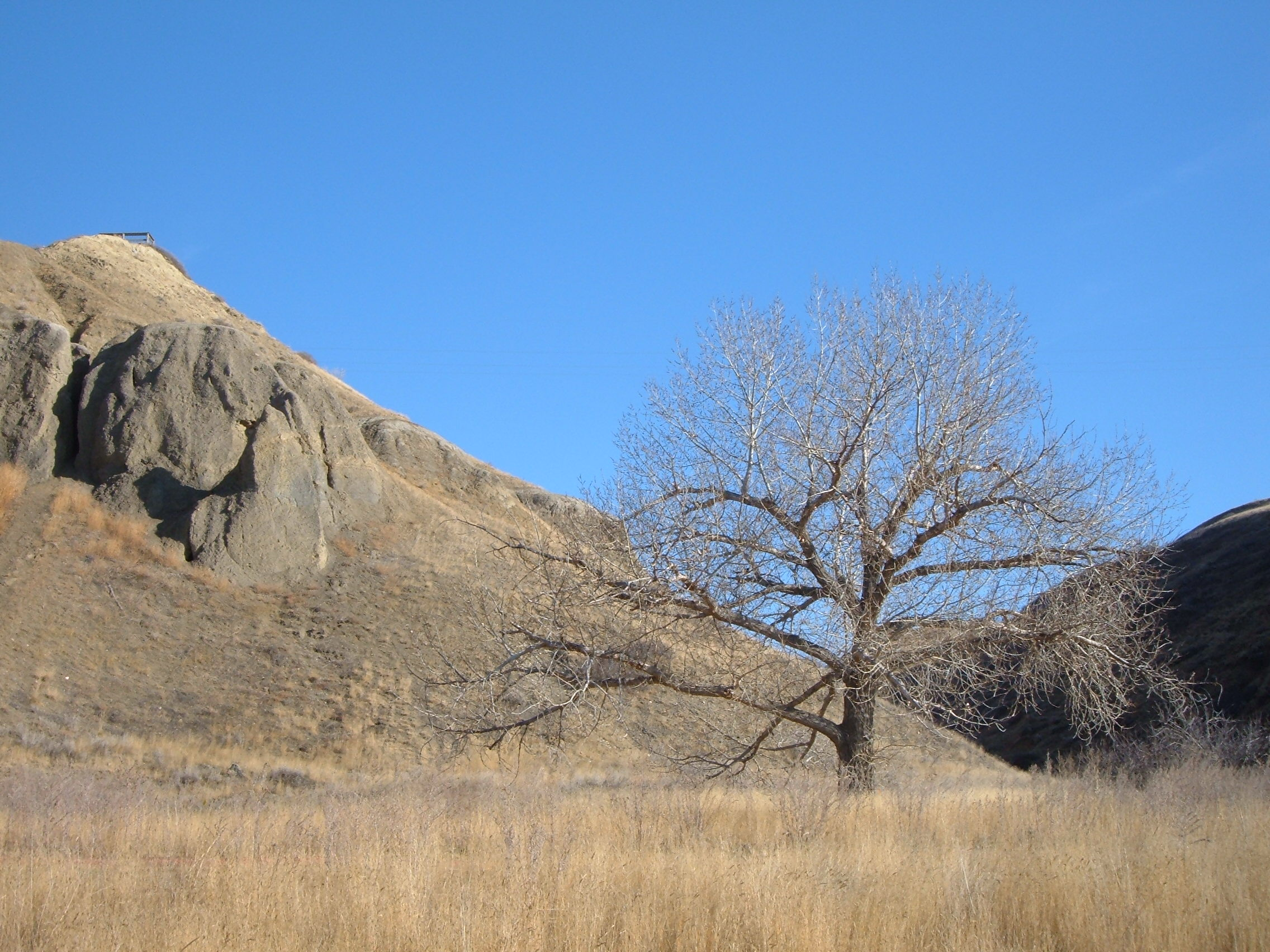
A view upward into a coulee in the Oldman River valley in Lethbridge, Alberta

Aside from those formed by volcanic eruptions, coulees are commonly canyons characterized by steep walls that have been shaped by erosion. These types of coulees are generally found in the northwestern United States and southwestern Canada. In the American west, rapid melting of glaciers at the end of the last ice age caused catastrophic flooding which removed bedrock by massive down-cutting erosion, forming deep canyons. Some coulees may be seasonally dry or contain small streams, however these small misfit streams do not have the magnitude of force necessary to form such expansive erosion.

In Wisconsin, they are the product of nearly a half million years of erosion, unmodified by glaciation (see Driftless Area). The loose rocks at the base of the wall form what are called scree slopes. These are formed when chunks of the canyon wall give way in a rockslide. Left alone, the valleys are often woodland, with the ridgetops transitioning into tallgrass prairie when not turned into pasture or used for row crops.

Coulees provide shelter from wind and concentrated water supplies to plants which would otherwise struggle to survive in the xeric sagebrush steppe. Trees are often found in riparian habitats along streams in coulees and at the base of their walls.

== See also ==
- Channeled Scablands – Landscape in Washington state, US
- Grand Coulee – Ancient river bed in the U.S. state of Washington
