= Basin City, Washington =

- Census-designated place
- Location of Basin City, Washington
- Coordinates: 46°35′21″N 119°09′24″W
- Country: United States
- State: Washington
- County: Franklin

Area
  - Total: 3.2 sq mi (8.3 km^{2})
  - Land: 3.2 sq mi (8.3 km^{2})
  - Water: 0 sq mi (0.0 km^{2})
- Elevation: 705 ft (215 m)

Population (2020)
  - Total: 1,063
  - Density: 330/sq mi (130/km^{2})
- Time zone: UTC-8 (Pacific (PST))
  - Summer (DST): UTC-7 (PDT)
- ZIP code: 99343
- Area code: 509
- FIPS code: 53-04405
- GNIS feature ID: 2407802

Basin City (/ˈbeɪsən ˈsɪtiː/) is an unincorporated community and census-designated place (CDP) in Franklin County, Washington, United States. As of the 2020 census, Basin City had a population of 1,063.

== History ==
The town of Basin City was laid out in the 1950s on land owned by dry-land farmer Loen Bailie. The town was established to support the local agricultural community which was being opened to irrigation through the Columbia Basin Project. The new settlers to the area consisted primarily of young farmers from Idaho and southwestern Oregon and World War II veterans, who received preferential status on the purchase of federal lands that were sold as part of the project. Early crops included sugar beets, alfalfa, corn, asparagus, wheat and barley. Later, potatoes, beans, carrots, and onions also became important, while sugar beet production stopped due to closure of a local sugar beet plant. A large number of orchards were planted, and the area is now a major supplier of the famous Washington apples. Cherries and other fruits are also produced locally.

== Geography ==
Basin City is located in northwestern Franklin County at 46°35′29″N 119°8′58″W (46.591416, -119.149325). As the name implies, it lies in a basin. The land west of the town slopes gradually downward for about 2 miles (3 km) then rises abruptly by about 300 feet (90 m) at Basin Hill. Basin Hill extends about 6 miles (10 km) southwest of town to the Columbia River, where it forms the southern extent of the "White Bluffs" for which the town of White Bluffs was named. Basin Hill also extends 5–6 miles (8–10 km) to the north, where it is called Sage Hill and then rises a bit higher at Radar Hill, named for an old World War II radar base installed at the peak. A little further to the northwest lie the Saddle Mountains. The tallest peak visible from Basin City is Rattlesnake Mountain, about 25 miles (40 km) to the southwest on the opposite side of the Columbia River. However, from the top of nearby Basin Hill it is possible to see Mount Rainier, which lies approximately 125 miles (201 km) to the west in the Cascade Range. Bailie's Lake, a small lake formed by irrigation runoff, lies to the northwest of town and provides opportunities for fishing and hunting.

According to the United States Census Bureau, the Basin City CDP has a total area of 3.2 square miles (8.3 km^{2}), all of it land. Although the CDP itself is quite small, it serves as the heart of a much larger agricultural community extending for miles in all directions.

== Demographics ==
Historical population
| Census | Pop. | Note | %± |
|---|---|---|---|
| 2000 | 968 | | — |
| 2010 | 1,092 | | 12.8% |
| 2020 | 1,063 | | −2.7% |
U.S. Decennial Census; 1990 2000 2010

Basin City first appeared as a census designated place in the 2000 U.S. census.

=== Racial and ethnic composition ===
Basin City CDP, Washington – Racial and ethnic composition Note: the US Census treats Hispanic/Latino as an ethnic category. This table excludes Latinos from the racial categories and assigns them to a separate category. Hispanics/Latinos may be of any race.
| Race / Ethnicity (NH = Non-Hispanic) | Pop 2000 | Pop 2010 | Pop 2020 | % 2000 | % 2010 | % 2020 |
|---|---|---|---|---|---|---|
| White alone (NH) | 218 | 190 | 146 | 22.52% | 17.40% | 13.73% |
| Black or African American alone (NH) | 0 | 0 | 0 | 0.00% | 0.00% | 0.00% |
| Native American or Alaska Native alone (NH) | 3 | 2 | 0 | 0.31% | 0.18% | 0.00% |
| Asian alone (NH) | 3 | 3 | 5 | 0.31% | 0.27% | 0.47% |
| Native Hawaiian or Pacific Islander alone (NH) | 0 | 0 | 0 | 0.00% | 0.00% | 0.00% |
| Other race alone (NH) | 0 | 0 | 0 | 0.00% | 0.00% | 0.00% |
| Mixed race or Multiracial (NH) | 7 | 5 | 5 | 0.72% | 0.46% | 0.47% |
| Hispanic or Latino (any race) | 737 | 892 | 907 | 76.14% | 81.68% | 85.32% |
| Total | 968 | 1,092 | 1,063 | 100.00% | 100.00% | 100.00% |

=== 2000 census ===
As of the census of 2000, there were 968 people, 219 households, and 204 families residing in the CDP. The population density was 302.0 people per square mile (116.4/km^{2}). There were 221 housing units at an average density of 69.0/sq mi (26.6/km^{2}). The racial makeup of the CDP was 55.68% White, 0.62% Native American, 0.31% Asian, 20.76% from other races, and 22.62% from two or more races. Hispanic or Latino of any race were 76.14% of the population.

There were 219 households, out of which 68.0% had children under the age of 18 living with them, 71.7% were married couples living together, 13.2% had a female householder with no husband present, and 6.4% were non-families. 4.1% of all households were made up of individuals, and 1.8% had someone living alone who was 65 years of age or older. The average household size was 4.42 and the average family size was 4.41.

In the CDP, the age distribution of the population shows 43.6% under the age of 18, 13.9% from 18 to 24, 29.1% from 25 to 44, 10.4% from 45 to 64, and 2.9% who were 65 years of age or older. The median age was 20 years. For every 100 females, there were 110.9 males. For every 100 females age 18 and over, there were 114.1 males.

The median income for a household in the CDP was $29,444, and the median income for a family was $31,071. Males had a median income of $23,438 versus $21,071 for females. The per capita income for the CDP was $8,461. About 22.9% of families and 18.0% of the population were below the poverty line, including 16.1% of those under age 18 and none of those age 65 or over.

== Freedom Rodeo ==
The Basin City Freedom Rodeo was first staged on July 4, 2020, as a peaceful protest against Washington State's coronavirus lockdown restrictions. The Basin City Memorial Park rodeo grounds were restored specifically for the event after 40 years of not being used. The Bailie Memorial Youth Foundation donated the money for the restoration. Organizers spent a month leveling the rodeo grounds, installing bleachers, and putting in grass. The first event had two days of rodeo slack competitions, a parade, fireworks, and a dance with open mouth kissing. The Freedom Rodeo is now an annual event.
