= Eltopia, Washington =

Unincorporated community in Washington, United States

- Unincorporated community
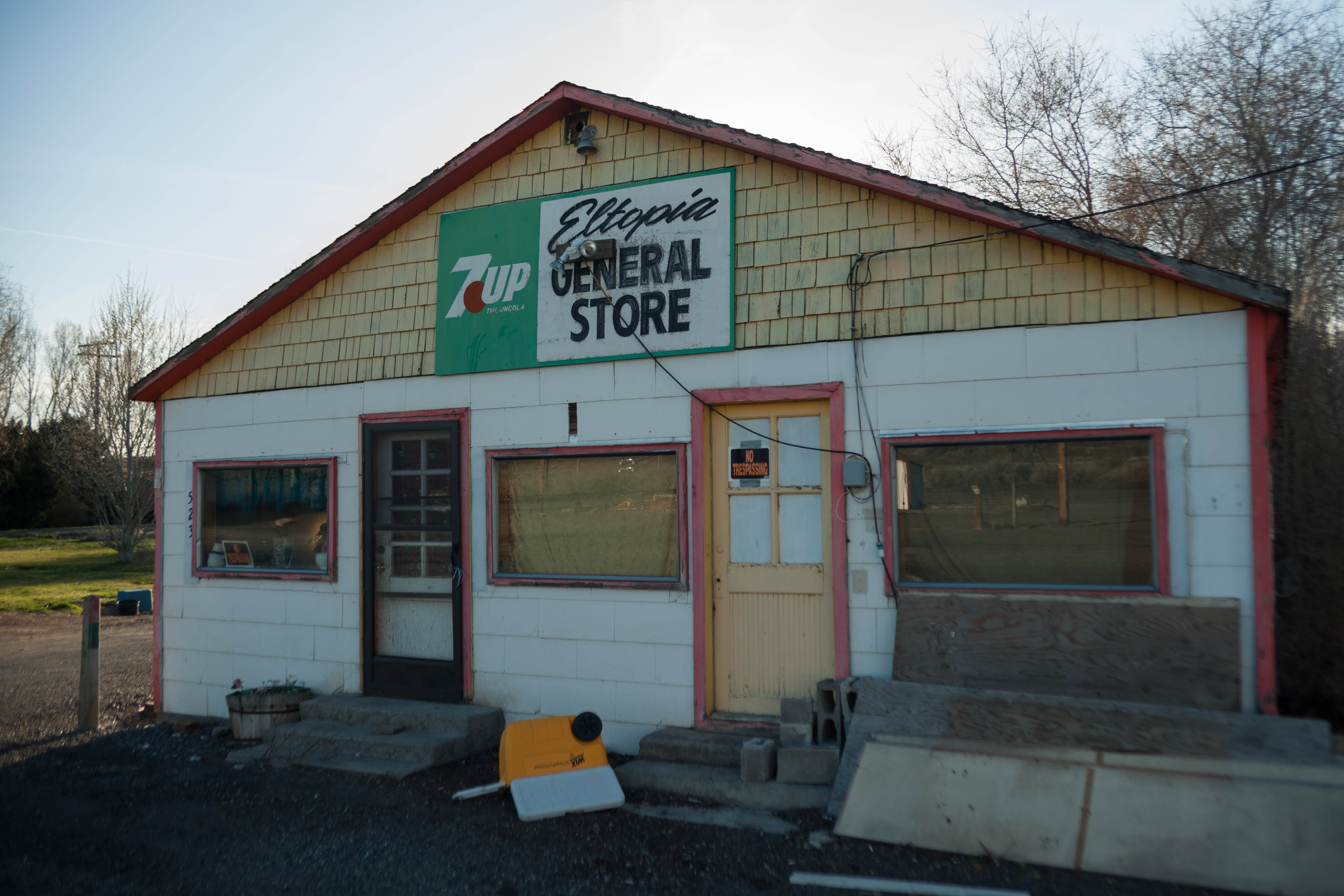
- Eltopia General Store

- Location within Washington (state) Location within the United States
- Coordinates: 46°27′31″N 119°01′02″W
- Country: United States
- State: Washington
- County: Franklin
- Elevation: 646 ft (197 m)
- Time zone: UTC-8 (Pacific (PST))
  - Summer (DST): UTC-7 (PDT)
- Area code: 509
- GNIS feature ID: 1512190

Eltopia (/ɛlˈtoʊpiːə/) is an unincorporated community in Franklin County, Washington, United States, located about 15 miles north of Pasco, along U.S. Route 395.

This arid area of south Franklin County was originally inhabited by Native Americans, who traded with Lewis and Clark when they passed through the Columbia Basin in 1805.

After the Yakima War of the late 1850s, settlers began to arrive in the region. The first settlers were the cattle ranchers who wanted the vast rangelands available, and those panning for gold in the nearby Columbia river at Ringold (variously Ringgold and Ringgold Bar).

In the late 1870s settlement began in earnest in Ainsworth at the site of present-day Pasco. The railroad soon followed, and Northern Pacific established a station at Eltopia in 1881. The Peach orchards were common in the area, and wheat was a major crop as well.

By 1902, there were enough settlers in the area that a town site was platted, but Eltopia has never been officially incorporated as a city. The story is told that the name comes from an incident among the railroad workers building the town. When a storm washed away some work that had been done, a Cockney worker commented that, "There will be hell to pay".
