= Warden, Washington =

Warden
- City

- Location of Warden, Washington
- Coordinates: 46°58′02″N 119°03′08″W
- Country: United States
- State: Washington
- County: Grant

Government
  - Type: Mayor–council
  - Mayor: Rosaelia Martinez

Area
  - Total: 2.95 sq mi (7.65 km^{2})
  - Land: 2.93 sq mi (7.60 km^{2})
  - Water: 0.019 sq mi (0.05 km^{2})
- Elevation: 1,303 ft (397 m)

Population (2020)
  - Total: 2,449
  - Density: 958.6/sq mi (370.12/km^{2})
- Time zone: UTC-8 (Pacific (PST))
  - Summer (DST): UTC-7 (PDT)
- ZIP code: 98857
- Area code: 509
- FIPS code: 53-76160
- GNIS feature ID: 2412179
- Website: cityofwarden.org

Warden is a city in Grant County, Washington, United States. The population was 2,449 at the 2020 census.

== History ==
The Central Basin plateau was settled in the late 1800s by immigrants of Russian-German (Bessarabian) ancestry who homesteaded in the area and farmed dryland wheat. Prior to this the area had been inhabited by local Native American Salish tribes that had contact with the early Spanish and British traders. The Milwaukee Railroad arrived in the early 1900s and attracted additional settlers, including Doc Harris who established a drug and sundries store with physician services in Warden about 1905. The town's name of "Warden" comes from its Bessarabian German heritage and means "worthy" or "treasured" as may be noted in the Das Deutsche Woerterbuch von Jacob und Wilhelm Grimm. A local tradition attributes the name of the town to Doc Harris's son Ward. However, the area of the town was being referred to as "Warden" by its German settlers long before Doc Harris arrived, as may be noted in the Protokol, official church records in German of the original church which is today the Warden Community Church. Other nearby towns also carry Bessarabian German names such as Lind, Ruff, and Odessa. The Bessarabian German tradition of the town has long since vanished and has been mostly replaced with a mixed Anglo/Hispanic culture with a current population that is of roughly 72% Hispanic heritage.

In regards to the history of the present-day Hispanic populace, some of the families can trace their heritage back to the days of the earliest Spanish contact in the area. This first group predates the influx of Bessarabian German settlers by decades. A large number of Hispanics came to work in the fields that opened to more diverse agriculture after the federal Columbia Basin Project brought irrigation to the area. This second group of Hispanics came up from Texas, but they had roots in the villages around the city of Monterey, Mexico. They claim a distinct Tejano culture and have been in the US for generations already. The third group are the most recent arrivals that seem to come mostly from the West Mexican States of Jalisco, Sinaloa, and Sonora. They have a culture that is distinct from the Tejanos in many regards, including language, music, and food. Many in this third group still may speak only Spanish; whereas the other groups may be bilingual or speak only English already.

The Town of Warden was officially incorporated June 28, 1910. By 1917 the population of Warden reached 300. Electricity arrived in 1939, but the town's population declined through World War II.

In 1945 the beginning of the Columbia Basin Project would bring irrigation water from Grand Coulee Dam to irrigate over 530,000 acres (2,100 km^{2}) of arid but fertile soil. In 1948 the federal government started selling government-owned farm units on the Columbia Basin Project to qualified applicants with preference to veterans. By 1954 the East Low Canal was finished. As a result of the project, the population of Warden grew from 322 in 1950 to 949 in 1960 to 1,639 in 1990 and has continued to grow into the 2010s, to a population of around 2,600.

== Geography ==
According to the United States Census Bureau, the city has a total area of 2.61 square miles (6.76 km^{2}), of which, 2.58 square miles (6.68 km^{2}) is land and 0.03 square miles (0.08 km^{2}) is water.

=== Climate ===
According to the Köppen Climate Classification system, Warden has a semi-arid climate, abbreviated "BSk" on climate maps.

Climate data for Warden, Washington
Month	Jan	Feb	Mar	Apr	May	Jun	Jul	Aug	Sep	Oct	Nov	Dec	Year
Mean daily maximum °C (°F)	1 (34)	6 (43)	12 (53)	17 (62)	22 (71)	26 (79)	31 (87)	29 (85)	25 (77)	17 (62)	8 (46)	3 (37)	16 (61)
Mean daily minimum °C (°F)	−8 (18)	−4 (25)	−1 (30)	2 (35)	6 (43)	10 (50)	12 (54)	12 (53)	7 (45)	2 (35)	−2 (28)	−5 (23)	3 (37)
Average precipitation cm (inches)	2.5 (1)	1.8 (0.7)	1.5 (0.6)	1.3 (0.5)	1.8 (0.7)	1.5 (0.6)	0.76 (0.3)	1.0 (0.4)	1.0 (0.4)	1.8 (0.7)	2.5 (1)	2.8 (1.1)	20 (7.9)
Source: Weatherbase

== Demographics ==
Historical population
Census	Pop.	Note	%±
1920	173		—
1930	100		−42.2%
1940	78		−22.0%
1950	322		312.8%
1960	949		194.7%
1970	1,254		32.1%
1980	1,479		17.9%
1990	1,639		10.8%
2000	2,544		55.2%
2010	2,692		5.8%
2020	2,449		−9.0%
U.S. Decennial Census; 2020 Census

=== 2020 census ===
As of the 2020 census, Warden had a population of 2,449. The median age was 30.7 years. 32.5% of residents were under the age of 18 and 9.2% of residents were 65 years of age or older. For every 100 females there were 96.9 males, and for every 100 females age 18 and over there were 93.7 males age 18 and over.

0.0% of residents lived in urban areas, while 100.0% lived in rural areas.

There were 752 households in Warden, of which 49.3% had children under the age of 18 living in them. Of all households, 50.1% were married-couple households, 17.3% were households with a male householder and no spouse or partner present, and 26.5% were households with a female householder and no spouse or partner present. About 16.1% of all households were made up of individuals and 7.4% had someone living alone who was 65 years of age or older.

There were 811 housing units, of which 7.3% were vacant. The homeowner vacancy rate was 1.6% and the rental vacancy rate was 6.6%.

Racial composition as of the 2020 census
Race	Number	Percent
White	766	31.3%
Black or African American	20	0.8%
American Indian and Alaska Native	26	1.1%
Asian	18	0.7%
Native Hawaiian and Other Pacific Islander	1	0.0%
Some other race	1,170	47.8%
Two or more races	448	18.3%
Hispanic or Latino (of any race)	1,976	80.7%

=== 2010 census ===
As of the 2010 census, there were 2,692 people, 759 households, and 621 families residing in the city. The population density was 1,043.4 inhabitants per square mile (402.9/km^{2}). There were 803 housing units at an average density of 311.2 per square mile (120.2/km^{2}). The racial makeup of the city was 48.0% White, 0.4% African American, 0.8% Native American, 0.6% Asian, 46.2% from other races, and 4.0% from two or more races. Hispanic or Latino of any race were 77.1% of the population.

There were 759 households, of which 57.7% had children under the age of 18 living with them, 55.7% were married couples living together, 17.5% had a female householder with no husband present, 8.6% had a male householder with no wife present, and 18.2% were non-families. 15.2% of all households were made up of individuals, and 5.8% had someone living alone who was 65 years of age or older. The average household size was 3.55 and the average family size was 3.94.

The median age in the city was 24.9 years. 39.3% of residents were under the age of 18; 10.8% were between the ages of 18 and 24; 25.1% were from 25 to 44; 18.1% were from 45 to 64; and 6.7% were 65 years of age or older. The gender makeup of the city was 48.1% male and 51.9% female.

=== 2000 census ===
As of the 2000 census, there were 2,544 people, 720 households, and 581 families residing in the city. The population density was 1,212.2 people per square mile (467.7/km^{2}). There were 790 housing units at an average density of 376.4 per square mile (145.2/km^{2}). The racial makeup of the city was 41.55% White, 0.20% African American, 0.90% Native American, 0.31% Asian, 54.09% from other races, and 2.95% from two or more races. Hispanic or Latino of any race were 71.82% of the population.

There were 720 households, out of which 55.3% had children under the age of 18 living with them, 65.8% were married couples living together, 11.5% had a female householder with no husband present, and 19.2% were non-families. 16.1% of all households were made up of individuals, and 6.7% had someone living alone who was 65 years of age or older. The average household size was 3.53 and the average family size was 3.97.

In the city, the population was spread out, with 40.1% under the age of 18, 10.0% from 18 to 24, 28.3% from 25 to 44, 14.8% from 45 to 64, and 6.8% who were 65 years of age or older. The median age was 25 years. For every 100 females, there were 105.3 males. For every 100 females age 18 and over, there were 101.5 males.

The median income for a household in the city was $31,071, and the median income for a family was $33,409. Males had a median income of $27,450 versus $19,875 for females. The per capita income for the city was $9,922. About 20.4% of families and 23.1% of the population were below the poverty line, including 27.1% of those under age 18 and 24.6% of those age 65 or over.

== Education ==
The city is served by the Warden School District.
