= Coulee City, Washington =

Coulee City
- Town
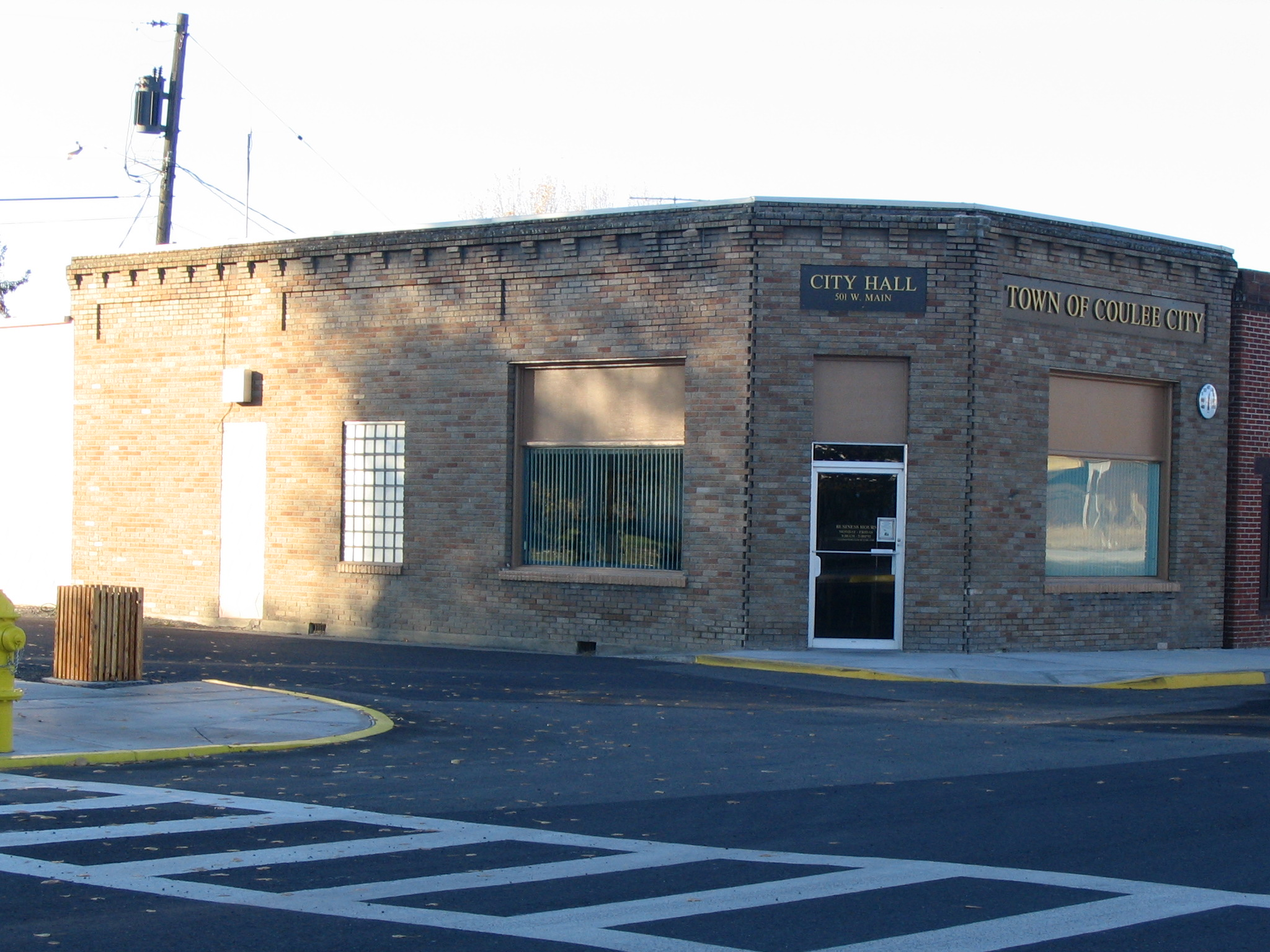
- City hall

- Location of Coulee City, Washington
- Coordinates: 47°37′12″N 119°17′15″W
- Country: United States
- State: Washington
- County: Grant

Government
  - Type: Mayor–council
  - Mayor: ShirleyRae Maes

Area
  - Total: 0.97 sq mi (2.50 km^{2})
  - Land: 0.92 sq mi (2.39 km^{2})
  - Water: 0.042 sq mi (0.11 km^{2})
- Elevation: 1,595 ft (486 m)

Population (2020)
  - Total: 549
  - Density: 610.3/sq mi (235.62/km^{2})
- Time zone: UTC-8 (Pacific (PST))
  - Summer (DST): UTC-7 (PDT)
- ZIP code: 99115
- Area code: 509
- FIPS code: 53-15080
- GNIS feature ID: 2413248

Coulee City is a town in Grant County, Washington. The population was 549 at the 2020 census.

== History ==
Coulee City was commonly known as McEntee’s Crossing of the Grand Coulee in the 19th century. In 1881, Philip McEntee, after helping a group of surveyors trying to lay down a road, built the first log cabin around Coulee City. Other important pioneers soon followed in the following years.

The town was named after nearby Grand Coulee. Coulee City was officially incorporated on May 10, 1907.

== Geography ==
Coulee City sits on the southern shore of Banks Lake, a man-made reservoir that stretches for 27 miles to Grand Coulee Dam. At Coulee City, water from the reservoir enters a system of irrigation canals taking it to Billy Clapp Lake to the south and then beyond across the broader Columbia Basin Project.

Dry Falls, site of a catastrophic and large prehistoric waterfall, is located about two miles southwest of Coulee City.

U.S. Route 2 passes through the town from west to east and intersects State Route 17, which provides north-south connections. State Route 155 has its southern terminus immediately east of town, and provides connections to the Grand Coulee Dam and surrounding communities to the northwest.

According to the United States Census Bureau, the town has a total area of 0.90 square miles (2.33 km^{2}), all of it land.

== Climate ==
Climate data for Coulee City, Washington
Month	Jan	Feb	Mar	Apr	May	Jun	Jul	Aug	Sep	Oct	Nov	Dec	Year
Record high °F (°C)	52 (11)	62 (17)	73 (23)	93 (34)	100 (38)	116 (47)	110 (43)	110 (43)	101 (38)	85 (29)	67 (19)	56 (13)	116 (47)
Mean daily maximum °F (°C)	34 (1)	41 (5)	52 (11)	62 (17)	71 (22)	79 (26)	89 (32)	87 (31)	78 (26)	63 (17)	44 (7)	33 (1)	61 (16)
Mean daily minimum °F (°C)	21 (−6)	25 (−4)	31 (−1)	35 (2)	42 (6)	48 (9)	55 (13)	55 (13)	48 (9)	37 (3)	27 (−3)	21 (−6)	37 (3)
Record low °F (°C)	−19 (−28)	−19 (−28)	4 (−16)	18 (−8)	24 (−4)	28 (−2)	34 (1)	31 (−1)	36 (2)	7 (−14)	−8 (−22)	−19 (−28)	−19 (−28)
Average precipitation inches (mm)	0.83 (21)	0.97 (25)	0.99 (25)	0.77 (20)	1.06 (27)	0.81 (21)	0.69 (18)	0.46 (12)	0.50 (13)	0.59 (15)	1.37 (35)	1.41 (36)	10.45 (268)

== Demographics ==
Historical population
Census	Pop.	Note	%±
1910	276		—
1920	472		71.0%
1930	420		−11.0%
1940	744		77.1%
1950	977		31.3%
1960	654		−33.1%
1970	558		−14.7%
1980	510		−8.6%
1990	568		11.4%
2000	600		5.6%
2010	562		−6.3%
2020	549		−2.3%
U.S. Decennial Census; 2020 Census

=== 2010 census ===
As of the 2010 census, there were 562 people, 265 households, and 150 families living in the town. The population density was 624.4 inhabitants per square mile (241.1/km^{2}). There were 331 housing units at an average density of 367.8 per square mile (142.0/km^{2}). The racial makeup of the town was 91.3% White, 2.1% Native American, 0.2% Asian, 1.6% from other races, and 4.8% from two or more races. Hispanic or Latino of any race were 3.4% of the population.

There were 265 households, of which 19.2% had children under the age of 18 living with them, 44.9% were married couples living together, 7.5% had a female householder with no husband present, 4.2% had a male householder with no wife present, and 43.4% were non-families. 37.0% of all households were made up of individuals, and 16.2% had someone living alone who was 65 years of age or older. The average household size was 2.10 and the average family size was 2.72.

The median age in the town was 49.1 years. 16.9% of residents were under the age of 18; 7.2% were between the ages of 18 and 24; 19% were from 25 to 44; 33.5% were from 45 to 64; and 23.5% were 65 years of age or older. The gender makeup of the town was 49.6% male and 50.4% female.

=== 2000 census ===
As of the 2000 census, there were 600 people, 271 households, and 162 families living in the town. The population density was 605.0 people per square mile (234.0/km^{2}). There were 351 housing units at an average density of 353.9 per square mile (136.9/km^{2}). The racial makeup of the town was 94.83% White, 1.00% African American, 0.83% Native American, 0.33% Asian, 0.50% Pacific Islander, 0.17% from other races, and 2.33% from two or more races. Hispanic or Latino of any race were 2.83% of the population.

There were 271 households, out of which 25.5% had children under the age of 18 living with them, 48.3% were married couples living together, 10.3% had a female householder with no husband present, and 39.9% were non-families. 36.2% of all households were made up of individuals, and 18.5% had someone living alone who was 65 years of age or older. The average household size was 2.21 and the average family size was 2.87.

In the town, the age distribution of the population shows 24.0% under the age of 18, 7.7% from 18 to 24, 21.7% from 25 to 44, 23.7% from 45 to 64, and 23.0% who were 65 years of age or older. The median age was 42 years. For every 100 females, there were 102.7 males. For every 100 females age 18 and over, there were 99.1 males.

The median income for a household in the town was $25,938, and the median income for a family was $42,500. Males had a median income of $31,375 versus $17,250 for females. The per capita income for the town was $14,411. About 14.9% of families and 22.1% of the population were below the poverty line, including 29.2% of those under age 18 and 11.7% of those age 65 or over.

== Education ==
The town is served by the Coulee-Hartline School District.

== Notable people ==
- Nat W. Washington, state representative
