= Bridgeport, Washington =

- City
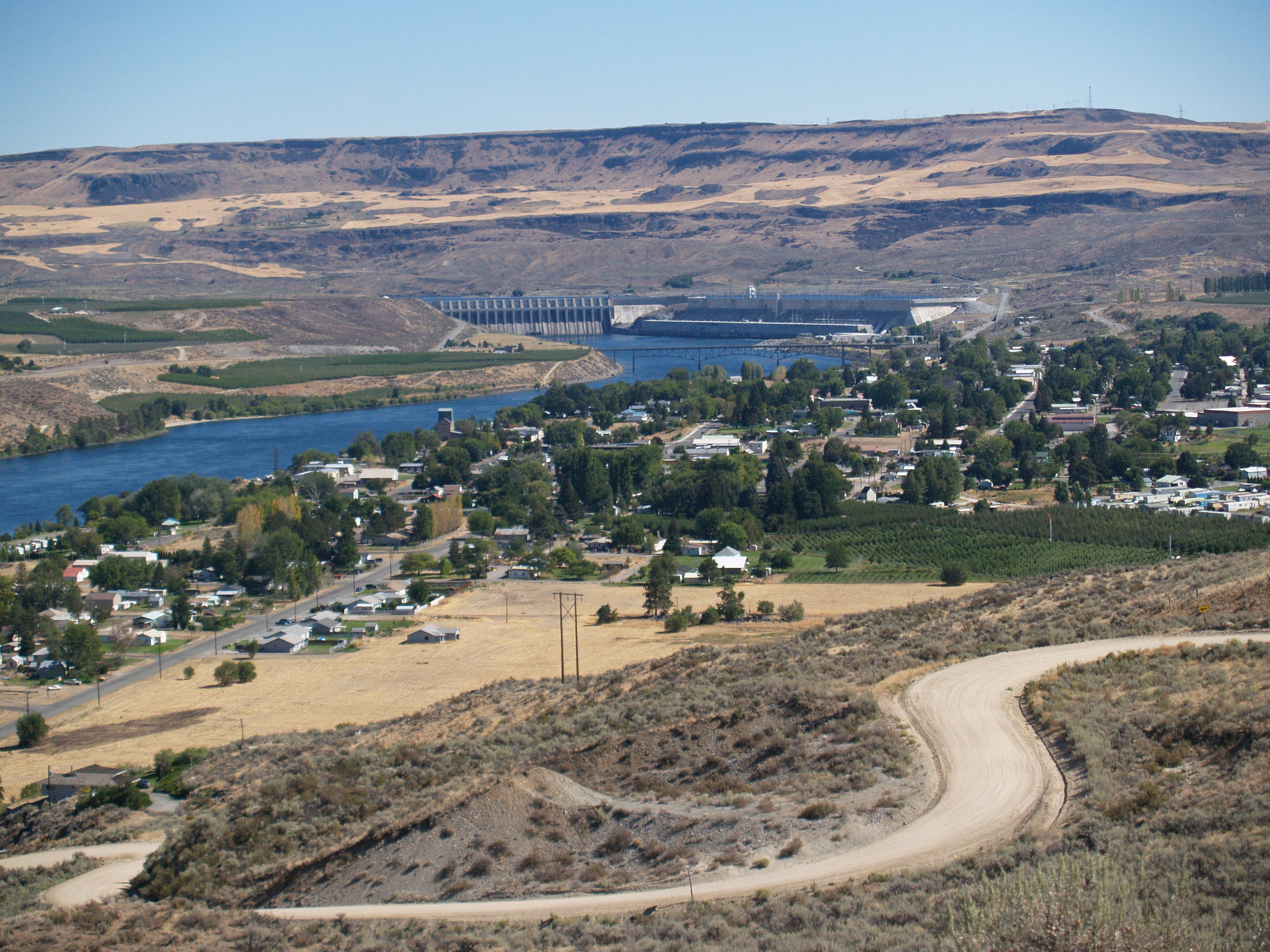
- Bridgeport, Washington, with Chief Joseph Dam in the background

- Location of Bridgeport, Washington
- Coordinates: 48°00′15″N 119°40′06″W
- Country: United States
- State: Washington
- County: Douglas

Government
  - Mayor: Sergio Orozco

Area
  - Total: 1.30 sq mi (3.36 km^{2})
  - Land: 1.07 sq mi (2.78 km^{2})
  - Water: 0.23 sq mi (0.59 km^{2})
- Elevation: 856 ft (261 m)

Population (2020)
  - Total: 2,141
  - Density: 1,990/sq mi (770/km^{2})
- Time zone: UTC-8 (Pacific (PST))
  - Summer (DST): UTC-7 (PDT)
- ZIP code: 98813
- Area code: 509
- FIPS code: 53-07870
- GNIS feature ID: 2409908
- Website: City of Bridgeport

Bridgeport is a city in Douglas County, Washington. It is part of the Wenatchee−East Wenatchee Metropolitan Statistical Area. Bridgeport's population was 2,141 at the 2020 census. Bridgeport is located near the Chief Joseph Dam.

== History ==
The area that is now Bridgeport was settled in the late 19th century and originally named Westfield. Some of the earliest settlers in the area were Chinese miners extracting gold from the banks of the Columbia River. Developers purchased the town in 1892 and renamed it Bridgeport after where they had come from, Bridgeport, Connecticut. The city of Bridgeport was officially incorporated on March 21, 1910. The biggest economic boom to come to the city came from the building of the massive Foster Creek Dam, later renamed the Chief Joseph Dam, just upstream from the city limits.

== Geography ==
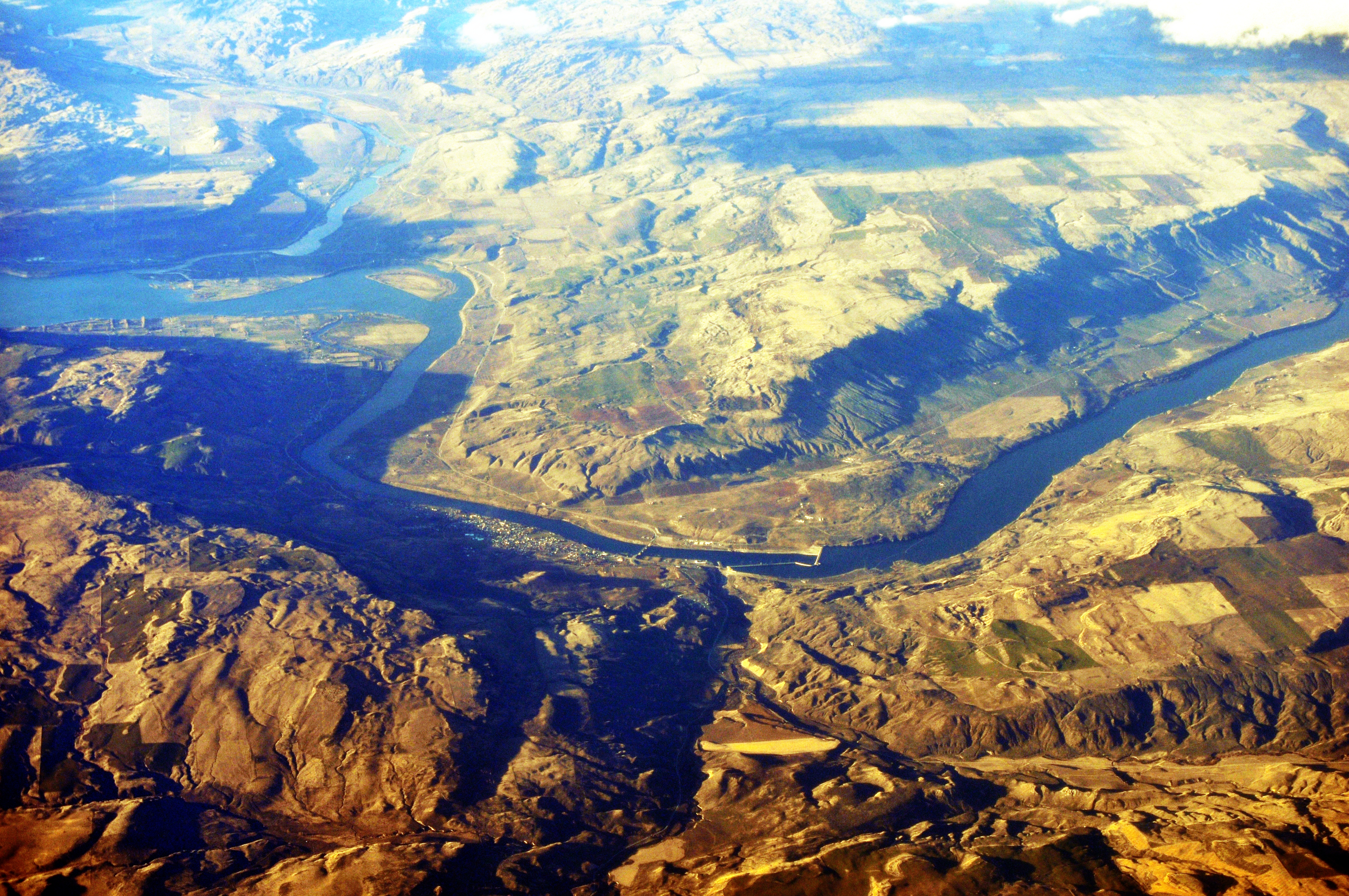
Aerial view of Bridgeport and environs

According to the United States Census Bureau, the city has a total area of 1.05 square miles (2.72 km^{2}), all of it land. Bridgeport has over 1½ miles of Columbia River Waterfront that is within the City Limits. Bridgeport is currently experiencing expansion and development of waterfront properties with a re-newed energy.

Chief Joseph Dam is located upstream about 1½ miles upstream from Bridgeport. Bridgeport is located directly adjacent to the Okanogan County border connected by the north-south Rufus Woods Lake. Its nearby recreational tourism destination is situated in Okanogan County north of the city.

=== Climate ===
Bridgeport was tied with Walla Walla for the former highest June temperature recorded in Washington state, at 113 °F (45 °C). Both cities set this record during the June 2015 northwest heat wave. This record was broken in 2021 when Hanford Site reached 120 °F (48.9 °C). Bridgeport recorded a record high of 115 °F (46.1 °C) on June 29, 2021.

Climate data for Chief Joseph Dam 1991–2020 normals, extremes 1949–present
Month	Jan	Feb	Mar	Apr	May	Jun	Jul	Aug	Sep	Oct	Nov	Dec	Year
Record high °F (°C)	64 (18)	64 (18)	78 (26)	93 (34)	103 (39)	115 (46)	110 (43)	110 (43)	103 (39)	91 (33)	75 (24)	59 (15)	115 (46)
Mean daily maximum °F (°C)	34.3 (1.3)	41.5 (5.3)	54.2 (12.3)	64.4 (18.0)	73.8 (23.2)	80.7 (27.1)	90.9 (32.7)	90.4 (32.4)	79.9 (26.6)	62.6 (17.0)	45.4 (7.4)	34.6 (1.4)	62.7 (17.1)
Mean daily minimum °F (°C)	22.7 (−5.2)	25.0 (−3.9)	31.5 (−0.3)	37.8 (3.2)	45.9 (7.7)	52.0 (11.1)	58.3 (14.6)	57.5 (14.2)	49.1 (9.5)	38.3 (3.5)	29.5 (−1.4)	23.2 (−4.9)	39.2 (4.0)
Record low °F (°C)	−19 (−28)	−19 (−28)	2 (−17)	16 (−9)	17 (−8)	28 (−2)	31 (−1)	35 (2)	29 (−2)	10 (−12)	−9 (−23)	−19 (−28)	−19 (−28)
Average precipitation inches (mm)	1.42 (36)	0.95 (24)	1.05 (27)	0.62 (16)	0.92 (23)	0.81 (21)	0.48 (12)	0.22 (5.6)	0.35 (8.9)	0.78 (20)	1.16 (29)	2.01 (51)	10.77 (273.5)
Average snowfall inches (cm)	8.5 (22)	3.1 (7.9)	0.6 (1.5)	0 (0)	0 (0)	0 (0)	0 (0)	0 (0)	0 (0)	0 (0)	2.2 (5.6)	13.5 (34)	27.9 (71)
Source: NOAA

== Demographics ==
Historical population
Census	Pop.	Note	%±
1910	431		—
1920	337		−21.8%
1930	305		−9.5%
1940	320		4.9%
1950	802		150.6%
1960	876		9.2%
1970	952		8.7%
1980	1,174		23.3%
1990	1,498		27.6%
2000	2,059		37.4%
2010	2,409		17.0%
2020	2,141		−11.1%
U.S. Decennial Census

=== 2020 census ===
As of the 2020 census, Bridgeport had a population of 2,141. The median age was 30.3 years. 33.2% of residents were under the age of 18 and 10.6% of residents were 65 years of age or older. For every 100 females there were 103.9 males, and for every 100 females age 18 and over there were 103.6 males age 18 and over.

0.0% of residents lived in urban areas, while 100.0% lived in rural areas.

There were 646 households in Bridgeport, of which 45.7% had children under the age of 18 living in them. Of all households, 51.7% were married-couple households, 17.2% were households with a male householder and no spouse or partner present, and 25.5% were households with a female householder and no spouse or partner present. About 19.5% of all households were made up of individuals and 7.9% had someone living alone who was 65 years of age or older.

There were 709 housing units, of which 8.9% were vacant. The homeowner vacancy rate was 0.3% and the rental vacancy rate was 8.9%.

Racial composition as of the 2020 census
Race	Number	Percent
White	514	24.0%
Black or African American	5	0.2%
American Indian and Alaska Native	59	2.8%
Asian	1	0.0%
Native Hawaiian and Other Pacific Islander	0	0.0%
Some other race	1,031	48.2%
Two or more races	531	24.8%
Hispanic or Latino (of any race)	1,743	81.4%

=== 2010 census ===
As of the 2010 census, there were 2,409 people, 673 households, and 525 families residing in the city. The population density was 2,294.3 inhabitants per square mile (885.8/km^{2}). There were 745 housing units at an average density of 709.5 per square mile (273.9/km^{2}). The racial makeup of the city was 57.4% White, 0.5% African American, 0.6% Native American, 0.4% Asian, 38.7% from other races, and 2.4% from two or more races. Hispanic or Latino of any race were 76.7% of the population.

There were 673 households, of which 54.4% had children under the age of 18 living with them, 57.5% were married couples living together, 13.1% had a female householder with no husband present, 7.4% had a male householder with no wife present, and 22.0% were non-families. 15.9% of all households were made up of individuals, and 8.2% had someone living alone who was 65 years of age or older. The average household size was 3.58 and the average family size was 4.00.

The median age in the city was 25.6 years. 37.4% of residents were under the age of 18; 11.7% were between the ages of 18 and 24; 26% were from 25 to 44; 16.7% were from 45 to 64; and 8.3% were 65 years of age or older. The gender makeup of the city was 52.3% male and 47.7% female.

=== 2000 census ===
As of the 2000 census, there were 2,059 people, 624 households, and 497 families residing in the city. The population density was 1,980.9 people per square mile (764.4/km^{2}). There were 762 housing units at an average density of 733.1 per square mile (282.9/km^{2}). The racial makeup of the city was 60.81% White, 0.24% African American, 1.94% Native American, 0.19% Asian, 0.10% Pacific Islander, 30.69% from other races, and 6.02% from two or more races. Hispanic or Latino of any race were 64.79% of the population.

There were 624 households, out of which 51.0% had children under the age of 18 living with them, 61.7% were married couples living together, 13.1% had a female householder with no husband present, and 20.2% were non-families. 17.1% of all households were made up of individuals, and 5.9% had someone living alone who was 65 years of age or older. The average household size was 3.30 and the average family size was 3.70.

In the city, the age distribution of the population shows 38.0% under the age of 18, 10.3% from 18 to 24, 28.1% from 25 to 44, 16.0% from 45 to 64, and 7.6% who were 65 years of age or older. The median age was 26 years. For every 100 females, there were 107.1 males. For every 100 females age 18 and over, there were 108.8 males.

The median income for a household in the city was $25,531, and the median income for a family was $26,086. Males had a median income of $22,333 versus $17,788 for females. The per capita income for the city was $10,302. About 28.9% of families and 33.2% of the population were below the poverty line, including 43.2% of those under age 18 and 4.3% of those age 65 or over.

== Education ==
The city is served by the Bridgeport School District.

== Notable people ==
- Clyde Pangborn, pioneering aviator
