= Ice Age Floods National Geologic Trail =

Network of routes connecting natural sites

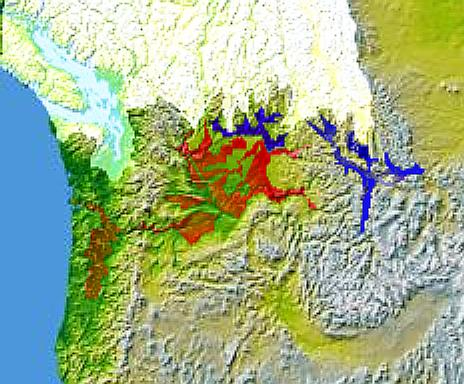
Glacial Lake Columbia (west) and Glacial Lake Missoula (east) are shown south of the Cordilleran Ice Sheet. The areas inundated in the Columbia and Missoula floods are shown in red.

The Ice Age Floods National Geologic Trail is a network of routes connecting natural sites and facilities that provide interpretation of the geological consequences of the Glacial Lake Missoula floods of the last glacial period that occurred about 18,000 to 15,000 years ago. It includes sites in Washington, Oregon, Idaho, and Montana. It was designated as the first National Geologic Trail in the United States in 2009.

== History ==
The National Park Service (NPS) commissioned an environmental assessment, which concluded that creation of a "National Geologic Trail—designating the Floods pathways managed by the National Park Service, with an Interagency Technical Committee representing the federal, tribal, and state agencies and a Trail Advisory Committee to assist the Trail Manager and staff" was the preferred option. Subsequently, the Omnibus Public Land Management Act of 2009 authorized establishing the Ice Age Floods National Geologic Trail in parts of Montana, Idaho, Washington, and Oregon and established NPS administration of the Trail.

== Geologic basis for the trail ==
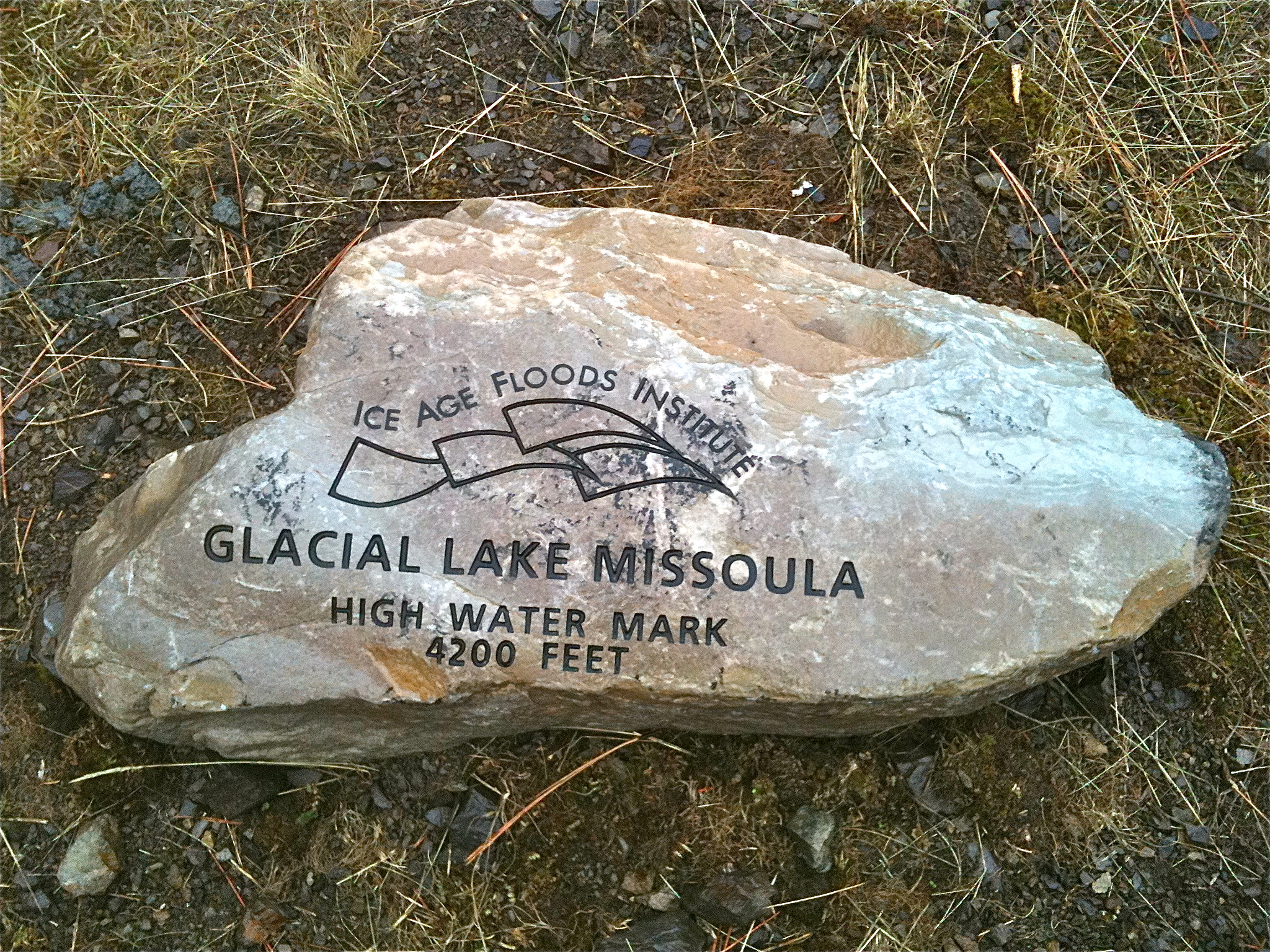
Glacial Lake Missoula high-water mark, 4200 ft.

At the end of the last Ice Age (the Wisconsonian Ice Age), a branch of the Cordilleran Ice Sheet moved out of Canada into the Idaho panhandle region. There it formed a 2,000 ft (610 m)-high ice dam that blocked the mouth of the Clark Fork River, creating glacial Lake Missoula, which impounded greater than 2,000 km^{3} (480 cu mi) of water. The lake extended up the valleys eastward for over 200 miles (320 km). The periodic rupturing of the ice dam resulted in the Missoula Floods – cataclysmic floods that swept across Idaho and Eastern Washington, and then down the Columbia River Gorge approximately 40 times during a 2,000 year period. The flood front swept in a wave across Idaho and Washington at speeds approaching 100 km/h (62 mph), and Glacial Lake Missoula drained in periods as short as 2 days.

The Columbia River channel downstream was blocked by the Okanogan lobe of the Cordilleran, impounding water in Glacial Lake Columbia. As a result, the floods could not continue down the Columbia River, being forced instead to flood over the highlands of Eastern Washington, vastly transforming the landscape by forming the Grand Coulee, Moses Coulee, the Channeled Scablands, Dry Falls, Palouse Falls and many similar features. The cumulative effect of the floods was to excavate 210 km^{3} (50 cu mi) of loess, sediment and basalt from the channeled scablands of eastern Washington and to transport it downstream. Over a period of 2,000 to 2,500 years, the repetition of ice dam failure and flood was repeated 40-60 times, leaving a lasting mark on the landscape.

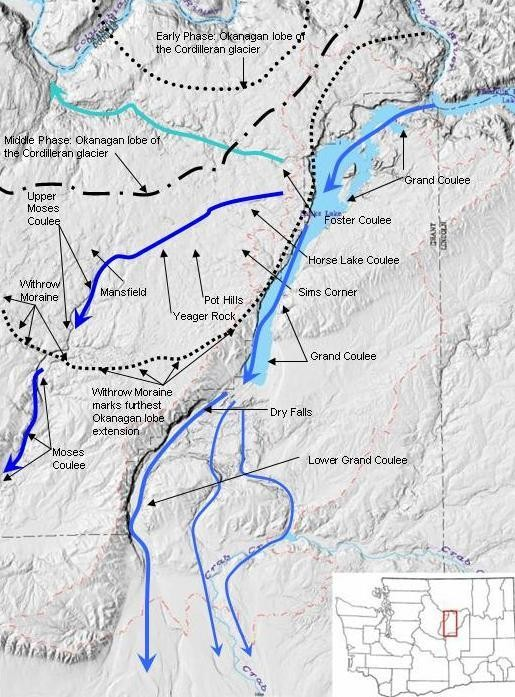
Illustration of the glacial flows leading to formation of several parts of the trail

There are a number of characteristic features that illustrate the effect of these ice dams and power of the resulting floods:

- Large portions of the scabland region of Eastern Washington were stripped bare of topsoil and left as the base basalt rock.
- The landscape is extensively eroded, with deep sheer-walled canyons in the Grand Coulee, Moses Coulee, the Wallula Gap, and the Columbia River Gorge.
- There are giant ripple marks 30 ft (9.1 m) high and gravel bars over 4 mi (6.4 km) long and 300 ft (91 m) high, which would have required extreme currents to form.
- There are 200 short tons (180,000 kg) erratic boulders which originated in Canada and Montana, found well up valleys such as the Willamette River valley far south of any evidence of glacial activity; these boulders were ice rafted in and deposited as the ice was stranded & melted in backwaters of temporary lakes.
- The scablands formed include deep kolks formed by local turbulence, which plucked basalt boulders out and excavated pits in the middle of relatively smooth plains.
- Backwaters of temporary lakes formed during the floods show extensive & periodic deposits of silt and sand.

== Trail features ==
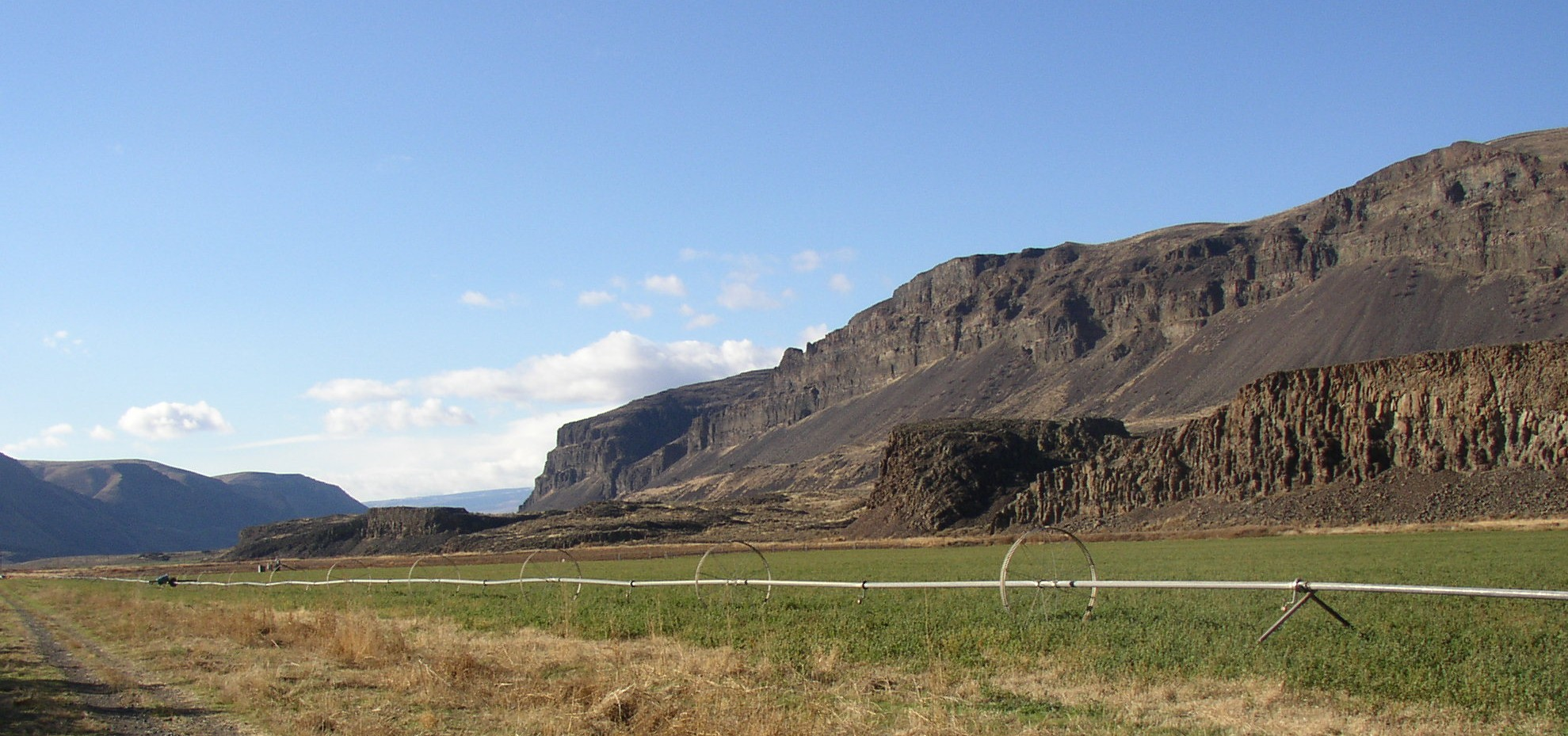
Moses Coulee at mid canyon

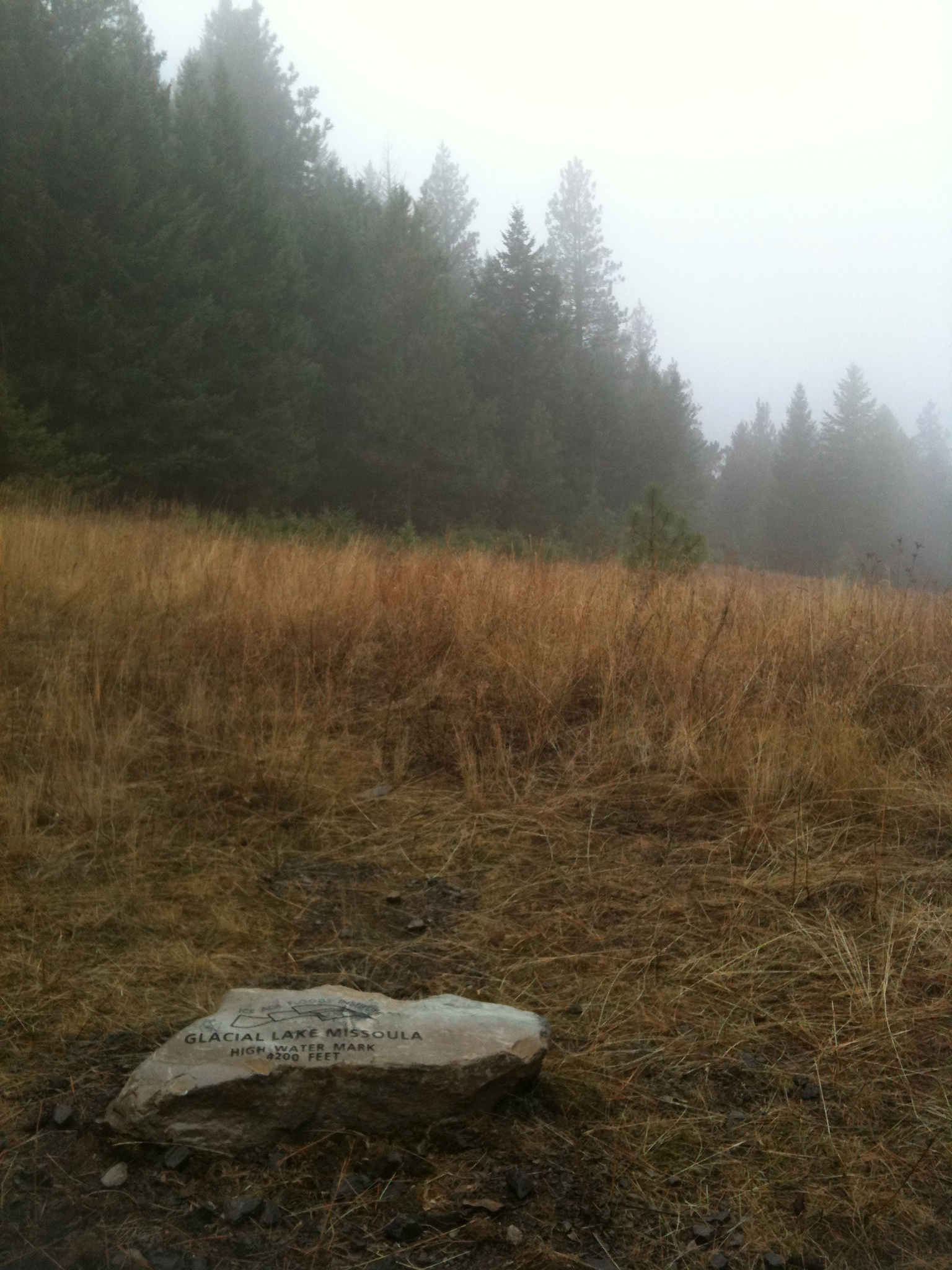
View from trail near Glacial Lake Missoula high-water mark, 4200 ft.

The trail comprises routes throughout the Pacific Northwest where the Ice Age Floods left a lasting impact. Regions and featured sites include

- The Glacial Lake Missoula region in Montana in which the waters were initially impounded
- The Lake Coeur d'Alene area and Clark Fork river of Idaho through which the flood waters periodically flowed
  - Farragut State Park
  - Lake Pend Oreille
- The Waterville Plateau in Washington state where the Okanagon lobe impounded Glacial Lake Columbia and diverted the flow through Moses Coulee, Grand Coulee and Dry Falls
  - The Withrow Moraine and Jameson Lake Drumlin Field
  - Boulder Park
  - Sims Corner Eskers and Kames
- Erosion features from the floods such as the Channeled Scablands, Drumheller Channels, Crab Creek, Corfu Slide and Palouse Falls in Washington
  - Sun Lakes-Dry Falls State Park
  - Ginkgo Petrified Forest State Park
  - Lyons Ferry State Park
  - Steamboat Rock State Park
- Temporary lakes such as Lake Lewis in Washington as well as Lake Condon and Lake Allison in Oregon and the evidence for these temporary lakes as seen in the ice rafted erratics and in the deposits of the Touchet Formation
  - Yakima Sportsman State Park
  - Bellevue Erratic
- Erosion features such as the Wallula Gap through the Horse Heaven Hills in southern Washington, the Columbia River Gorge on the border between Oregon and Washington and Alameda Ridge in Portland.
  - Columbia Hills State Park
  - Beacon Rock State Park
  - Multnomah Falls
  - Portland Women's Forum
  - Vista House

Several museums in the region feature local aspects of the natural history of the floods.

== See also ==
- Ice Age National Scientific Reserve
- Ice Age National Scenic Trail
