= List of National Natural Landmarks in Washington =

There are 18 National Natural Landmarks in the U.S. state of Washington, out of nearly 600 National Natural Landmarks in the United States.

Washington National Natural Landmarks (clickable map)

Name	Image	Date	Location	County	Ownership	Description
Boulder Park and McNeil Canyon Haystack Rocks		1986	47.878611°N 119.801667°W	Douglas	Federal, state	The most illustrative examples of glacial erratics in the United States.
Davis Canyon		1986	48.243775°N 119.751774°W	Okanogan	State, private	One of the largest and least disturbed examples of antelope bitterbrush-Idaho fescue shrub steppe remaining in the Columbia Plateau.
Drumheller Channels	Drumheller Channels	1986	46.975°N 119.196389°W	Adams, Grant	Federal, state, private	Illustrates the dramatic modification of the Columbia Plateau volcanic terrain by late Pleistocene catastrophic glacial outburst floods. Includes Columbia National Wildlife Refuge.
Ginkgo Petrified Forest	Ginkgo Petrified Forest	1965	46.948889°N 120.002778°W	Kittitas	State	Thousands of logs petrified in lava flows. Part of Ginkgo/Wanapum State Park.
Grand Coulee	Steamboat Rock	1965	47.766667°N 119.216667°W	Grant	Federal, state, private	An illustration of a series of geological events.
Grande Ronde Feeder Dikes		1980		Asotin	Private	The best example of basalt dikes, the congealed feeder sources of the Columbia River basalt plateau.
Grande Ronde Goosenecks		1980		Asotin	Federal	A 1,500-foot (460 m) deep canyon that follows a tortuous path along meanders.
The Great Gravel Bar of Moses Coulee		1986	47.458333°N 119.8°W	Douglas	State, private	Largest and best example of a pendent river bar formed by catastrophic glacial outburst floods that swept across the Columbia Plateau.
Kahlotus Ridgetop		2011		Franklin	State	The best remaining example of the Central Palouse Prairie grassland subtheme.
Mima Mounds		1966	46.89°N 123.05°W	Thurston	State	A prairie containing unusual soil pimples of black silt-gravel.
Nisqually Delta		1971	47.108611°N 122.703056°W	Pierce, Thurston	Federal, state, tribal, private	An unusually fine example of an estuarine ecosystem. Includes Nisqually National Wildlife Refuge.
Point of Arches		1980	48.2464503°N 124.7002419°W	Clallam	Federal	An outstanding exhibit of sea action in sculpturing a rocky shoreline. A unit of Olympic National Park.
Rose Creek Preserve		1984		Whitman	Private	The best remaining example of the aspen phase of the hawthorne-cow parsnip habitat type in the Columbia Plateau. Managed by The Nature Conservancy.
Sims Corner Eskers and Kames	Yeager Rock	1986	47.825°N 119.366667°W	Douglas	Federal, state, private	The best examples in the Columbia Plateau of landforms resulting from stagnation and rapid retreat of the ice sheet during the last glaciation.
Steptoe and Kamiak Buttes	Steptoe Butte	1965	47.0325°N 117.298611°W	Whitman	State, county, private	Isolated mountain peaks of older rock surrounded by basalt, rising above the surrounding lava plateau.
Umtanum Ridge Water Gap	View from Umptanum Ridge	1980	46.85°N 120.544444°W	Kittitas	Federal, state, private	Geologic formation that illustrates the processes of tectonic folding and antecedent stream cutting.
Wallula Gap	Wallula Gap	1980	46.044444°N 118.946667°W	Benton, Walla Walla	Federal, state, county, municipal	The largest and most spectacular of several large water gaps through basalt anticlines in the Columbia River basin.
Withrow Moraine and Jameson Lake Drumlin Field	Withrow Moraine	1980	47.6875°N 119.624722°W	Douglas	Federal, private	The best examples of drumlins and the most illustrative segment of the only Pleistocene terminal moraine in the Columbia Plateau

== See also ==
- List of National Historic Landmarks in Washington
