= List of National Historic Landmarks in Washington =

List of National Historic Landmarks in Washington may refer to:

- List of National Historic Landmarks in Washington (state)
- List of National Historic Landmarks in Washington, D.C.
