= List of National Historic Landmarks in Washington (state) =

This is a complete List of National Historic Landmarks in Washington. The United States National Historic Landmark program is operated under the auspices of the National Park Service, and recognizes structures, districts, objects, and similar resources nationwide according to a list of criteria of national significance. The state of Washington is home to 24 of these landmarks, extensively highlighting the state's maritime heritage (with eight individual boats) and contributions to the national park movement (including three sites within Mount Rainier National Park, which is also listed), while recognizing a range of other aspects of its historic legacy.

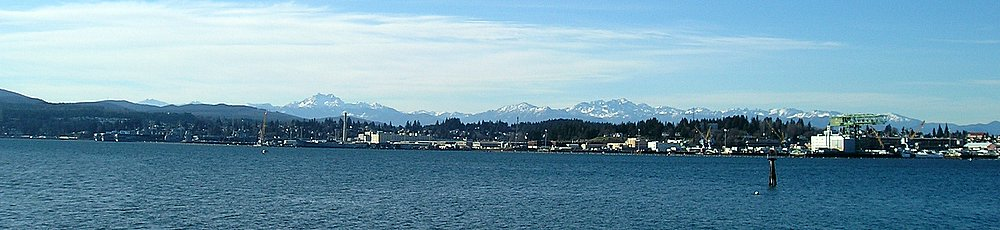
A view of the Puget Sound Naval Shipyard in Bremerton, a National Historic Landmark since 1992.

== Key ==
| | National Historic Landmark |
| ^{†} | National Historic Landmark District |
| ^{#} | National Historic Site, National Historical Park, National Memorial, or National Monument |
| ^{*} | Delisted Landmark |

== Current NHLs in Washington ==
The table below lists the 24 Washington sites (including one that spans the Washington-Oregon state line) that are currently designated as National Historic Landmarks, along with descriptions and other details.

| | Landmark name | Image | Date designated | Location | County | Description |
|---|---|---|---|---|---|---|
| 1 | ADVENTURESS (Schooner) | ADVENTURESS (Schooner) | April 11, 1989 (#89001067) | Port Townsend; 47°38′06″N 122°19′39″W | Jefferson | Built in 1913 as a yacht for private Arctic exploration, this schooner actually spent most of its career as a pilot boat at San Francisco. It is significant as an example of the work of the naval architect Bowdoin B. Crowninshield, who greatly influenced 20th century American yacht and schooner design. |
| 2^{#} | American and English Camps, San Juan Island | American and English Camps, San Juan Island | November 5, 1961 (#66000369) | Friday Harbor; 48°27′49″N 123°01′14″W | San Juan | Both of these camps were set up in 1859 as response to the hostilities of the Pig War. The camps were occupied for 12 years, until the Treaty of Washington was signed, negotiated by Kaiser Wilhelm I of Germany. The British abandoned their camp in November 1872, while the American camp was disbanded in July 1874. |
| 3 | ARTHUR FOSS (Tug) | ARTHUR FOSS (Tug) | April 11, 1989 (#89001078) | Seattle; 47°37′41″N 122°20′13″W | King | Built in 1889, the Arthur Foss is the oldest wooden-hulled tugboat afloat. She gained worldwide fame when the Metro-Goldwyn-Mayer movie studio leased the vessel for its 1933 production Tugboat Annie, starring Marie Dressler and Wallace Beery. In World War II, Arthur Foss was the last boat to escape before the Battle of Wake Island began in December 1941. |
| 4 | B Reactor | B Reactor | August 19, 2008 (#92000245) | About 5.3 miles (8.5 km) northeast of junction of State Route 24 and State Route 240 on the Hanford Site; 46°37′49″N 119°38′51″W | Benton | The B-Reactor at Hanford Site, Washington, was the first large scale plutonium production reactor ever built. The project was commissioned under the Manhattan Project, during World War II, to develop the first nuclear weapons. |
| 5^{†} | Bonneville Dam Historic District | Bonneville Dam Historic District | June 30, 1987 (#86000727) | North Bonneville, WA and Bonneville, OR; 45°38′38″N 121°57′42″W | Skamania, WA and Multnomah, OR | Built in the 1930s to harness the Columbia River for power generation, this was the first hydroelectric dam with a hydraulic drop sufficient to produce 500,000 kW of hydropower. The NHL district covers the dam and other elements of the federal dam project, including the #1 powerhouse, navigation lock, fish ladder, and hatchery. The site is also listed in Oregon. |
| 6^{#} | Chinook Point | Chinook Point | July 4, 1961 (#66000747) | Chinook; 46°15′07″N 123°55′23″W | Pacific | Captain Robert Gray became the first European to see the Columbia River at this location in 1792. His explorations gave the United States a strong position in its later territorial contests with Great Britain. |
| 7 | Duwamish (Fireboat) | Duwamish (Fireboat) | June 30, 1989 (#89001448) | Seattle; 47°39′50″N 122°23′39″W | King | Built in 1909, the Duwamish is the second-oldest boat in the US built specifically for firefighting. |
| 8 | Fireboat No. 1 | Fireboat No. 1 | June 30, 1989 (#83004254) | Tacoma; 47°17′12″N 122°29′22″W | Pierce | Built in 1929, Fireboat No. 1 is now in permanent dry dock in Tacoma. |
| 9 | Fort Nisqually Granary | Fort Nisqually Granary | April 15, 1970 (#70000647) | Tacoma; 47°18′13″N 122°31′58″W | Pierce | Established in 1833, Fort Nisqually was the first European trading post on Puget Sound. Both of these buildings have been moved to Point Defiance Park, and a replica of the original Fort Nisqually as a living museum. |
| 10^{†} | Fort Worden | Fort Worden | December 8, 1976 (#74001954) | Port Townsend; 48°07′59″N 122°45′55″W | Jefferson | Fort Worden was built during the Endicott period of US seacoast defense building. It is now a Washington state park. |
| 11 | Lightship No. 83 "SWIFTSURE" | Lightship No. 83 "SWIFTSURE" | April 11, 1989 (#75001852) | Seattle; 47°37′40″N 122°20′12″W | King | Built in 1904, Lightship No. 83 is the oldest surviving American lightvessel. Now moored at Northwest Seaport at Lake Union Park and re-named SWIFTSURE after the closest former lightship station to Seattle, it has been undergoing a comprehensive rehabilitation since 2008. |
| 12 | Longmire Buildings | Longmire Buildings | May 28, 1987 (#87001338) | Mount Rainier National Park; 46°44′56″N 121°48′34″W | Pierce | The three contributing buildings are the Service Station, the Community Building, and the third (former) Administration Building, and are examples of National Park Service Rustic architecture. |
| 13 | Marmes Rockshelter | Marmes Rockshelter | July 19, 1964 (#66000745) | Lyons Ferry; 46°36′52″N 118°12′09″W | Franklin | Despite being the fact that human remains at the site are the oldest that have been found in Washington, and at the time of excavation, the oldest set of remains found in North America, the site was submerged under water after the closing of the Lower Monumental Lock and Dam. |
| 14^{†} | Mount Rainier National Park | Mount Rainier National Park | February 18, 1997 (#97000344) | Mount Rainier National Park; 46°49′59″N 121°49′59″W | Pierce and Lewis | The National Park Service's master planning process at this national park in the 1920s marked a significant evolution in the professional management of scenic and recreational lands. The park retains most of the facilities that grew out of this pioneer plan. |
| 15 | Panama Hotel | Panama Hotel | March 20, 2006 (#06000462) | Seattle; 47°36′00″N 122°19′34″W | King | Built in 1910, this building holds the last remaining Japanese bathhouse (sento) in the United States. |
| 16 | Paradise Inn | Paradise Inn | May 28, 1987 (#87001336) | Mount Rainier National Park; 46°47′06″N 121°43′57″W | Pierce | Opened in 1917, and built in the National Park Service Rustic style of architecture. |
| 17 | Pioneer Building, Pergola, and Totem Pole | Pioneer Building, Pergola, and Totem Pole | May 5, 1977 (#77001340) | Seattle; 47°36′02″N 122°19′57″W | King | The Pioneer Building is a Richardsonian Romanesque building built in 1892. The Pergola was formerly a cable car stop built in 1909, and the Seattle Totem Pole, which was originally carved around 1790, was stolen from a Tlingit village, and presented to the city of Seattle by its Chamber of Commerce in 1899. |
| 18^{†} | Port Gamble Historic District | Port Gamble Historic District | November 13, 1966 (#66000746) | Port Gamble; 47°51′18″N 122°35′02″W | Kitsap | This company town was founded in 1853, and ran the longest running timber mill in the US, which just closed in 1995. Seattle architect Charles Bebb designed many of the town's buildings. |
| 19^{†} | Port Townsend | Port Townsend | May 5, 1977 (#76001883) | Port Townsend; 48°06′54″N 122°45′19″W | Jefferson | Formerly a prosperous customs station, this town retains a significant collection of 19th century commercial and residential buildings. |
| 20^{†} | Puget Sound Naval Shipyard | Puget Sound Naval Shipyard | August 27, 1992 (#88003053) | Bremerton; 47°33′32″N 122°38′17″W | Kitsap | This shipyard was the primary repair destination for damaged battleships during World War II. Of the eight ships bombed in the Japanese attack on Pearl Harbor, five were repaired here. |
| 21 | Seattle Electric Company Georgetown Steam Plant | Seattle Electric Company Georgetown Steam Plant | July 5, 1984 (#78002755) | Seattle; 47°32′01″N 122°19′18″W | King | Originally built in 1906 to power interurban rail transport between Seattle and Tacoma, the building is now a museum, and houses the only functioning Curtis Vertical Steam Turbogenerator in existence. |
| 22 | Virginia V (Steamboat) | Virginia V (Steamboat) | October 5, 1992 (#73001875) | Seattle; 47°37′48″N 122°22′54″W | King | Constructed in 1922, the Virginia V is the last functioning ship of the Puget Sound Mosquito Fleet, and the only "wooden-hull, steam-powered, passenger vessel" that operates on the West Coast of the United States. |
| 23 | W.T. Preston (Snagboat) | W.T. Preston (Snagboat) | May 5, 1989 (#72001270) | Anacortes; 47°39′51″N 122°23′44″W | Skagit | From 1929 to 1981, the Preston worked clearing rivers of debris, to make them passable to ship traffic. Today the boat is in permanent dry dock, and houses a museum. |
| 24 | Yakima Park Stockade Group | Yakima Park Stockade Group | May 28, 1987 (#87001337) | Mount Rainier National Park; 46°54′42″N 121°38′33″W | Pierce | Log building complex of four individual buildings in Mount Rainier National Park that is architecturally significant on its own. |

== Historic areas in the United States National Park System ==
National Historic Sites, National Historic Parks, National Memorials, and certain other areas listed in the National Park system are more highly protected than other historic sites, and are often not also named National Historic Landmarks. There are five of these in Washington (six are listed, but San Juan National Historic Park is already listed here as "American and English Camps"), which the National Park Service lists together with the National Historic Landmarks in the state.

| | Landmark name | Image | Date established | Location | City or Town | Summary |
|---|---|---|---|---|---|---|
| 1 | Ebey's Landing National Historical Reserve | | November 10, 1978 | Whidbey Island | Island County, Washington | The only National Historic Reserve, this park consists of a mixture of public and private lands, including the Central Whidbey Island Historic District, which is listed on the National Register. |
| 2 | Fort Vancouver National Historic Site | | June 19, 1948 | | Vancouver, Washington and Oregon City, Oregon | This site consists of the location of Fort Vancouver in Washington, and the house of John McLoughlin in Oregon City, Oregon. All the buildings at the fort burned in 1866, but were all rebuilt in their original places in 1966. |
| 3 | Klondike Gold Rush National Historical Park | | June 30, 1976 | | Skagway, Alaska and Seattle, Washington | This park, with units in Washington and Alaska, is part of the Klondike Gold Rush International Historical Park, along with British Columbia's Chilkoot Trail National Historic Site. |
| 4 | Nez Perce National Historical Park | Big Hole Battlefield | May 15, 1965 | | Sites in Idaho, Montana; Oregon and Washington | Of the 38 sites in this park that commemorates the history of the Nez Perce people, two are in Washington: the Burial Site of Chief Joseph the Younger and Nez Perce Campsites at Nespelem. |
| 5 | Whitman Mission National Historic Site | | June 29, 1936 | Walla Walla | Walla Walla | This was the site of a mission founded by Oregon Trail emigrants. In 1847, members of the Cayuse tribe killed thirteen of the settlers, prompting the US to annex the land as the Oregon Territory, and begin the Cayuse War. |

== Former NHL in Washington ==
In addition, there is one current National Historic Landmark that was once in Washington but was relocated to another state.

| | Landmark name | Image | Date of designation | Date of move | Locality | County | Description |
|---|---|---|---|---|---|---|---|
| 1 | USCGC Fir | Historic photograph of the lighthouse tender USCGC Fir at sea with the Cape Flattery Light in the background. | April 27, 1992 | September 2002 | Seattle (formerly); 47°35′18″N 122°20′19″W | King (formerly) | This lighthouse tender was the last working vessel in the fleet of the United States Lighthouse Service, the ancestors of today's Coast Guard buoy tenders. Built in 1939 and decommissioned in 1991, it is the last surviving ship of its type, and was largely unmodified at the time of its nomination. Fir was once expected to be a museum ship in Staten Island, New York, but was moved to California. In 2010 it was reported to be moored in San Francisco. |

== See also ==
- Historic preservation
- History of Washington
- National Register of Historic Places
- National Register of Historic Places listings in Washington
- List of National Natural Landmarks in Washington

== Sources ==
- Alanen, Arnold R.; Melnick, Robert (2000). Preserving Cultural Landscapes in America. JHU Press. ISBN 0-8018-6264-7.
- Brahms, William B. (2005). Notable Last Facts: A Compendium Of Endings, Conclusions, Terminations And Final Events Throughout History. Reference Desk Press. ISBN 0976532506.
- Brokenshire, Doug (1993). Washington State Place Names: From Alki to Yelm. Caxton Press. ISBN 0-87004-356-0.
- Carlson, Linda; Canell, Pamela (2003). Company Towns of the Pacific Northwest. University of Washington Press. ISBN 9780295983325.
- LeWarne, Charles (2003). Washington State. University of Washington Press. ISBN 0-295-97301-3.
- McKenna, Robert (2001). The Dictionary of Nautical Literacy. McGraw-Hill Professional. ISBN 0-07-141950-0.
- Robertson, Donald B. (1995). Encyclopedia of Western Railroad History. Caxton Press. ISBN 0-87004-366-8.
