= Sims Corner Eskers and Kames =

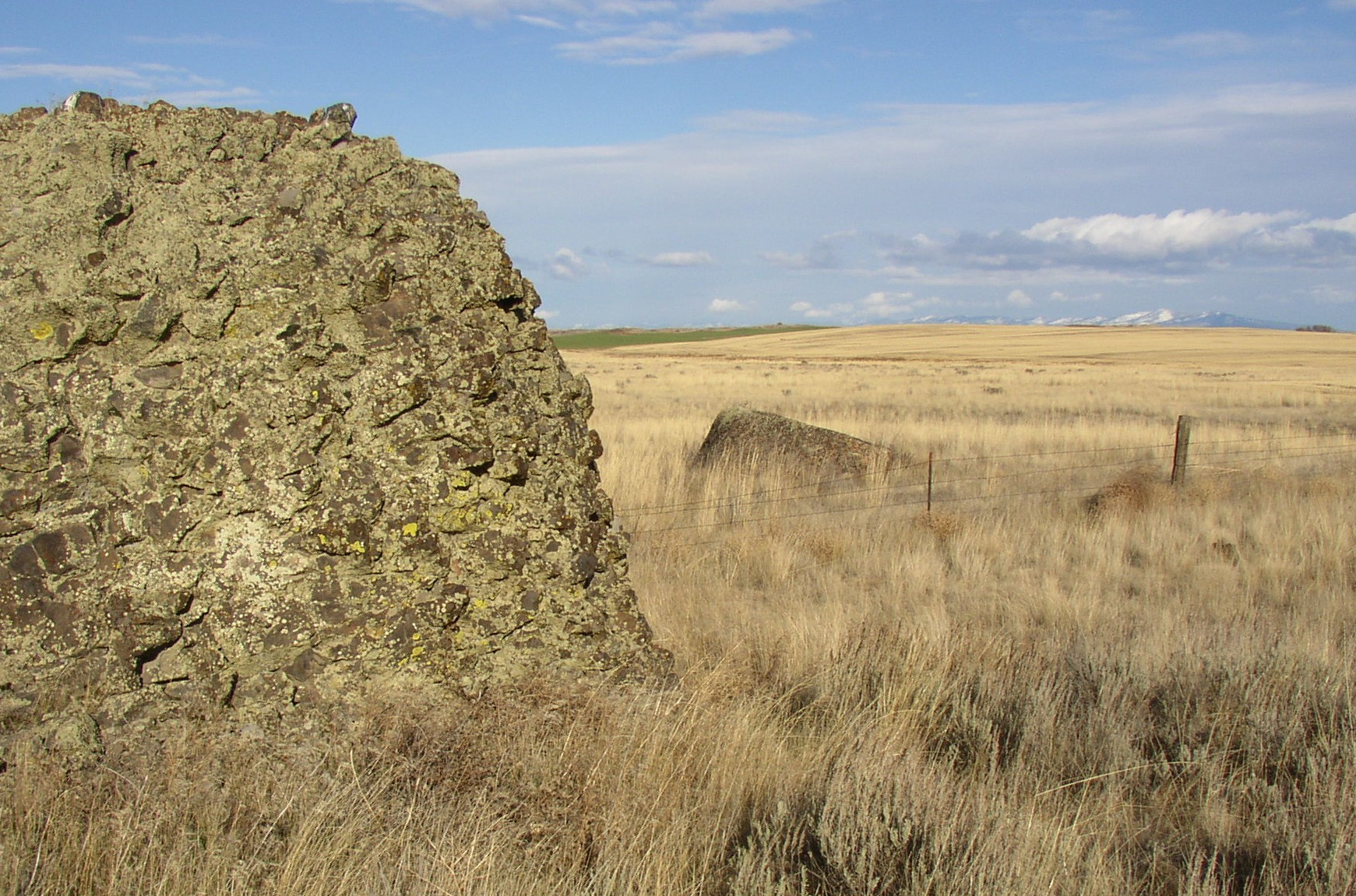
- Mixed erratics located near Sims Corner. The nearest is basalt, while the ones behind it are granite.

- Location within Washington (state)
- Location: north central Washington state
- Coordinates: 47°49′30″N 119°22′00″W
- Designated: 1986

Sims Corner Eskers and Kames National Natural Landmark of Douglas County, Washington, and nearby McNeil Canyon Haystack Rocks and Boulder Park natural landmarks, contain excellent examples of Pleistocene glacial landforms. Sims Corner Eskers and Kames National Natural Landmark includes classic examples of ice stagnation landforms such as glacial erratics, terminal moraines, eskers, and kames. It is located on the Waterville Plateau of the Columbia Plateau in north central Washington state in the United States.

== Geologic history ==
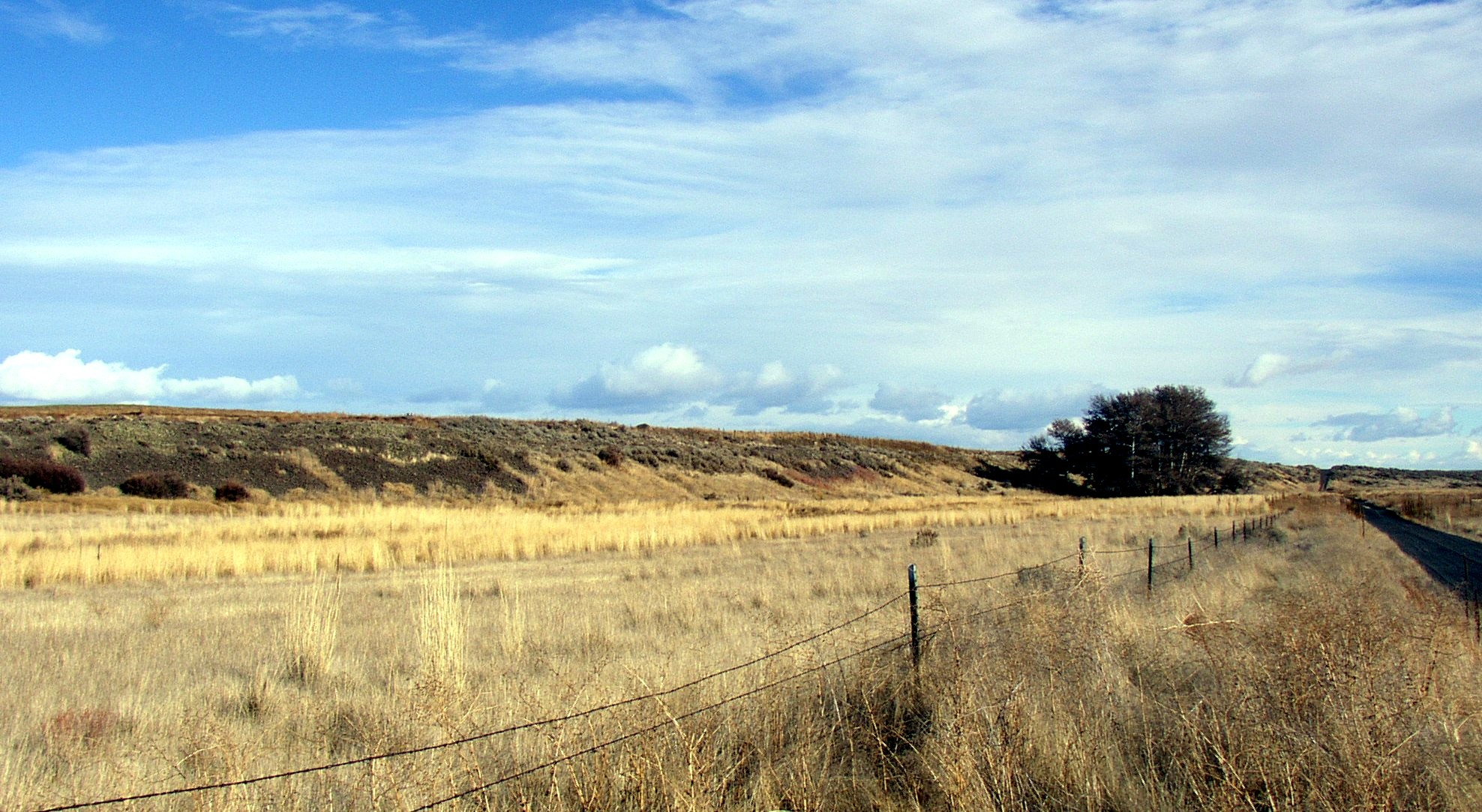
Esker near Sims Corner. Note trees next to esker and the single lane road crossing the esker to the right of the photo which provide scale.

=== The plateau ===
The Sims Corner Eskers and Kames National Natural Landmark is located on the Waterville Plateau, which lies in the northwest corner of the Columbia River Plateau. The plateau is formed on top of the Columbia River Basalt Group, a large igneous province that lies across parts of the states of Washington, Oregon, and Idaho in the United States of America. During the middle to late Miocene epoch, one of the largest flood basalts ever to appear on the earth's surface engulfed about 163,700 km^{2} (63,000 mile^{2}) of the Pacific Northwest, forming a large igneous province with an estimated volume of 174,300 km^{3}. Eruptions were most vigorous from 17–14 million years ago, when over 99% of the basalt was released. Less extensive eruptions continued from 14–6 million years ago.

These lava flows have been extensively exposed by the erosion resulting from the Missoula Floods, which laid bare many layers of the basalt flows on the edges of the plateau at Grand Coulee and Moses Coulee.

=== The glacial history ===
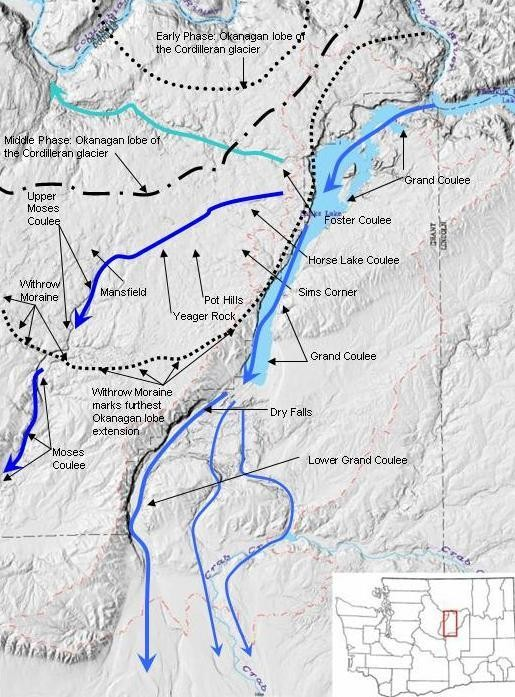
Illustration of the glacial impacts

Two million years ago the Pleistocene epoch began and ice age glaciers invaded the area. They scoured the Columbia River Plateau, reaching as far south as the middle of the Waterville Plateau highlands above the Grand Coulee and south to the head of Moses Coulee. In some areas north of the Grand Coulee they were as much as 3 km (10,000 feet) thick. Grooves in the exposed granite bedrock are still visible in the area from the movement of glaciers and numerous glacial erratics in the elevated to the northwest of the coulee.

=== Creation of the Foster Coulee, Moses Coulee, and Grand Coulee ===
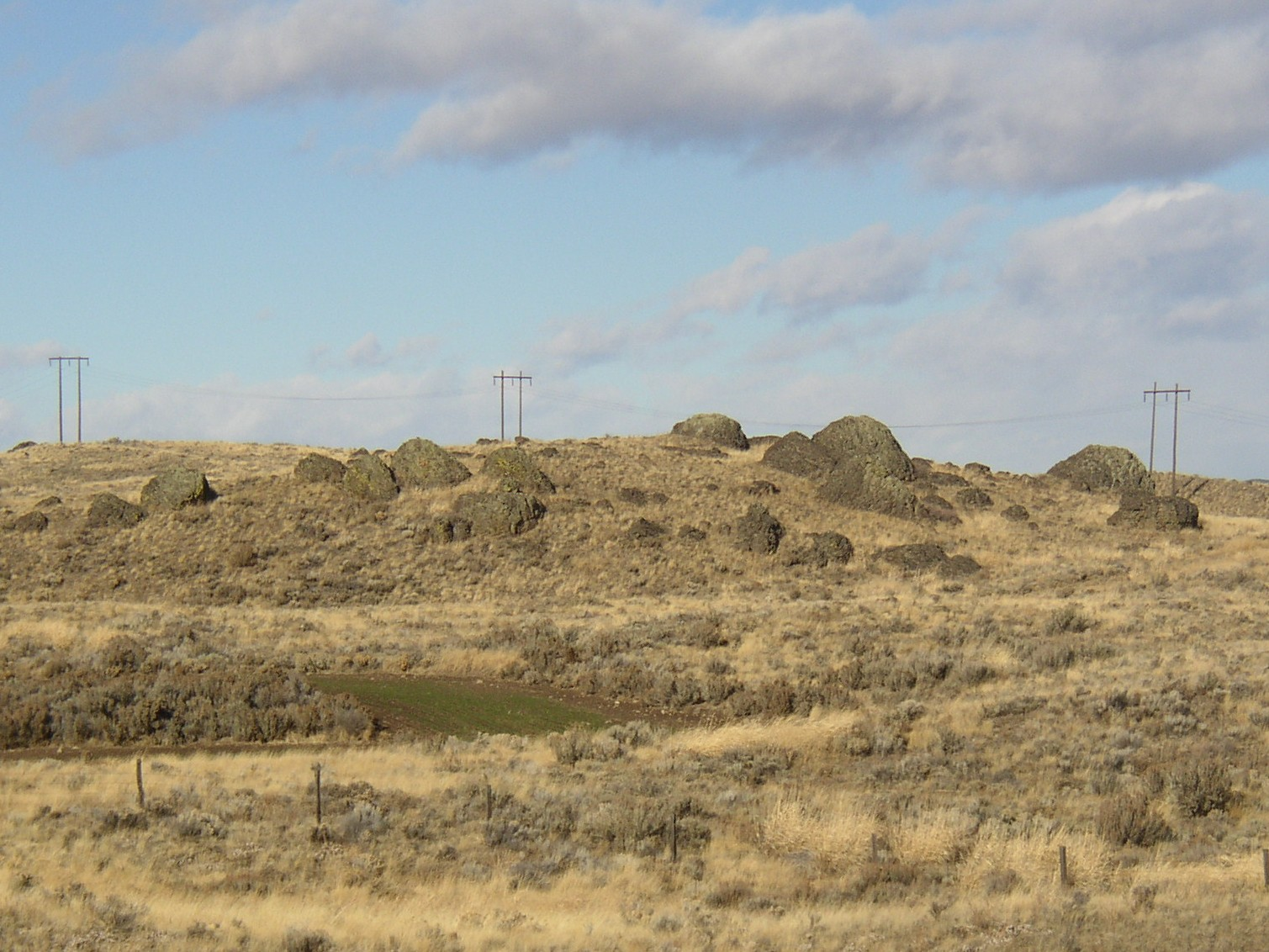
Terminal moraine with multiple erratics at the terminus of the Okanogan Lobe on the Waterville Plateau

The Okanogan lobe of the Cordilleran Ice Sheet moved down the Okanogan River valley and blocked the ancient route of the Columbia River, backing up water to create Glacial Lake Columbia. Initially water discharged from Glacial Lake Columbia by running up through the head of Grand Coulee and down through Foster Coulee to rejoin the Columbia River. As the glacier moved further south, Foster Coulee was cut off and the Columbia River then discharged through Moses Coulee, which runs southward slightly to the east of the ancient and current course of the Columbia. As the Okanogan lobe grew, it blocked Moses Coulee as well; the Columbia found the next lowest route through the region which was eroded to become the modern Grand Coulee. Flowing across the current Grand Coulee and Dry Falls regions, the ice age Columbia then entered the Quincy Basin and joined Crab Creek, following Crab Creek’s course southward past the Frenchman Hills and turning west to run along the north face of the Saddle Mountains and rejoin the previous and modern course of the Columbia River just above the main water gap in the Saddle Mountains, Sentinel Gap.

== See also ==
- List of National Natural Landmarks
- List of individual rocks
- Boulder Park National Natural Landmark, Douglas County, Washington

== Photo gallery ==
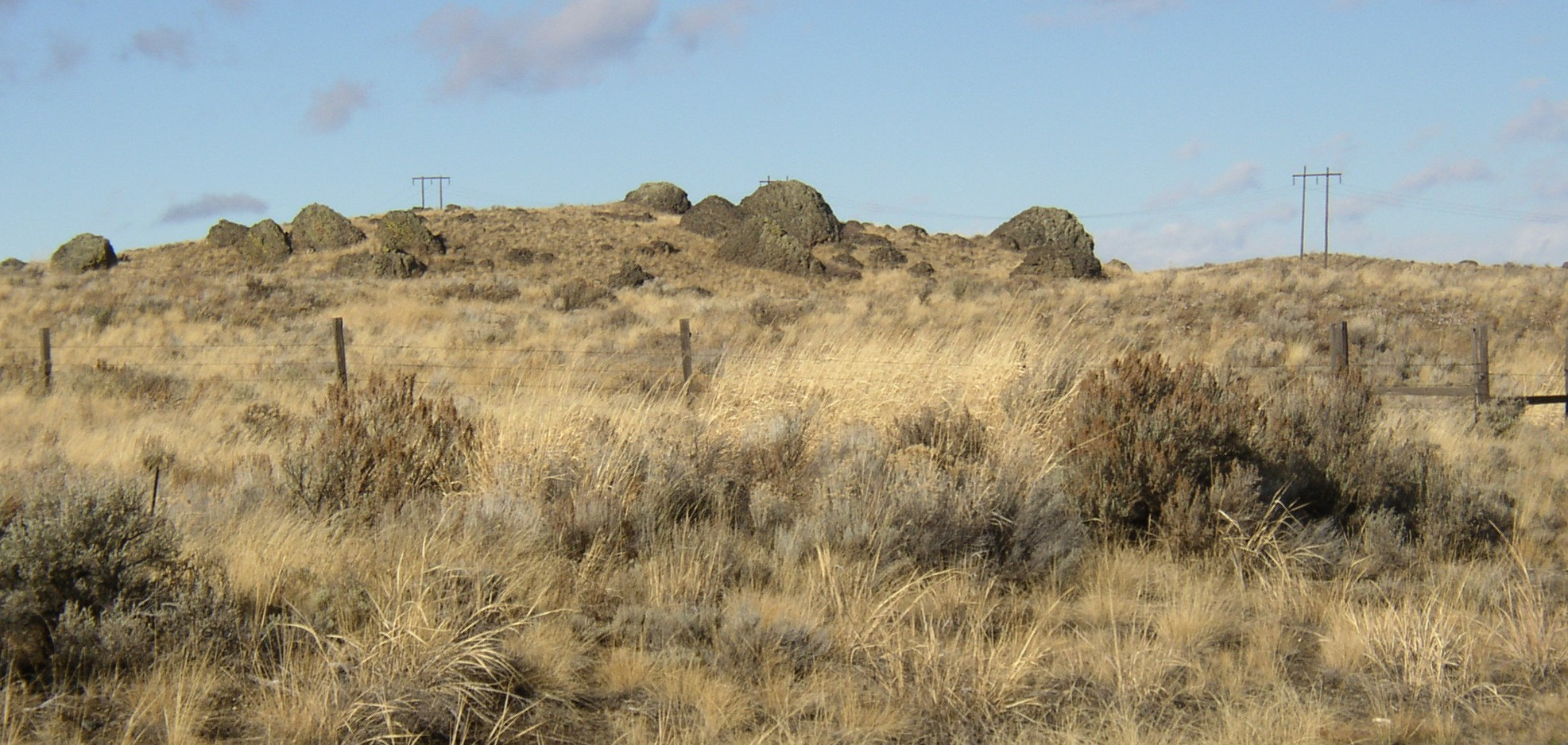
A kame among the glacial drift on the terminal moraine

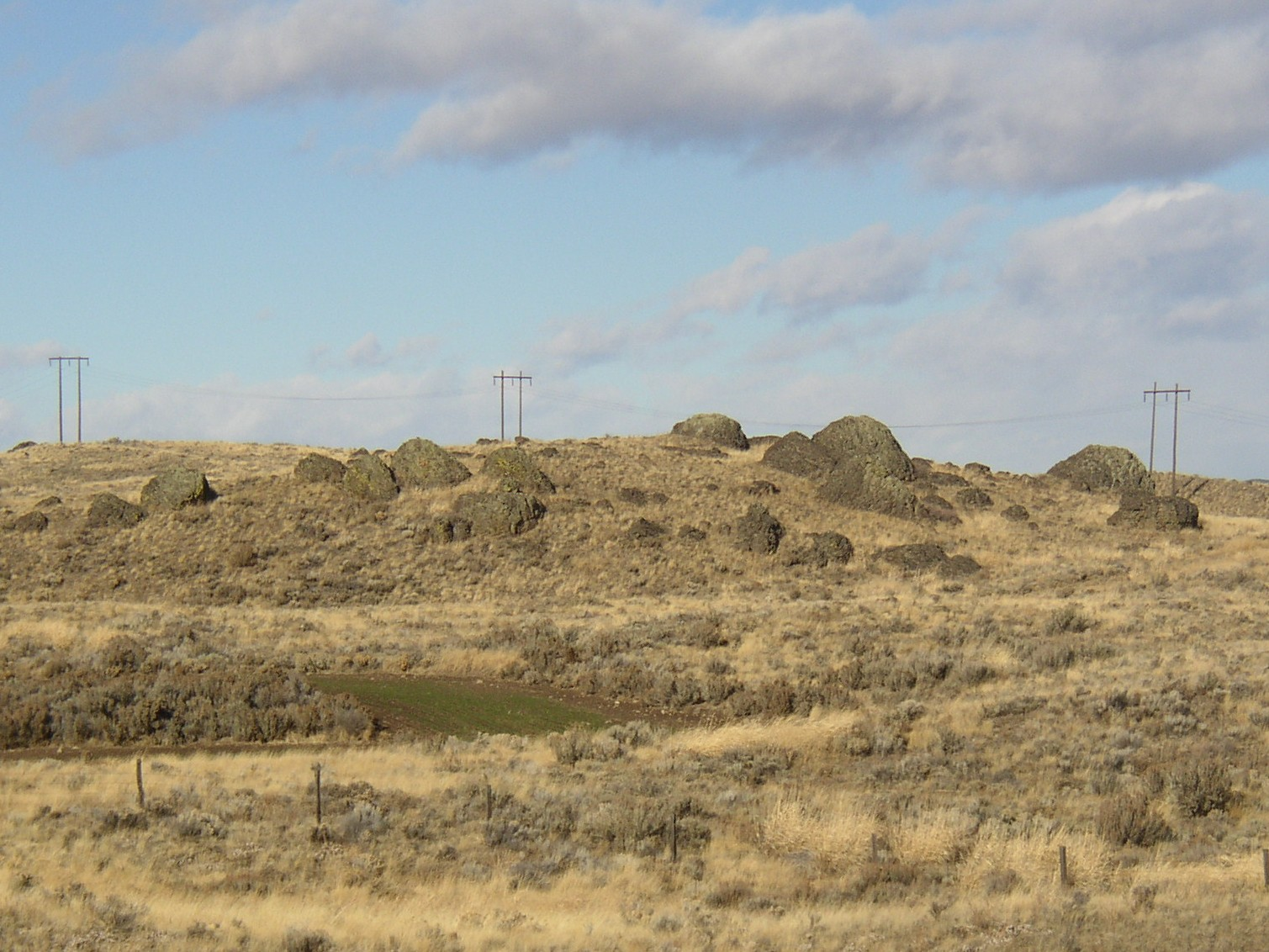
Terminal moraine (Withrow Moraine) of the Okanogan Lobe

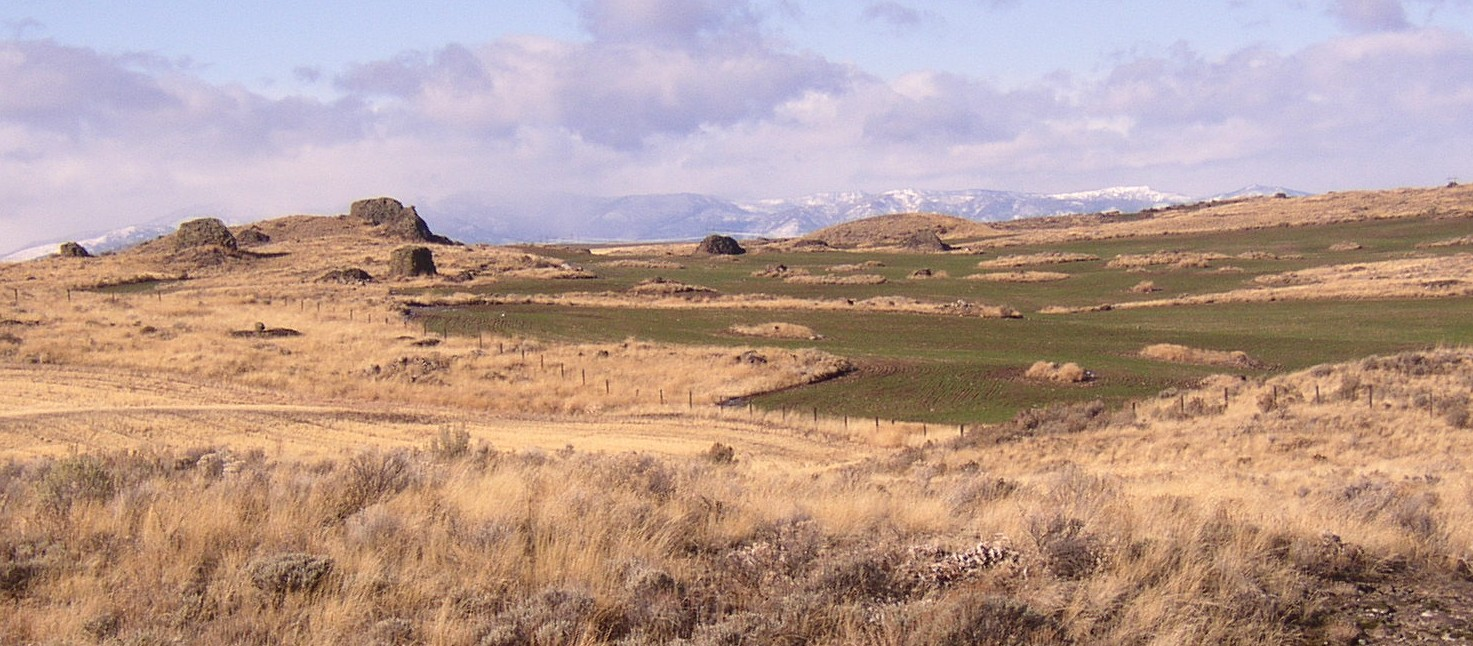
Multiple erratics on the terminal moraine of the Okanogan Lobe. Cascade mountains in the background.

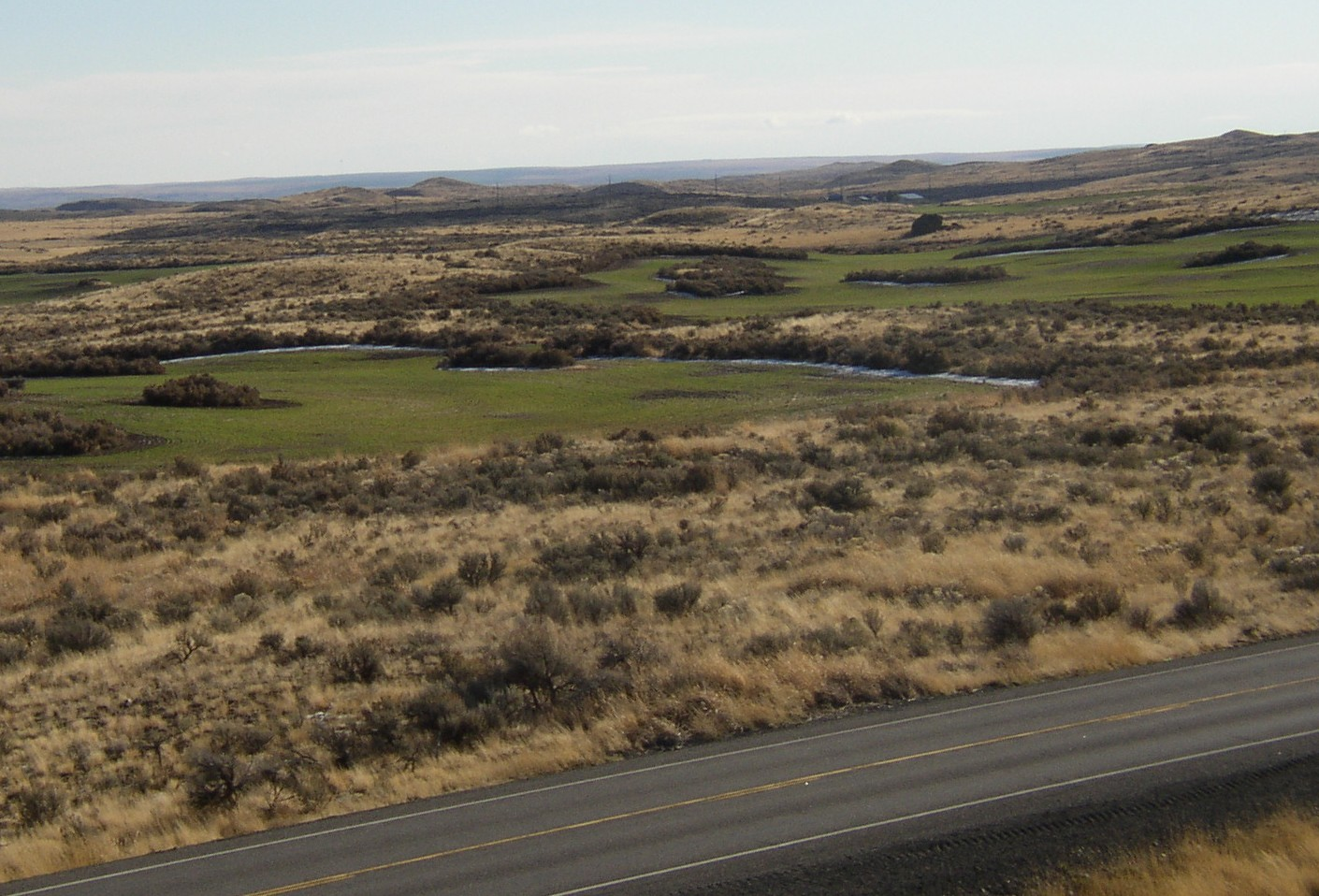
Multiple erratics on the terminal moraine of the Okanogan Lobe

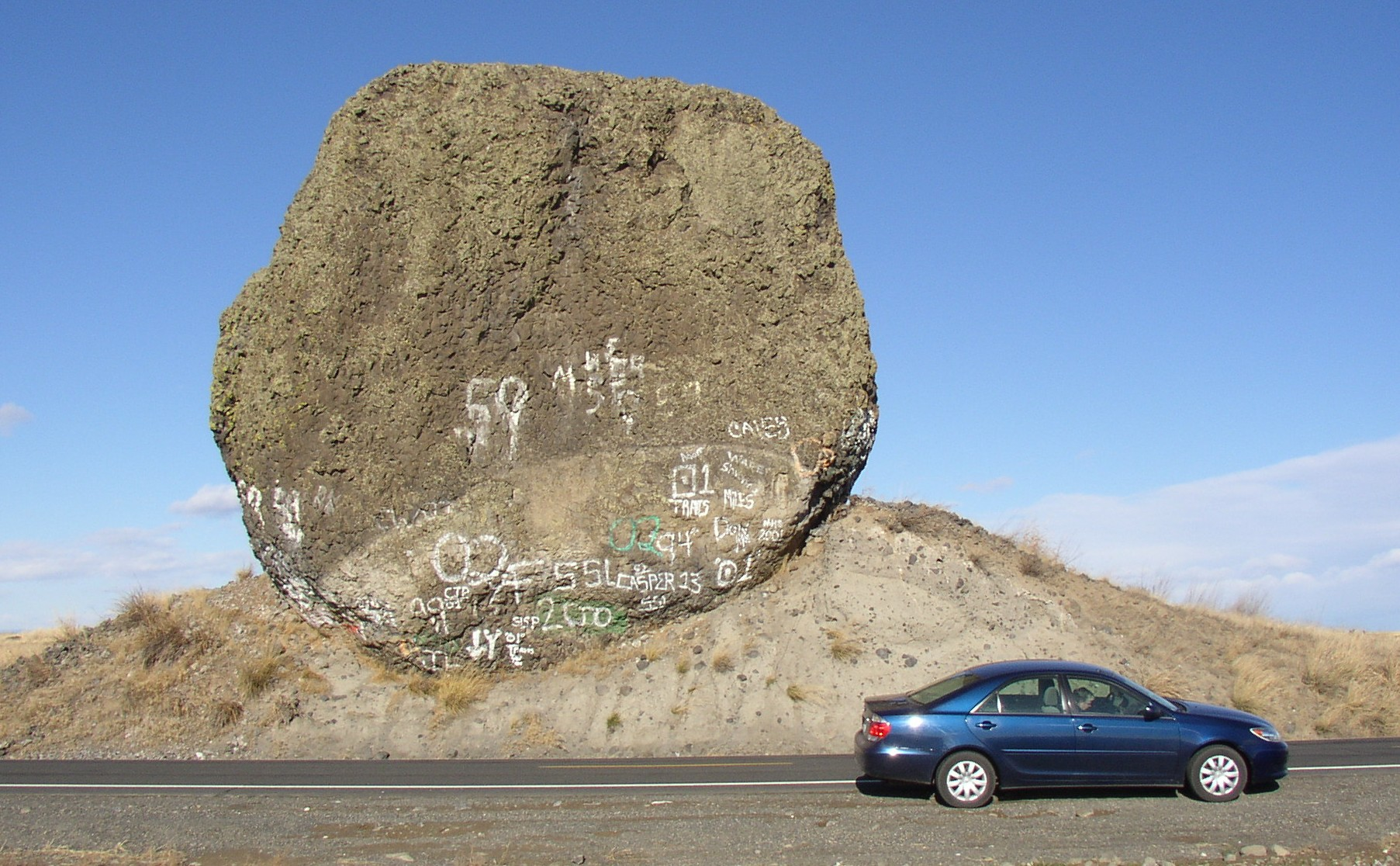
A glacial erratic called Yeager Rock, Waterville Plateau, Washington, US
