= Boulder Park =

Coordinates: 47°52′43″N 119°48′06″W

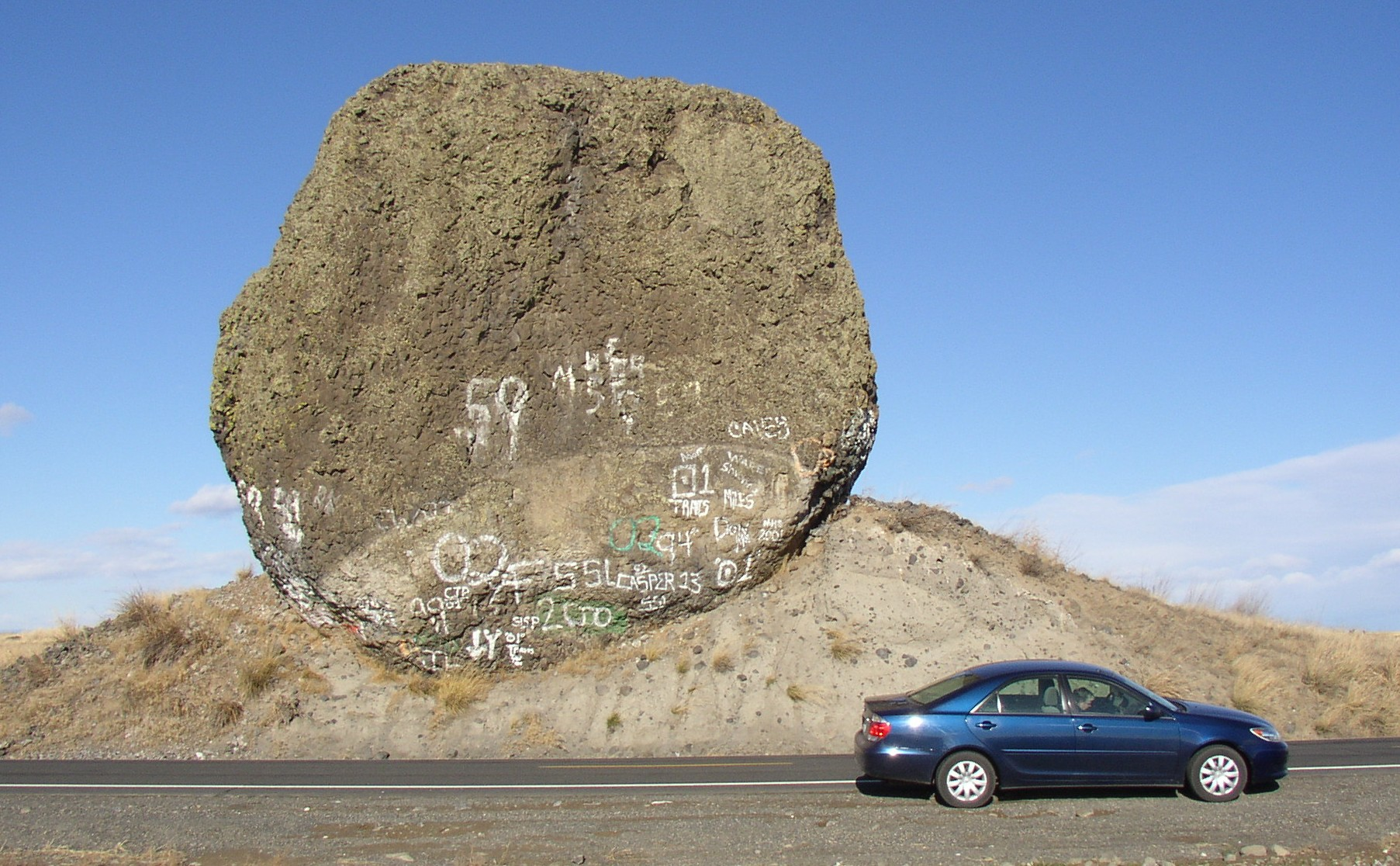
Yeager Rock, a haystack rock resting on ground moraine composed of glacial till on Waterville Plateau, Washington, USA

Boulder Park National Natural Landmark, of Douglas County, Washington, along with the nearby McNeil Canyon Haystack Rocks and Sims Corner Eskers and Kames natural landmarks, illustrate well-preserved examples of classic Pleistocene ice stagnation landforms that are found in Washington. These landforms include numerous glacial erratics and haystack rocks that occur near and on the Withrow Moraine, which is the terminal moraine of the Okanogan ice lobe.

== Geomorphology ==
Boulder Park is located on the Waterville Plateau of the Columbia Plateau in north central Washington state in the United States. It is a broad, dish-shaped upland basin that overall dips gently northward. The Waterville Plateau extends east from Columbia River to the Grand Coulee. This plateau is underlain by Columbia River Basalt that is covered by a discontinuous blanket of 14,000 to 20,000 year-old glacial deposits.

This park lies about 6 kilometers (3.7 mi) northeast and 17 kilometers (11 mi) north of the arcuate ridge of the Withrow Moraine. It marks the southern, 17,000 year-old terminus of the Okanogan ice lobe and southern margin of the Cordilleran Ice Sheet. Boulder Park and adjacent areas is covered by a discontinuous blanket of gravelly, sandy loam glacial till. These glacial deposits overlie and partially/completely fill Moses Coulee, a paleochannel cut by a pre-Wisconsin megaflood that predated the Last Glacial Maximum. It was cut by older Spokane Floods at a time prior to when the Okanogan ice lobe partially covered the Waterville Plateau during most of the last of the Last Glacial Maximum. At its maximum extent, this ice lobe was up to 300 meters (980 ft) thick and 40 kilometers (25 mi) wide. It effectively blocked most of the Columbia River Valley and created Glacial Lake Columbia.

The boulders for which this National Natural Landmark is named consist of glacial erratics and boulders known locally as haystack rocks that were transported southward by the Okanogan ice lobe of the Cordilleran ice sheet. The glacial erratics consist largely of granodiorite and gneiss that were transported southward. Haystack rocks consist of locally derived basaltic boulders. Because haystack rocks are identical to the local bedrock, they by definition cannot be classified as glacial erratics. Haystack rocks are blocks of basalt ripped from the entablature of the Columbia River Basalt Group by glacial ice of the Okanogan ice lobe. Preferential weathering along the joints of the entablature results in piles of talus, which together with the weathered erratics, that from a distance look like black haystacks. Some haystack rocks, e.g. Yeager Rock, are the size of large houses. The boulders provide important evidence for glacial erosion and transport, as well as marking the direction of movement and the terminus of the Okanogan ice lobe and the southern margin of the Cordilleran ice sheet during the Last Glacial Maximum.

Underlying the glacial deposits of the Okanogan ice lobe and outcropping, where it is absent, is the middle Miocene, Priest Rapids Member of the Wanapum Basalt. Within the area of this park, it consists of grayish-black, fine- to coarse-grained basalt lava flows that contain scattered, fine-grained phenocrysts of either plagioclase or plagioclase and olivine. The Wanapum Basalt is part of the late Miocene and early Pliocene Columbia River Basalt Group. This group covers parts of the states of Washington, Oregon, and Idaho in the United States of America. It forms a large igneous province that covers an area of 163,700 km^{2} (63,000 mile^{2}) of the Pacific Northwest with an estimated volume of 174,300 km^{3} of basalt lava and other volcanics. Eruptions were most vigorous between 17 and 14 million years ago, when over 99% of the basalt was released. Less extensive eruptions continued between 14 and 6 million years ago.

== See also ==
- List of National Natural Landmarks in Washington State

== Photo gallery ==
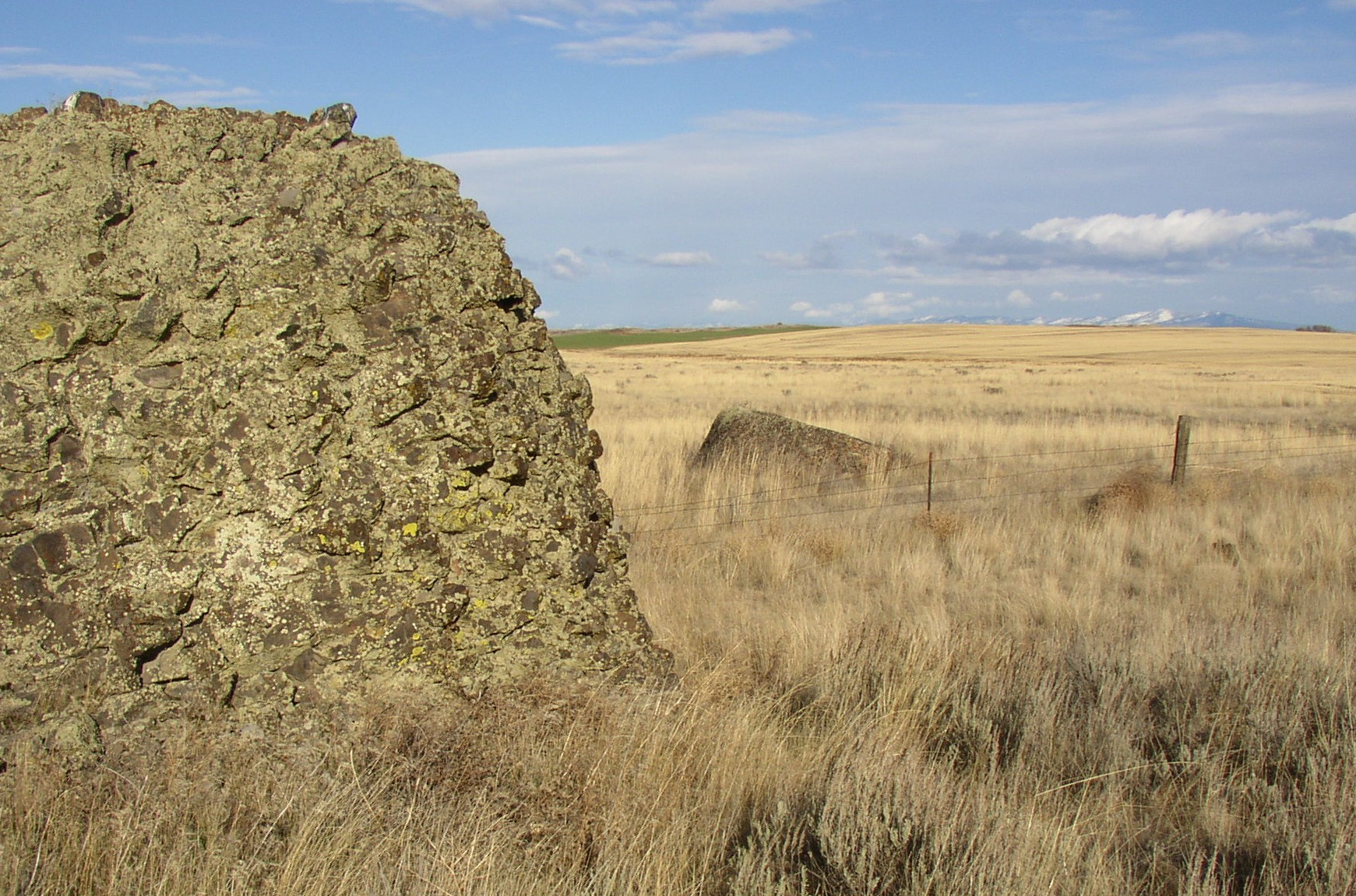
Mixed erratics located near Sims Corner. The nearest is basalt, which the ones behind it are granite.

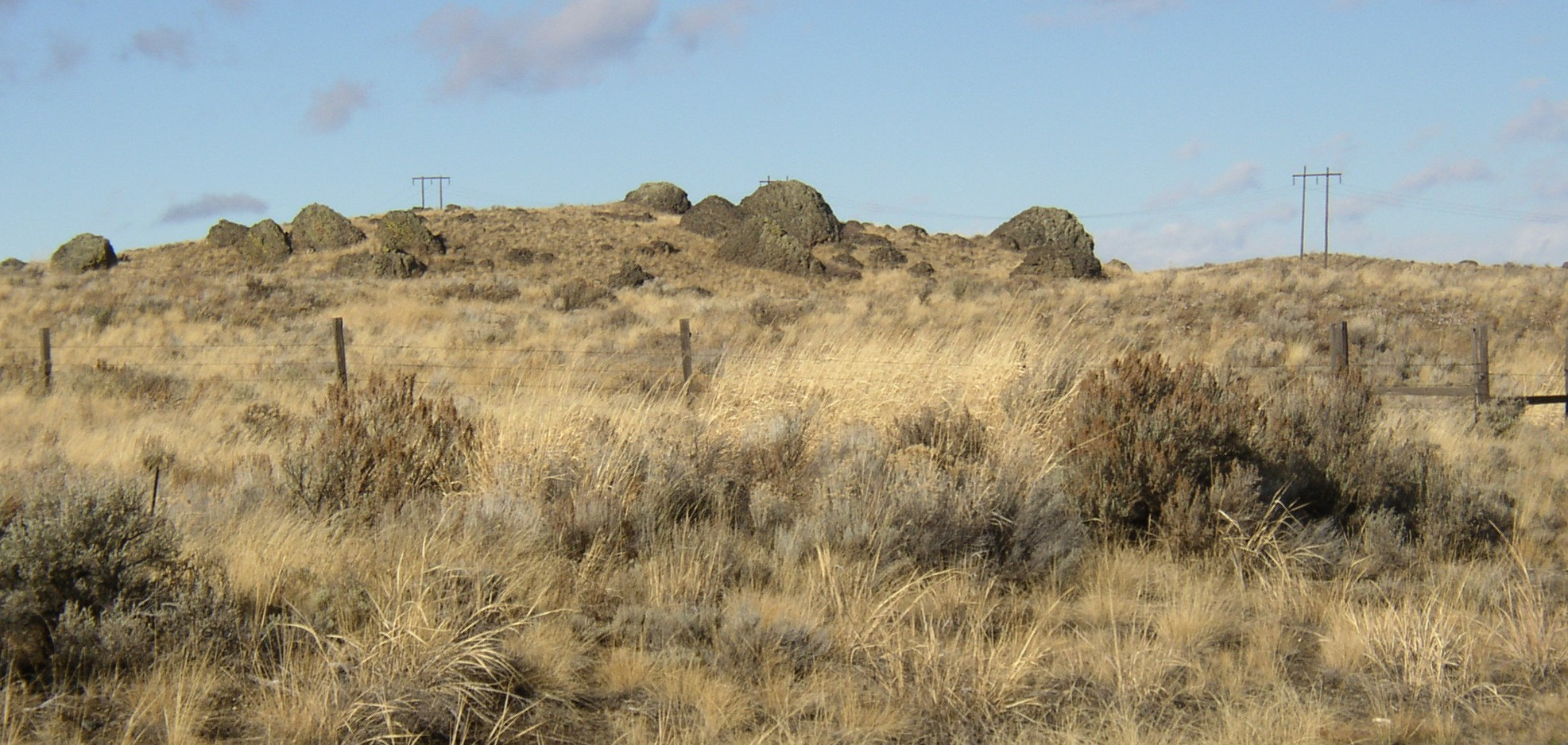
A kame among the glacial drift on the terminal moraine.

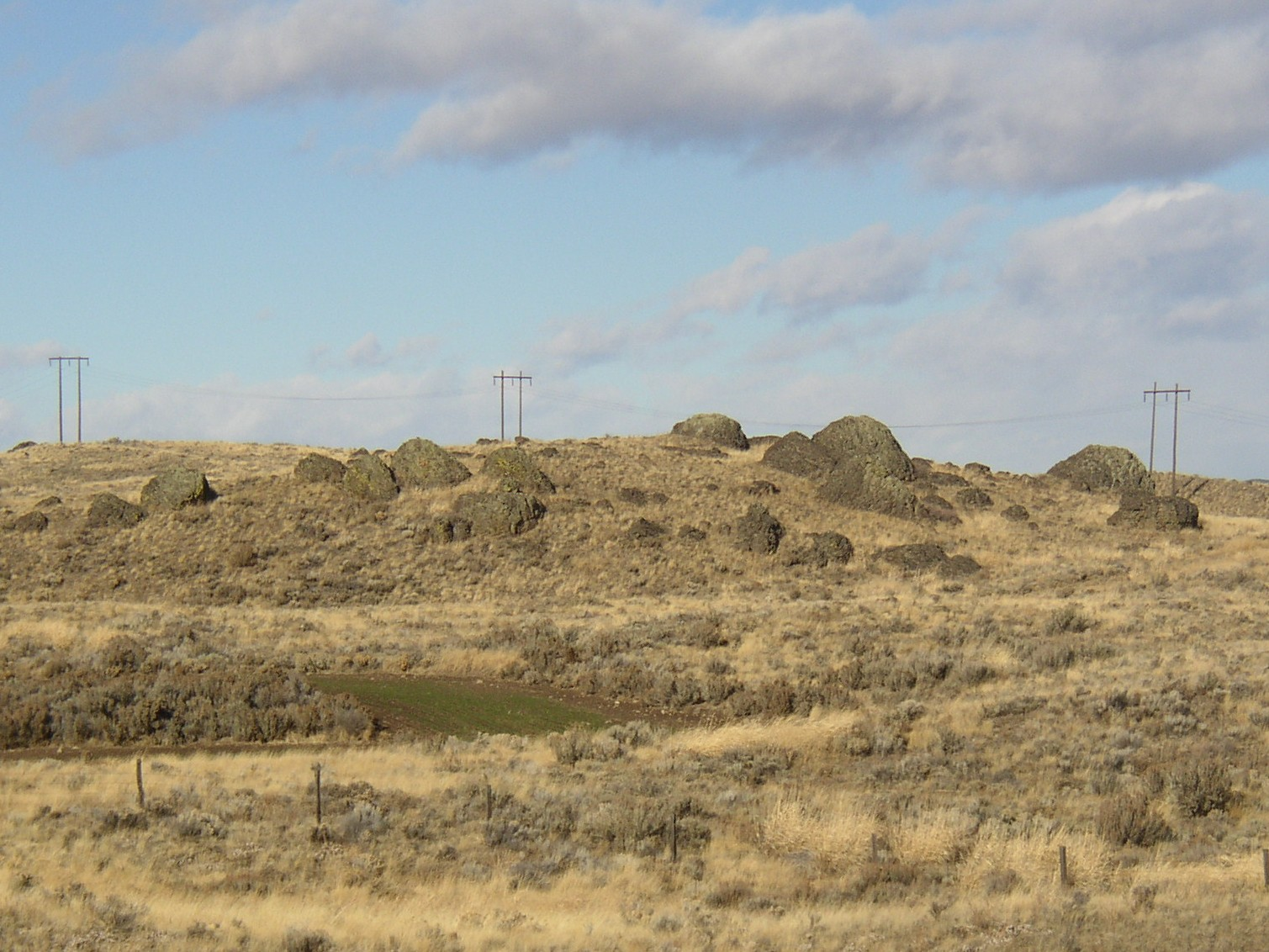
Terminal moraine (Withrow Moraine) of the Okanagon Lobe

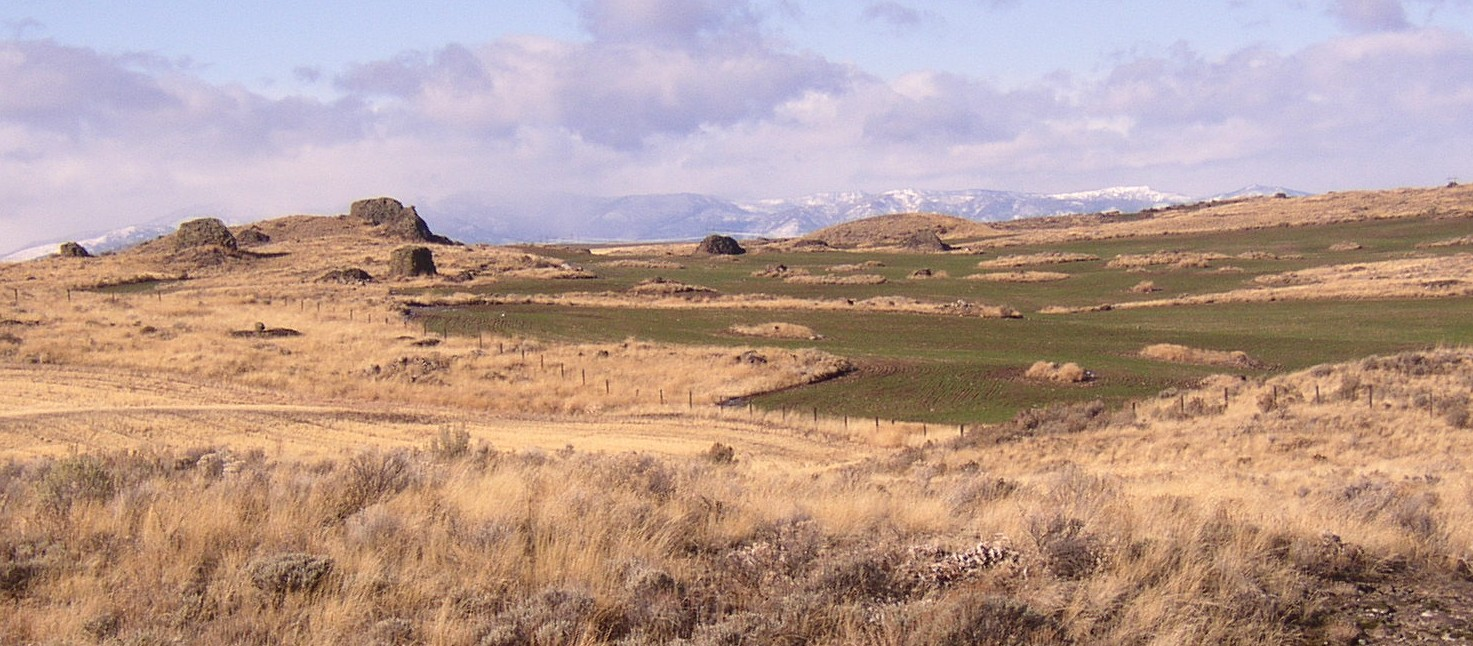
Multiple erratics on the terminal moraine of the Okanagon Lobe. Cascade mountains in the background.

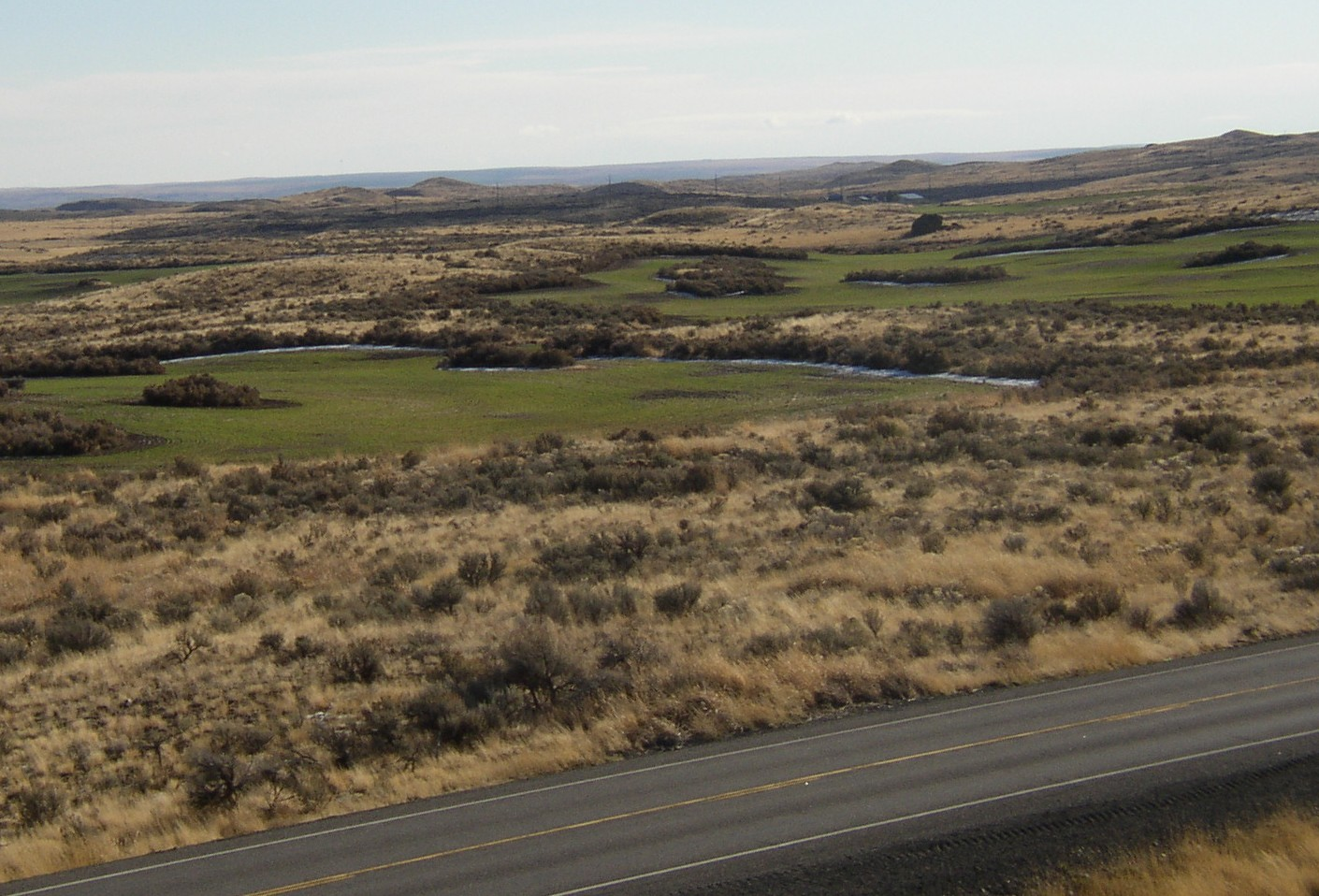
Multiple erratics on the terminal moraine of the Okanagon Lobe.
