= Withrow Moraine and Jameson Lake Drumlin Field =

United States National Natural Landmark in Douglas County, Washington

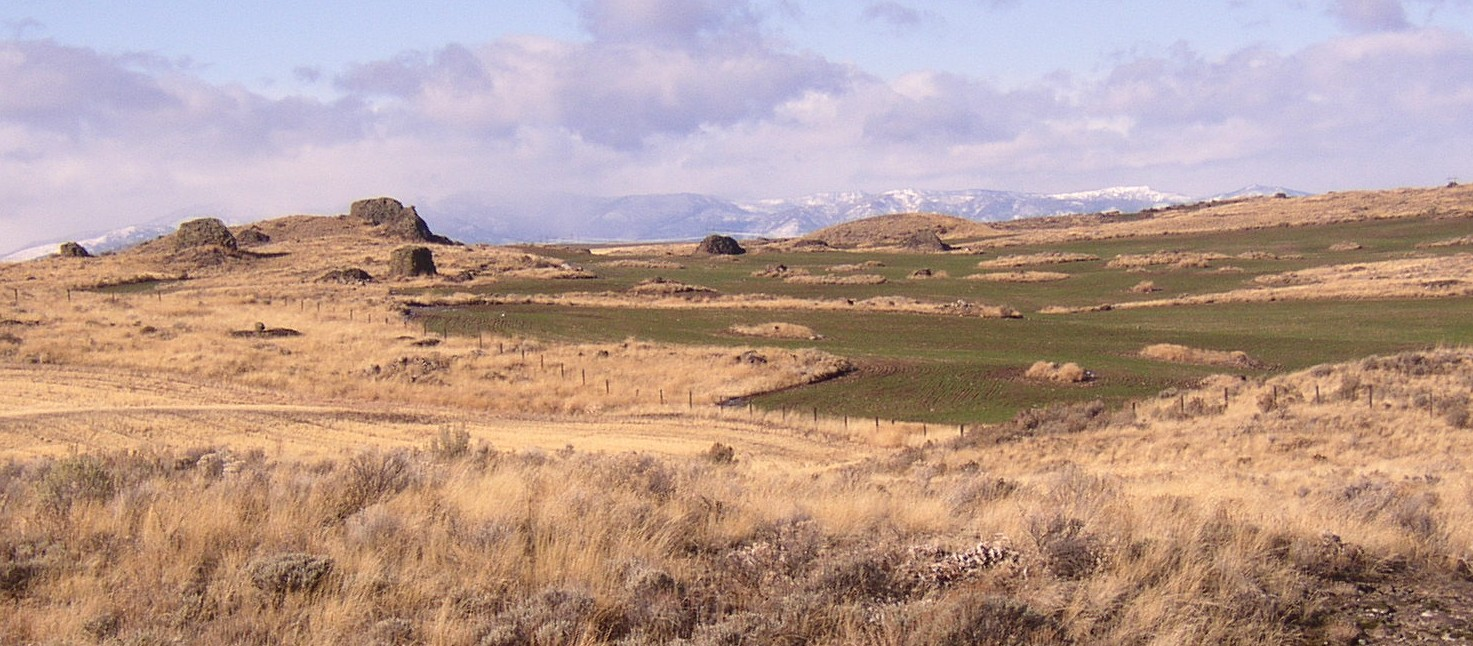
- The Withrow Moraine erratic on glacial till at the terminus of the Okanogan lobe.

- Location within Washington (state)
- Location: Douglas County, Washington state
- Coordinates: 47°41′15″N 119°37′29″W
- Designated: 1986

The Withrow Moraine and Jameson Lake Drumlin Field is a National Park Service–designated privately owned National Natural Landmark located in Douglas County, Washington state, United States. Withrow Moraine is the only Ice Age terminal moraine on the Waterville Plateau section of the Columbia Plateau. The drumlin field includes excellent examples of glacially-formed elongated hills.

== Geologic history ==
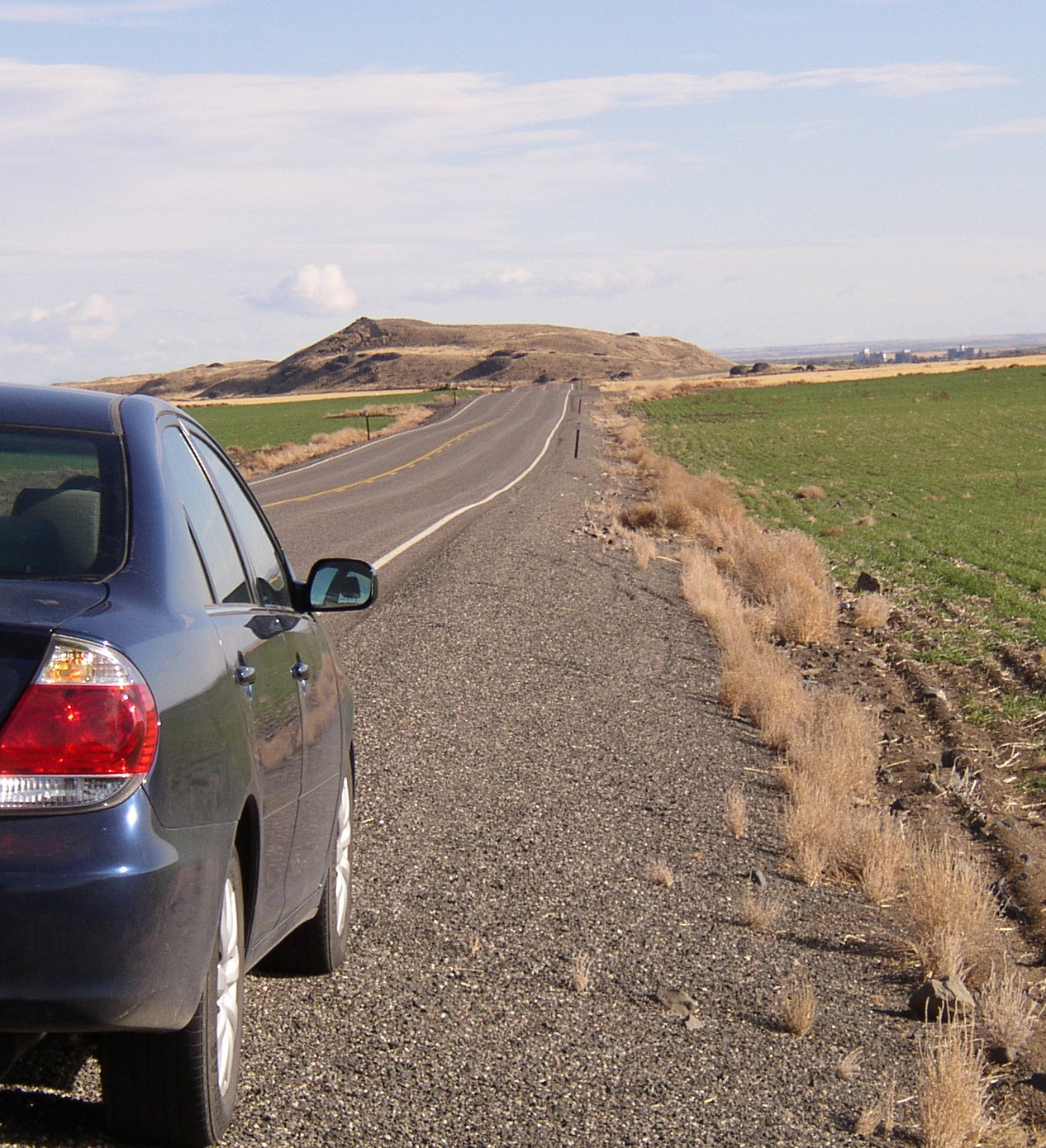
Drumlin left by Okanogan Lobe on the Waterville Plateau.

=== The plateau ===
The Withrow Moraine and Jameson Lake Drumlin Field National Natural Landmark is located on the Waterville Plateau, which lies in the northwest corner of the Columbia River Plateau. The plateau is formed on top of the Columbia River Basalt Group a large igneous province that lies across parts of the states of Washington, Oregon, and Idaho in the United States of America. During the middle to late Miocene epoch, one of the largest flood basalts ever to appear on the Earth's surface engulfed about 163,700 km^{2} (63,000 mile²) of the Pacific Northwest, forming a large igneous province with an estimated volume of 174,300 km^{3}. Eruptions were most vigorous from 17 to 14 million years ago, when over 99% of the basalt was released. Less extensive eruptions continued from 14 to 6 million years ago. These lava flows have been extensively exposed by the erosion resulting from the Missoula Floods, which laid bare many layers of the basalt flows on the edges of the plateau at Grand Coulee and Moses Coulee.

=== The glacial history ===
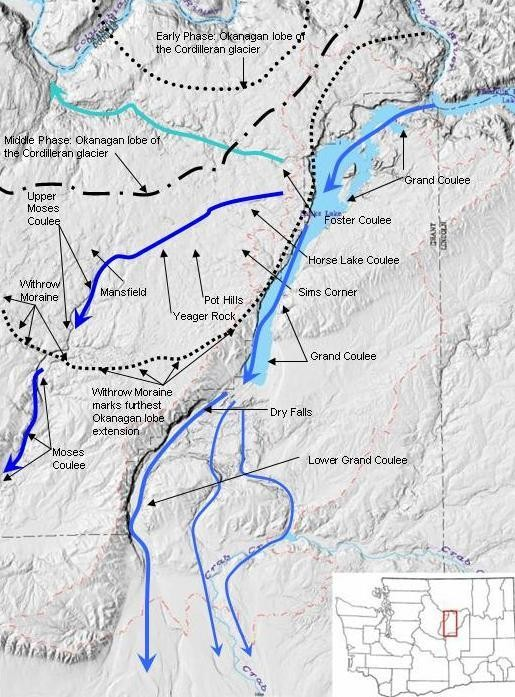
Illustration of the glacial impacts.

Two million years ago the Pleistocene epoch began and Ice age glaciers invaded the area. They scoured the Columbia River Plateau, reaching as far south as the middle of the Waterville Plateau highlands above the Grand Coulee and south to the head of Moses Coulee. In some areas north of the Grand Coulee they were as much as 3 km (10000 feet) thick. Grooves in the exposed granite bedrock are still visible in the area from the movement of glaciers and numerous glacial erratics in the elevated to the Northwest of the coulee.

=== Progress of the Okanogan Lobe of the Cordilleran Glacier ===
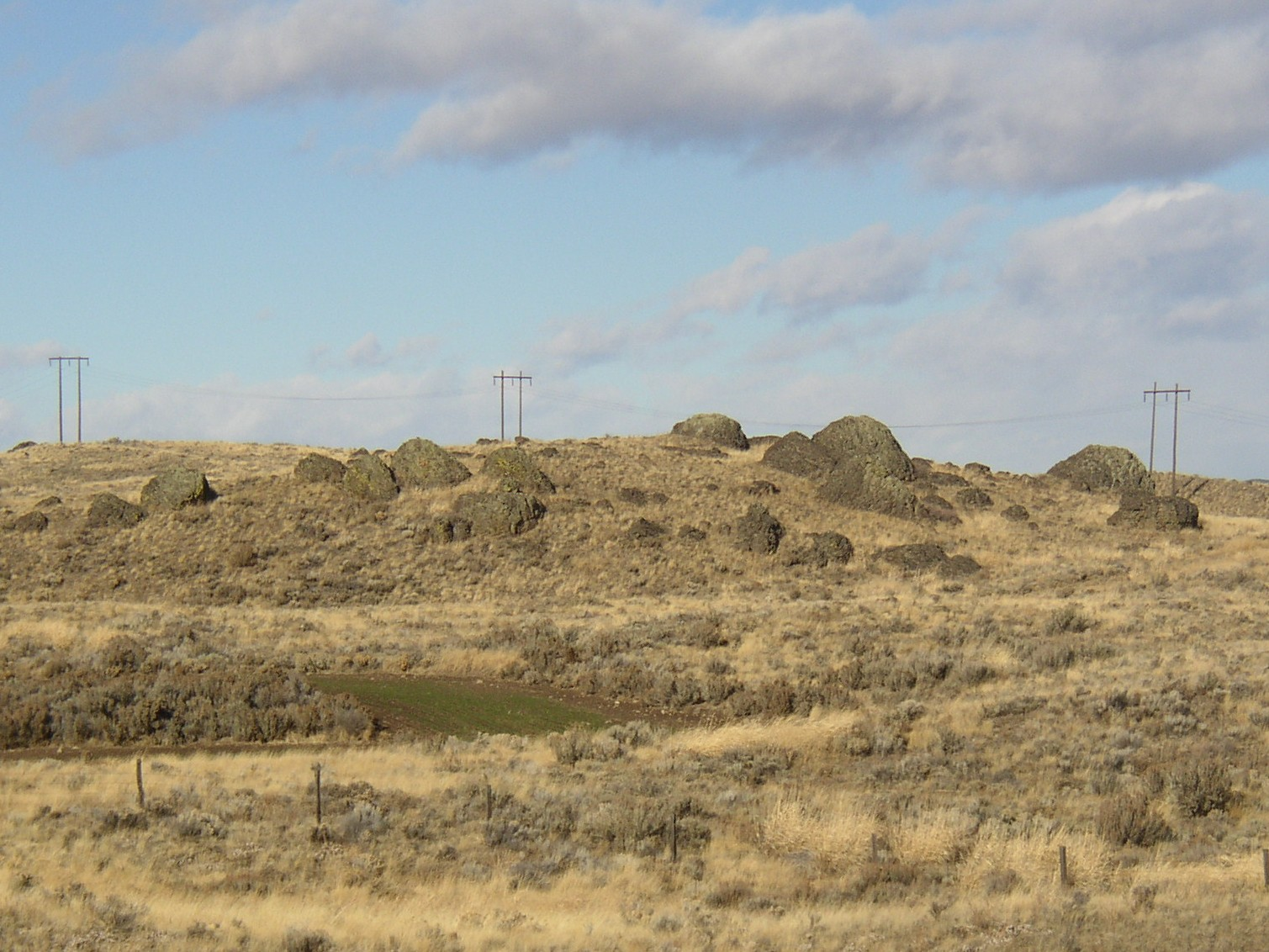
Terminal moraine with multiple kames at the terminus of the Okanogan Lobe on the Waterville Plateau.

The Okanogan lobe of the Cordilleran Ice Sheet moved down the Okanogan River valley, covering 500 mi^{2} of the Waterville Plateau and blocked the ancient route of the Columbia River, backing up water to create Glacial Lake Columbia. Initially water discharged from Lake Columbia by running up through the head of Grand Coulee and down through Foster Coulee to rejoin the Columbia River. As the glacier moved further south, Foster Coulee was cut off and the Columbia River then discharged through Moses Coulee, which runs southward slightly to the east of the ancient and current course of the Columbia. As the Okanogan lobe grew, it blocked Moses Coulee as well; the Columbia found the next lowest route through the region which was eroded to become the modern Grand Coulee.

=== After the glacier ===
As the Okanogan lobe melted, the northern half of the Waterville Plateau, including the upper portions of Moses Coulee, were littered with clear evidence of its passing. The glacier left behind a blanket of glacial till, up to 50 feet thick in places. This glacial till, composed of clay, silt, sand, gravel, cobblestones, and erratic boulders, covers most of the upper Moses Coulee. The melting glacier discharged both down Moses Coulee and into the Grand Coulee as is evident in the Sims Corner eskers and kames.

== See also ==
- List of National Natural Landmarks
- Terminal moraine
- List of glacial moraines

== Photo gallery ==
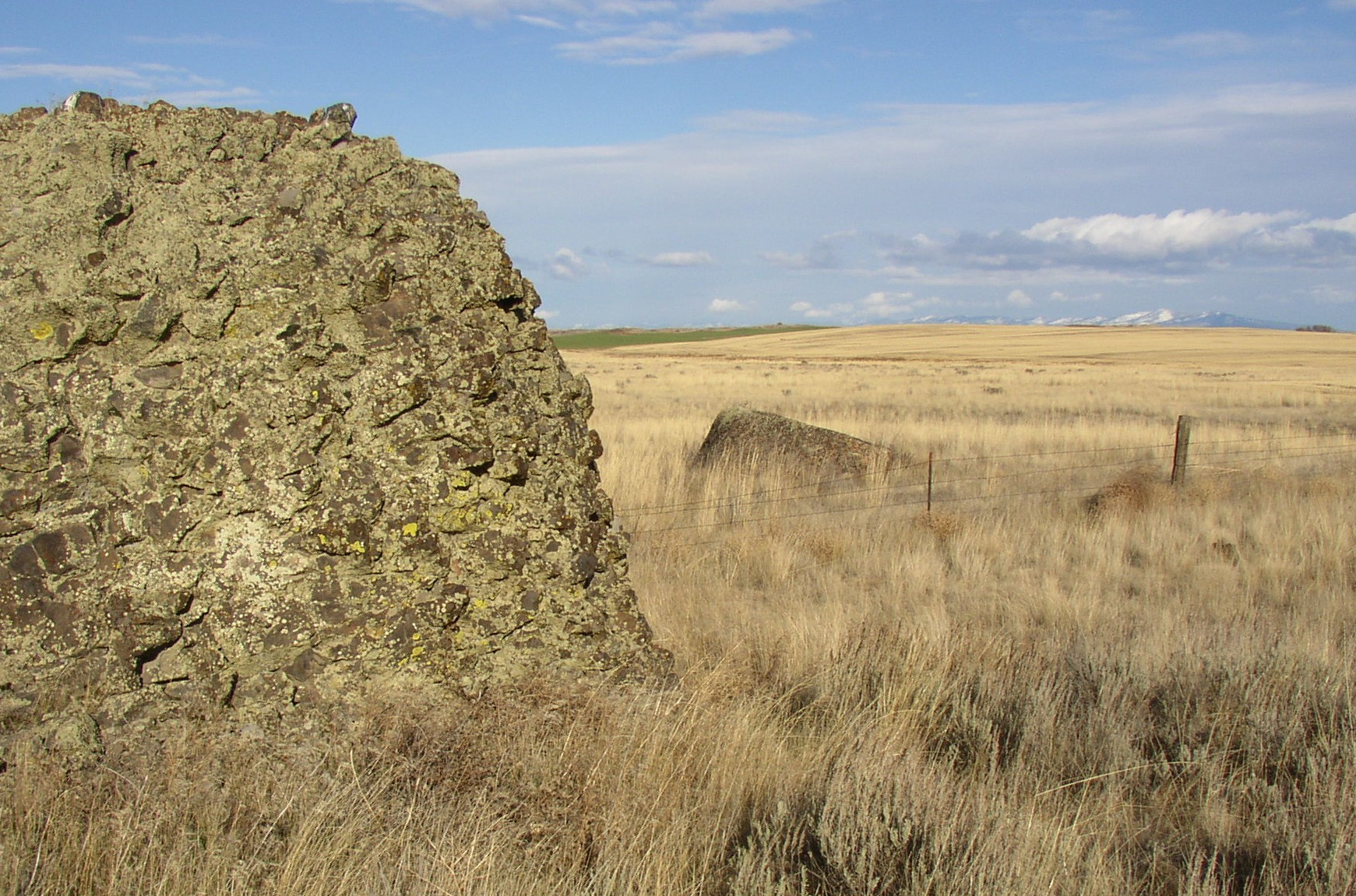
Mixed erratics located near Sims Corner. The nearest is basalt, which the ones behind it are granite.

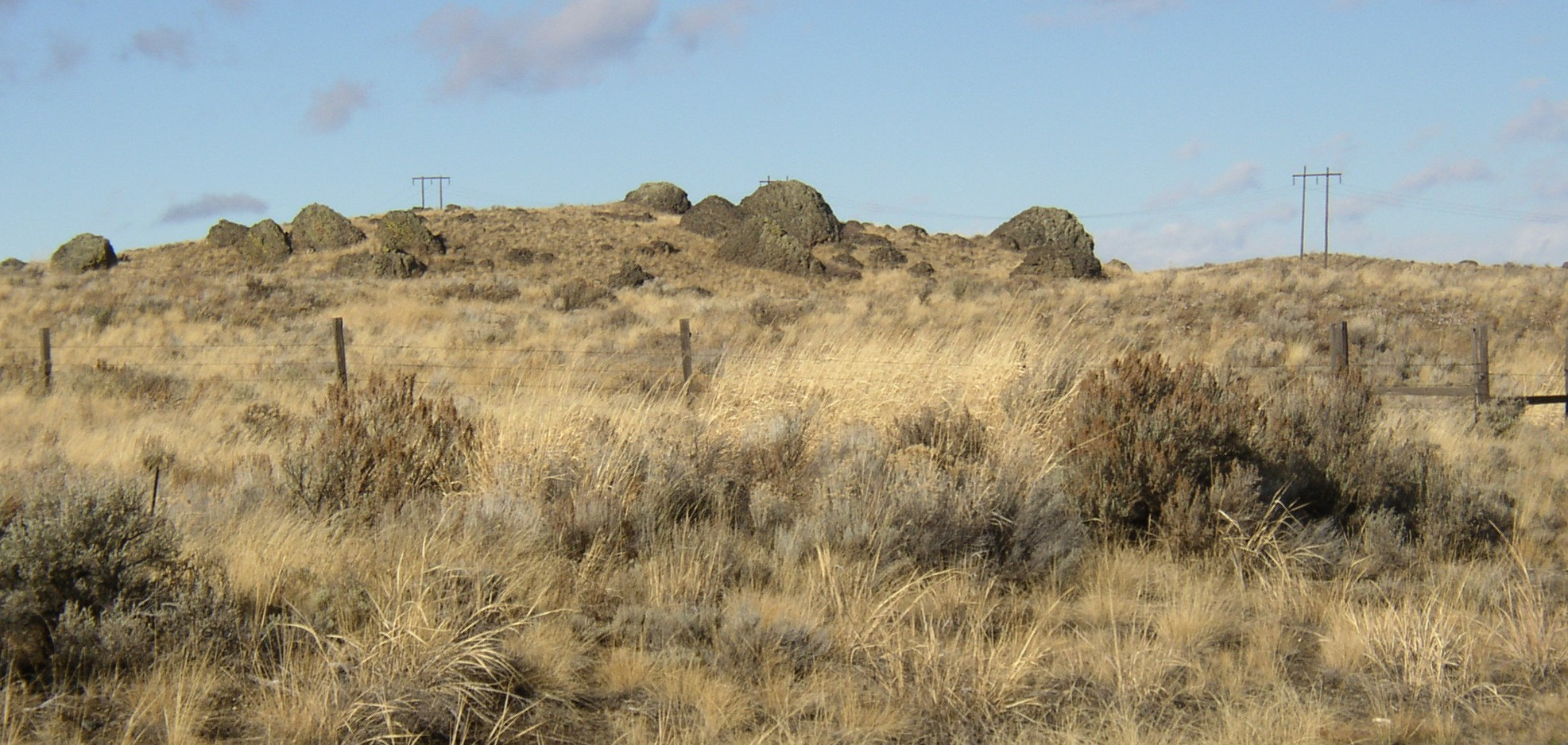
A kame among the glacial drift on the terminal moraine.

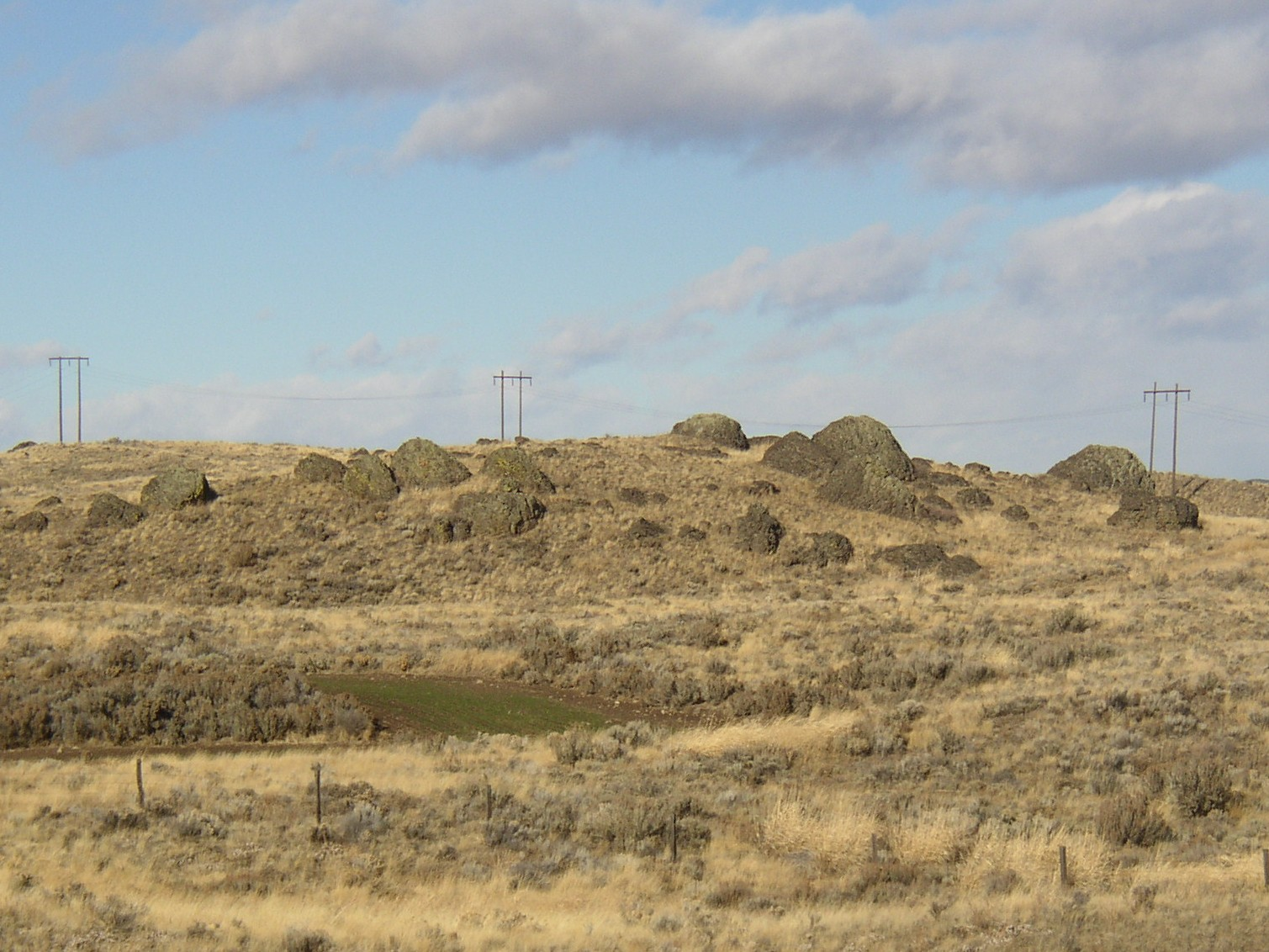
Terminal moraine of the Okanagon Lobe

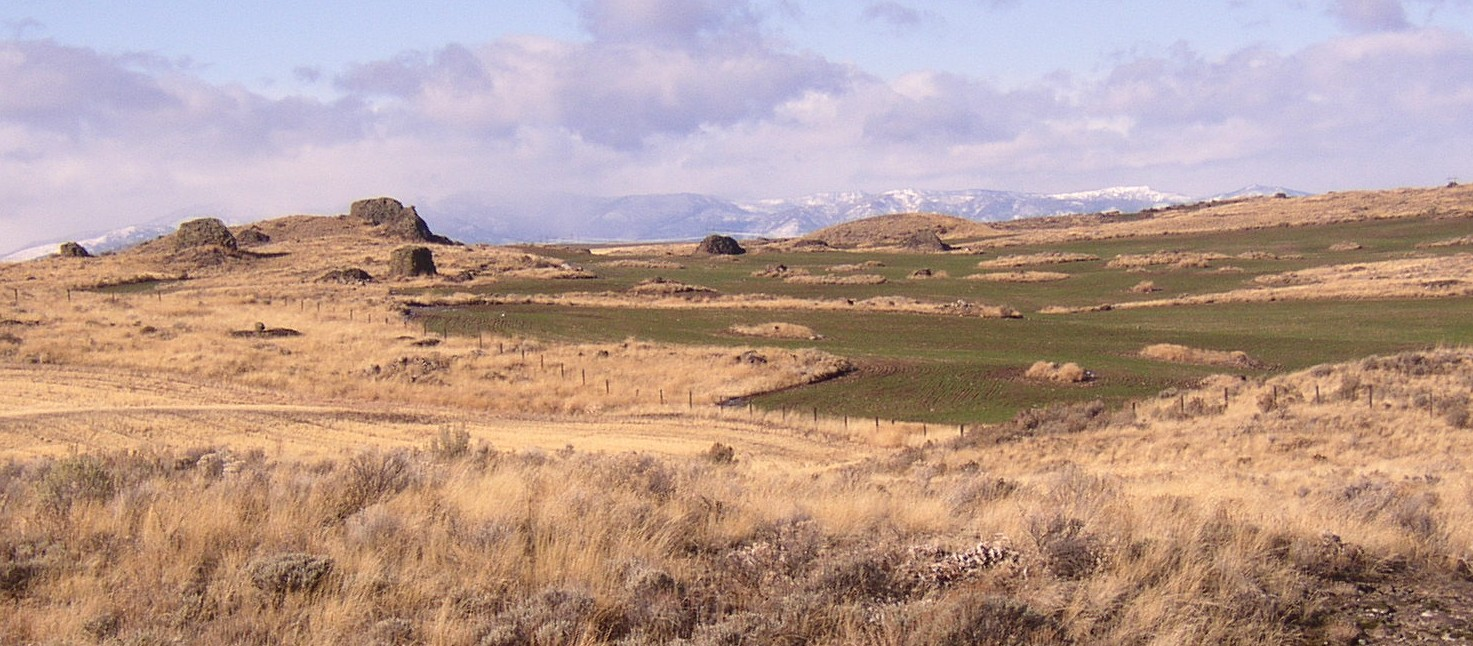
Multiple erratics on the terminal moraine of the Okanogan Lobe. Cascade mountains in the background.

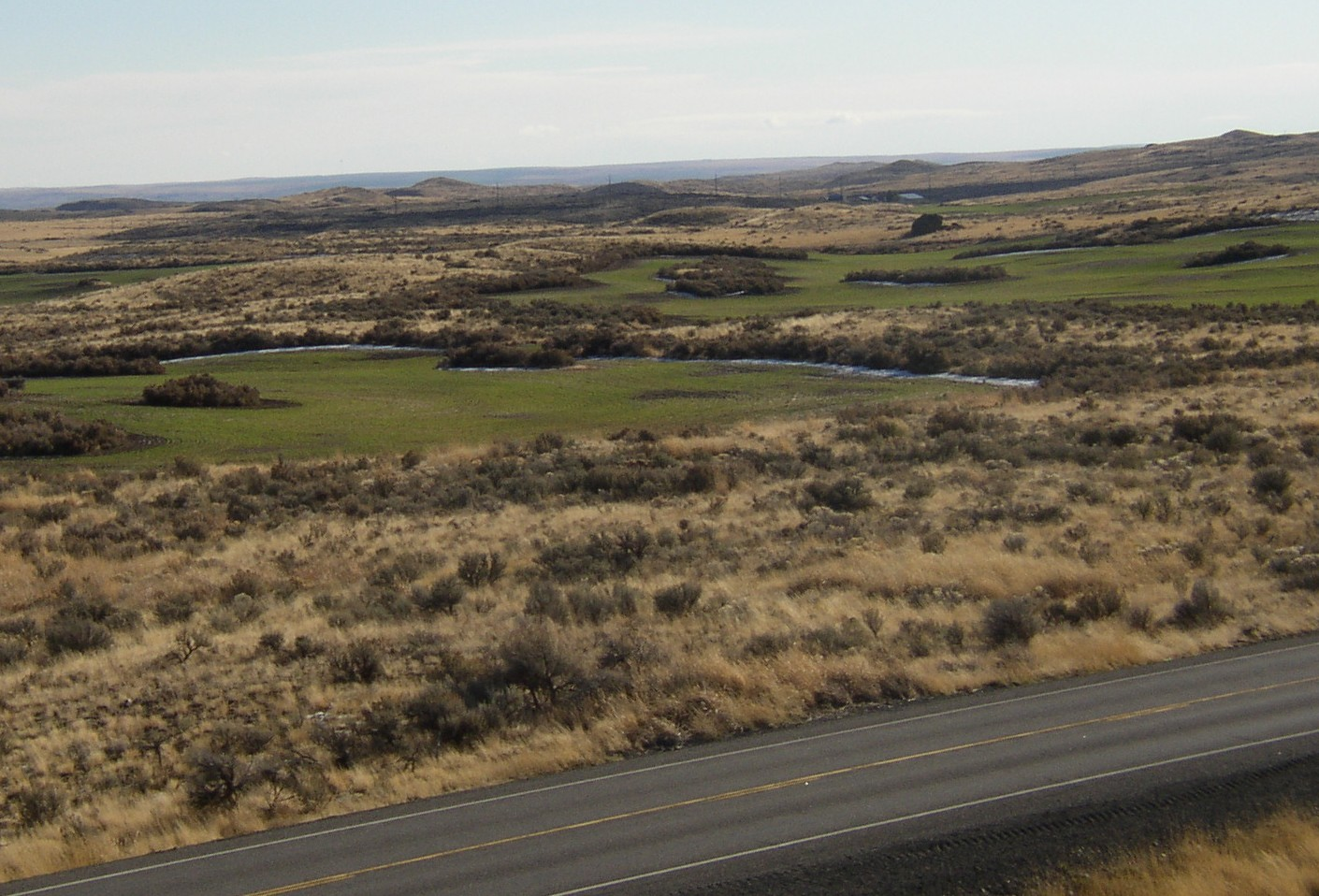
Multiple erratics on the terminal moraine of the Okanogan Lobe.
