= Moses Coulee =

Canyon in the Waterville plateau region of Douglas County, Washington

Coordinates: 47°27′30″N 119°48′00″W

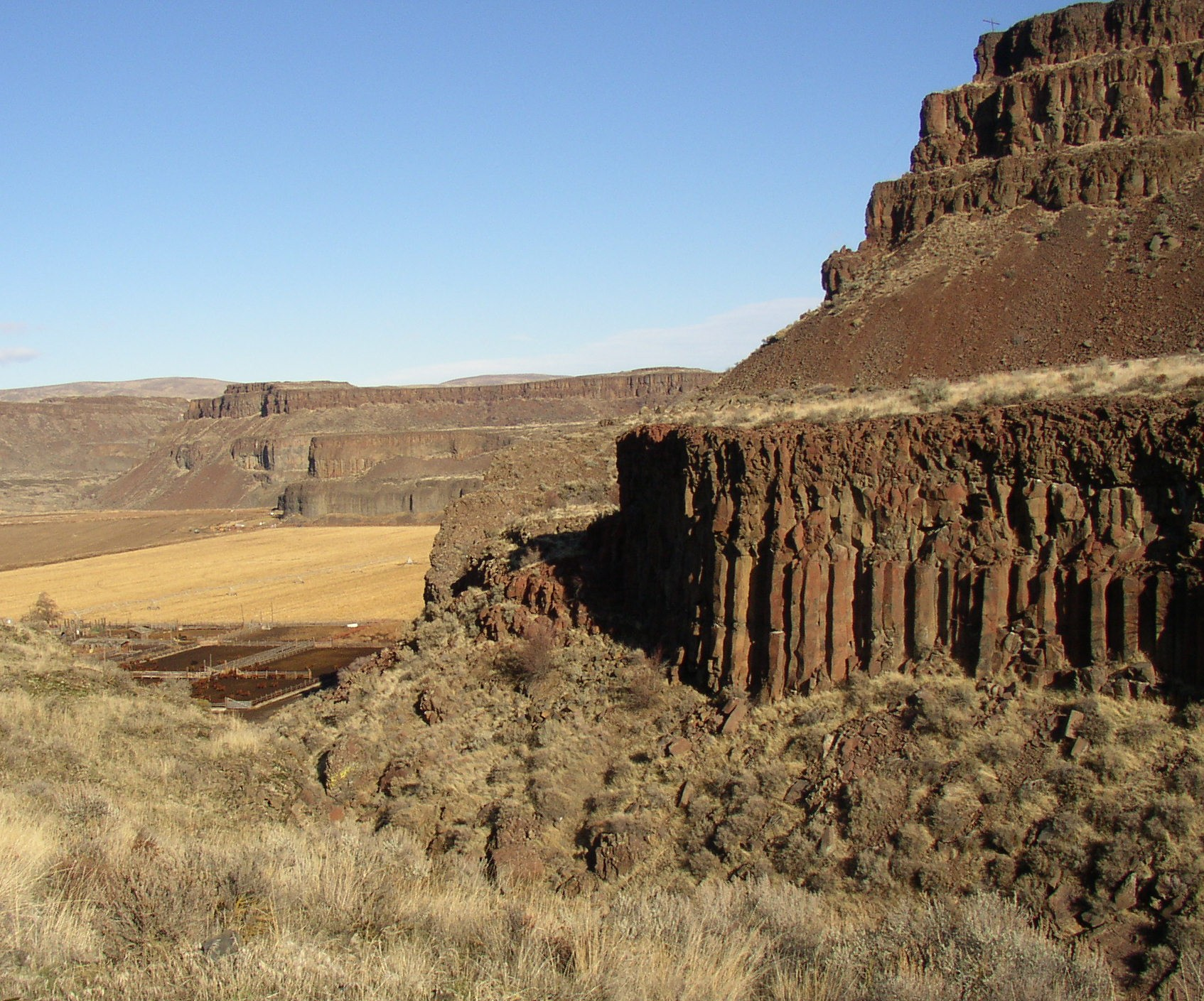
Three Devil's grade in Moses Coulee, Washington. The upper basalt is Roza Member, while the lower canyon exposes Frenchmen Springs Member basalt.

Moses Coulee is a canyon in the Waterville plateau region of Douglas County, Washington. Moses Coulee is the second-largest and westernmost canyon of the Channeled Scablands, located about 30 kilometres (19 mi) to the west of the larger Grand Coulee. This water channel is now dry, but during glacial periods, large outburst floods with discharges greater than 600,000 m^{3}/s (21,000,000 cu ft/s) carved the channel. While it's clear that glacial floodwaters passed through and contributed to the erosion of Moses Coulee, the age of those waters, thus the origins of the coulee are less clear. No clear connection between the head of the coulee and major flood routes to the north, east, or west is known. Some researchers propose that floods from glacial Lake Missoula formed Moses Coulee, while others suggest that subglacial floods from the Okanogan Lobe incised the canyon. The mouth of Moses Coulee discharges into the Columbia River.

Two National Natural Landmarks were established in 1986 for features, notable as the best examples of their kind, in and around Moses Coulee. The Great Gravel Bar of Moses Coulee, on the western edge of Moses Coulee where US Highway 2 crosses the coulee, is described as "the largest and best example of a pendant river bar formed by catastrophic glacial outburst floods that swept across the Columbia Plateau prior to the last Pleistocene glaciation." Withrow Moraine and Jameson Lake Drumlin Field "contains the best examples of drumlins and the most illustrative segment of the only Pleistocene terminal moraine in the Columbia Plateau biophysiographic province. ... They are also the only such glacial features in the world to show a clear geological relationship to catastrophic flooding." The canyon is named for Chief Moses (1829–99).

== Geologic history ==
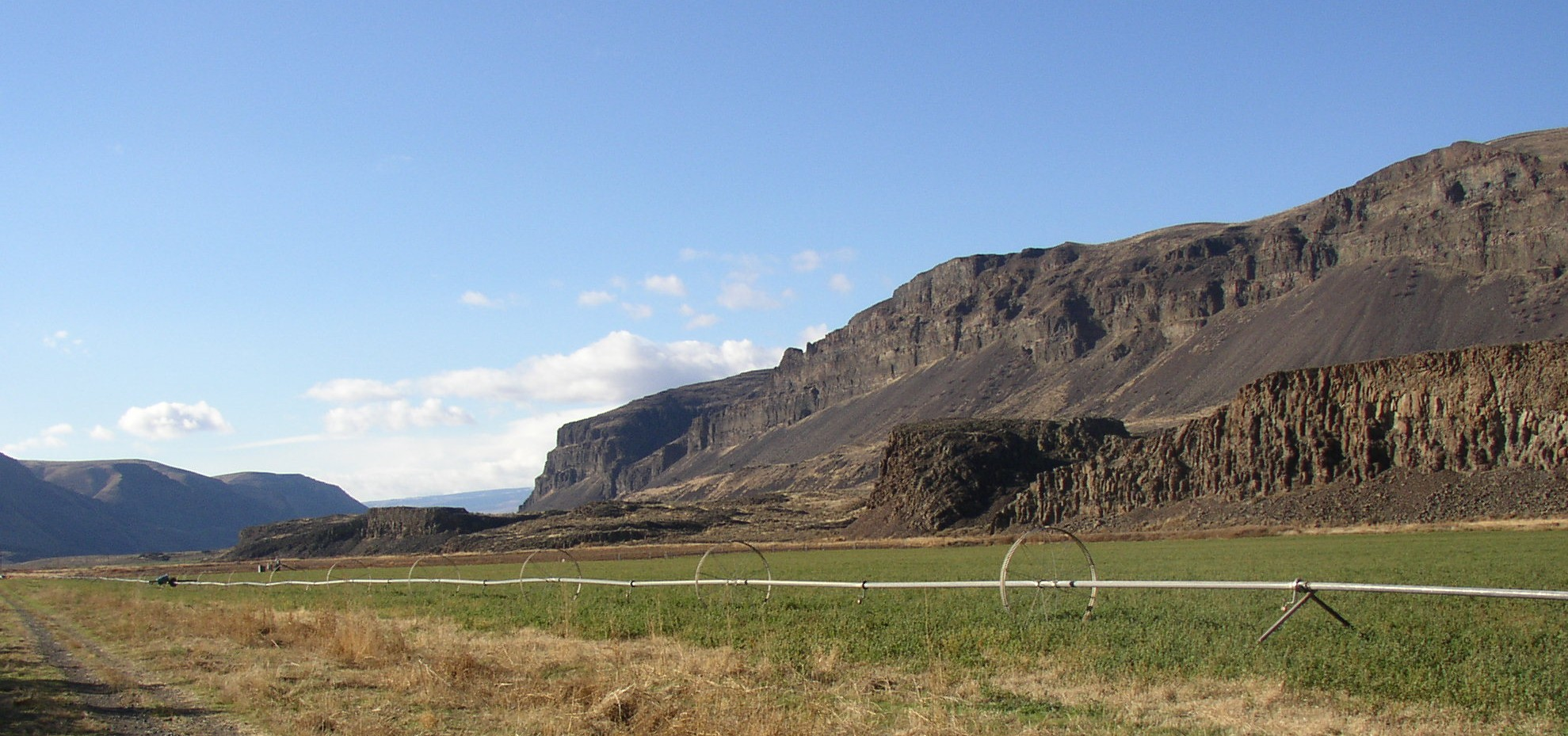
Moses Coulee at mid canyon

=== Geological setting ===
Moses Coulee cuts into the Waterville Plateau, which lies in the northwest corner of the Columbia River Plateau. The plateau is part of the Columbia River Basalt Group, a large igneous province that lies across parts of the states of Washington, Oregon, and Idaho in the United States of America. During late Miocene and early Pliocene times, one of the larger flood basalts ever to appear on the earth's surface engulfed about 163,700 km^{2} (63,000 mile^{2}) of the Pacific Northwest, forming a large igneous province with an estimated volume of 174,300 km^{3}. Eruptions were most vigorous from 17—14 million years ago, when over 99% of the basalt was released. Less extensive eruptions continued from 14—6 million years ago. These lava flows have been extensively exposed by the erosion resulting from the Missoula Floods, which laid bare many layers of the basalt flows on the edges of the plateau along the course of Moses Coulee.

=== Glacial history ===
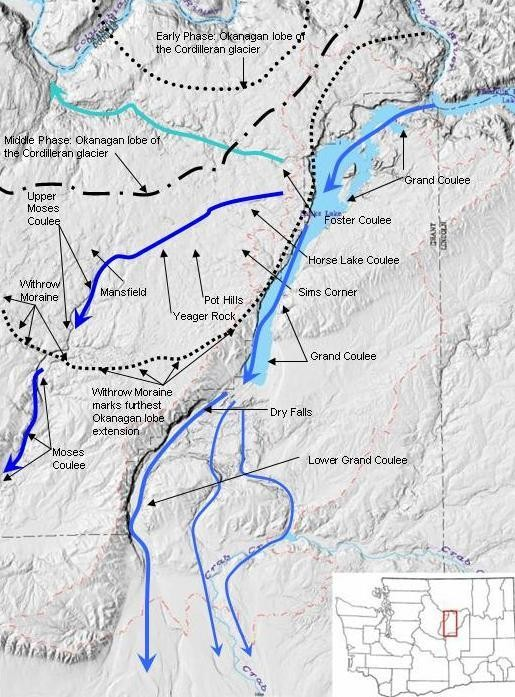
Illustration of the glacial impacts showing the events leading to formation of Moses Coulee.

Pleistocene glaciers advanced onto the Waterville Plateau, with the Okanogan Lobe of the Cordilleran Ice Sheet reaching as far south as the town of Withrow. Evidence for glaciation on the Waterville Plateau includes polished and striated bedrock, glacial erratics, drumlinoid topography, eskers, moraines, meltwater channels, and glacial till. The Withrow Moraine complex marks the maximum southern extent of the Okanogan Lobe, and a series of recessional moraine complexes represent retreating ice margins. Ice damming of the Columbia River formed Glacial Lake Columbia and Lake Spokane, larger lakes than Lake Roosevelt, which is currently backed up in the same location behind the Grand Coulee Dam.

=== Creation of Moses Coulee ===
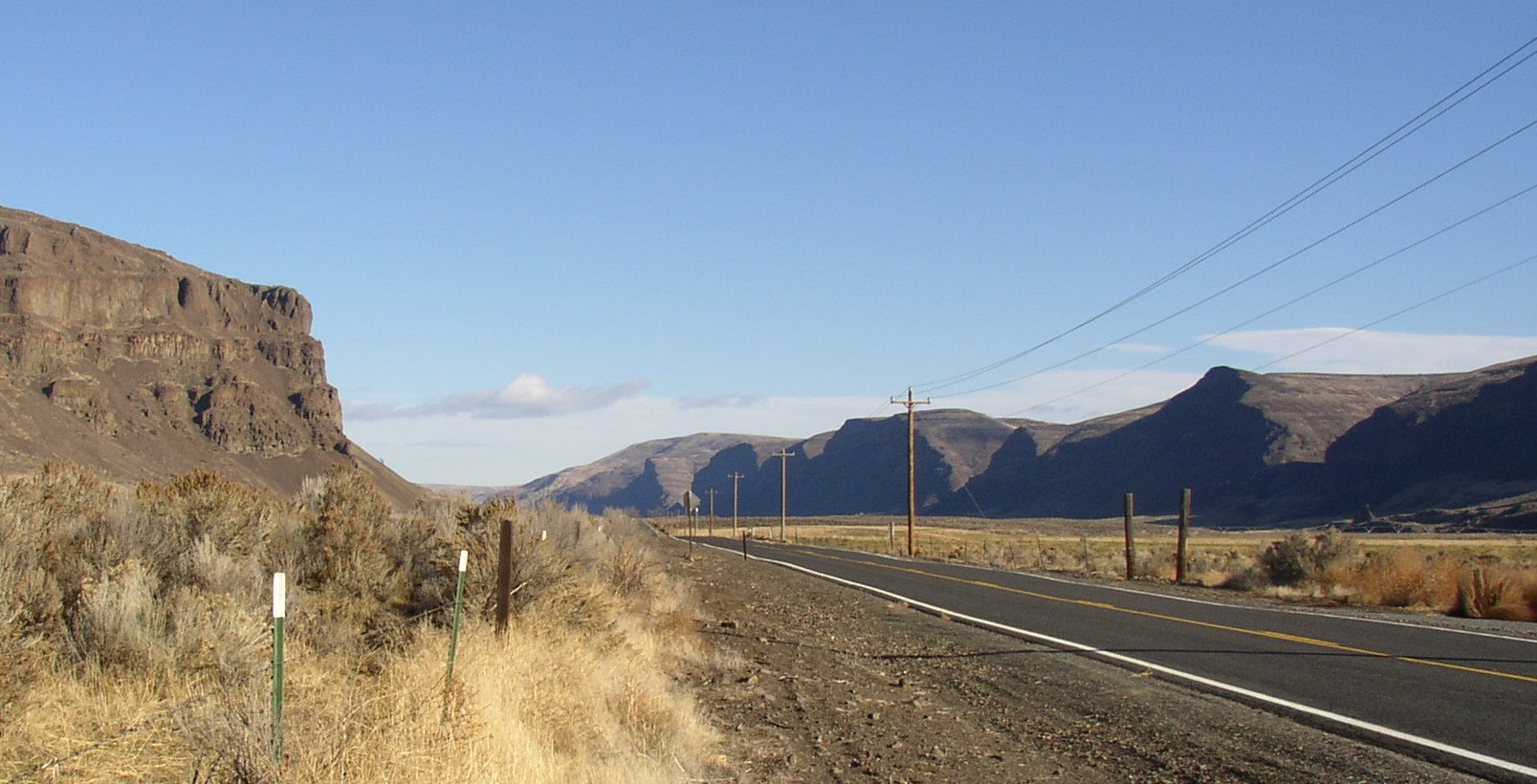
Lower Moses Coulee looking up canyon on the Waterville Plateau. Drainages of the plateau which existed prior to the glacial floods cut the truncated streambeds on the sides of the coulee.

A precursor to glacial-flood-cut Moses Coulee existed prior to the glacial floods as a drainage basin with a number of side streams, draining the southern portion of the plateau. These streams had combined into a canyon that drained to the Columbia near the current mouth of Moses Coulee. These side drainages are still visible today along the coulee walls as truncated streambeds, interspersed with gable-like highlands.

The Okanogan lobe of the Cordilleran Glacier moved down the Okanogan River valley, covering 500 mi^{2} of the Waterville Plateau and blocked the ancient route of the Columbia River, backing up water to create Glacial Lake Columbia and Lake Spokane. Initially water discharged from Lake Columbia by running up through the head of Grand Coulee and down through Foster Coulee to rejoin the Columbia River. As the glacier moved further south, Foster Coulee was cut off and the Columbia River then discharged through Moses Coulee, which runs southward slightly to the east of the ancient and current course of the Columbia. As the Okanogan lobe grew, it blocked Moses Coulee as well; the Columbia found the next lowest route through the region which was eroded to become the modern Grand Coulee. Flowing across the current Grand Coulee and Dry Falls regions, the ice age Columbia then entered the Quincy Basin and joined Crab Creek, following Crab Creek's course southward past the Frenchman Hills and turning west to run along the north face of the Saddle Mountains and rejoin the previous and modern course of the Columbia River just above the main water gap in the Saddle Mountains, Sentinel Gap.

Although the Columbia River flowed only for a short period through Moses Coulee, this period included one or more of the tremendous flows from the Missoula Floods.

=== After the glacier ===
As the Okanogan lobe melted, the upper portions of Moses Coulee were littered with clear evidence of its passing in the Withrow Moraine. The glacier left behind a blanket of glacial till, up to 50 feet (15 m) thick in places. This glacial till, made up of clay, silt, sand, gravel, cobblestones, and erratic boulders, covers most of the upper coulee.

Today Moses Coulee supports an excellent example of a shrub-steppe ecoregion. Vegetation includes sagebrush, rabbitbrush, greasewood, hopsage, bitterbrush, bunchgrass, buckwheat and other vegetation once common to most of the Columbia Plateau, however it is vulnerable to the same forces that are destroying shrub-steppe and big sagebrush throughout the western US such as development, wildfires, invasion by non-native annual species, and overgrazing.

During the 2020 Washington Labor Day fires more than 400,000 acres of shrub-steppe was burned including 3,000 acres of Moses Coulee Preserve in just half a day.

== Moses Coulee Preserve ==
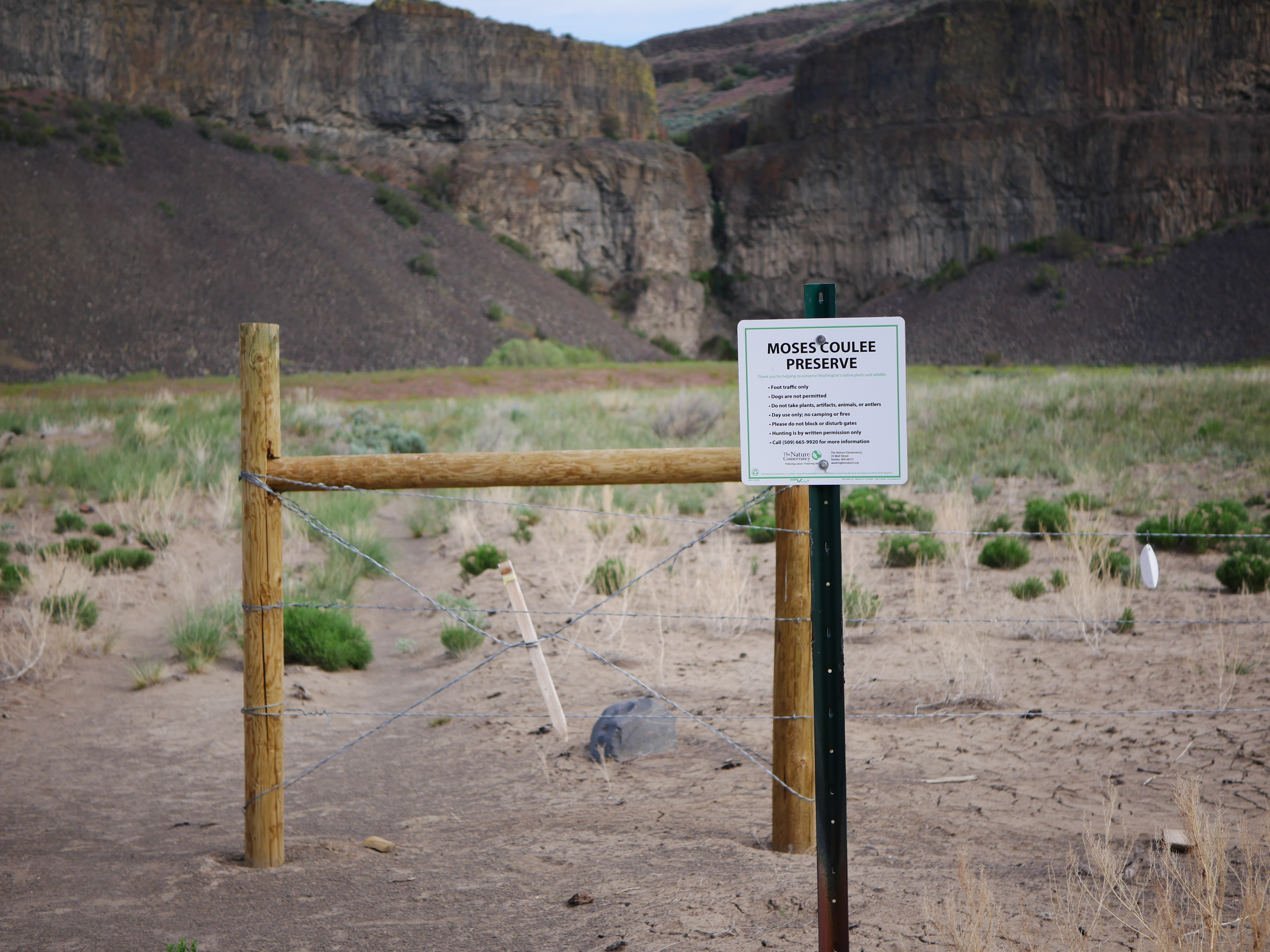
Moses Coulee Preserve Trailhead

The Nature Conservancy has established the Moses Coulee Preserve, which is a 3,588-acre (14.52 km^{2}) contiguous, intact shrub-steppe habitat. It is located 2 miles (3.2 km) south of Jameson Lake near the head of Moses Coulee. It provide habitat for a rich variety of birds (lazuli bunting, common goldeneye, sage thrasher, sage sparrow, poorwill, mountain bluebird, loggerhead shrike, canyon wren, white-throated swift, golden eagle), plants (sagebrush buttercup, shooting star, sulphur lupine, serviceberry, mock orange, slender cryptantha, Tiehm's rush, big sagebrush, bluebunch wheatgrass and sego lily) and animals (mule deer, least chipmunk, bats, and marmot).
