= Marine View, Washington =

- Census-designated place
- Location within Washington (state) Location within the United States
- Coordinates: 46°57′49″N 119°21′03″W
- Country: United States
- State: Washington
- County: Grant

Area
  - Total: 0.90 sq mi (2.32 km^{2})
  - Land: 0.90 sq mi (2.32 km^{2})
  - Water: 0 sq mi (0.0 km^{2})
- Elevation: 1,155 ft (352 m)

Population (2020)
  - Total: 405
- Time zone: UTC-8 (Pacific (PST))
  - Summer (DST): UTC-7 (PDT)
- ZIP Code: 99344 (Othello)
- Area code: 509
- FIPS code: 53-43552
- GNIS feature ID: 2807181

Marine View is an unincorporated community and census-designated place (CDP) in Grant County, Washington, United States. As of the 2020 census, it had a population of 405.

The CDP is in the southeast part of the county, at the northern base of the Frenchman Hills, on the south side of Washington State Route 262. Potholes Reservoir and Potholes State Park are to the north across the state highway. Othello is 24 miles (39 km) east and south by state highway, and Moses Lake is 18 miles (29 km) east and north.

== Education ==
The area is served by the Royal School District.

== Demographics ==
Historical population
| Census | Pop. | Note | %± |
|---|---|---|---|
| 2020 | 405 | | — |
U.S. Decennial Census

Marine View first appeared as a census designated place in the 2020 U.S. census.

=== Racial and ethnic composition ===
Marine View CDP, Washington – Racial and ethnic composition Note: the US Census treats Hispanic/Latino as an ethnic category. This table excludes Latinos from the racial categories and assigns them to a separate category. Hispanics/Latinos may be of any race.
| Race / Ethnicity (NH = Non-Hispanic) | Pop 2020 | 2020 |
|---|---|---|
| White alone (NH) | 327 | 80.74% |
| Black or African American alone (NH) | 0 | 0.00% |
| Native American or Alaska Native alone (NH) | 6 | 1.48% |
| Asian alone (NH) | 1 | 0.25% |
| Native Hawaiian or Pacific Islander alone (NH) | 0 | 0.00% |
| Other race alone (NH) | 0 | 0.00% |
| Mixed race or Multiracial (NH) | 7 | 1.73% |
| Hispanic or Latino (any race) | 64 | 15.80% |
| Total | 405 | 100.00% |
