= Columbia Basin Wildlife Area =

Wildlife sanctuary in Washington, US

The Columbia Basin Wildlife Area is a wildlife sanctuary managed by Washington Department of Fish and Wildlife, stretching across 160,100 acres (64,800 ha) in Adams County and Grant County in the U.S. state of Washington.

The area is administered as 13 physically distinct management units:

- Banks Lake Unit: at Banks Lake
- Billy Clapp Lake Unit: at Billy Clapp Lake
- Desert Unit: 70,000 acres, including Potholes Reservoir (formerly Potholes Reservoir Unit) and sand dunes
- Gloyd Seeps Unit: in Upper Crab Creek flood channels
- Lower Crab Creek Unit: at Lower Crab Creek
- Priest Rapids Unit: east bank of the Columbia River near Mattawa
- Quincy Lakes Unit: including Frenchman Coulee
- Rocky Ford Creek Unit: at Rocky Ford Creek, which supplies Moses Lake
- Seep Lakes Unit: within Drumheller Channels National Natural Landmark
- Sprague Lake Unit: at Sprague Lake
- Sun Lakes Unit: under Dry Falls
- Upland Restoration Unit
- Winchester Reservoir Unit: at Winchester Wasteway, between George and Moses Lake
