= Washington State Route 262 =

State highway in Washington, United States

State Route 262

- SR 262 highlighted in red

Route information
- Auxiliary route of SR 26
- Maintained by WSDOT
- Length: 24.22 mi (38.98 km)
- Existed: 1991–present

Major junctions
- West end: SR 26 near Othello
- East end: SR 17 near Warden

Location
- Country: United States
- State: Washington
- Counties: Grant

Highway system
- State highways in Washington; Interstate; US; State; Scenic; Pre-1964; 1964 renumbering; Former
← SR 261	→ SR 263

State Route 262 (SR 262) is a state highway in the U.S. state of Washington, serving rural Grant County. The highway travels north from SR 26 between Royal City and Othello through farmland and east through the Columbia National Wildlife Refuge and on top of the O'Sullivan Dam over the Potholes Reservoir before ending at SR 17 northwest of Warden. A roadway to the Potholes Reservoir has appeared on maps since 1922 and a fully paved road on the current route was built by 1981. SR 262 was designated in 1991 primarily to serve Potholes State Park.

== Route description ==
State Route 262 (SR 262) begins at an intersection with SR 26 between Royal City and Othello, north of the west area of the Columbia National Wildlife Refuge in rural Grant County. Passing north through farmland in the Frenchman Hills, the highway turns east into O'Sullivan and passes Potholes State Park. The roadway continues east and forms the boundary of the Potholes Reservoir, the O'Sullivan Dam, and the northern boundary of the Columbia National Wildlife Refuge. SR 262 travels east, passing Soda Lake and Warden Lake, before travelling through the Lind Coulee and ending at an intersection with SR 17 northwest of Warden.

Every year, the Washington State Department of Transportation (WSDOT) conducts a series of surveys on its highways in the state to measure traffic volume. This is expressed in terms of annual average daily traffic (AADT), which is a measure of traffic volume for any average day of the year. In 2011, WSDOT calculated that between 480 and 1,200 vehicles per day used the highway.

== History ==
A basic, unpaved road was built during the early 20th century in Lind Coulee on the current route of State Route 262 (SR 262), appearing on a 1922 United States Geological Survey map of the Othello area. After the establishment of the Columbia National Wildlife Refuge in 1944 and the completion of the O'Sullivan Dam and the Potholes Reservoir in 1949, the road was paved and connected to SR 17 after the 1964 highway renumbering. By the 1980s, a permanent road was built from SR 26 over the Frenchman Hills to the O'Sullivan Dam and onto SR 17. The highway was designated as SR 262 by the state legislature in 1991 and was formally incorporated into the state highway system on April 1, 1992.

== Major intersections ==
The entire highway is in Grant County.

Location	mi	km	Destinations	Notes
	0.00	0.00	SR 26 – Royal City, Vantage	
	24.22	38.98	SR 17 – Moses Lake, Othello	
1.000 mi = 1.609 km; 1.000 km = 0.621 mi
