= Corfu Slide =

Geological feature in Washington, U.S.

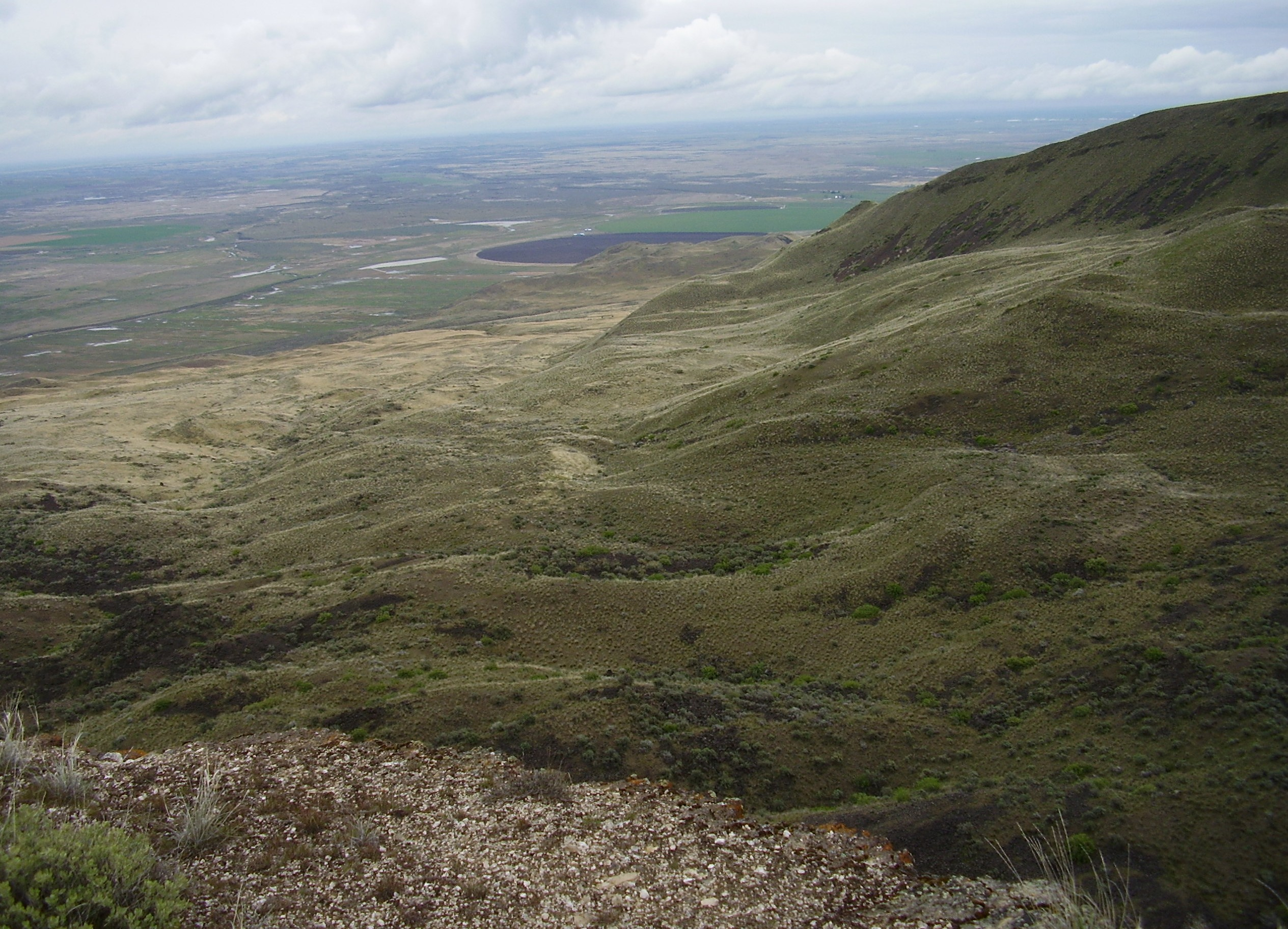
The Corfu Slide as seen from above on the crest of the Saddle Mountains looking easterly.

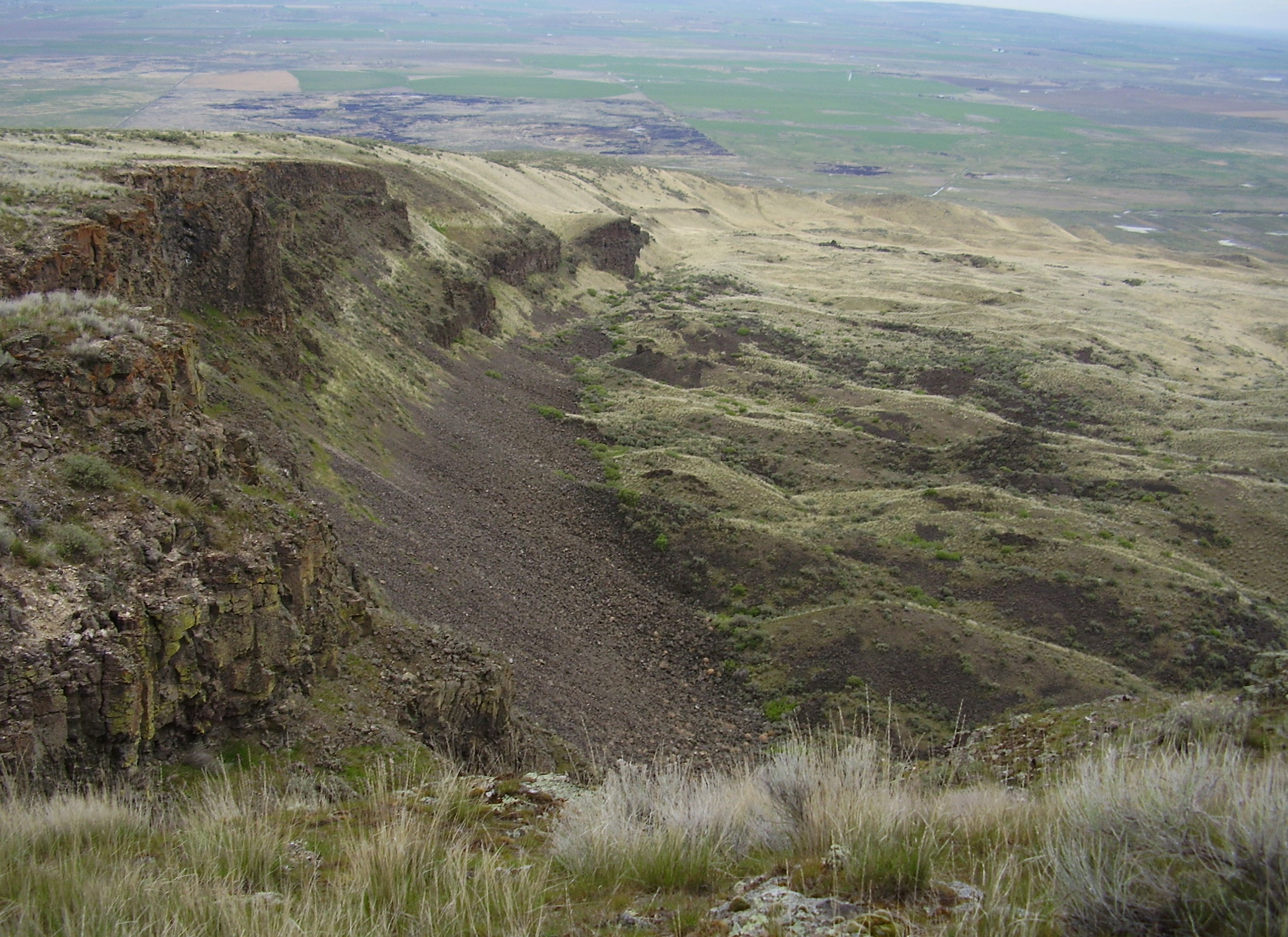
The Corfu Slide as seen from above on the crest of the Saddle Mountains looking north along the western edge.

The Corfu Slide is a geological feature located on the north slope of the Saddle Mountains above Crab Creek near the Columbia River in eastern Washington. It consists of 24 separate slides that cover approximately 18-20 square kilometers (7 to 8 miles²) and contains a volume of material of about 1 cubic kilometer.

== Geologic History ==
Geologic evidence supports the view that the slide occurred 13,000 to 15,000 years ago as the result of undercutting which occurred during the Missoula Floods associated with the retreat of glaciers during the last ice age. Water flowing through the Channeled Scablands split into two streams just upstream of the Corfu Slide, with part flowing to the east to pass over the low end of the Saddle Mountains and part flowing westward to pass through Sentinel Gap in the Saddle Mountains. The force of the water diverted to the west impinged on the base of the Corfu Slide area, causing erosion. At least some of the slide occurred before the final Missoula Floods as the older landslide debris has been eroded and smoothed by water flow.

== Location ==
The best viewpoint for the landslide is from its top on the crest of the Saddle Mountains. However it is visible from a number of points, including a road which traverses the lower portions of the slide.

Location	Coordinates
Easterly portion of Saddle Mountains where Lower Crab Creek meets the mountains at the Corfu Slide. The slide runs toward the west from this point.	46°49′00″N 119°22′30″W
Western boundary of Corfu Slide.	46°48′00″N 119°26′40″W
