= Crab Creek =

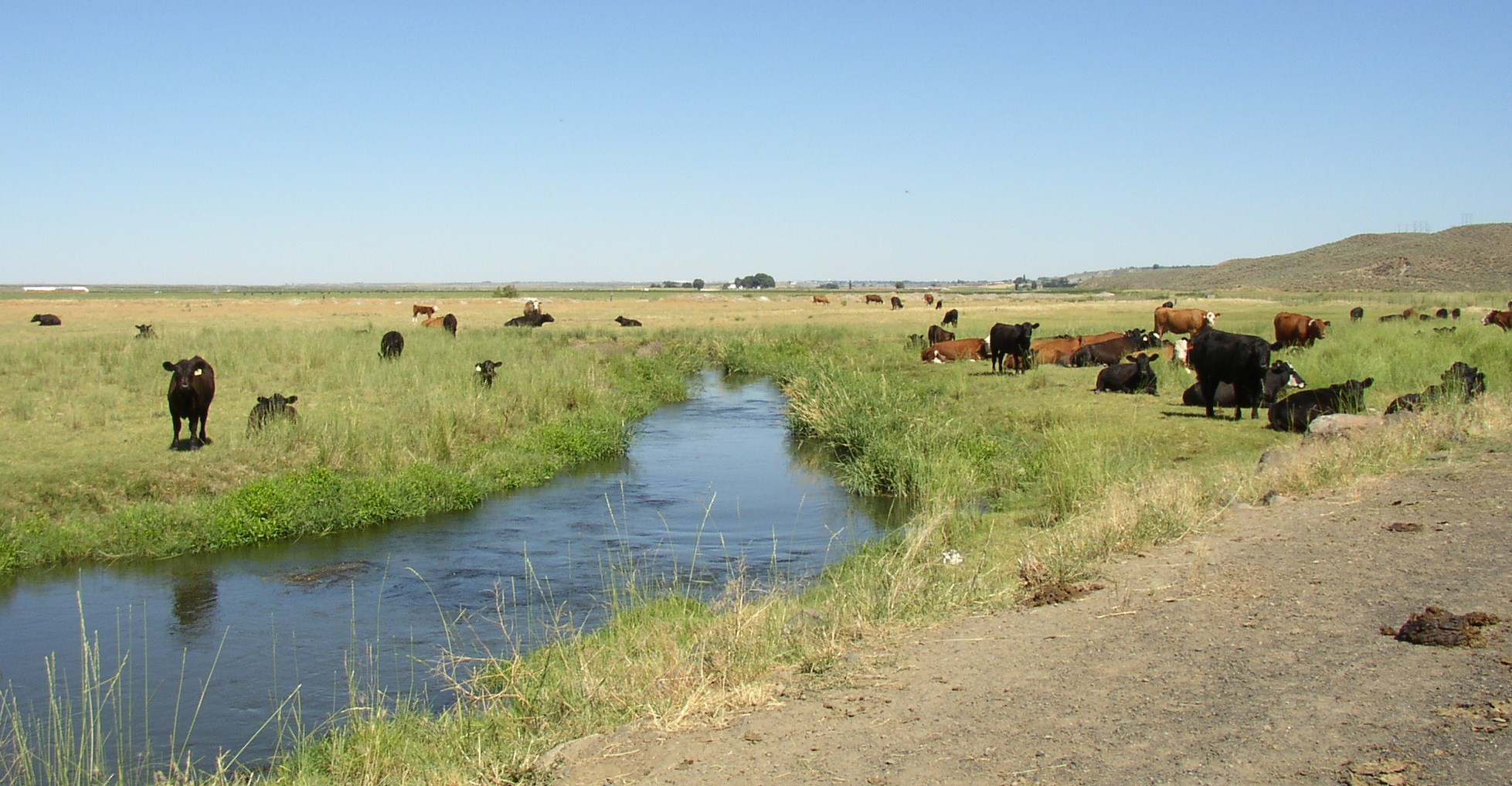
- Lower Crab Creek above confluence with Red Rock Coulee.

- Mouth of Crab Creek in Washington

Location
- Country: United States
- State: Washington
- County: Grant County, Adams County, Lincoln County
- City: Moses Lake

Physical characteristics
- Source: Near Gettys Butte
  - location: Lincoln County
  - coordinates: 47°42′42″N 117°54′24″W
  - elevation: 2,730 ft (830 m)
- Mouth: Columbia River
  - location: Grant County
  - coordinates: 46°48′55″N 119°55′19″W
  - elevation: 489 ft (149 m)
- Length: 163 mi (262 km)
- Basin size: 5,097 sq mi (13,200 km^{2})
- Discharge
  - average: 201 cu ft/s (5.7 m^{3}/s)
  - minimum: 10 cu ft/s (0.28 m^{3}/s)
  - maximum: 936 cu ft/s (26.5 m^{3}/s)

Basin features
- Tributaries
  - left: Rocky Ford Creek
  - right: Coal Creek, Canniwai Creek, Wilson Creek, Red Rock Coulee

Crab Creek is a stream in the U.S. state of Washington. Named for the presence of crayfish, it is one of the few perennial streams in the Columbia Basin of central Washington, flowing from the northeastern Columbia River Plateau, roughly 5 km (3.1 mi) east of Reardan, west-southwest to empty into the Columbia River near the small town of Beverly. Its course exhibits many examples of the erosive powers of extremely large glacial Missoula Floods of the late Pleistocene, which scoured the region. In addition, Crab Creek and its region have been transformed by the large-scale irrigation of the Bureau of Reclamation's Columbia Basin Project (CBP), which has raised water table levels, significantly extending the length of Crab Creek and created new lakes and streams.

Crab Creek is 163 miles (262 km) long and drains a watershed in eastern Washington of 5,097 square miles (13,200 km^{2}). It is sometimes referred to as the "longest ephemeral stream in North America".

== Course ==
Crab Creek is sometimes separated into Upper Crab Creek, which runs from the creek's source to Potholes Reservoir, and Lower Crab Creek, which runs from Potholes Reservoir to the Columbia River. Sometimes the stream is divided into three parts—Upper Crab Creek, from its source to Brook Lake, Middle Crab Creek, from Brook Lake to and including Potholes Reservoir; and Lower Crab Creek, from below Potholes Reservoir to the Columbia River.

Upper Crab Creek was dry before the CBP and remains intermittent today. From its source near Reardan it flows generally southwest then west, collecting tributaries including Rock Creek, Coal Creek, Duck Creek, Canniwai Creek, and Wilson Creek. It empties into Brook Lake, located just south of Billy Clapp Lake, an equalizing reservoir of the CBP created by Pinto Dam.

Crab Creek turns southward after Brook Lake. The CBP's East Low Canal, one of the projects main irrigation canals, crosses but does not mix waters with Crab Creek. At the city of Moses Lake Crab Creek empties into the Parker Horn arm of Moses Lake. Just before reaching the lake Crab Creek receives the waters of Rocky Coulee Wasteway, a mix of the intermittent Rocky Coulee Creek and irrigation runoff from the East Low Canal. Before the CBP there was no perennial flow between Brook Lake and Moses Lake. Only during periods of high water did Crab Creek flow through this area.

Moses Lake empties into Potholes Reservoir, which feeds irrigation canals to the south. Below O'Sullivan Dam several springs renew Crab Creek, which flows southwest, then west. Below the community of Smyrna, Crab Creek meanders across a two mile-wide canyon, bounded on the south by Saddle Mountains and on the north by the Royal Slope and containing portions of the Columbia National Wildlife Refuge, before emptying into the Columbia River.

== Lakes ==
Before 1904, drifting sand dunes blocked Crab Creek below Moses Lake, the largest natural lake on the creek. The creek's water did not reach the Columbia River. A large flood in 1904 washed through the dunes, lowering the lake by eight feet. Before the 1904 flood Crab Creek and Moses Lake's connection to the Columbia was intermittent. Fish native to Moses Lake indicate some periods of connection before 1904. It is possible that sand dunes created Moses Lake by blocking Crab Creek.

The Columbia Basin Project in central Washington changed the character of Crab Creek substantially. The Crab Creek irrigation-return drainage basin covers an irrigated area of 296 mi^{2} (767 km^{2}). A large earthfill dam, the O'Sullivan Dam (also referred to as the Potholes Dam) was constructed from 1947 to 1949, forming Potholes Reservoir, which serves as a central point in the CBP for storage of irrigation water, natural runoff, and irrigation-return flow, allowing irrigation water reuse throughout the southern CBP area. Potholes Reservoir releases water through canals and has no perennial outlet to Lower Crab Creek. Hence today the water in Lower Crab Creek comes from ground-water seepage from Potholes Reservoir and irrigation, from the Goose Lake Wasteway, and from tributary inflows downstream of the O'Sullivan Dam. The water table in this section is variable but generally high due to the low elevation and irrigation runoff. Many lakes, including Merry, Lenice and Nunally Lakes, drain into Crab Creek.

== History ==
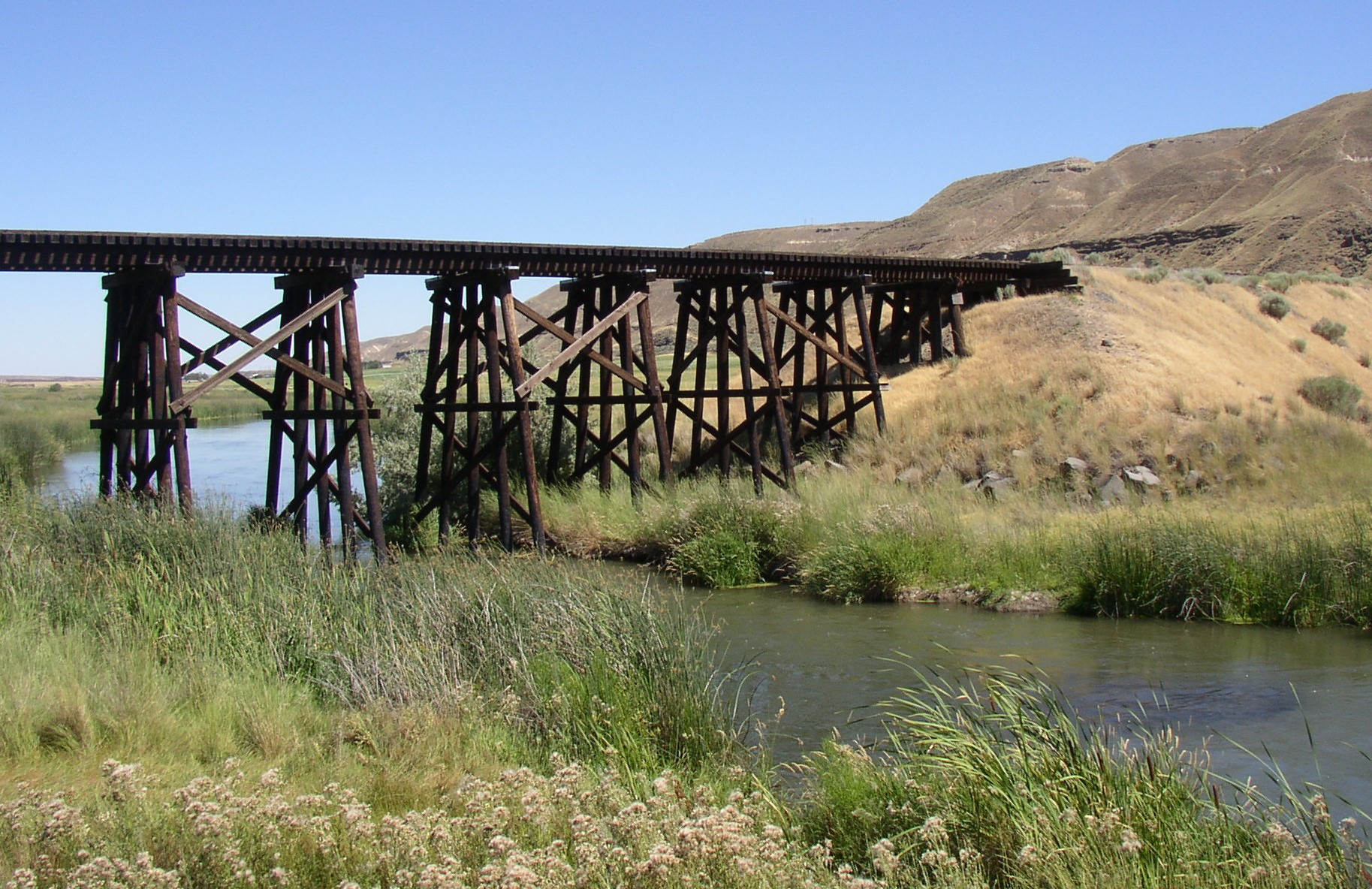
Lower Crab Creek 8 miles (13 km) above the confluence with the Columbia River looking east. Saddle Mountains to the right.

Since it is one of the few creeks in the region with reliable water, Spokane and Palouse Indigenous peoples utilized the area along Crab Creek to gather roots and other food. A main trail through the region followed the creek. Lt. Symons came past the mid-Crab Creek area while laying out the Military Wagon Road from Fort Walla Walla to Camp Chelan in 1879. The Old Wagon Road was established along the creek from Waterville, Washington to Ritzville, Washington in 1888.

Prior to establishing irrigation, most of the areas along Upper Crab Creek were bunchgrass prairie, which was suited to range cattle and sheep. Crab Creek and tributary creeks provided water for the herds. Although a handful of ranchers ran herds, shipping their bunchgrass-fed beef to Montana by rail from towns like Sprague, settlement remained extremely sparse. One such example was George Lucas, an Irish emigrant, who was Adams County's first permanent white settler. He established a way-station and raised cattle and horses at Cow Creek along the road to Fort Colville in 1869.

Lower Crab Creek provided the only available water in that shrub-steppe region and so became the nucleus of settlement. Ben and Sam Hutchinson built the first recorded cabin along Lower Crab Creek in 1884. Tom McManamon, a cattle rancher, arrived shortly thereafter, with the first homesteaders arriving in 1901 and the town of Othello being established in 1904.

When the Bureau of Reclamation located district offices in Othello in 1947 and built the Columbia Irrigation Project, the nature of the until then sparsely populated country changed dramatically.

== Geologic history ==
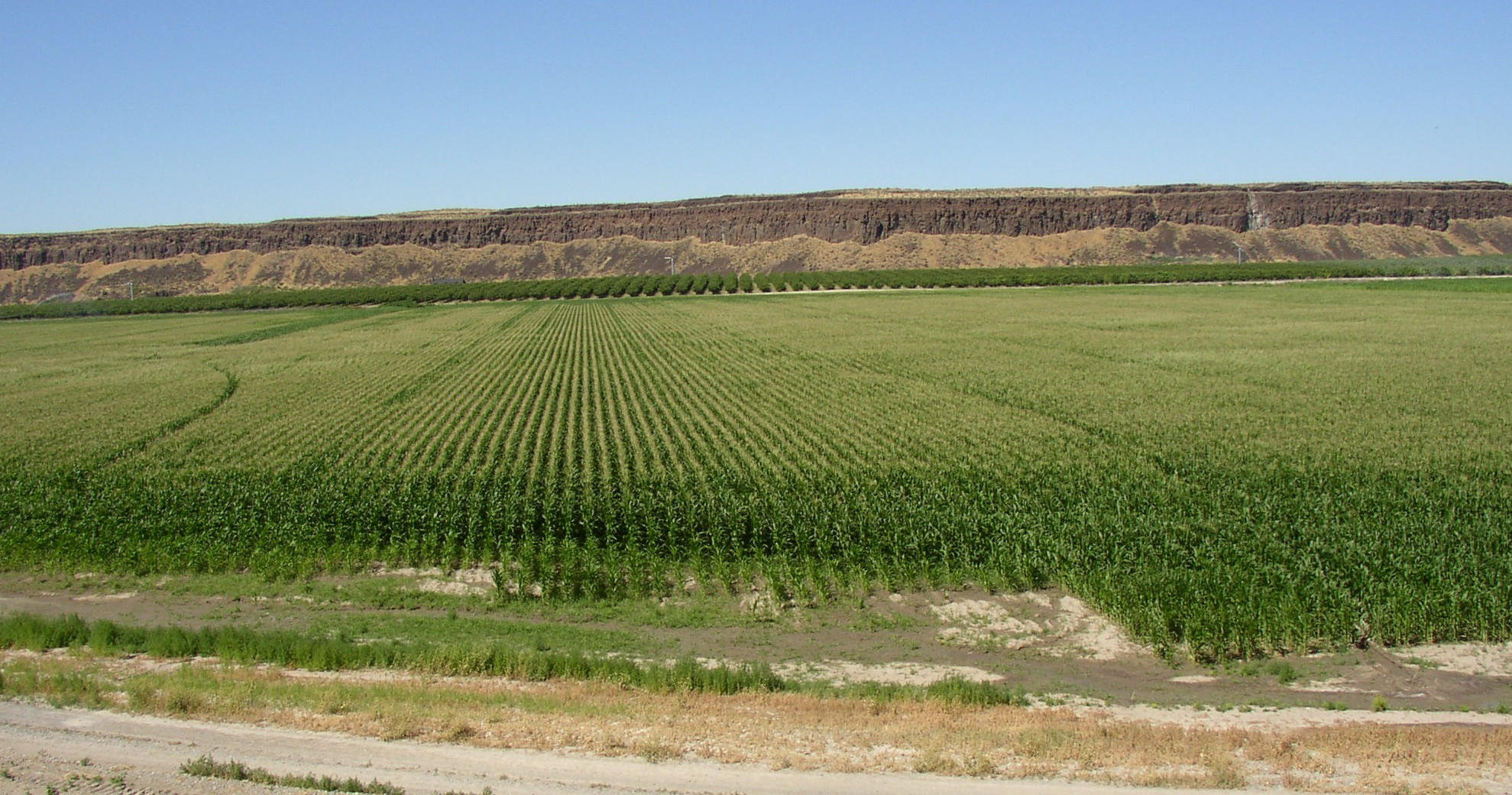
Oversized Crab Creek Coulee showing basalt on far side. Creek on far side of valley.

The Okanogan lobe of the Cordilleran Glacier moved down the Okanogan River valley and blocked the ancient route of the Columbia River, backing up water to create Lake Spokane. As the Okanogan lobe grew the Columbia was rerouted into the Grand Coulee. Flowing across the current Grand Coulee-Dry Falls region, the ice-age Columbia then entered the Quincy Basin near Quincy, Washington & joined Crab Creek at Moses Lake, following Crab Creek's course southward past the Frenchman Hills and turning west to run along the north face of the Saddle Mountains, there to rejoin the previous and modern course of the Columbia River just above the main water gap in the Saddle Mountains, Sentinel Gap.

During this period the Missoula Floods periodically discharged large volumes of water, some of which reached Upper Crab Creek by overtopping the divide between the Columbia drainage and the Crab Creek drainage, and some diverted into the Columbia River to enter Crab Creek at Moses Lake. As a result, substantial coulees and scablands were created in the Upper Crab Creek drainage, and the drainage below the Potholes Reservoir is overlarge (i.e., the channel sizes could contain a substantially larger river than currently flows there).

== Recreation ==
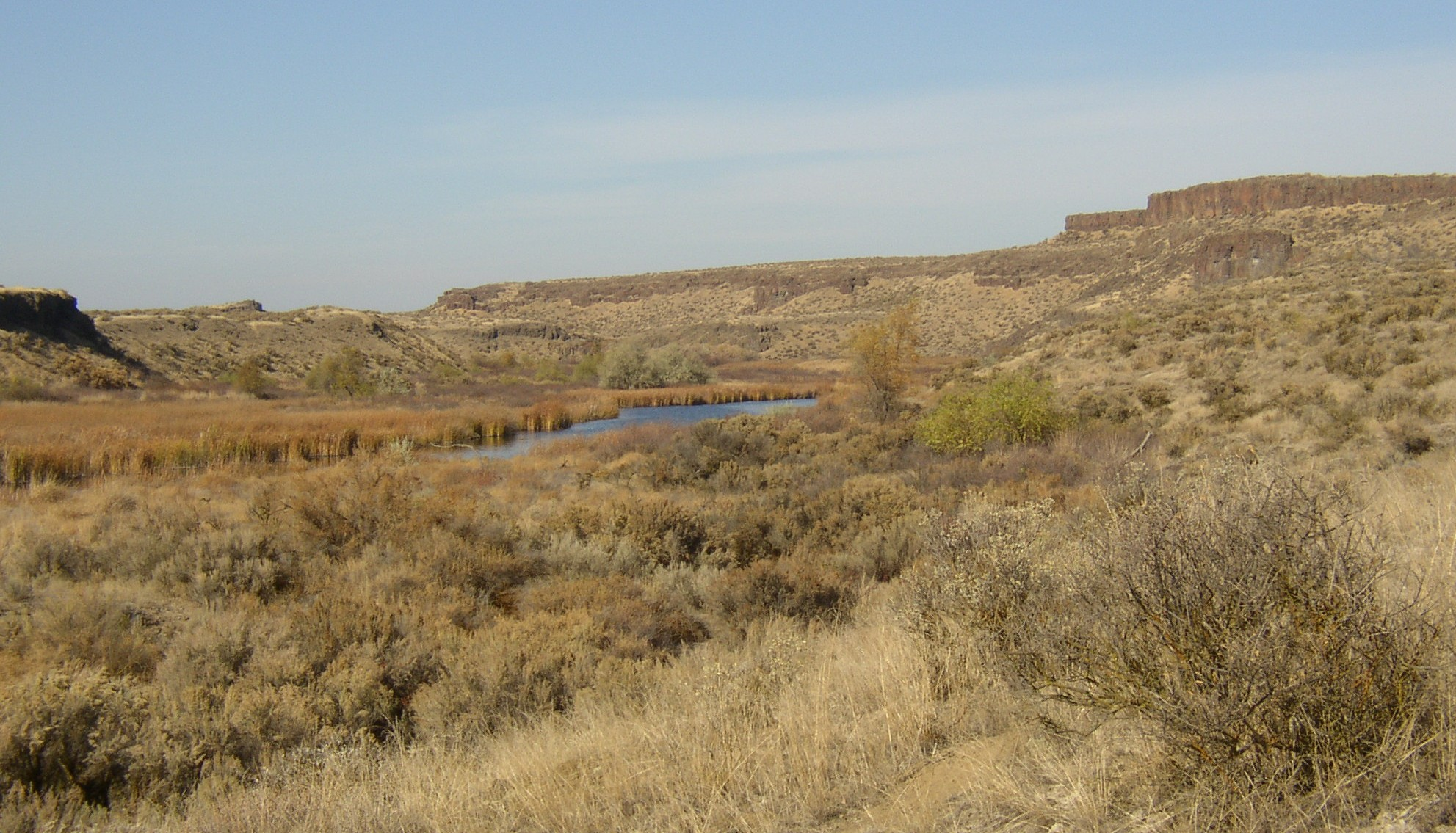
Crab Creek in the Drumheller Channels.

Potholes State Park is a 640-acre (260 ha) park on the shore of the Potholes Reservoir. It provides ready access to the Drumheller Channels National Natural Landmark which lies just downstream of the O'Sullivan Dam. This National Natural Landmark is an extensively eroded channeled scablands landscape, characterized by hundreds of isolated, steep-sided hills (buttes) surrounded by a braided network of numerous channels. All but the channel through which Crab Creek flows are currently dry. It is a classic example of the tremendous erosive powers of extremely large floods such as those that reformed the Columbia Plateau volcanic terrain during the late Pleistocene glacial Missoula Floods.

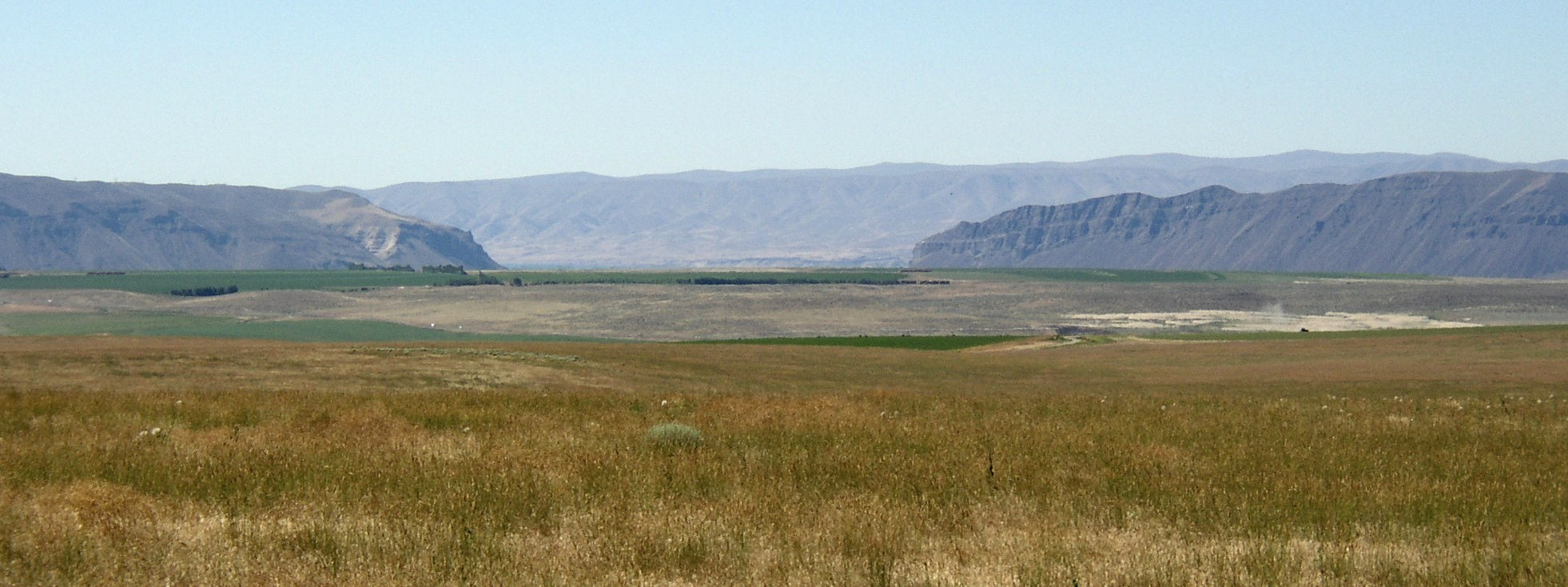
Sentinel Gap in the Saddle Mountains as seen from the north. Crab Creek flows along the face of the Saddle Mountains from the left to reach the Columbia River above the gap.

There are five wildlife areas found along Crab Creek:

- Crab Creek Wildlife Area runs from the Columbia River east along the north face of the Saddle Mountains until Othello, Washington.
- Seep Lakes Wildlife Area is colocated with Drumheller Channels National Natural Landmark.
- Potholes Wildlife Area is adjacent to Potholes Reservoir.
- Gloyd Seeps Wildlife Area is north of Moses Lake.
- North Columbia Basin Wildlife Area - Gloyd Seeps is north of Gloyd Seeps Wildlife Area

== See also ==
- List of rivers of Washington (state)
- Tributaries of the Columbia River
