= Chief Moses =

Chief of the Sinkiuse-Columbia tribe

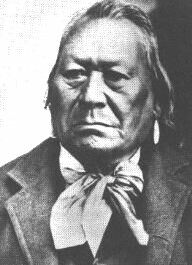
Chief Moses

Chief Moses (born Kwiltalahun, later called Sulk-stalk-scosum - "The Sun Chief") (c. 1829 – March 25, 1899) was a Native American chief of the Sinkiuse-Columbia, in what is now Washington state. The territory of his tribe extended approximately from Waterville to White Bluffs, in the Columbia Basin. They were often in the area around Moses Lake. The tribe numbered perhaps a few hundred individuals.

== Background ==
The boy Kwiltalahun was the third son of Sulk-stalk-scosum; his mother was Sulk-stalk-scosum's senior wife Kanitsa. He had two older brothers and four younger ones. In childhood he was named Loo-low-kin (Head Band), but in later life Chief Moses took the name of his father, Sulk-stalk-scosum. His people lived in the Moses Lake area.

At the age of nine, he so impressed the missionary Henry H. Spalding that he was invited to be educated at the Presbyterian Mission of Lapwai, Idaho, where for three years he learned the ways of whites and also made extensive contacts with Nez Perce, in whose territory the Mission was located. He became fluent in several languages, including English, Nez Perce, Spokane, Colville and Yakima, a skill that served him later in life. It was at the mission where he was given the Christian name "Moses" by Spalding, which he would go by for the rest of his life despite never officially becoming a Christian.

At the time of the Yakima War, his brother Kwilninuk was chief of the Sinkiuse-Columbia; Moses had a minor role and following their defeat in 1858 surrendered in Chewelah. While Moses was away from the tribe, being examined and later negotiating, the tribe proclaimed him their chief; when he returned to their encampment near Ephrata, he assumed the duties and the name of his deceased father.

He was chief of the Sinkiuse-Columbia for forty years, during which time white encroachment increased and so did conflict. He worked pragmatically to preserve his people by accommodation to the changing circumstances.

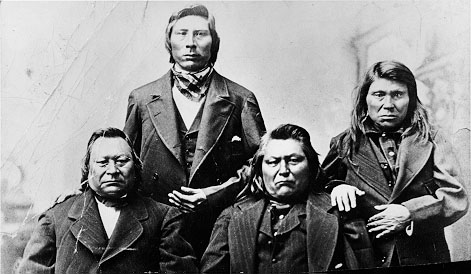
Sin-kah-you Chief Moses (seated on the left), and three other delegates sent to Washington, D.C., to petition President Hayes in 1879.

== Trial and acquittal ==
In 1878, a white couple was killed near Rattlesnake Springs by renegade Bannock and Paiute Indians. The military, however, blamed the incident on Chief Moses. He was captured near present-day O'Sullivan Dam and stood trial in Yakima, where he was acquitted.

According to Tribal records, Chief Moses was ordered to Washington, D.C., on February 12, 1879. He made the trip to with several other delegates, and met with President Rutherford B. Hayes. Possibly deducing that the verdict of his upcoming murder trial would depend upon whether or not he agreed to give up his land, he was quoted as telling the president, "You want this godforsaken land, fine." The charges against him for the murders of Mr. & Mrs. Perkins were dismissed months later that August 1879.

== Columbia Reservation ==
On April 18, 1879, the United States set aside the Columbia Reservation for Chief Moses and his tribe. The tribe agreed to cede their Columbia Basin territory, which was then opened for homesteading. The new reservation was bordered on the east by the Okanogan River (the western boundary of the Colville Indian Reservation), on the south by the Columbia River, on the west by the Chelan River, Lake Chelan and the crest of the Cascade Mountains, and on the north by the international boundary with Canada. This was some distance away from the tribe's original range (which was south of the Columbia), and the terrain was very different.

Approximately the same boundaries formed the Okanogan and Similkameen Mining District, originally organized in 1860. Lead and silver ore had been found in Toad's Coulee near the Canada–US border. The white settlers, miners and ranchers mostly, held a meeting on July 9, 1879, near Lake Osoyoos and drew up resolutions opposing the creation of the reservation and asking the government to appraise the value of their properties for compensation if the reservation did go ahead.

Interior Secretary Carl Schurz turned the matter over to the Bureau of Indian Affairs, with instructions that the white settlers would suffer no harm. Moses, however, had little respect for the Bureau and more for the army, so the army was given the job of administering the reservation. The army set up a camp at the southern end of Lake Chelan to do this.

Chief Moses complained about the white settlers on the reservation, since he had been promised whites would be kept out. Colonel Henry C. Merriman, the army commander, sent Captain H.C. Cook north on August 19, 1880 to list and assess the improvements made by the white settlers and to ask them to leave. He did this for seven settlers, estimating the value of their property at $3,577, much less than the owners' estimate of $11,000.

In late 1880 or in 1881, the military determined that there were 17 bona fide white residents of the region prior to April 18, 1879. However, fewer than 100 members of Moses's tribe had moved to the reservation. Moses himself did not live there, having relocated to the Colville Reservation just to the east of the Columbia Reservation when his tribe was expelled from the Columbia Basin. The settlers began a lobbying campaign to abolish the reservation and move the Sinkiuse-Columbia to the Colville Indian Reservation. Failing that, they asked for the return to white settlement of that portion of the reservation within 10 miles (16 km) of Canada. (Nearly all the mining claims were within that region.)

Violence broke out in 1882, with angry white settlers destroying Indian property. General Miles also feared an Indian uprising. Order was soon restored, however. On February 23, 1883, President Chester A. Arthur signed an executive order restoring a 15-mile (24 km) wide strip along the Canada–US border to the public domain. Chief Moses and other delegates were taken to Washington, D.C., for a conference to resolve the outstanding issues.

== Later developments ==
An agreement was reached on July 7, 1883, for the government to purchase the entire Columbia Reservation from the Indians. Those families formerly assigned to the reservation were to be given the choice of moving to the Colville Reservation or taking allotments of one section (1 sq mi or 2.6 km^{2}) of land each. By act of Congress on July 4, 1884, the entire reservation was restored to the public domain. On May 1, 1886, it was formally reopened for white settlement. The influx of settlers was so great that Okanogan County (roughly the same area as the Columbia Reservation) was split from Stevens County two years later.

Chief Moses died in 1899 on the Colville Reservation. He was buried there, near Nespelem, Washington.

Chief Moses once asked a follower to count the grains of sand in a pile. "There are too many," said the man. "It is the same with whites," replied Moses, "There are too many."

== Legacy ==
Moses Lake, Moses Coulee, and the city of Moses Lake are named for Chief Moses. One of the middle schools in Moses Lake was originally named for Chief Moses (now Columbia Middle School).

His relatives include Lucy Friedlander Covington (1910-1982) and Paulette Jordan (born December 7, 1979).
