= KRSC =

KRSC may refer to:

- KRSC (AM), a radio station (1400 AM) licensed to serve Othello, Washington, United States
- KRSC-FM, a radio station (91.3 FM) licensed to serve Claremore, Oklahoma, United States
- KKNW, a radio station (1150 AM) licensed to serve Seattle, Washington, which held the call sign KRSC from 1927 to 1949
- KING-FM, a radio station (98.1 FM) licensed to serve Seattle, Washington, which held the call sign KRSC-FM from 1947 to 1958
- KRSU-TV, a television station (channel 36/PSIP 35) licensed to serve Claremore, Oklahoma, which held the call sign KRSC-TV from 1992 to 2013
- Kurdistan Region Security Council, the national security council of Iraq's Kurdistan Regional Government
