= Drumheller Channels National Natural Landmark =

U.S. natural landmark in Washington state

Drumheller Channels
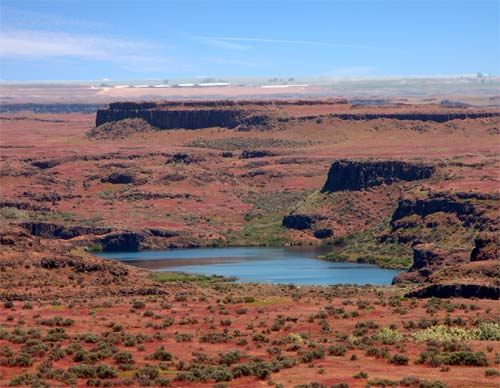
- Drumheller Channels

- Location within Washington (state)
- Location: south central Washington (state)
- Coordinates: 46°58′30″N 119°11′47″W
- Designated: 1986

Drumheller Channels National Natural Landmark showcases the Drumheller Channels, which are the most significant example in the Columbia Plateau of basalt butte-and-basin Channeled Scablands. This National Natural Landmark is an extensively eroded landscape, located in south central Washington state characterized by hundreds of isolated, steep-sided hills (buttes) surrounded by a braided network of numerous channels, all but one of which are currently dry. It is a classic example of the tremendous erosive powers of extremely large floods such as those that reformed the Columbia Plateau volcanic terrain during the late Pleistocene glacial Missoula floods.

In 1986, the U.S. National Park Service recognized the significance and natural beauty of Drumheller Channels by designating them a National Natural Landmark. The geologist who initially recognized and documented the evidence for the Ice-Age floods, J Harlen Bretz, wrote:

Drumheller is the most spectacular tract of butte-and basin scabland on the plateau. It is an almost unbelievable labyrinth of anastamosing channels, rock basins, and small abandoned cataracts.

Drumheller Channels connects the Quincy Basin, which lies to north, with the Othello Basin on the south. It can be reached most easily from Othello, Washington approximately 8 km (5.0 mi) northwest on McManamon Road, then north on Morgan Lake Road which passes through the Drumheller Channels region. The north/south Morgan Lake Road (gravel) passes through the heart of the channels following Crab Creek. Hikes can be taken, including an interpretive trail, from the wetlands along Crab Creek to the views from an isolated butte, that allow the hiker to gain a sense of this unique landscape. The Drumheller Channels can also be seen from the paved State Route 262 which runs to the north of the area along the top of the Potholes Reservoir dam (which has inundated part of the scablands) and from the west side from the heights of the Frenchman Hills.

== Etymology ==
The Drumheller Channels are named for the humble, impoverished, farming family that, in 1922, gave basic over-night hospitality to J Harlen Bretz and his three students who were mapping the area on foot.

== Route of the ancient Columbia River ==
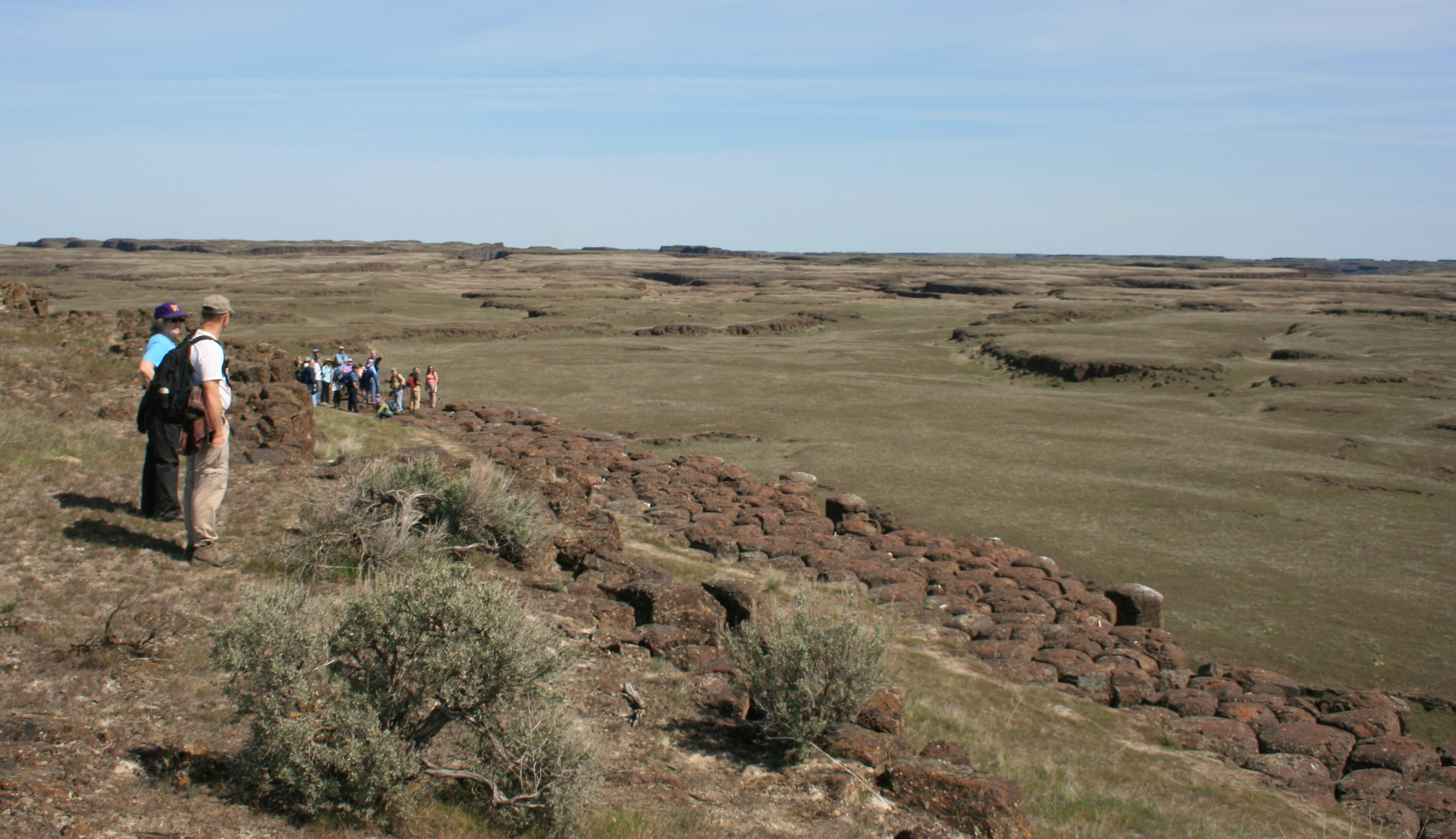
Ice Age Floods Institute tour of the Drumheller Channels; note the two people in the foreground and the group in the background that provide perspective in the large-scale erosion here.

The Okanogan lobe of the Cordilleran Glacier moved down the Okanogan River valley and blocked the ancient route of the Columbia River, backing up water to create Lake Spokane. Initially water discharged from Lake Spokane by running up through the head of Grand Coulee and down through Foster Coulee to rejoin the Columbia River. As the glacier moved further south, Foster Coulee was cut off and the Columbia River then discharged through Moses Coulee, which runs southward slightly to the east of the ancient and current course of the Columbia. As the Okanogan lobe grew, it blocked Moses Coulee as well; the Columbia found the next lowest route through the region which was eroded to become the modern Grand Coulee. Flowing across the current Grand Coulee and Dry Falls regions, the ice age Columbia then entered the Quincy Basin and joined Crab Creek, following Crab Creek's course southward past the Frenchman Hills and turning west to run along the north face of the Saddle Mountains and rejoin the previous and modern course of the Columbia River just above the main water gap in the Saddle Mountains, Sentinel Gap.

== Formation of the Drumheller Channels ==
The Missoula Floods discharged into Lake Spokane, through the Grand Coulee, greatly enlarging it, passed over Dry Falls and then ponded in and inundated the Quincy Basin, covering over 1,500 km^{2} (580 sq mi) and creating the Ephrata Fan (a deposit of boulders, cobbles, and pebbles where the flood waters discharged into the basin). The discharge volume was so great that water overflowed Lake Spokane in multiple places and also reached the Quincy Basin via the Telford-Crab Creek scablands and Lind Coulee (both entering the basin from the east). When floodwaters encountered the Frenchman Hills, their level was high enough that, although the bulk of the water passed through the Crab Creek drainage, some water spilled west over the low points of three divides along Evergreen and Babcock ridges to reach the Columbia river channel at Frenchman Coulee to the southwest, Potholes Coulee to the north central and Crater Coulee to the northwest. The bulk of the floodwaters took the easiest path, straight south through the Drumheller Channels stretch of Crab Creek.

The elevation drop of the floodwaters as they passed through the Drumheller Channels was greater than 50 meters (160 ft) over a distance of 20 km (12 mi) with gradients locally ranging from 2–12 m/km). This hydraulic head combined with a flow depth of from 60 to 120 meters (200 to 390 ft) provided the energy to achieve flood flow velocities as high as 30 m/s (65 mph), which eroded the topsoil and underlying basalt, gouging the complex network of channels, basins, potholes and buttes that are found there even today. Examples of scabland features, such as large kolk-excavated potholes, provide evidence of the tremendous powers of the floods.

There is a unique character to the Drumheller Channels; unlike most other Channeled Scabland zones, no single centralized channel or major cataracts were formed. In the Drumheller Channels the floodwaters passing through in a broad cascade of 13–20 km (8.1–12.4 mi) in width. Bretz recorded 150 distinct channels and over 180 rock basins in this region. Many of the low areas, including Upper Goose Lake, are filled by water seeping in through cracks in the basalt bedrock, which are connected with Potholes Reservoir to the north.

== Impacts of early settlement ==
The impact of settlement was severe; in the 1860s overgrazing depleted most of the few native grasses. Government surveys of the 1880s identified much of the region as badlands.

== Bureau of Reclamation actions ==
In 1934, the U.S. Bureau of Reclamation initiated construction on the Grand Coulee Dam on the Columbia River about 100 miles (200 km) north of the Drumheller Channels. Grand Coulee was only one part of the Columbia Basin Project, which included four major storage reservoirs, hundreds of pumping plants, 2,300 miles (3,700 km) of canals and laterals to irrigate the region. Irrigation began in 1951, raising the water table. By 1980, when the last stage of the project was completed, the area of wetlands in the Columbia Basin was at least 20 times larger than it had been earlier as a result of seepage and a raised water table. Migrating waterfowl were drawn to the region by the water and by greatly increased food supplies from the adjacent farmlands.

== Columbia National Wildlife Refuge ==
The Columbia National Wildlife Refuge is colocated with the Drumheller Channels. Adjacent areas are included in the Seep Lakes Wildlife Area. More than 200 species of mammals and birds can be found in the cliffs, marshes, grasslands, lakes, seeps, and other riparian areas.
