= Frenchman Coulee =

Coordinates: 47°1′50″N 119°57′45″W

Frenchman Coulee

Frenchman Coulee is an erosional feature left behind by the great Ice Age floods, a spectacular dual coulee and recessional-cataract complex in the western Quincy Basin.

== Description and formation ==
In the Pacific Northwest, "coulee" refers to steep-sided, flat-floored, straight channels eroded in basalt bedrock by Ice Age floods. Frenchman Coulee is actually two parallel coulees–old U.S. Route 10 follows the northern coulee while roadless "Echo Basin" is the southern branch.

Frenchman Coulee formed when Ice Age floodwaters flowed down the Grand Coulee and across the Quincy Basin. It is one of four main outlets for floodwaters in the Quincy Basin. Crater Coulee and Potholes Coulee lie to the north while the Drumheller Channels lie to the southeast.

Floodwaters exiting the basin through Frenchman Coulee dropped over 600 feet (180 m) to the Columbia River Valley, creating a significant waterfall. The coulee formed as floodwaters spilled over, and eroded, the Columbia River Valley wall. Over time, this waterfall receded headwardly approximately two miles (3.5 km) to its present position. Plunge pools lie at the foot of each of the falls at each coulee head marking the final positions of the waterfalls.

A linear mesa separates the two coulees while flood bars and dunes cover the coulee floors.

== Rock climbing ==
The area is popular for rock climbing. Washington Department of Natural Resources manages the site, as part of the Columbia Basin Wildlife Area. Mountaineer Göran Kropp died while climbing at Frenchman Coulee.
