= Saddle Mountains =

Ridge in Washington, United States

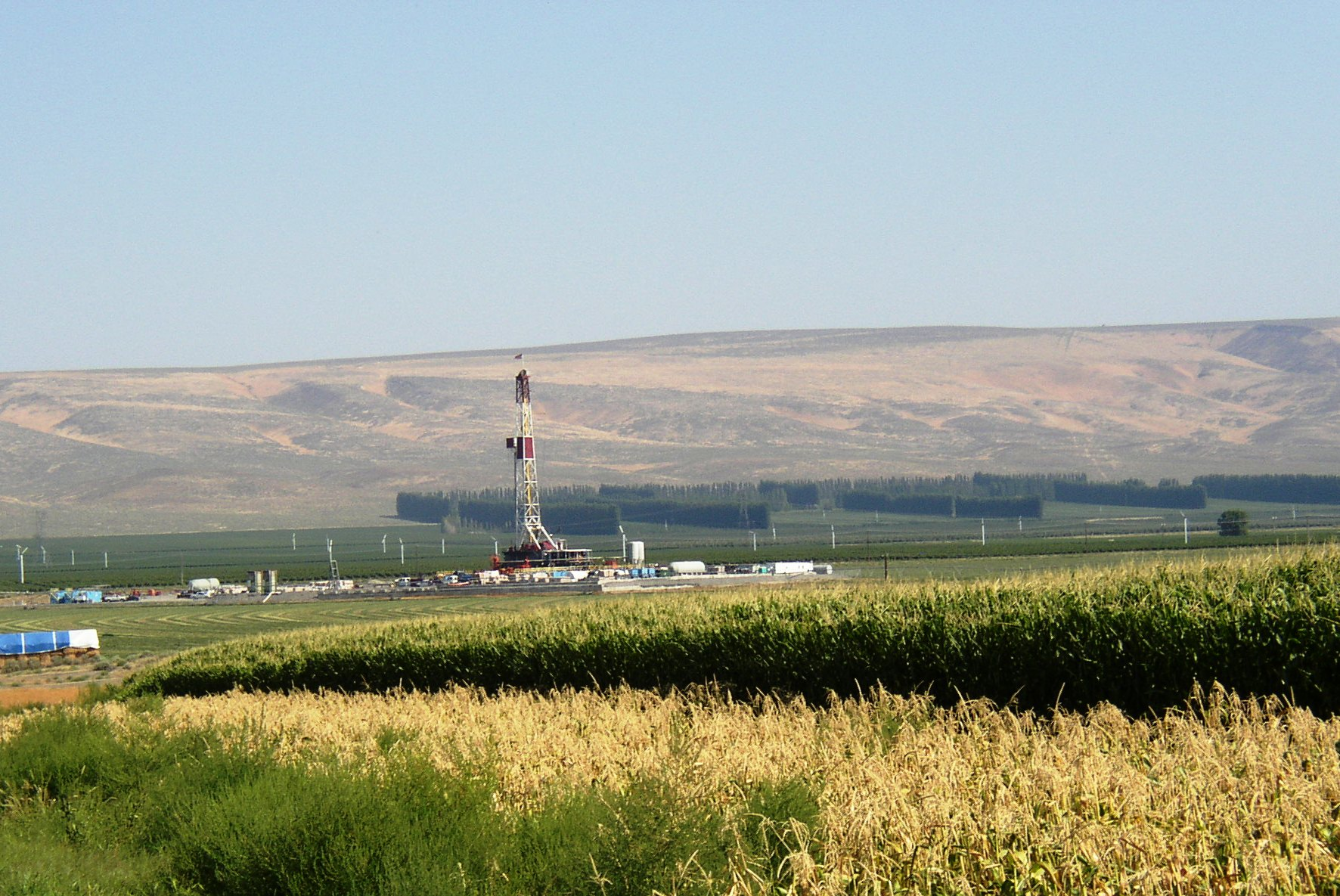
- The Saddle Mountains as seen from the south in the summer of 2006. Note gas drilling rig in the foreground.

Highest point
- Peak: Wahatis Peak
- Elevation: 2,634 ft (803 m)

Geography
- Country: United States
- State: Washington
- County: Grant County
- Range coordinates: 46°48′24″N 119°33′28″W

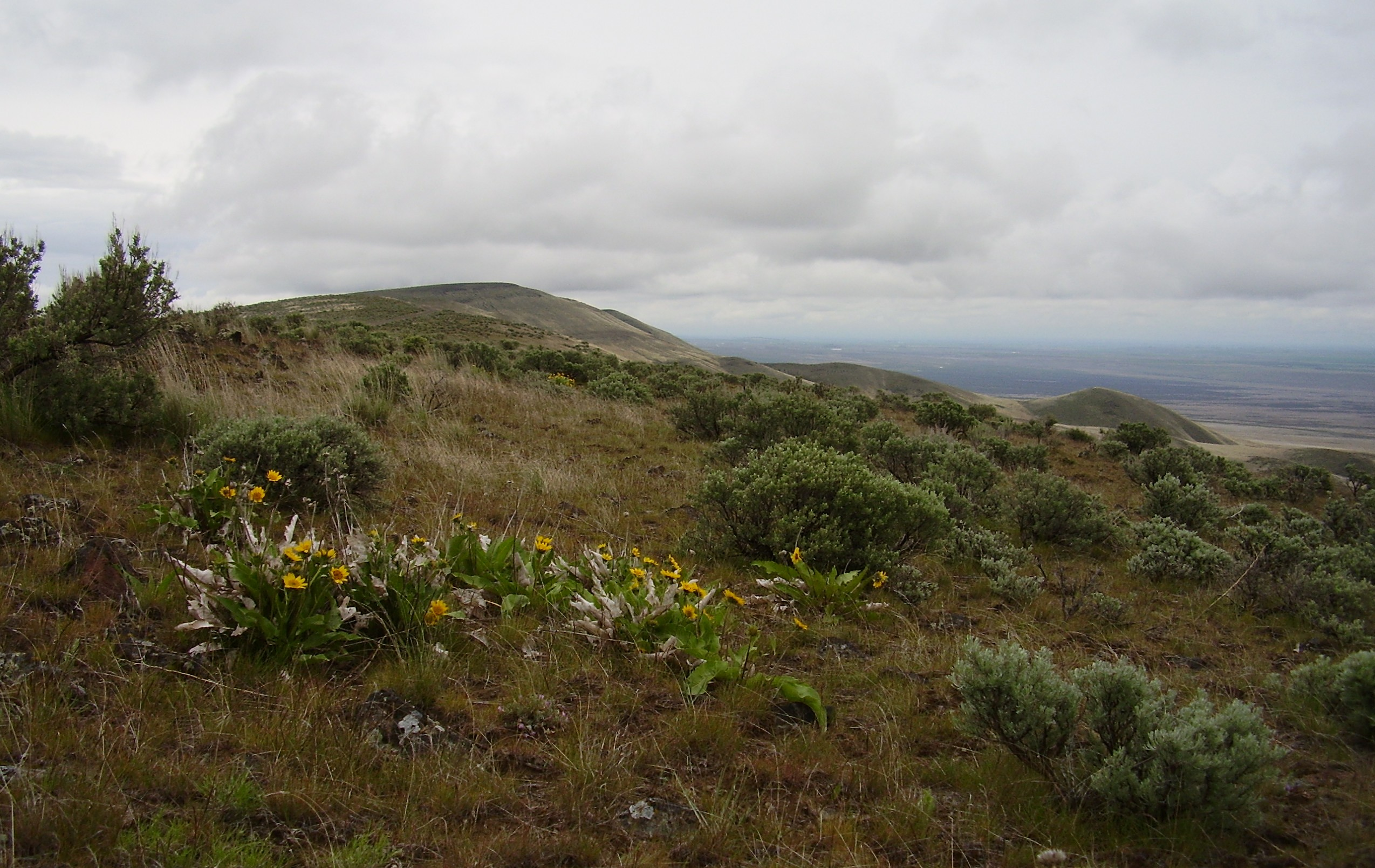
The Saddle Mountains as seen from the ridgeline looking toward the east in the Wahluke Wildlife Refuge section; photo taken in the spring of 2007

The Saddle Mountains consists of an upfolded anticline ridge of basalt in Grant County of central Washington state. The ridge, reaching to 2,700 feet, terminates in the east south of Othello, Washington near the foot of the Drumheller Channels. It continues to the west where it is broken at Sentinel Gap (a water gap through which the Columbia River passes) before ending in the foothills of the Cascade Mountains.

== Saddle Mountains geology ==
The top exposed layer of Columbia River Basalt Group basalt in the Saddle Mountains is the Saddle Mountain Basalt, which ranges from 120–240 meters (390–790 ft) in thickness and is interspersed by sedimentary layers of the Ellensburg Formation. The Saddle Mountain Basalt is composed of the Umatilla Member flows, the Wilbur Creek Member flows, the Asotin Member flows (13 million years ago), the Weissenfels Ridge Member flows, the Esquatzel Member flows, the Elephant Mountain Member flows (10.5 million years ago), the Bujford Member flows, the Ice Harbor Member flows (8.5 million years ago) and the Lower Monumental Member flows (6 million years ago).

The Cordilleran Glacier diverted the ancient route of the Columbia River 15,000 years ago, backing up water to create Lake Spokane. As the Okanogan lobe grew the Columbia was rerouted into the Grand Coulee. Flowing across the current Grand Coulee-Dry Falls region, the ice-age Columbia then entered the Quincy Basin near Quincy, Washington and joined Crab Creek at Moses Lake, following Crab Creek's course southward past the Frenchman Hills and turning west to run along the north face of the Saddle Mountains, there to rejoin the previous and modern course of the Columbia River just above the main water gap in the Saddle Mountains, Sentinel Gap. It eroded the north face of the Saddle Mountains, creating the conditions for the Corfu Slide.

== Geography ==
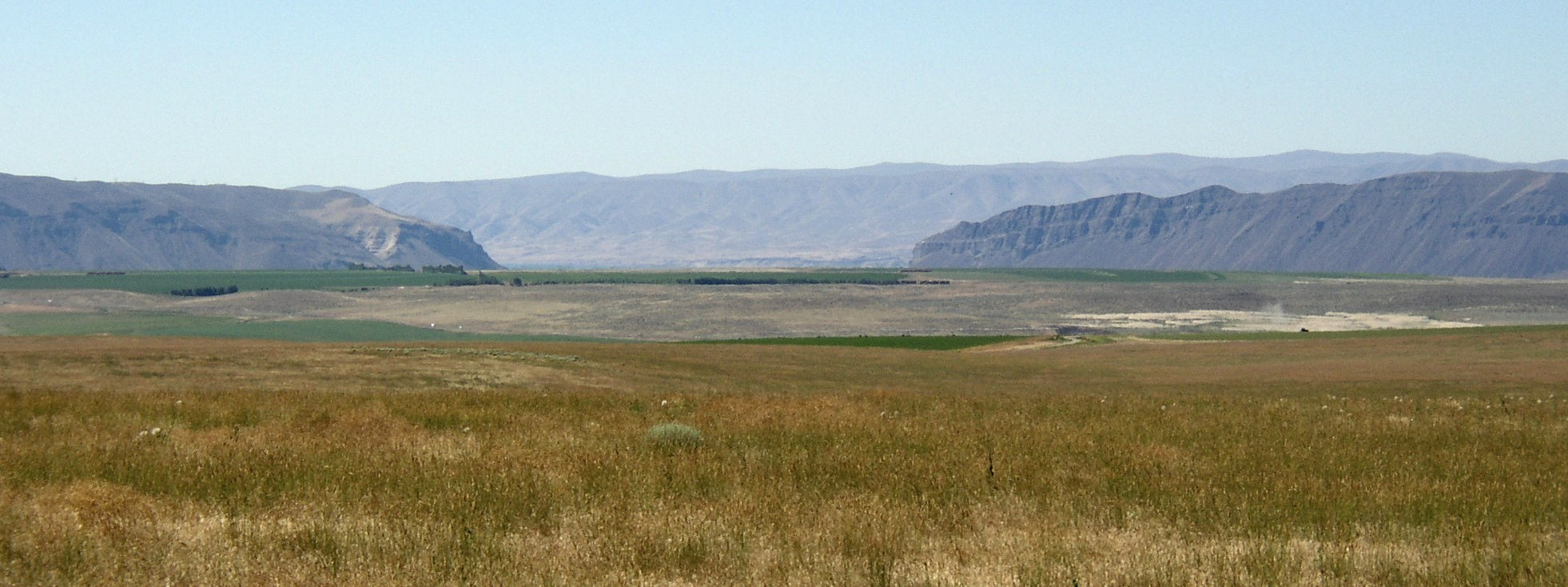
Sentinel Gap in the Saddle Mountains as seen from the north

Location	Coordinates
Eastern portion of Saddle Mountains where Lower Crab Creek meets the Corfu Slide	46°49′00″N 119°22′30″W
Red Rock Coulee area	46°49′20″N 119°35′00″W
Sentinel Gap through which the Columbia River passes	46°49′00″N 119°54′00″W
Corfu Slide region of Saddle Mountains	46°47′52″N 119°35′00″W

== See also ==
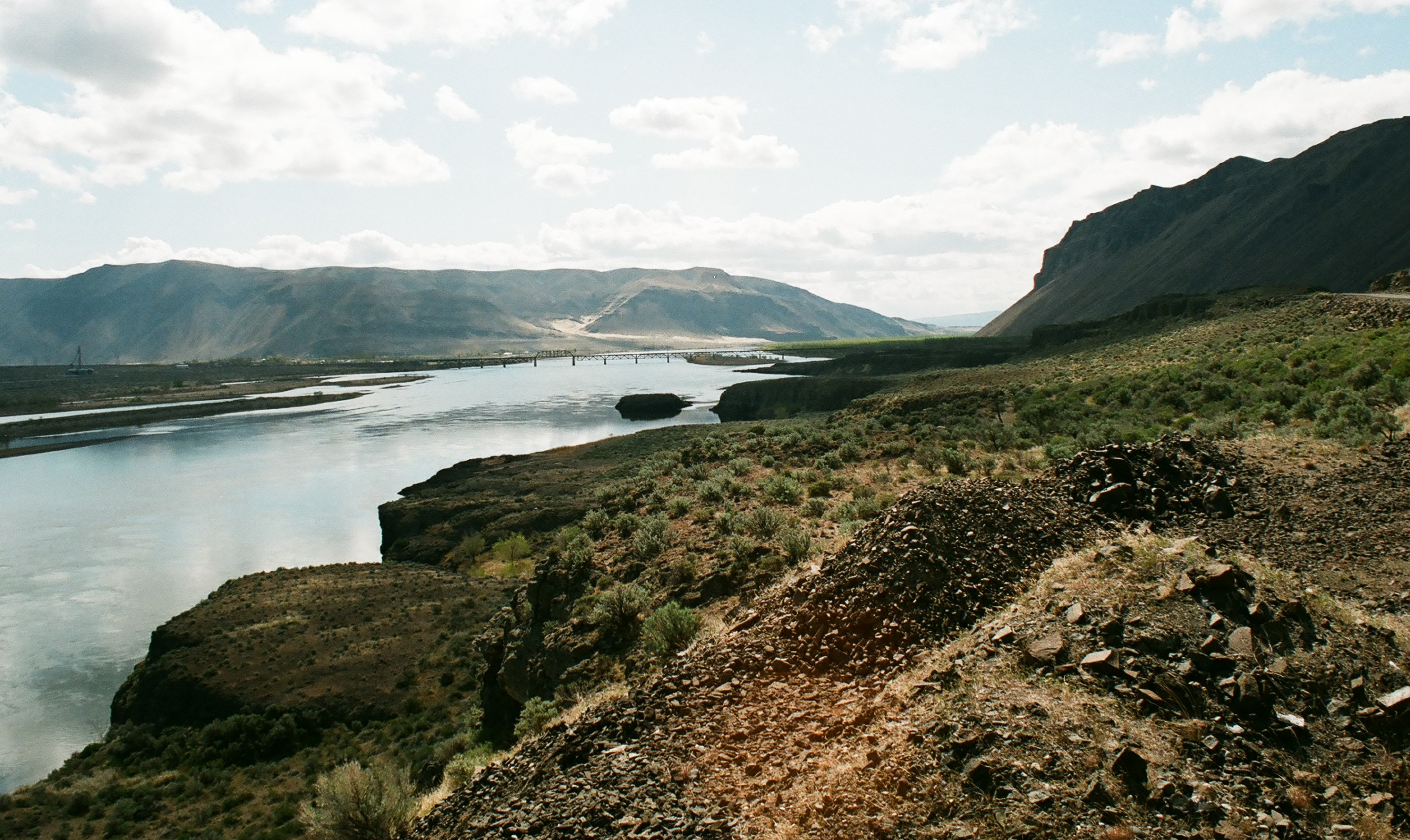
Sentinel Gap in the Saddle Mountains as seen from the west bank of the Columbia River above the Wanapum Dam

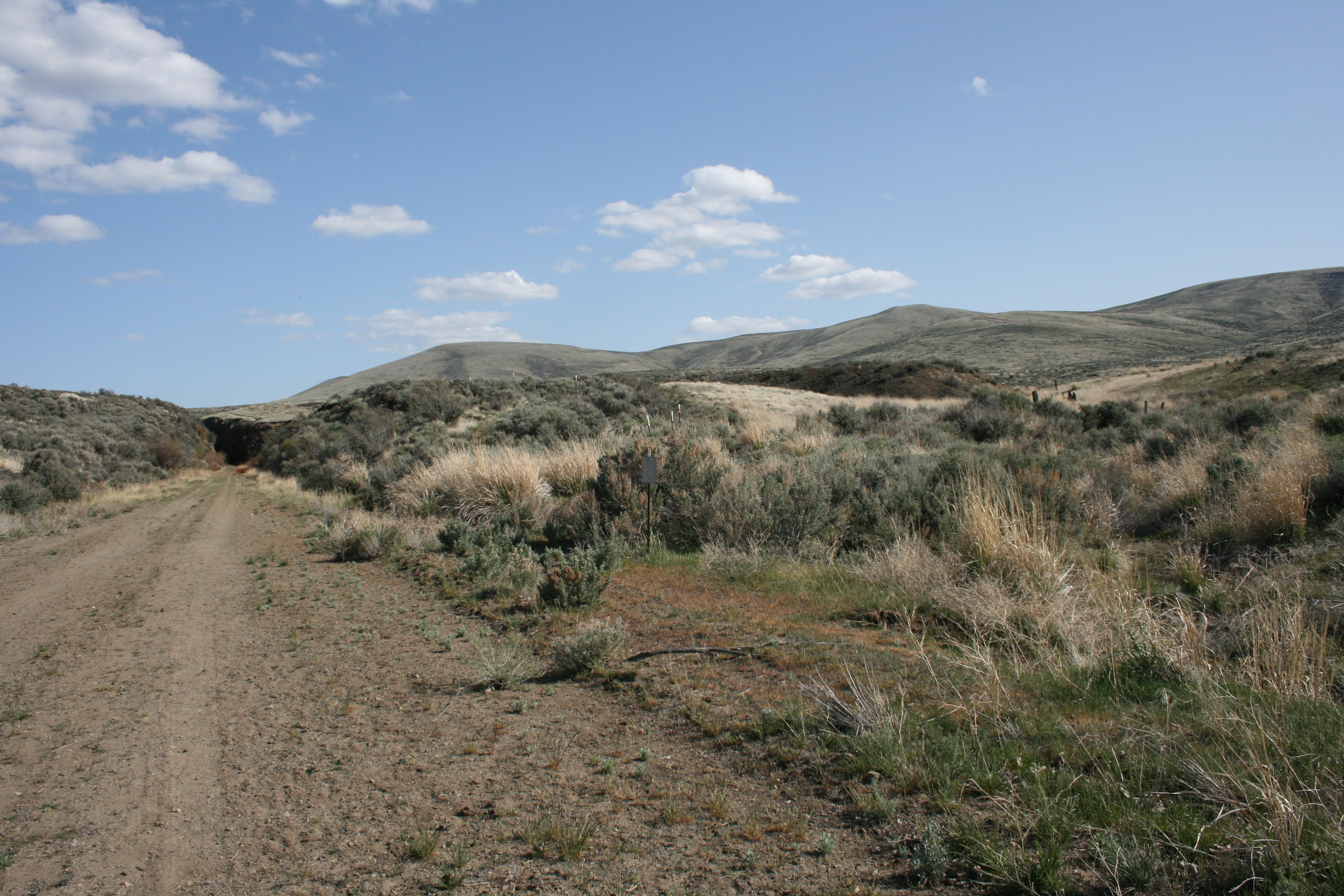
The Saddle Mountains as seen from the John Wayne Pioneer Trail; photo looking east southeasterly at Boylston tunnel

- Saddle Mountain National Wildlife Refuge
- List of mountain ranges in Washington
