= Othello Outlook =

- "From the Heart of the Columbia Basin"
- Type: Weekly newspaper
- Owner: Basin Publishing
- Founder: John A. Jenson
- Publisher: LuAnn Morgan
- Founded: 1947
- Ceased publication: 2016
- Language: English
- Circulation: 1,600 (as of 2016)
- ISSN: 1056-8328
- OCLC number: 16993162
- Website: othellooutlook.com

The Othello Outlook was a weekly newspaper based out of Othello, Washington. It was published from 1947 to 2016.

== History ==
In January 1948, John A. Jenson published the first edition of the Othello Progress News. In 1951, G. W. Crisman, president of the Leader Publishing company, announced the paper had been sold to Warren Baslee, with Bruce A. Wilson acquiring an interest. At that time the paper's name was changed to the Othello Outlook. Baslee edited the paper for four years.

In 1955, Baslee sold the paper to the Basin Publishing Co. W.R. Twining was named managing editor. The company was owned by Mist Publishing Co., which was owned by Jessica L. Longston. Later that year Twining was succeeded by Robert Shaw, previously the advertising manager at the Canby Herald.

Shaw was a philosopher turned journalist. He doubled circulation and was known for having a "forthright editorial policy." Shaw was against progressive education and farmland ownership size increases in the Columbia Basin, while an advocate for the Priest Rapids Dam. He predicted the Outlook would grow to become a daily within four years. Shaw was succeeded as manager in 1957 by Melvin Hirning, the shop foreman.

In 1958, R.D. "Dan" Leary was named publisher. He also managed KRSC (AM). In 1972, the paper moved into a new office. Leary went on to serve as president of the Washington Newspaper Publishers Association and was named "Citizen of the Year" in 1991 by the Greater Othello Chamber of Commerce. Dean H. Judd also edited the paper for decades. In 1995, Mark Grim was hired as editor. Longston owned several radio stations and newspapers throughout her life. She owned the Outlook until her death in 1997.

Basin Publishing then passed into the hands of Longston's son Greg D. Zaser. Around 2007, Eric LaFontaine was named publisher. In July 2016, the Othello Outlook ceased publication. At the time of closure LuAnn Morgan worked as publisher.
