= Lucy Covington =

Native American activist (1910–1982)

- Born: November 24, 1910
- Died: September 20, 1982 (aged 71); Nespelem, Washington
- Other name: Lucy Friedlander Covington
- Occupations: Native American tribal leader and political activist
- Relatives: Paulette Jordan, Chief Moses (Grandfather)

Lucy Friedlander Covington (November 24, 1910 – September 20, 1982) was a Native American tribal leader and political activist. She was a member of the Colville tribe which has a reservation in north-eastern Washington state. Covington was the granddaughter of the last Colville chief (Chief Moses) to be acknowledged by the tribe. She was the daughter of Nellie Moses and Louis T. Friedlander Sr.

== Political activism ==
In the 1950s, termination became the governmental policy when dealing with Indians, and officials were describing the procedure as "Indian emancipation from oppressive supervision." However, the reality of the situation was much darker because termination would entail the loss of tribal land which was essential to Colville and Native American Identity. When the termination bill for the Colville was proposed, Covington saw that her tribe was in danger of losing what she viewed as the Indian's most vital asset. Through the use of self-determination, she waged a war on the government and the termination bill.

One problem Covington faced from the beginning of her struggle was that many tribal members thought that termination would be "modern and productive." She had been on the tribal council since 1956, and many other members favored termination. Instead of giving in to governmental pressure, Covington went to great lengths to protect tribal lands. She sold some of her cattle (a vital component of her livelihood considering she lived on a ranch) and used the money to fund her repeated trips to Washington, D.C. where she fought to prevent Senator Henry M. Jackson of Washington from passing the termination bill. Covington utilized unique methods and strategies to gain support for her cause. With her magnetic personality, she organized younger members in the tribe to assist in her efforts and even helped create a Colville newspaper titled Our Heritage. This helped raise awareness for her campaign and also stood as a dedication to Indian culture. Whenever a tribal council member would present an outline for termination to Congress, Covington protested, and in 1968 she created an anti-termination platform for the tribal election. She enlisted the help of the Menominee leader Jim White to speak to her tribe about the actual effects of termination. After all of her lobbying, anti-termination advocates won a majority of the seats in the election.

Covington had successfully changed her tribal mindset, and the new council stamped out the termination bill for good in 1971. This started a new era, as tribal capitals were able to use their sovereignty to reverse decisions made by Washington. Through individual activism and determination, Covington helped keep Colville tribal sovereignty intact, and her persistence halted the liquidation and dismemberment of the Colville Reservation.

== Fighting termination ==
After the termination struggle, Covington "worked with characteristic determination to protect tribal rights and resources, develop tribal services, govern the reservation for the benefit of tribe members, and promote inter-tribal cooperation." Not only was she an example of Native American self-determination in action, but she was also a founder of the movement itself. Her efforts (along with Ada Deer and other civil rights leaders) engendered a shift of U.S. policy from termination to independence and autonomy.

== Death ==
In 1982, when she was seventy-one years old, Lucy Covington died of pulmonary fibrosis.

== The Lucy Covington Center ==
In 2015, Eastern Washington University decided to build the Lucy Covington center to honor and remember her powerful activism. It serves as a place to educate and cultivate young Native Americans into future leaders to follow in Lucy's footsteps.
