= KRSC (AM) =

- Othello, Washington; United States
- Frequency: 1400 kHz

Programming
- Format: Regional Mexican

Ownership
- Owner: Centro Familiar Cristiano

Technical information
- Licensing authority: FCC
- Facility ID: 25350
- Class: C
- Power: 1,000 watts unlimited
- Transmitter coordinates: 46°49′29″N 119°11′26″W
- Translator: (101.5 MHz) K268DM (Othello)

Links
- Public license information: Public file; LMS
- Website: laestaciondelafamilia.org

KRSC (1400 AM) is a radio station licensed to Othello, Washington, United States. The station is currently owned by Centro Familiar Cristiano.
