= Equalizing basin =

Hydroelectric power station reservoir

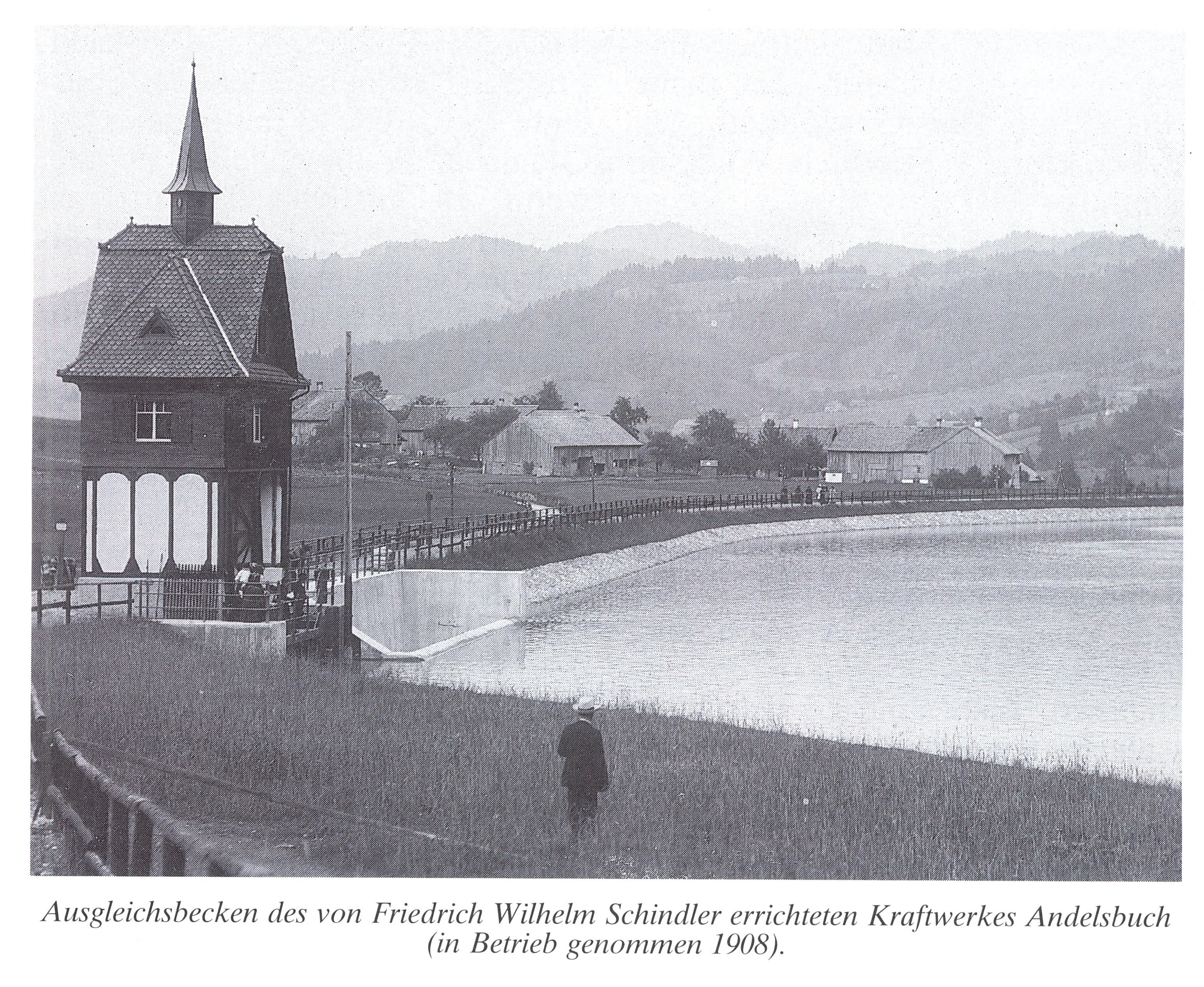
Andelsbuch equalizing basin, built in 1908

An equalizing basin (German: Ausgleichsbecken) or equalizing reservoir regulates the flow of water below an intermittently operated hydropower station or peaking power plant. This could be a part-load power station (Teillast-Durchfluss-Kraftwerk) or a storage power station. Also called a balancing reservoir.

== Function ==
The hydropower station sited above the basin works only a few hours a day. Often it is only used to generate peak current electricity. During hours of low current demand, the power station switches off in order to save the water available in the headstream for the valuable peak power times.

Without some form of equalization, however, the tailwaters would run dry when the turbines shut down. This would result in extremely low levels of water, causing serious problems for the plants and animals that live in and around the stream or river.

In general, therefore, the power station operator today is required to regulate the flow in order to ensure a specified minimum level of water flow into the tailwaters. During periods when the turbines are running (peak current generation) the equalizing basin fills up; during periods when the turbines are shut down, the basin drains gradually.

In the main, equalizing basins are small reservoirs located below a larger dam and reservoir system.

The water flowing out of the equalizing basin into the tailstream can be used in a run-of-river power station.
