= Potholes State Park =

State park in Washington, United States

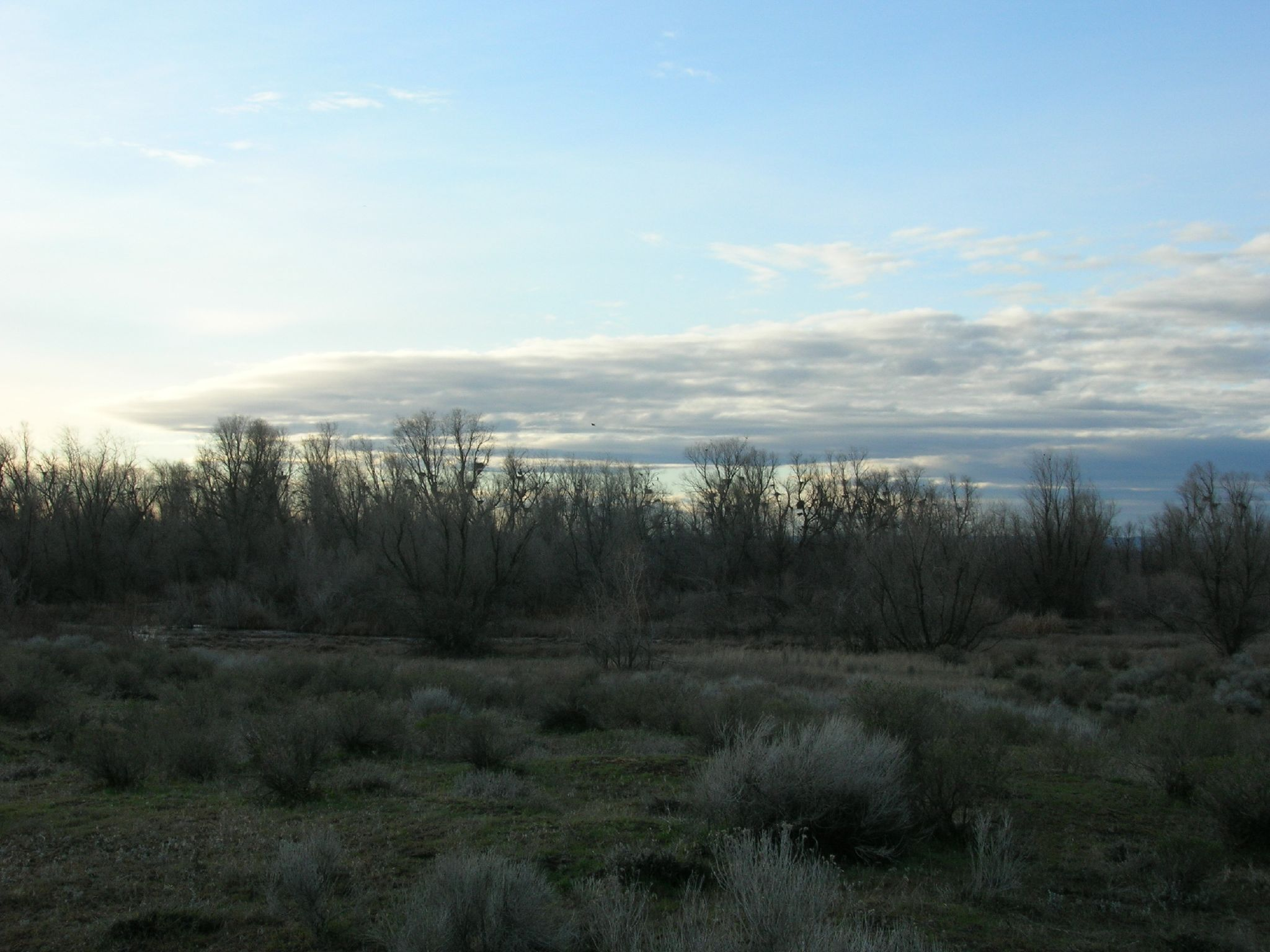
- Sagebrush steppe with black-crowned night-heron rookery in the distant trees, Potholes State Park, April 2006

- Location within Washington (state) Location within the United States
- Location: Grant County, Washington, United States
- Coordinates: 46°58′46″N 119°21′03″W
- Area: 273 acres (110 ha)
- Elevation: 1,063 ft (324 m)
- Established: 1973; 53 years ago (dedication)
- Administrator: Washington State Parks and Recreation Commission
- Website: Official website

Potholes State Park is a public recreation area on the southern shore of Potholes Reservoir, located 13 miles (21 km) south of Moses Lake and 13 miles (21 km) northwest of Othello in Grant County, Washington. The state park was created following the completion of the O'Sullivan Dam in 1949. The park's 773 acres (313 ha) include 6,000 feet (1,800 m) of shoreline and facilities for camping, hiking, boating, swimming, fishing, and other water activities. The park has access to Potholes Reservoir.
