= Moses Lake =

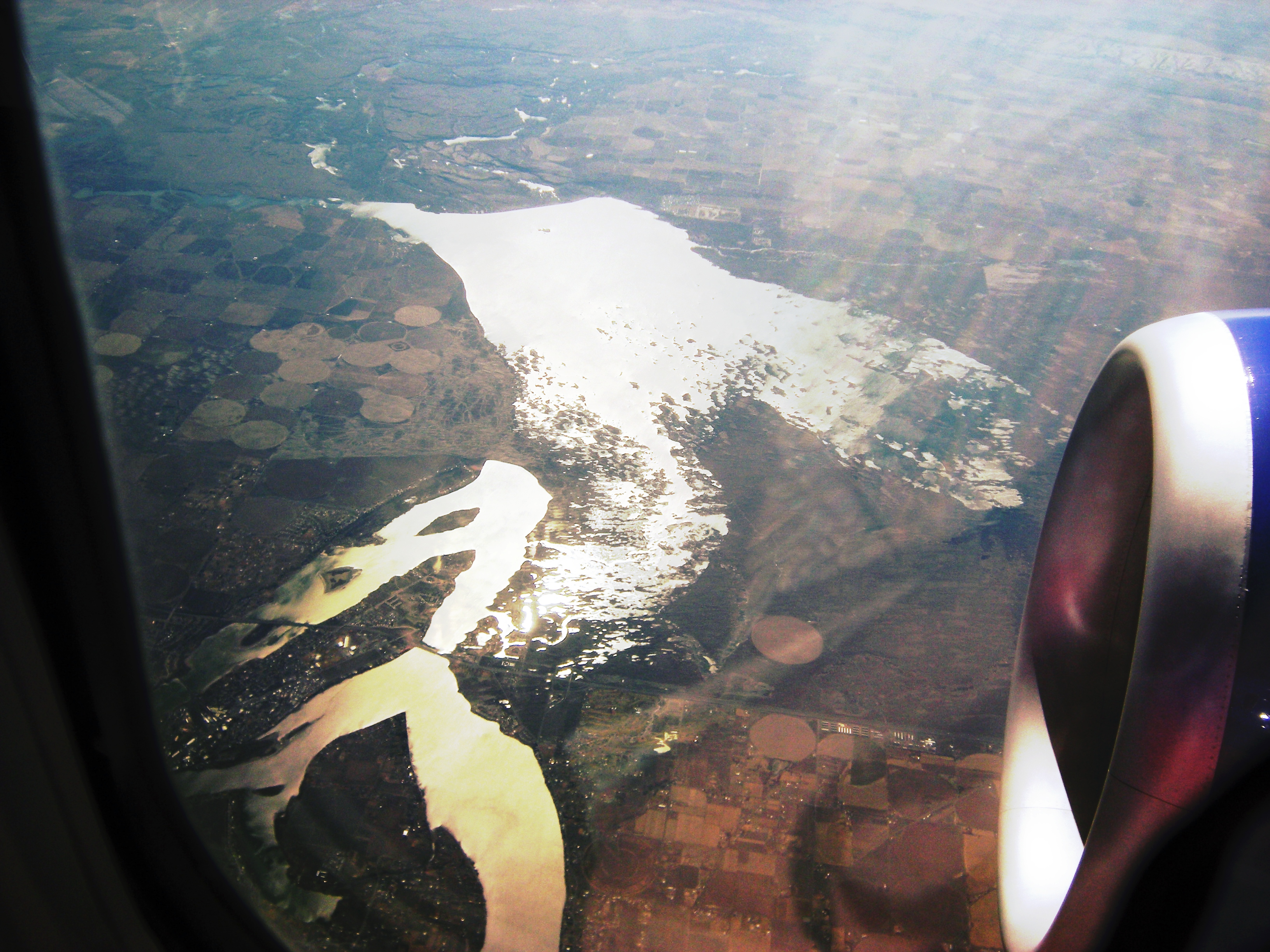
- Aerial view from the north (2009). Moses Lake is at lower left and the Potholes Reservoir at center.

- Location within Washington (state) Location within the United States
- Location: Grant County, Washington
- Coordinates: 47.0809°N 119.3254°W
- Type: natural lake, reservoir
- Primary inflows: Crab Creek; Rocky Ford Creek
- Primary outflows: Potholes Reservoir (to Lower Crab Creek)
- Basin countries: United States
- Surface area: 6,800 acres (28 km^{2})
- Average depth: 18 ft (5.5 m)
- Max. depth: 38 ft (12 m)
- Surface elevation: 1,046 ft (319 m)

Moses Lake is a lake and reservoir along the course of Crab Creek, in the U.S. state of Washington.

Moses Lake is part of the Columbia River basin, as Crab Creek is a tributary of the Columbia River.

Although originally a shallow natural lake, Moses Lake was dammed in the early 20th century for irrigation purposes. It then became part of the Columbia Basin Project, built and managed by the United States Bureau of Reclamation. Moses Lake receives water from Crab Creek, as well as from irrigated agricultural runoff. Its water used to flow out into Crab Creek, but now flows into Potholes Reservoir, a storage reservoir created by impounding Crab Creek at O'Sullivan Dam.

Moses Lake is fairly complex in shape, with several arms, called "horns". These horns include Lewis Horn, Parker Horn, and Pelican Horn. There are several islands in Moses Lake, including Crest Island, Marsh Island, Gaileys Island, and Goat Island.

Moses Lake was named after Chief Moses in the late 19th century. The city of Moses Lake was, in turn, named after the lake.

The city of Moses Lake was originally named Neppel, and was not changed to Moses Lake until 1938.

== History of Moses Lake ==
Moses lake was named after Chief Moses, head of a local tribe "variously called Kowalchina, The Sinkiuse, and The Colombias," who used the lakes resources since childhood. For centuries the lake was utilized by indigenous peoples to collect waterfowl's eggs, which were abundant on Moses Lake. They remained unbothered for quite some time by white settlers, because the land surrounding the lake was too dry for farming, however by the 1880's white settlement had grown enough to disrupt tribes and drive them away. In 1910 a small community that called themselves "Neppel" formed, development of the community progressed slowly, until they built a dam and began to pump irrigation from the lake. Irrigation kickstarted growth of the community, first watering "apple orchards, then potatoes, and later corn, onions, carrots, and sugar beets". Today the lake is still used for irrigation, as well as recreation.

== Fish in Moses Lake ==
Moses lake is home to various freshwater fish, provided by the Washington State Department of Fish and Wildlife to be: Black Crappie, Largemouth Bass, Smallmouth Bass, Walleye, Yellow Perch, Channel Catfish, Lake Whitefish, Common Carp, and Bluegill. The lake is especially abundant with Walleye, a fish often sought by fishers because they are known to be great for eating and have been recorded to often reach and exceed 10 pounds in Moses Lake. Additionally the lake offers year round fishing, and during the winter months when the lake freezes over ice fishing can be practiced. Although is it permitted to catch all fish year round, daily limits apply on amount and size of catch.

== See also ==
- List of lakes in Washington (state)
