= Columbia National Wildlife Refuge =

Wildlife refuge in Washington, U.S.

- IUCN category IV (habitat/species management area)
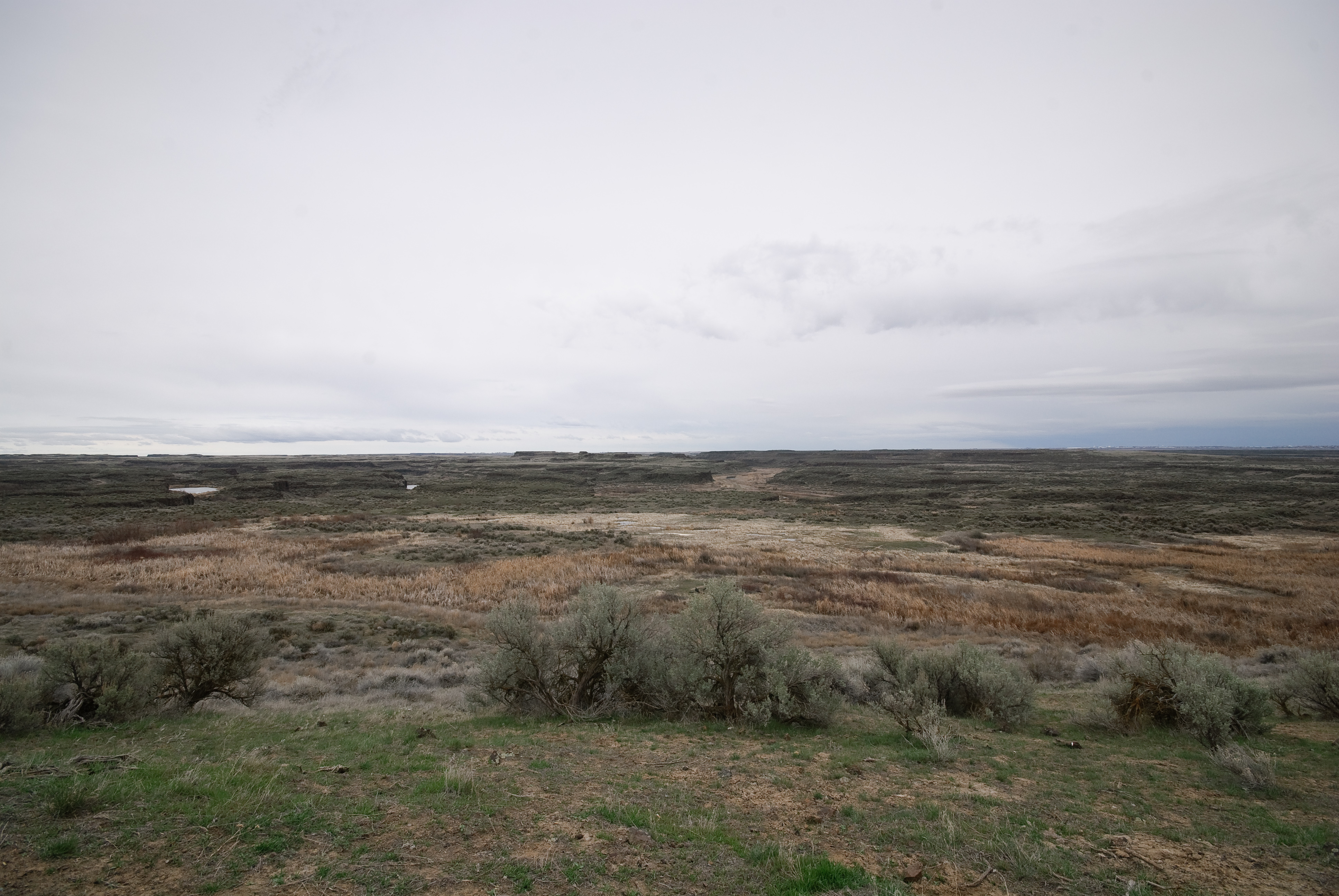
- Drumheller Channels National Natural Landmark overlook

- Location within Washington (state)
- Location: Grant and Adams counties, Washington
- Nearest city: Moses Lake
- Coordinates: 46.8512489°N 119.5366966°W
- Area: 29,596.27 acres (11,977.19 ha)
- Established: 1944
- Governing body: U.S. Fish and Wildlife Service
- Website: Columbia National Wildlife Refuge

Columbia National Wildlife Refuge is a scenic mixture of rugged cliffs, canyons, lakes, and sagebrush grasslands. Formed by fire, ice, floods, and volcanic tempest, carved by periods of extreme violence of natural forces, the refuge lies in the middle of the Drumheller Channeled Scablands of central Washington. The area reveals a rich geologic history highlighted by periods of dramatic activity, each playing a major role in shaping the land. The northern half of the refuge, south of Potholes Reservoir, is a rugged jumble of cliffs, canyons, lakes, and remnants of lava flows. This part of the Scablands, known as the Drumheller Channels, is the most spectacularly eroded area of its size in the world and was designated as a National Natural Landmark in 1986.

The favorable mixture of lakes and surrounding irrigated croplands, combined with generally mild winters and protection provided by the refuge, attracts large numbers of migrating and wintering mallard ducks, Canada geese, trumpeter swans and tundra swans.

Mammals species that inhabit this refuge include raccoon, mink, badger, elk, coyote, skunk, Canadian lynx, two species of deer, bobcat, beaver, porcupine, river otter, muskrat, and cougar.

== Activities ==
Hunting and particularly fishing are popular in the park. Hunting is only allowed at certain times on certain days and seasons and requires a permit.

== Climate and water ==
The refuge is located in the rainshadow of the Cascade Mountains, and the climate is arid and desert-like. The park receives less than eight inches of annual rainfall on average. The wildlife is supported by water routed from the Grand Coulee Dam, and the park is part of the Columbia Basin Project.
