= O'Sullivan Dam =

Coordinates: 46°58′57″N 119°17′28″W

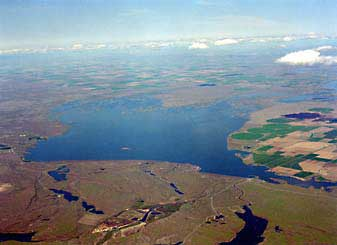
O'Sullivan Dam located near the bottom of Potholes Reservoir.

O'Sullivan Dam (National ID # WA00268), one of the largest earthfill dams in the United States (200 ft/61 m high; 19,000 ft/5,791 m long; completed 1949), is on Crab Creek in the U.S. state of Washington, about 45 km south of Ephrata and 25 km south of Moses Lake.

The 27,800-acre (113 km^{2}) Potholes Reservoir formed by this dam collects return flows from all irrigation in the upper portion of the project for reuse in the southern portion. A system of wasteways has been built on both the West and East Low Canals to provide operational safety for the canals and a means of delivering water into Potholes Reservoir to supplement the natural and return flows.

The dam was built as part of the Columbia Basin Project.

== Statistics ==
- Active storage capacity: 332,200 acre-feet (409,800,000 m^{3})
- Structural height of dam: 200.0 ft (60 m)
- Construction date: 1947-1949
- Normal water surface elevation: 1052.0 ft (320.6 m)
- Drainage area: 3,920.0 sq mi (10,153 km²)
- Storm duration: 72 hr

== See also ==
- Columbia Basin Project
