= Sentinel Gap =

Water gap in Washington, United States

Coordinates: 46°48′19″N 119°56′02″W

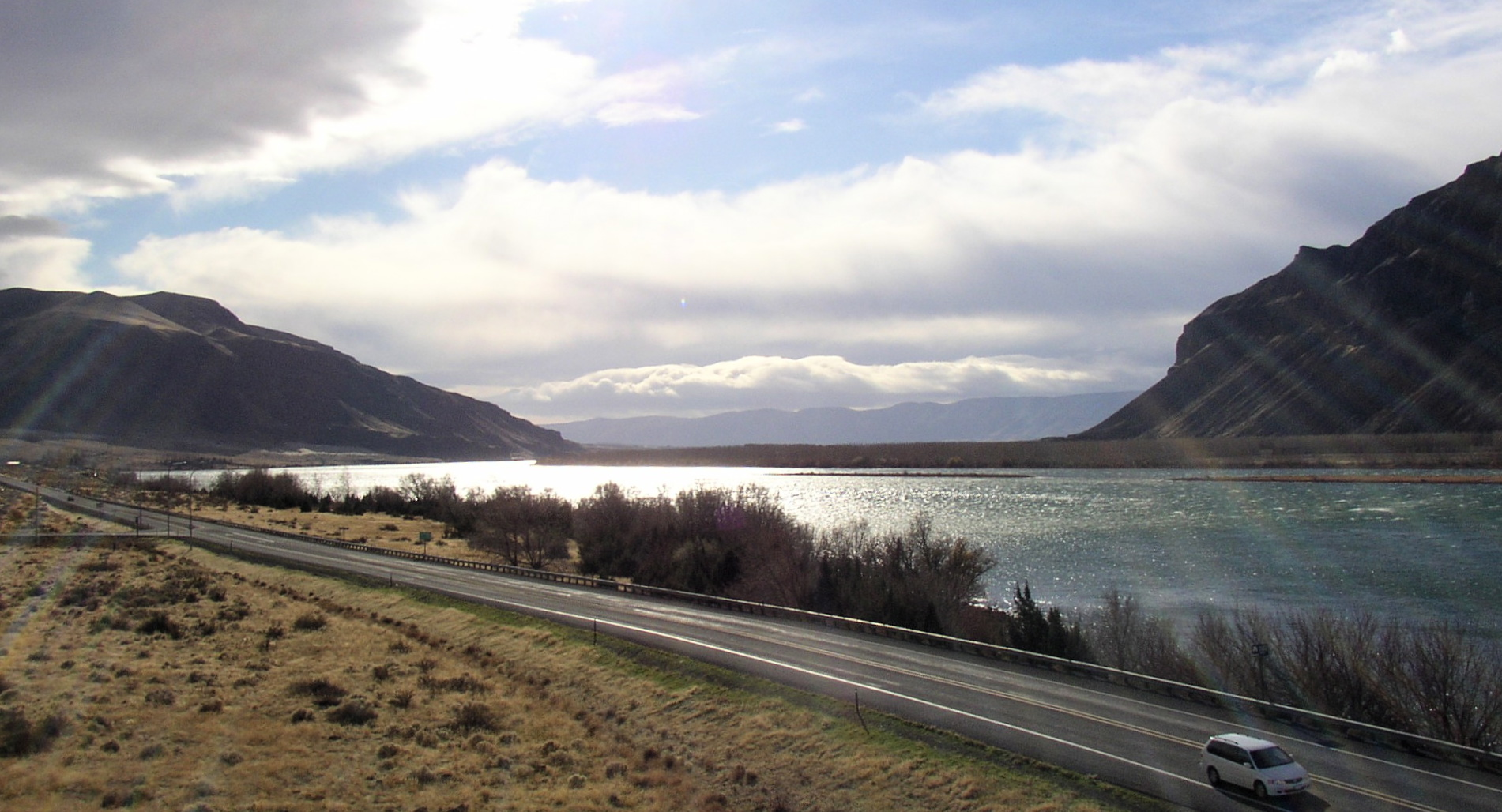
Sentinel Gap

Sentinel Gap Ice Age floods features

Sentinel Gap is a water gap formed by the Columbia River in the Saddle Mountains, near Mattawa in Washington state. The gap is "a water gap where erosion by the Columbia River was able to keep pace with folding, faulting and uplifting across the Saddle Mountain anticline". During Ice Age floods in which waters from the Channeled Scablands found passage to the Pacific Ocean here and at Wallula Gap, this opening was "repeatedly reamed out, which probably widened and steepened the walls of the gap". Strandlines from the floods can be seen on the basalt walls of the gap.

SR 243 runs along the east side of the river through the gap, and the river is spanned by the Beverly Railroad Bridge. The gap is located between the Wanapum and Priest Rapids dams. Priest Rapids, for which the dam was named, are now submerged beneath the dam's reservoir about 4 miles (6.4 km) downstream from Sentinel Gap.

== Sources ==
- Bjornstad, Bruce N. (2006), On the Trail of the Ice Age Floods: A Geological Field Guide to the Mid-Columbia Basin, Keokee Books, ISBN 9781879628274, OCLC 70697754
- Soehnichsen, John (2012), Washington's Channeled Scablands Guide, The Mountaineers Books, ISBN 978-1-59485-483-5, OCLC 910880058
