= Potholes Reservoir =

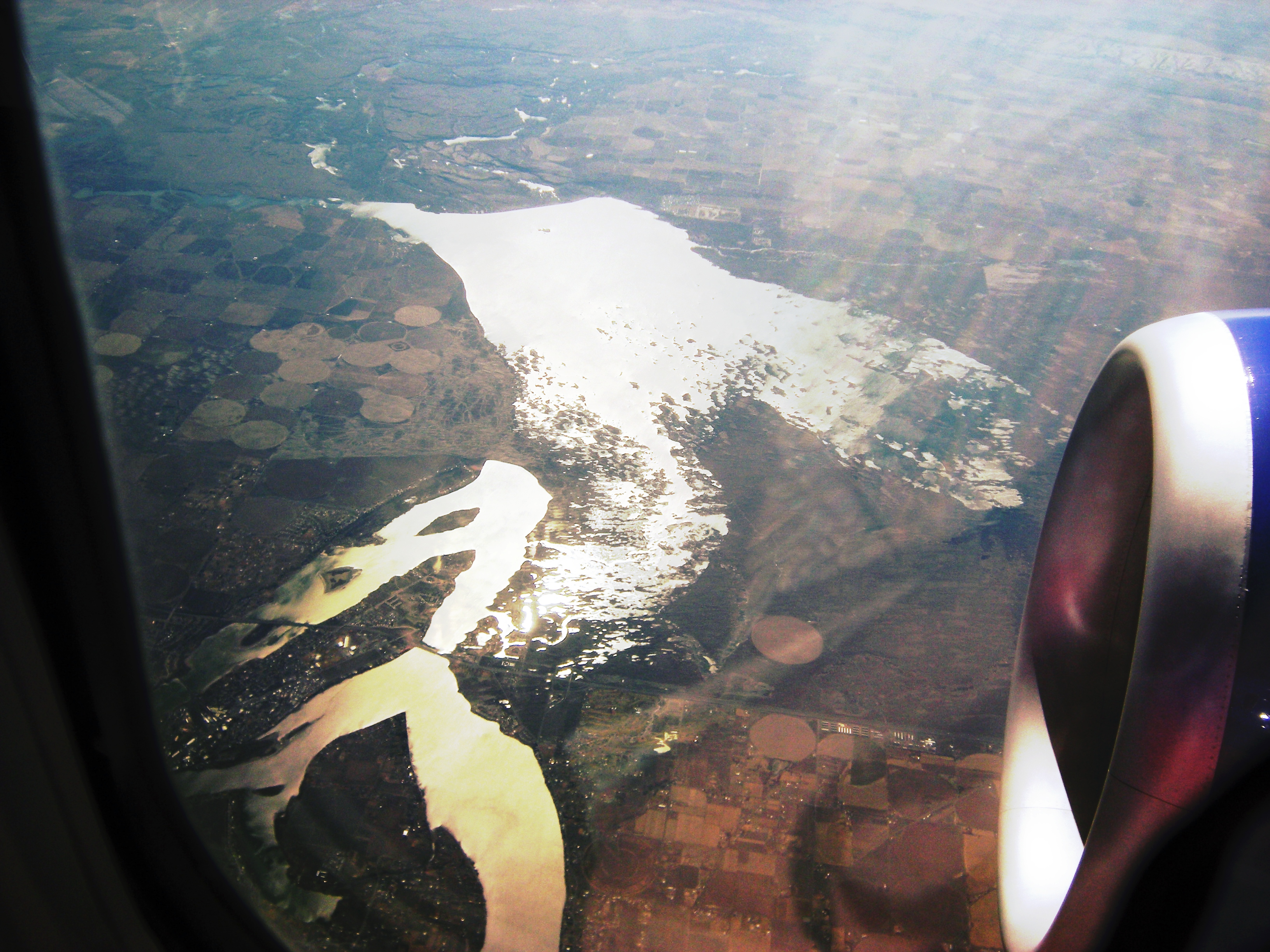
- Aerial view from the north (2009). Moses Lake is at lower left and the Potholes Reservoir at center.

- Location within Washington (state) Location within the United States
- Location: Grant County, Washington, United States
- Coordinates: 46°58′57″N 119°17′28″W
- Lake type: Reservoir
- Basin countries: United States
- Average depth: 18 feet (5.5 m)
- Max. depth: 142 feet (43 m)
- Surface elevation: 1,043 feet (318 m)

The Potholes Reservoir is part of the Columbia Basin Irrigation Project. It is formed by the O'Sullivan Dam and located in central Washington, in the United States. The reservoir is fed by water from Moses Lake, part of the Crab Creek basin.

The area features several lakes (typically 30-70 yards wide and 10–30 feet deep). These lakes, known as "potholes" were created through both natural and man made processes. The potholes were initially carved out during the Pleistocene by flood waters originating from Glacial Lake Missoula. Subsequent damming of the area by the Columbia Basin Project raised the water table high enough to allow these topographical depressions to become lakes. The formation of the pothole lakes also allowed the creation of thousands of micro-islands as the lakes wrap around the dunes, forming islands. They are home to willow trees and cattails due to their boggy-like state.

== Recreation ==
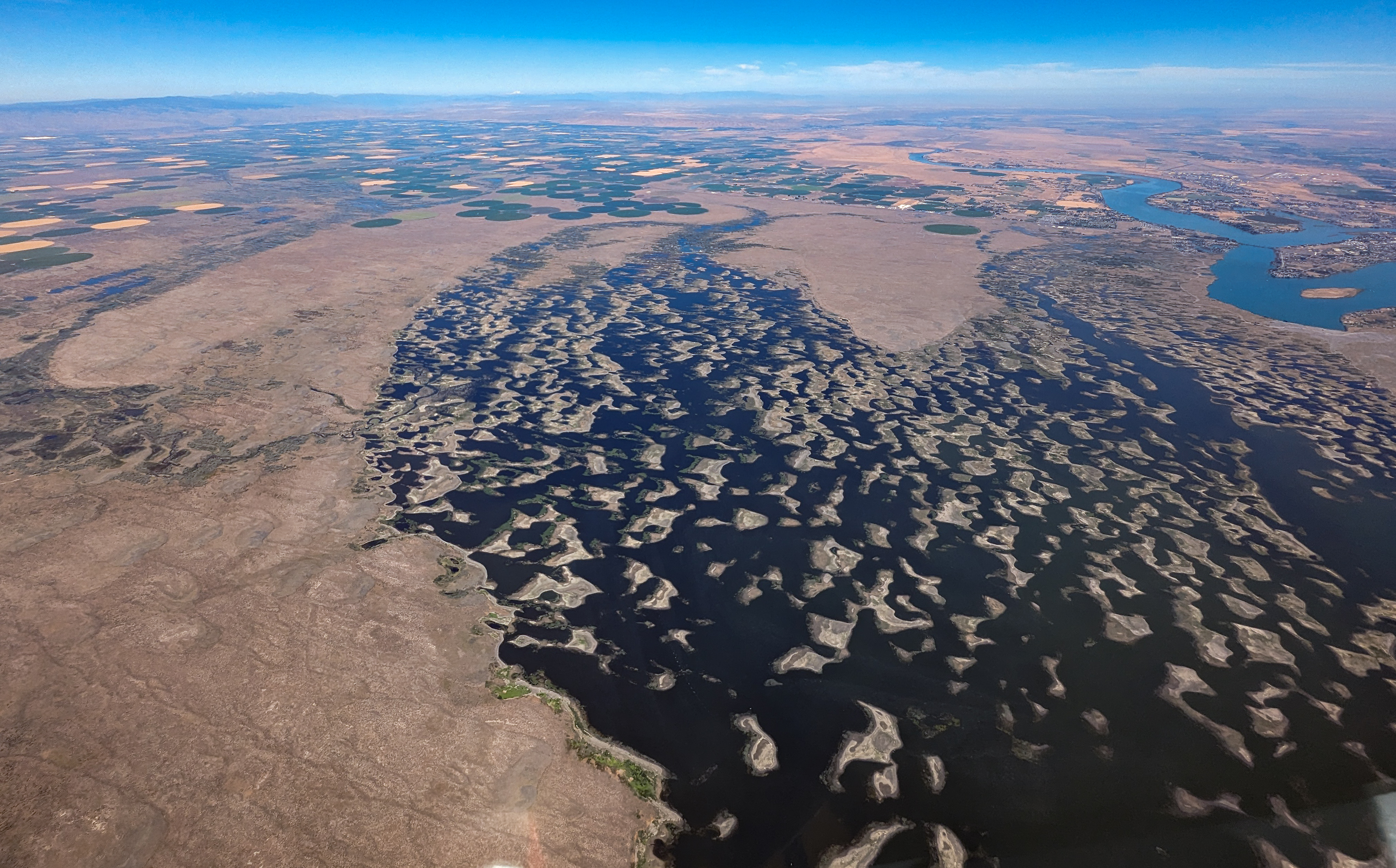
Potholes Reservoir, looking north

On the shore of the reservoir is Potholes State Park, a 640-acre (2.6 km^{2}) member of the Washington State Park System. It has 6,000 feet (1,800 m) of shoreline on the reservoir.

== Fishing ==
There are many types of fish inside of the reservoir, including:

- Largemouth bass
- Smallmouth bass
- Rainbow trout
- Walleye
- Black crappie
- Yellow perch
- Bluegill
- Lake whitefish
- Carp
- Steelhead
