= Othello, Washington =

City in Washington, United States

Othello
- City
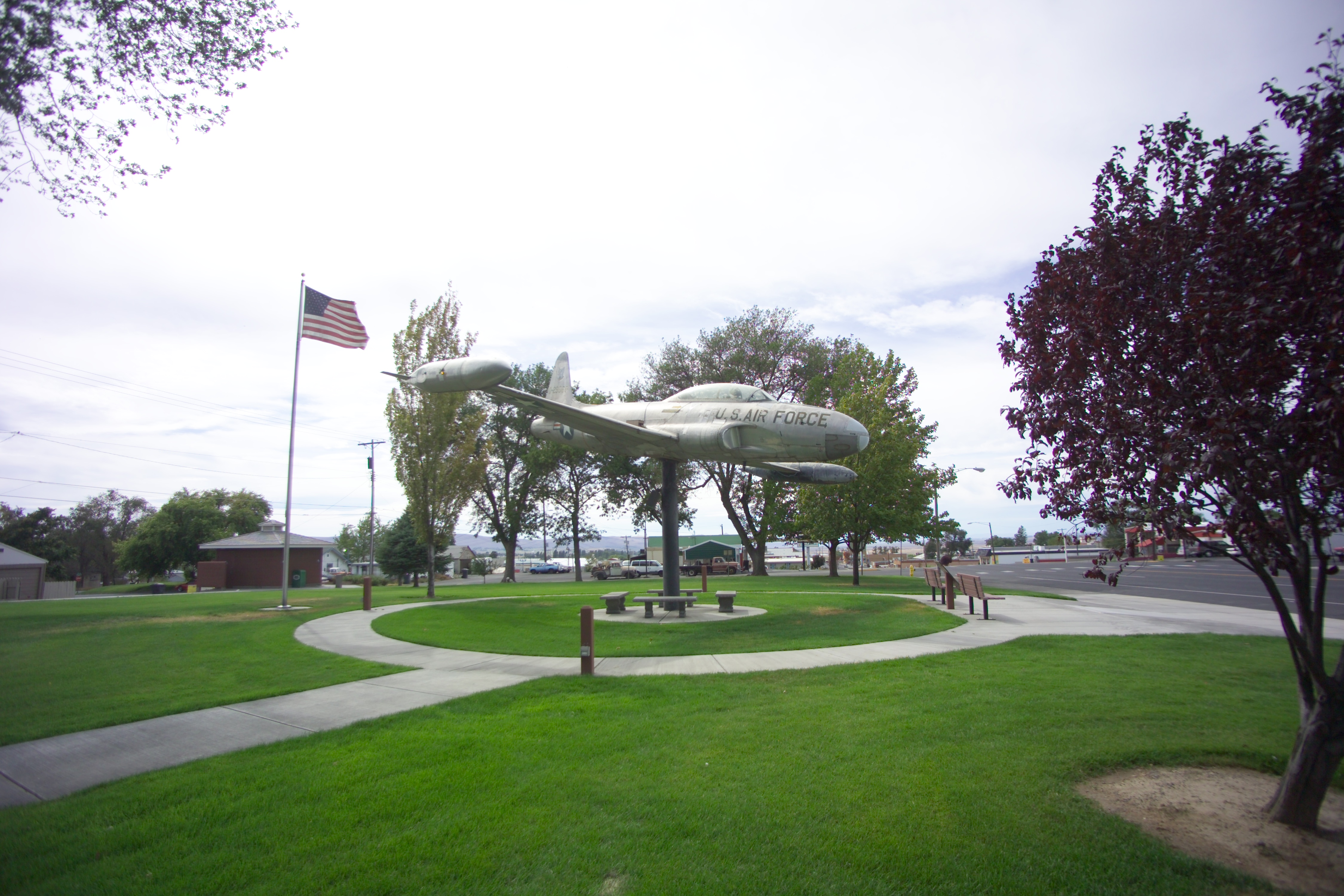
- T-33 jet in Pioneer Park

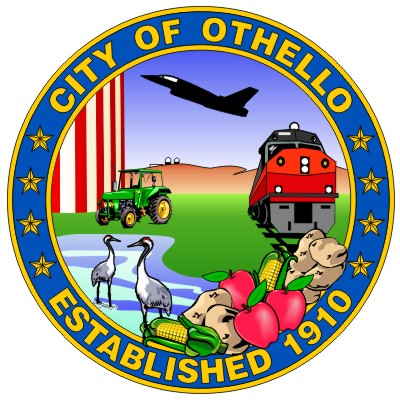
- Seal

- Location of Othello, Washington
- Coordinates: 46°49′20″N 119°09′55″W
- Country: United States
- State: Washington
- County: Adams

Government
  - Type: Mayor–council
  - Mayor: Ken Johnson

Area
  - Total: 3.98 sq mi (10.31 km^{2})
  - Land: 3.98 sq mi (10.31 km^{2})
  - Water: 0 sq mi (0.00 km^{2})
- Elevation: 1,089 ft (332 m)

Population (2020)
  - Total: 8,549
  - Density: 2,148/sq mi (829.2/km^{2})
- Time zone: UTC-8 (Pacific (PST))
  - Summer (DST): UTC-7 (PDT)
- ZIP codes: 99327, 99332, 99344
- Area code: 509
- FIPS code: 53-52215
- GNIS feature ID: 2411341
- Website: othellowa.gov

Othello (/oʊˈθɛloʊ/) is a city in Adams County, Washington, United States. The population was 8,549 at the 2020 census, a 16 percent increase from 2010. It is located in the heart of the Columbia Basin Project, approximately 100 miles (160 km) southwest of Spokane. The city is 25 miles (40 km) south of Interstate 90 in Moses Lake and is connected by State Route 17 and State Route 26.

== History ==
The first white settlers in the area were two brothers, Ben and Sam Hutchinson, who built a cabin along the Crab Creek in 1884. An influx of homesteaders began after the start of the 20th century, and a post office was established in 1904. The post office was named Othello in a public contest after a post office also called Othello in Roane County, Tennessee.

The Chicago, Milwaukee, & St. Paul Railroad ran a track through Adams County in 1907. In 1912, a hotel was built for the railroad workers. That hotel would be later known as the Old Hotel and Art Gallery. The railroad officially platted the town as a stop, with water to feed the boilers of steam trains. They kept the name Othello and built a railyard and wooden roundhouse there. Although the roundhouse burned in 1919, it was replaced with a brick structure that lasted many years. Businesses and settlers continued to follow, and the town was incorporated on May 31, 1910. At the time the railroad was the eastern terminus of the second electrified district of the Milwaukee Road's "Pacific Extension" route, which extended up to Tacoma, Washington. The railroad was abandoned in 1980 following the Milwaukee Road's bankruptcy.

The Bureau of Reclamation located offices in Othello in 1947, which prevented the decline of this town with the decline of rail shipping after World War II. In the early 1950s, the Columbia Basin Project brought irrigation to the Othello area, increasing both agriculture and commerce. Prior to this, water came only from Crab Creek and from local wells. The water arrived via the Potholes East Canal between Billy Clapp Lake and Scootenay Reservoir in Franklin County. Once there was irrigation available, a land drawing was held in Othello. On May 31, 1952, 42 names were drawn (of more than 7000 submitted) for the privilege of purchasing this newly desirable acreage.

From 1951 to 1973, the 637th Radar Squadron operated the Othello Radar Station near the town. In 1958, an ice plant was opened in town to service railroad cars moving produce. Frozen food packaging came to town in the early 1960s, and has since become the main industry.

Since 1998, Othello has also been home to the Sandhill Crane Festival, celebrating the annual arrival of sandhill cranes to the nearby Columbia National Wildlife Refuge.

== Geography ==
According to the United States Census Bureau, the city has a total area of 3.81 square miles (9.87 km^{2}), all of it land.

=== Climate ===
According to the Köppen Climate Classification system, Othello has a semi-arid climate, abbreviated "BSk" on climate maps.

Climate data for Othello, Washington
Month	Jan	Feb	Mar	Apr	May	Jun	Jul	Aug	Sep	Oct	Nov	Dec	Year
Record high °F (°C)	64 (18)	67 (19)	79 (26)	91 (33)	99 (37)	106 (41)	111 (44)	114 (46)	102 (39)	91 (33)	73 (23)	63 (17)	114 (46)
Mean daily maximum °F (°C)	35 (2)	43 (6)	53 (12)	61 (16)	69 (21)	76 (24)	83 (28)	83 (28)	74 (23)	61 (16)	45 (7)	35 (2)	60 (15)
Mean daily minimum °F (°C)	23 (−5)	28 (−2)	31 (−1)	36 (2)	43 (6)	49 (9)	54 (12)	54 (12)	47 (8)	37 (3)	31 (−1)	24 (−4)	38 (3)
Record low °F (°C)	−26 (−32)	−26 (−32)	6 (−14)	16 (−9)	23 (−5)	31 (−1)	34 (1)	36 (2)	26 (−3)	14 (−10)	−14 (−26)	−15 (−26)	−26 (−32)
Average precipitation inches (mm)	0.93 (24)	0.85 (22)	0.86 (22)	0.62 (16)	0.73 (19)	0.52 (13)	0.39 (9.9)	0.33 (8.4)	0.40 (10)	0.57 (14)	1.04 (26)	1.21 (31)	8.45 (215.3)

== Economy ==
In addition to agricultural output, Othello has several food processing and cold storage companies, especially for potatoes. The local area processes approximately 1.5 billion pounds (680 kt) of frozen potato products annually, comprising 15 percent of production in North America. More than 700 jobs in Othello are tied to potato processing, including at McCain Foods and J. R. Simplot facilities. The agricultural economy is threatened by an increasing shortage of water.

== Demographics ==
Historical population
Census	Pop.	Note	%±
1920	649		—
1930	397		−38.8%
1940	332		−16.4%
1950	526		58.4%
1960	2,669		407.4%
1970	4,122		54.4%
1980	4,454		8.1%
1990	4,638		4.1%
2000	5,847		26.1%
2010	7,364		25.9%
2020	8,549		16.1%
U.S. Decennial Census

Since the 1980s, Othello has become a destination for immigrants from Latin America who arrive as migrant workers or for seasonal farm jobs.

=== 2020 census ===
As of the 2020 census, Othello had a population of 8,549. The median age was 26.7 years. 36.4% of residents were under the age of 18 and 8.8% of residents were 65 years of age or older. For every 100 females there were 100.9 males, and for every 100 females age 18 and over there were 95.5 males age 18 and over.

98.8% of residents lived in urban areas, while 1.2% lived in rural areas.

There were 2,519 households in Othello, of which 54.3% had children under the age of 18 living in them. Of all households, 50.1% were married-couple households, 16.0% were households with a male householder and no spouse or partner present, and 26.1% were households with a female householder and no spouse or partner present. About 14.8% of all households were made up of individuals and 6.5% had someone living alone who was 65 years of age or older.

There were 2,616 housing units, of which 3.7% were vacant. The homeowner vacancy rate was 0.5% and the rental vacancy rate was 3.5%.

Racial composition as of the 2020 census
Race	Number	Percent
White	2,810	32.9%
Black or African American	26	0.3%
American Indian and Alaska Native	147	1.7%
Asian	96	1.1%
Native Hawaiian and Other Pacific Islander	9	0.1%
Some other race	3,335	39.0%
Two or more races	2,126	24.9%
Hispanic or Latino (of any race)	6,812	79.7%

The ancestry of the city was 5.9% German, 4.0% English, 3.4% Irish, 2.3% Italian, 0.9% Norwegian, 0.4% Dutch, and 0.4% Ukrainian.

The median household income was $58,450, with families having $59,569, married couples having $76,655, and non-families had $23,112. 21.8% of the population were in poverty. The per capita income was $21,581.

=== 2010 census ===
As of the 2010 census, there were 7,364 people, 2,108 households, and 1,669 families residing in the city. The population density was 1,932.8 inhabitants per square mile (746.3/km^{2}). There were 2,185 housing units at an average density of 573.5 per square mile (221.4/km^{2}). The racial makeup of the city was 53.4% White, 0.5% African American, 2.2% Native American, 1.2% Asian, 39.6% from other races, and 3.2% from two or more races. Hispanic or Latino of any race were 74.7% of the population.

There were 2,108 households, of which 57.8% had children under the age of 18 living with them, 56.5% were married couples living together, 15.8% had a female householder with no husband present, 6.8% had a male householder with no wife present, and 20.8% were non-families. 17.1% of all households were made up of individuals, and 7.6% had someone living alone who was 65 years of age or older. The average household size was 3.46 and the average family size was 3.91.

The median age in the city was 25.6 years. 37.9% of residents were under the age of 18; 11.1% were between the ages of 18 and 24; 27.2% were from 25 to 44; 15.6% were from 45 to 64; and 8.1% were 65 years of age or older. The gender makeup of the city was 50.4% male and 49.6% female.

=== 2000 census ===
As of the 2000 census, there were 5,847 people, 1,788 households, and 1,412 families residing in the city. The population density was 1,949.7 people per square mile (752.5/km^{2}). There were 1,864 housing units at an average density of 621.6 per square mile (239.9/km^{2}). The racial makeup of the city was 54.18% White, 0.53% African American, 1.01% Native American, 1.01% Asian, 0.09% Pacific Islander, 39.54% from other races, and 3.64% from two or more races. Hispanic or Latino of any race were 63.76% of the population.

There were 1,788 households, out of which 48.8% had children under the age of 18 living with them, 60.6% were married couples living together, 13.5% had a female householder with no husband present, and 21.0% were non-families. 17.4% of all households were made up of individuals, and 7.2% had someone living alone who was 65 years of age or older. The average household size was 3.24 and the average family size was 3.66.

In the city, the age distribution of the population shows 36.1% under the age of 18, 12.0% from 18 to 24, 26.3% from 25 to 44, 17.1% from 45 to 64, and 8.6% who were 65 years of age or older. The median age was 26 years. For every 100 females, there were 103.3 males. For every 100 females age 18 and over, there were 100.7 males.

The median income for a household in the city was $30,291, and the median income for a family was $31,282. Males had a median income of $28,423 versus $21,455 for females. The per capita income for the city was $11,409. About 18.4% of families and 24.0% of the population were below the poverty line, including 33.5% of those under age 18 and 5.3% of those age 65 or over.

== Newspaper ==
- Othello Outlook (1947–2016)

== Sister city ==
Othello has the following sister city relationship:

- Wulensi, Nanumba South District, Ghana.

== Notable people ==
- Stephen Beus, pianist
- Bill Crow, jazz musician/author
- Brianne Drouhard, animator
- Davey Richards, professional wrestler
- Pee Wee (born Irvin Salinas), singer
- Jim Sandusky, football player
