= Electric City, Washington =

Electric City
- City
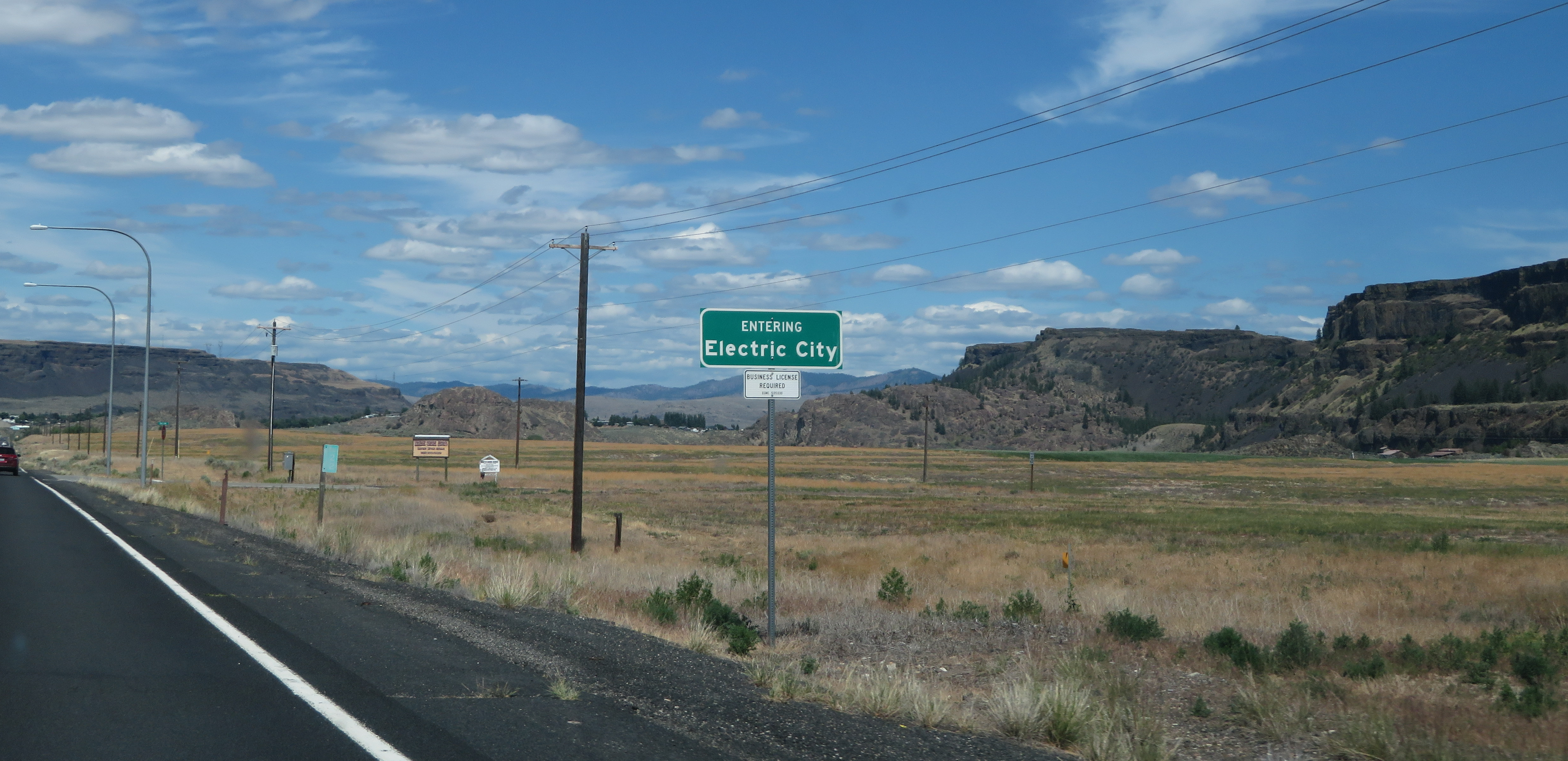
- Sign for Electric City on Washington State Route 155

- Location of Electric City, Washington
- Coordinates: 47°55′18″N 119°02′51″W
- Country: United States
- State: Washington
- County: Grant

Government
  - Type: Mayor–council
  - Mayor: Diane Kohout

Area
  - Total: 2.64 sq mi (6.84 km^{2})
  - Land: 1.99 sq mi (5.15 km^{2})
  - Water: 0.65 sq mi (1.69 km^{2})
- Elevation: 1,575 ft (480 m)

Population (2020)
  - Total: 956
  - Density: 504/sq mi (194.6/km^{2})
- Time zone: UTC-8 (Pacific (PST))
  - Summer (DST): UTC-7 (PDT)
- ZIP code: 99123
- Area code: 509
- FIPS code: 53-21030
- GNIS feature ID: 2412472
- Website: electriccity.us

Electric City is a city in Grant County, Washington. The population was 956 at the time of the 2020 census. The community was named for its proximity to the power source at Grand Coulee Dam.

== History ==
Electric City was established in 1934 as one of several settlements around the future site of the Grand Coulee Dam that aimed to house construction workers. President Franklin D. Roosevelt stopped at Electric City during his tour of the dam site later that year; by August, 500 lots had been platted for the town. Some of the earliest buildings in Electric City had been relocated from nearby Osborne, which was inundated by Franklin D. Roosevelt Lake following the dam's completion. A post office was created for the settlement in June 1935 and was followed by a school a year later.

Electric City was incorporated as a fourth-class city on August 4, 1950, following a vote on July 8. The 1950 U.S. census counted a population of 1,472 people in the Electric City area a few months before the election. A group of residents contested the validity of the incorporation and appealed to the Grant County's superior court, which did not overturn the incorporation.

== Geography ==
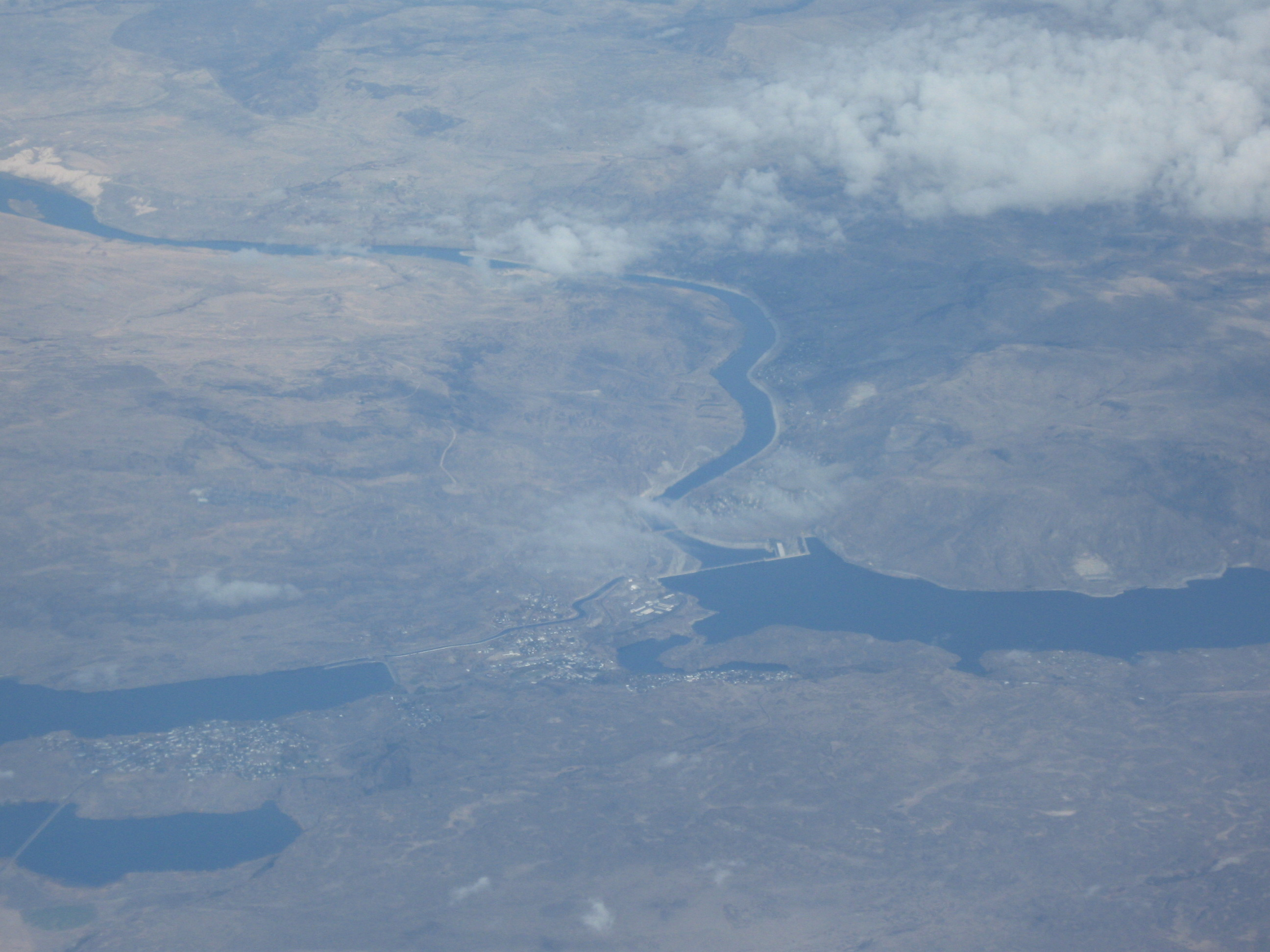
Overview of Franklin Delano Roosevelt Lake from the south looking downstream toward Grand Coulee Dam. Grand Coulee and Electric City to the west.

Electric City is located near the northern end of the Grand Coulee (now filled by Banks Lake) in northern Grant County, Washington. It is southwest of the Grand Coulee Dam and the city of Grand Coulee, and connected to both by State Route 155.

According to the United States Census Bureau, the city has a total area of 2.34 square miles (6.06 km^{2}), of which, 1.70 square miles (4.40 km^{2}) is land and 0.64 square miles (1.66 km^{2}) is water.

== Climate ==
Climate data for Electric City, Washington
Month	Jan	Feb	Mar	Apr	May	Jun	Jul	Aug	Sep	Oct	Nov	Dec	Year
Record high °F (°C)	61 (16)	61 (16)	73 (23)	91 (33)	100 (38)	102 (39)	108 (42)	110 (43)	103 (39)	84 (29)	69 (21)	58 (14)	110 (43)
Mean daily maximum °F (°C)	33 (1)	40 (4)	52 (11)	61 (16)	70 (21)	78 (26)	87 (31)	87 (31)	77 (25)	61 (16)	43 (6)	32 (0)	60 (16)
Mean daily minimum °F (°C)	23 (−5)	25 (−4)	31 (−1)	37 (3)	45 (7)	51 (11)	58 (14)	57 (14)	49 (9)	39 (4)	30 (−1)	22 (−6)	39 (4)
Record low °F (°C)	−17 (−27)	−15 (−26)	—	21 (−6)	21 (−6)	36 (2)	40 (4)	38 (3)	30 (−1)	7 (−14)	−10 (−23)	−16 (−27)	−17 (−27)
Average precipitation inches (mm)	1.06 (27)	1.00 (25)	0.91 (23)	0.87 (22)	1.15 (29)	1.05 (27)	0.64 (16)	0.28 (7.1)	0.44 (11)	0.68 (17)	1.30 (33)	1.45 (37)	10.83 (274.1)

== Demographics ==
Historical population
Census	Pop.	Note	%±
1960	404		—
1970	651		61.1%
1980	927		42.4%
1990	910		−1.8%
2000	922		1.3%
2010	968		5.0%
2020	956		−1.2%
U.S. Decennial Census; 2020 Census

=== 2020 census ===
As of the 2020 census, Electric City had a population of 956. The median age was 51.6 years. 17.6% of residents were under the age of 18 and 28.5% of residents were 65 years of age or older. For every 100 females there were 106.5 males, and for every 100 females age 18 and over there were 102.1 males age 18 and over.

0.0% of residents lived in urban areas, while 100.0% lived in rural areas.

There were 427 households in Electric City, of which 23.2% had children under the age of 18 living in them. Of all households, 51.8% were married-couple households, 21.5% were households with a male householder and no spouse or partner present, and 19.0% were households with a female householder and no spouse or partner present. About 28.5% of all households were made up of individuals and 14.7% had someone living alone who was 65 years of age or older.

There were 487 housing units, of which 12.3% were vacant. The homeowner vacancy rate was 0.6% and the rental vacancy rate was 7.5%.

Racial composition as of the 2020 census
Race	Number	Percent
White	725	75.8%
Black or African American	1	0.1%
American Indian and Alaska Native	116	12.1%
Asian	4	0.4%
Native Hawaiian and Other Pacific Islander	2	0.2%
Some other race	17	1.8%
Two or more races	91	9.5%
Hispanic or Latino (of any race)	58	6.1%

=== 2010 census ===
As of the 2010 census, there were 968 people, 447 households, and 275 families residing in the city. The population density was 569.4 inhabitants per square mile (219.8/km^{2}). There were 524 housing units at an average density of 308.2 per square mile (119.0/km^{2}). The racial makeup of the city was 86.0% White, 0.5% African American, 5.2% Native American, 0.4% Asian, 0.9% from other races, and 7.0% from two or more races. Hispanic or Latino of any race were 4.0% of the population.

There were 447 households, of which 21.3% had children under the age of 18 living with them, 50.1% were married couples living together, 8.9% had a female householder with no husband present, 2.5% had a male householder with no wife present, and 38.5% were non-families. 33.3% of all households were made up of individuals, and 13.6% had someone living alone who was 65 years of age or older. The average household size was 2.17 and the average family size was 2.71.

The median age in the city was 50.5 years. 18.3% of residents were under the age of 18; 5% were between the ages of 18 and 24; 18.1% were from 25 to 44; 36.4% were from 45 to 64; and 22.2% were 65 years of age or older. The gender makeup of the city was 49.7% male and 50.3% female.

=== 2000 census ===
As of the 2000 census, there were 922 people, 382 households, and 291 families residing in the city. The population density was 1,706.3 people per square mile (659.2/km^{2}). There were 420 housing units at an average density of 777.3 per square mile (300.3/km^{2}). The racial makeup of the city was 89.59% White, 0.22% African American, 7.05% Native American, 0.65% Asian, 0.11% Pacific Islander, 0.11% from other races, and 2.28% from two or more races. Hispanic or Latino of any race were 1.84% of the population.

There were 382 households, out of which 27.0% had children under the age of 18 living with them, 63.6% were married couples living together, 8.1% had a female householder with no husband present, and 23.8% were non-families. 20.2% of all households were made up of individuals, and 7.3% had someone living alone who was 65 years of age or older. The average household size was 2.41 and the average family size was 2.74.

In the city, the age distribution of the population shows 23.1% under the age of 18, 6.1% from 18 to 24, 18.4% from 25 to 44, 33.9% from 45 to 64, and 18.4% who were 65 years of age or older. The median age was 46 years. For every 100 females, there were 92.9 males. For every 100 females age 18 and over, there were 95.3 males.

The median income for a household in the city was $42,321, and the median income for a family was $47,969. Males had a median income of $46,667 versus $20,288 for females. The per capita income for the city was $19,388. About 11.6% of families and 12.4% of the population were below the poverty line, including 18.0% of those under age 18 and 9.5% of those age 65 or over.

== Education ==
The city is served by the Grand Coulee Dam School District.

== Notable people ==
- Dennis Oppenheim, artist
