= Disautel, Washington =

- Census-designated place
- Location within Washington (state)
- Coordinates: 48°21′12″N 119°14′24″W
- Country: United States
- State: Washington
- County: Okanogan
- Established: 1919
- Elevation: 2,871 ft (875 m)
- Time zone: UTC-8 (Pacific (PST))
  - Summer (DST): UTC-7 (PDT)
- GNIS feature IDs: 2584967

Disautel is a census-designated place (CDP) in Okanogan County, Washington, United States, within the Greater Omak Area. As of the 2020 census, Disautel had a population of 47.

Established in 1919, the community is located approximately 15 miles (24 km) east of Omak, along what is now Washington State Route 155. It was formerly a logging town that was home to the headquarters of the Biles-Coleman Logging Company. When the highway to Nespelem Community was improved, workers in the sawmill began commuting from Omak, and the town population began to dwindle. After the sawmill closed at the beginning of the Great Depression, the town shrank further. For some time, the Highway Department used the empty warehouses in the town to store road working equipment, but that ultimately did not last, and the town was abandoned.

== Education ==
The area is served by the Omak School District.

== Demographics ==
Historical population
Census	Pop.	Note	%±
2010	78		—
2020	47		−39.7%
U.S. Decennial Census; 1970 1980 1990; 2000 2010

Disautel first appeared as a census designated place in the 2010 U.S. census.

=== Racial and ethnic composition ===
Disautel CDP, Washington – Racial and ethnic composition Note: the US Census treats Hispanic/Latino as an ethnic category. This table excludes Latinos from the racial categories and assigns them to a separate category. Hispanics/Latinos may be of any race.
Race / Ethnicity (NH = Non-Hispanic)	Pop 2010	Pop 2020	% 2010	% 2020
White alone (NH)	8	9	10.26%	19.15%
Black or African American alone (NH)	0	0	0.00%	0.00%
Native American or Alaska Native alone (NH)	65	37	83.33%	78.72%
Asian alone (NH)	0	0	0.00%	0.00%
Native Hawaiian or Pacific Islander alone (NH)	0	0	0.00%	0.00%
Other race alone (NH)	0	0	0.00%	0.00%
Mixed race or Multiracial (NH)	4	1	5.13%	2.13%
Hispanic or Latino (any race)	1	0	1.28%	0.00%
Total	78	47	100.00%	100.00%

== See also ==
- Disautel Pass
