= Foster Coulee =

Coulee in Douglas County, Washington

Coordinates: 47°52′51″N 119°14′19″W

Foster Coulee is a coulee in Douglas County, Washington. Like the larger Moses Coulee nearby, it was formed during the Missoula Floods at the end of the last ice age, some 14,000 years ago.

Washington State Route 17 between Bridgeport, Washington and Coulee City, Washington follows East Foster Creek along much of the coulee's valley floor. East Foster Creek now flows east to west through Foster Coulee.

The United States Geological Survey quadrangle map "Foster Coulee" is named for this prominent feature.

== Creation of the coulee ==
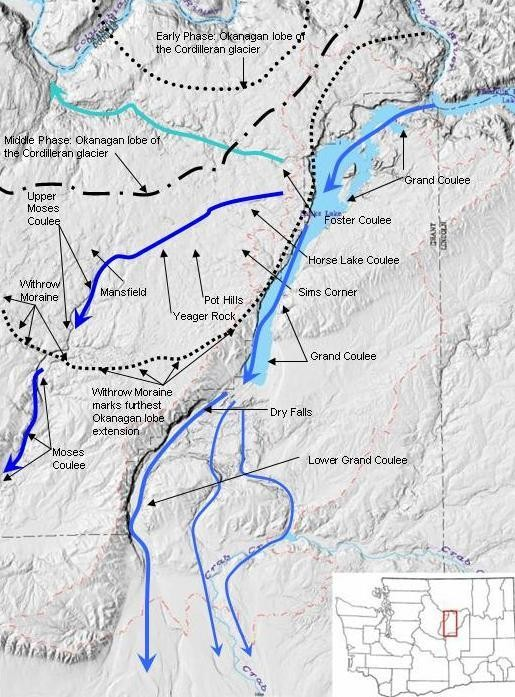
Foster Coulee vicinity showing ice age floods (blue lines)

Foster Coulee was formed during the Missoula Floods.

The Okanogan lobe of the Cordilleran Glacier moved down the Okanogan River valley and blocked the ancient route of the Columbia River, backing up water to create Glacial Lake Columbia. Initially, floodwater discharged from Glacial Lake Columbia by running up through the head of Grand Coulee and down through Foster Coulee to rejoin the Columbia River. After the floods, meltwater from the glacier reversed course and flowed east through the coulee, forming a hanging valley above the west rim of Grand Coulee and a debris fan on the Grand Coulee floor that can be seen today. As the glacier moved further south, Foster Coulee was cut off and the Columbia River then discharged through Moses Coulee.

== Proposed reservoir ==
Foster Coulee has been studied as a potential pumped-storage hydroelectricity site. The coulee would be dammed and approximately 500 MW generation capacity installed, exploiting the c. 500-foot (150 m) difference in elevation between the new reservoir and the existing Banks Lake. Banks Lake is in turn created by pumping water 280 feet (85 m) uphill from the Columbia River at the Grand Coulee Dam.

== Notable wildlife ==
The Washington ground squirrel, a candidate for U.S. Endangered Species Act listing, inhabits Foster Coulee.
