= Sun Lakes =

Sun Lakes may refer to places in the United States:

- Sun Lakes, Arizona
- Sun Lakes-Dry Falls State Park in Washington
- Sun Lakes Park Resort in Washington
