= Disautel Pass =

Mountain pass in Washington

- Elevation: 3,252 ft (991 m)
- Traversed by: State Route 155

Third Approach
- Location: Okanogan County, Washington, United States
- Range: Okanogan Highlands

Disautel Pass (el. 3252 ft./991 m.) is a mountain pass in the state of Washington.

It is traversed by State Route 155 between Grand Coulee and Omak, and is located on the Colville Indian Reservation about 12 miles Northwest of Colville Indian Agency.
