= Grand Coulee, Washington =

- City
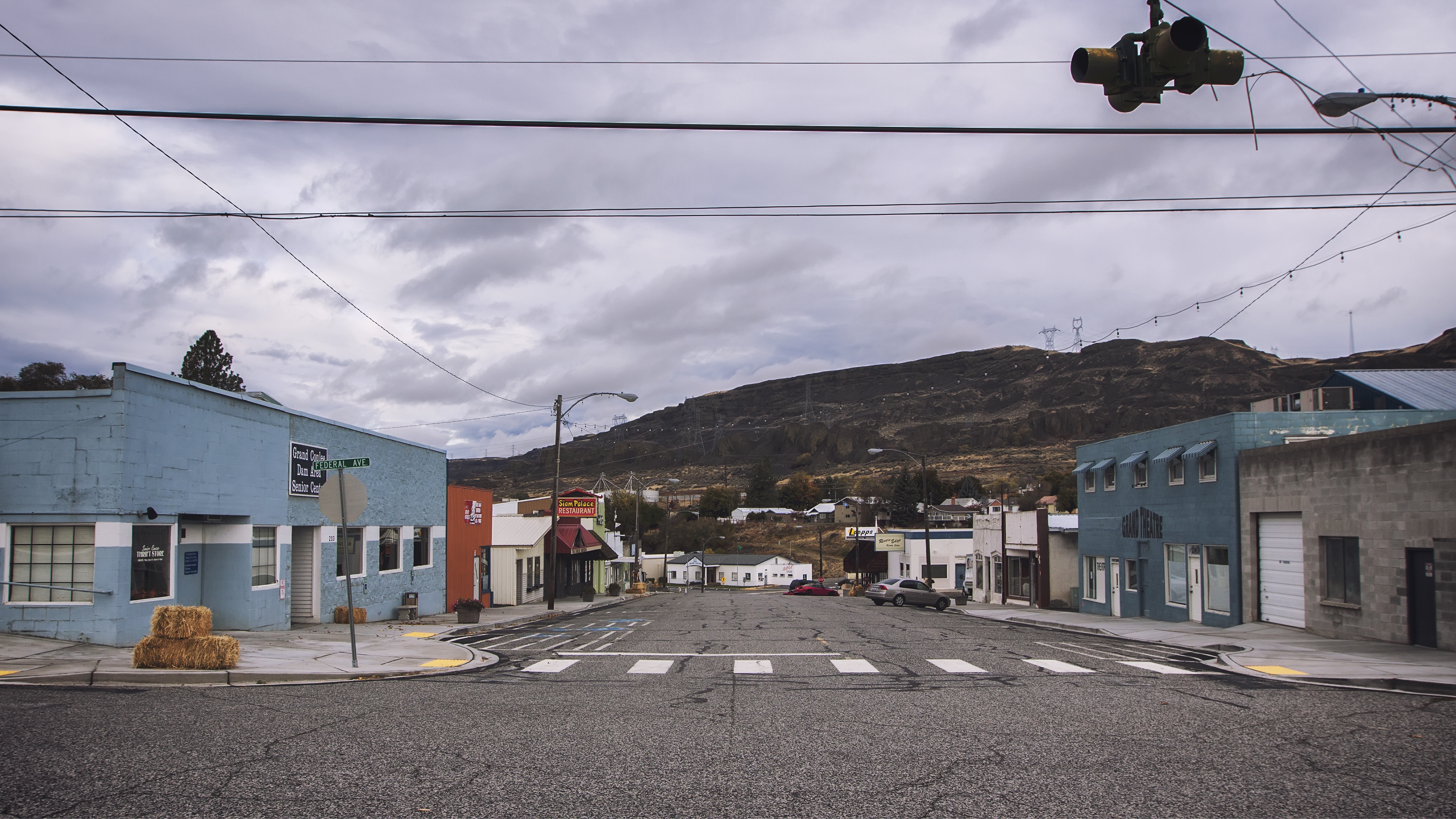
- Main Street, Grand Coulee, WA

- Location of Grand Coulee, Washington
- Coordinates: 47°56′13″N 118°59′53″W
- Country: United States
- State: Washington
- County: Grant

Government
  - Type: Mayor–council
  - Mayor: Ruth Dalton

Area
  - Total: 1.36 sq mi (3.53 km^{2})
  - Land: 1.25 sq mi (3.25 km^{2})
  - Water: 0.11 sq mi (0.28 km^{2})
- Elevation: 1,542 ft (470 m)

Population (2020)
  - Total: 972
  - Density: 834.1/sq mi (322.06/km^{2})
- Time zone: UTC-8 (Pacific (PST))
  - Summer (DST): UTC-7 (PDT)
- ZIP code: 99133
- Area code: 509
- FIPS code: 53-27855
- GNIS feature ID: 2410630
- Website: gccitywa.org

Grand Coulee is a city in Grant County, Washington, United States. The population was 972 at the 2020 census.

== History ==
Grand Coulee was officially incorporated on November 6, 1935. It is located above the Grand Coulee Dam and next to North Dam.

== Geography ==
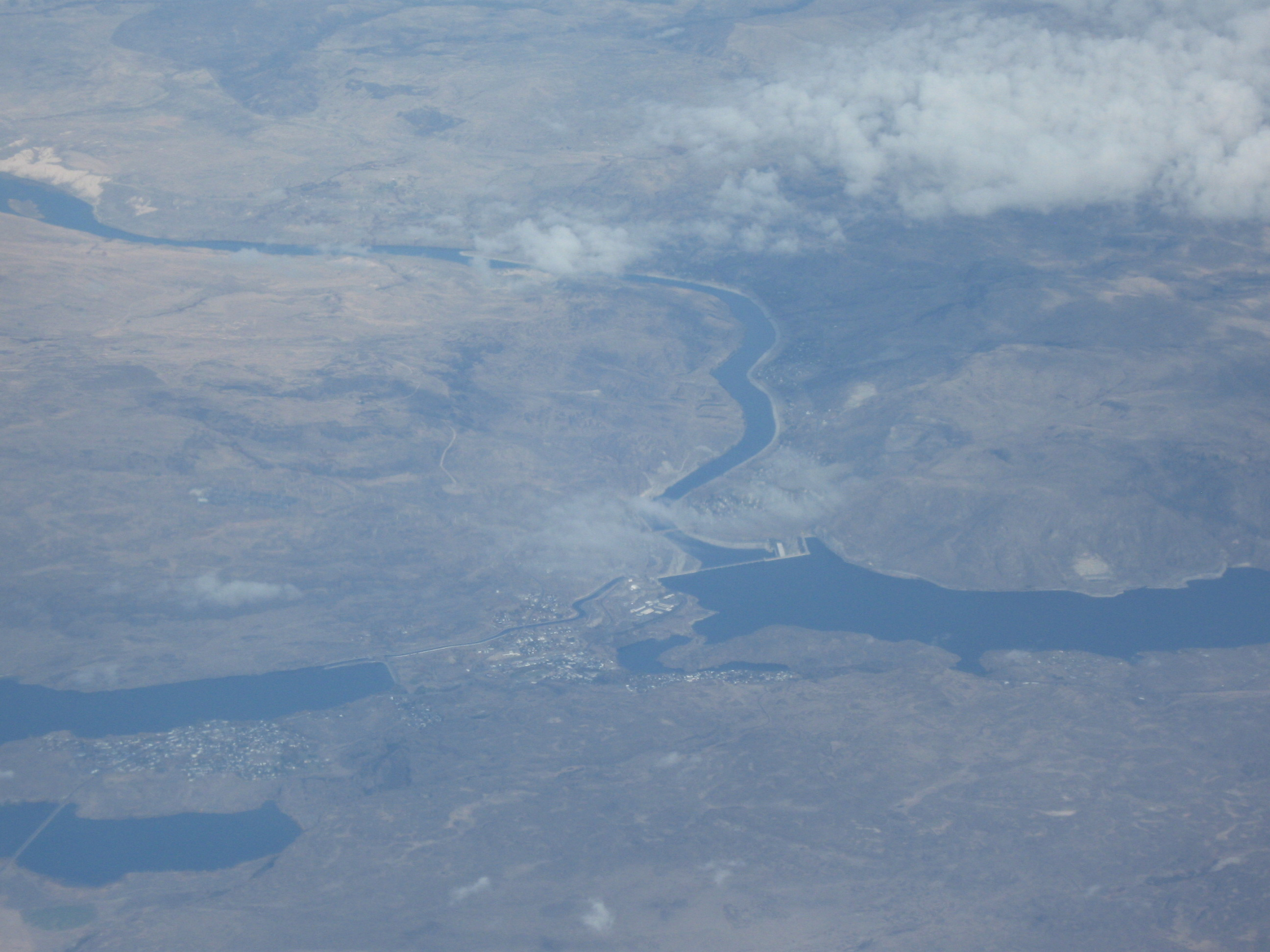
Aerial view from the south with Grand Coulee located centrally, Electric City to the left and Coulee Dam to the right.

According to the United States Census Bureau, the city has a total area of 1.29 square miles (3.34 km^{2}), of which, 1.19 square miles (3.08 km^{2}) is land and 0.10 square miles (0.26 km^{2}) is water.

The city of Grand Coulee is located at the northern end of its namesake, the Grand Coulee, the canyon-like walls of which rise from the 1,483 feet above sea level in the city to over 2,300 feet immediately south of the city. The terrain falls off approximately 200 feet from the city to the shore of Crescent Bay and Lake Roosevelt immediately to the east of the city. Electric City is approximately 1.5 miles to the southwest and the town of Coulee Dam is approximately three miles to the north. The three cities are connected by Washington State Route 155, which has a junction with Washington State Route 174 in Grand Coulee.

=== Climate ===
Climate data for Grand Coulee, Washington
Month	Jan	Feb	Mar	Apr	May	Jun	Jul	Aug	Sep	Oct	Nov	Dec	Year
Record high °F (°C)	61 (16)	61 (16)	73 (23)	91 (33)	100 (38)	102 (39)	108 (42)	110 (43)	103 (39)	84 (29)	69 (21)	58 (14)	110 (43)
Mean daily maximum °F (°C)	33 (1)	40 (4)	52 (11)	61 (16)	70 (21)	78 (26)	87 (31)	87 (31)	77 (25)	61 (16)	43 (6)	32 (0)	60 (16)
Mean daily minimum °F (°C)	23 (−5)	25 (−4)	31 (−1)	37 (3)	45 (7)	51 (11)	58 (14)	57 (14)	49 (9)	39 (4)	30 (−1)	22 (−6)	39 (4)
Record low °F (°C)	−17 (−27)	−15 (−26)	—	21 (−6)	21 (−6)	36 (2)	40 (4)	38 (3)	30 (−1)	7 (−14)	−10 (−23)	−16 (−27)	−17 (−27)
Average precipitation inches (mm)	1.06 (27)	1.00 (25)	0.91 (23)	0.87 (22)	1.15 (29)	1.05 (27)	0.64 (16)	0.28 (7.1)	0.44 (11)	0.68 (17)	1.30 (33)	1.45 (37)	10.83 (274.1)

== Demographics ==
Historical population
Census	Pop.	Note	%±
1940	3,659		—
1950	2,741		−25.1%
1960	1,058		−61.4%
1970	1,302		23.1%
1980	1,180		−9.4%
1990	984		−16.6%
2000	897		−8.8%
2010	988		10.1%
2020	972		−1.6%
U.S. Decennial Census; 2020 Census

=== 2020 census ===
As of the 2020 census, Grand Coulee had a population of 972. The median age was 49.5 years. 17.0% of residents were under the age of 18 and 25.8% of residents were 65 years of age or older. For every 100 females there were 104.6 males, and for every 100 females age 18 and over there were 99.8 males age 18 and over.

0.0% of residents lived in urban areas, while 100.0% lived in rural areas.

There were 462 households in Grand Coulee, of which 19.7% had children under the age of 18 living in them. Of all households, 33.5% were married-couple households, 28.8% were households with a male householder and no spouse or partner present, and 29.9% were households with a female householder and no spouse or partner present. About 38.3% of all households were made up of individuals and 16.7% had someone living alone who was 65 years of age or older.

There were 551 housing units, of which 16.2% were vacant. The homeowner vacancy rate was 4.6% and the rental vacancy rate was 10.0%.

Racial composition as of the 2020 census
Race	Number	Percent
White	638	65.6%
Black or African American	18	1.9%
American Indian and Alaska Native	162	16.7%
Asian	7	0.7%
Native Hawaiian and Other Pacific Islander	2	0.2%
Some other race	35	3.6%
Two or more races	110	11.3%
Hispanic or Latino (of any race)	76	7.8%

=== 2010 census ===
As of the 2010 census, there were 988 people, 474 households, and 246 families residing in the city. The population density was 830.3 inhabitants per square mile (320.6/km^{2}). There were 554 housing units at an average density of 465.5 per square mile (179.7/km^{2}). The racial makeup of the city was 76.5% White, 1.1% African American, 14.2% Native American, 0.8% Asian, 3.5% from other races, and 3.8% from two or more races. Hispanic or Latino of any race were 8.9% of the population.

There were 474 households, of which 21.9% had children under the age of 18 living with them, 36.9% were married couples living together, 10.5% had a female householder with no husband present, 4.4% had a male householder with no wife present, and 48.1% were non-families. 40.5% of all households were made up of individuals, and 16.3% had someone living alone who was 65 years of age or older. The average household size was 2.06 and the average family size was 2.74.

The median age in the city was 47.1 years. 19.3% of residents were under the age of 18; 6.9% were between the ages of 18 and 24; 21.5% were from 25 to 44; 32.2% were from 45 to 64; and 20.4% were 65 years of age or older. The gender makeup of the city was 48.2% male and 51.8% female.

=== 2000 census ===
As of the 2000 census, there were 897 people, 410 households, and 246 families residing in the city. The population density was 816.9 people per square mile (314.8/km^{2}). There were 530 housing units at an average density of 482.7 per square mile (186.0/km^{2}). The racial makeup of the city was 81.27% White, 1.11% African American, 12.49% Native American, 1.34% Asian, 2.79% from other races, and 1.00% from two or more races. Hispanic or Latino of any race were 4.91% of the population.

There were 410 households, out of which 25.6% had children under the age of 18 living with them, 44.1% were married couples living together, 12.2% had a female with no husband present, and 39.8% were non-families. 35.1% of all households were made up of individuals, and 15.6% had someone living alone who was 65 years of age or older. The average household size was 2.13 and the average family size was 2.71.

In the city, the age distribution of the population shows 22.5% under the age of 18, 6.6% from 18 to 24, 20.4% from 25 to 44, 26.9% from 45 to 64, and 23.6% who were 65 years of age or older. The median age was 45 years. For every 100 females, there were 92.5 males. For every 100 females age 18 and over, there were 80.5 males.

The median income for a household in the city was $21,818, and the median income for a family was $29,375. Males had a median income of $25,625 versus $18,125 for females. The per capita income for the city was $13,639. About 11.7% of families and 19.3% of the population were below the poverty line, including 25.3% of those under age 18 and 17.6% of those age 65 or over.

== Education ==
The city is served by the Grand Coulee Dam School District.

== Notable people ==
- John Norman Abelson, a molecular biologist, was born in Grand Coulee in 1938
