= Washington State Route 155 =

State highway in Washington County, Washington, US

State Route 155

- A map of SR 155's area with the highway highlighted in red.

Route information
- Auxiliary route of US 97
- Maintained by WSDOT
- Length: 78.35 mi (126.09 km)
- Existed: 1964–present

Major junctions
- South end: US 2 near Coulee City
- SR 174 in Grand Coulee; SR 155 Spur in Omak
- North end: US 97 / SR 20 in Omak

Location
- Country: United States
- State: Washington

Highway system
- State highways in Washington; Interstate; US; State; Scenic; Pre-1964; 1964 renumbering; Former
← SR 153	→ SR 160

State Route 155 is a state highway in the U.S. state of Washington, running from U.S. Route 2 near Coulee City over Disautel Pass to U.S. Route 97 and State Route 20 in the city of Omak. It is the main north–south route through the area around Grand Coulee Dam.

== Route description ==
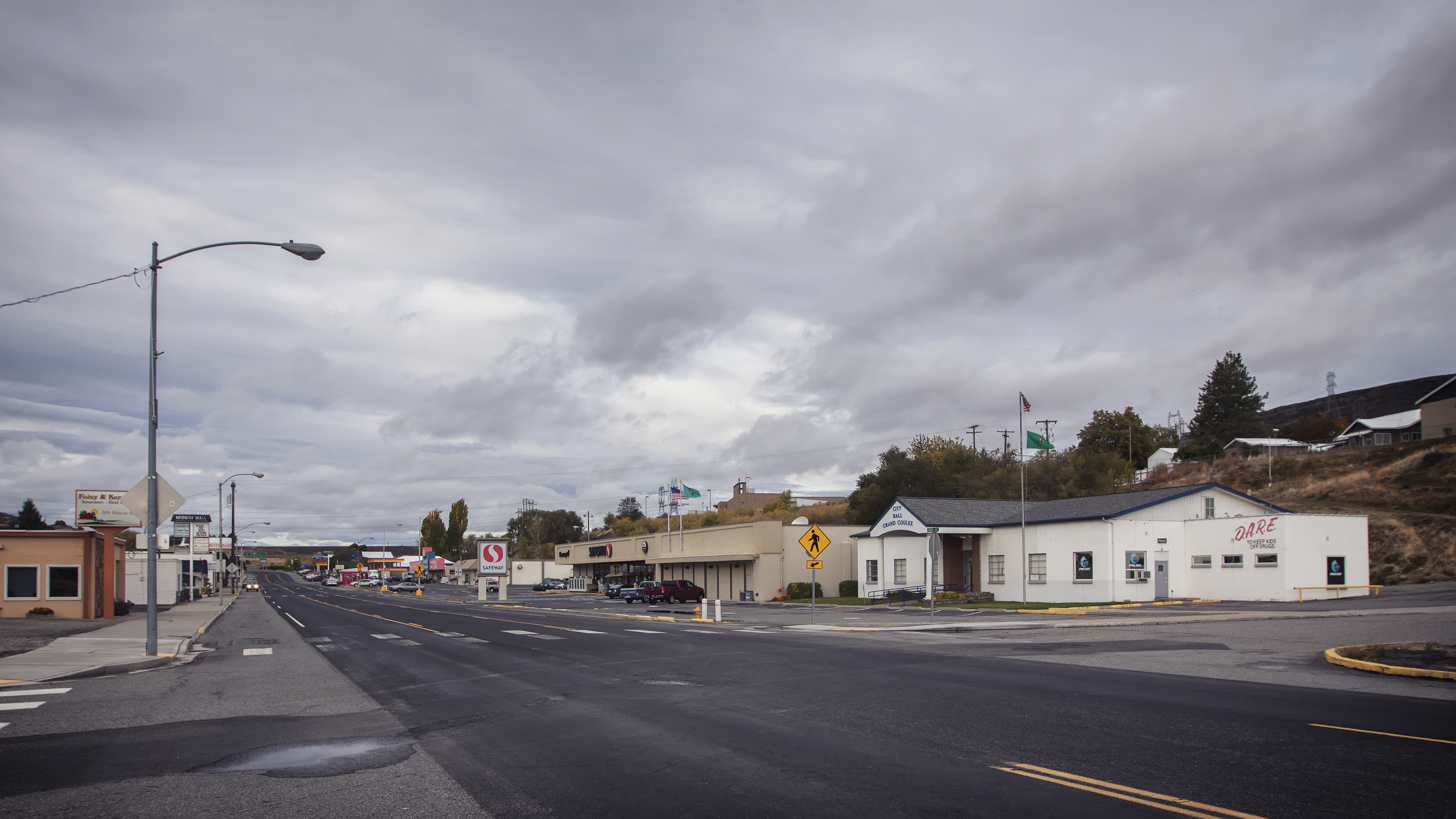
State Route 155 through Grand Coulee, WA

State Route 155 begins at an intersection with U.S. Route 2 northeast of Coulee City. From there, the highway heads north, paralleling the shore of Banks Lake for much of the southern part of the route. After passing Steamboat Rock State Park, it crosses over Osborn Bay Lake before passing through Electric City. It then intersects State Route 174 in Grand Coulee. The highway then heads northeast, crossing the Columbia River just north of the Grand Coulee Dam.

On the north side of the Columbia, State Route 155 turns west and traverses the Colville Indian Reservation, passing through the communities of Nespelem and Disautel, crossing Disautel Pass at an elevation of 3,252 feet (991 m). As the highway descends from the pass, it approaches the town of Omak on Omak Avenue. On the east side of the town, it crosses under the two-lane carriageway of U.S. Route 97 and State Route 20. Since there is no access immediately at this underpass, State Route 155 continues three blocks west before turning south along Dayton Street to access U.S. Route 97.

At the intersection of Omak Avenue and Dayton Street, a spur route of State Route 155 begins and continues west along Omak Avenue to terminate at State Route 215 in downtown Omak. This was the original alignment of State Route 155 before U.S. Route 97 was realigned onto its current bypass. State Route 155 Spur is 0.37 miles (0.60 km) long.

== History ==
When State Route 155 was first established in 1964, U.S. Route 97 passed through downtown Omak and Okanogan on what is now State Route 215, rather than on its easterly bypass as it does today. Thus, State Route 155 continued west on what is now State Route 155 Spur to terminate at U.S. Route 97 in downtown Omak. When the US 97 bypass was built a few years later, State Route 155 was rerouted onto its current alignment.

Prior to the 1964 highway renumbering, the section of State Route 155 from Coulee City to the Grand Coulee Dam was numbered Secondary State Highway 2F. From Grand Coulee to Omak, it was numbered Secondary State Highway 10A.

== Spur route ==
State Route 155 Spur
- Location: Omak
- Length: 0.37 mi (600 m)
- Existed: 1975–present

A short spur route of SR 155 connects the main highway to downtown Omak, traveling for 0.37 miles (0.60 km) on Omak Avenue. It continues west from the US 97/SR 20 underpass and crosses over the Okanogan River before ending at an intersection with SR 215. The spur route was designated on the former route of SR 155 prior to the construction of the US 97 expressway in eastern Omak.

WSDOT plans to rebuild the spur route's crossing of the Okanogan River in 2025 with wider lanes by replacing the sidewalks with a parallel pedestrian bridge.

== Major intersections ==
County	Location	mi	km	Destinations	Notes
Grant		0.00	0.00	US 2 – Seattle, Spokane	Southern terminus
Grant	Grand Coulee	25.71	41.38	SR 174 – Bridgeport, Wilbur, Spokane	
Douglas	No major junctions				
Columbia River		26.46– 26.66	42.58– 42.91	Grand Coulee Bridge	
Okanogan	Omak	78.03	125.58	SR 155 Spur to SR 215 – Omak	Former SR 155
Okanogan	Omak	78.35	126.09	US 97 / SR 20 – Tonasket, Oroville, Okanogan, Wenatchee	Northern terminus
1.000 mi = 1.609 km; 1.000 km = 0.621 mi
