= Glacial Lake Columbia =

Lake Columbia
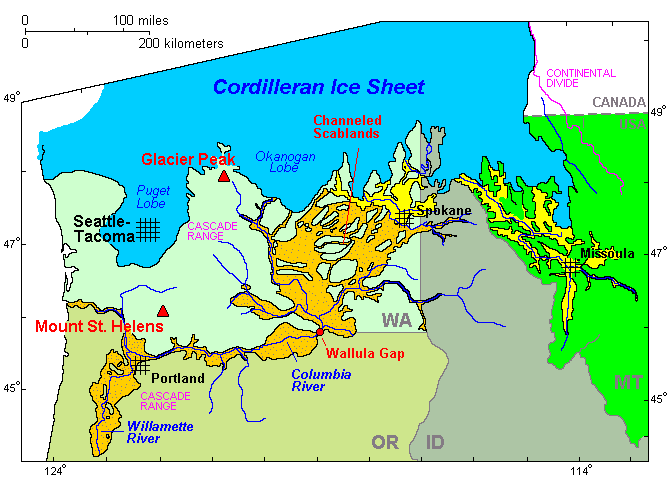
- Cordilleran Ice Sheet maximum extent of Glacial Lake Missoula (eastern) and Glacial Lake Columbia (western) areas swept by Missoula and Columbia floods

- Location within Washington (state) Location within the United States
- Location: North America
- Coordinates: 47.95°N 118.96°W
- Lake type: former lake
- Primary inflows: Corderillian Ice Sheet
- Primary outflows: Foster Coulee; Moses Coulee; Grand Coulee
- Basin countries: United States
- Max. length: 30 mi (48 km)
- Max. width: 20 mi (32 km)
- Surface area: 500 sq mi (1,295 km^{2})
- Max. depth: 600 ft (183 m)
- Surface elevation: 1,600 ft (488 m)

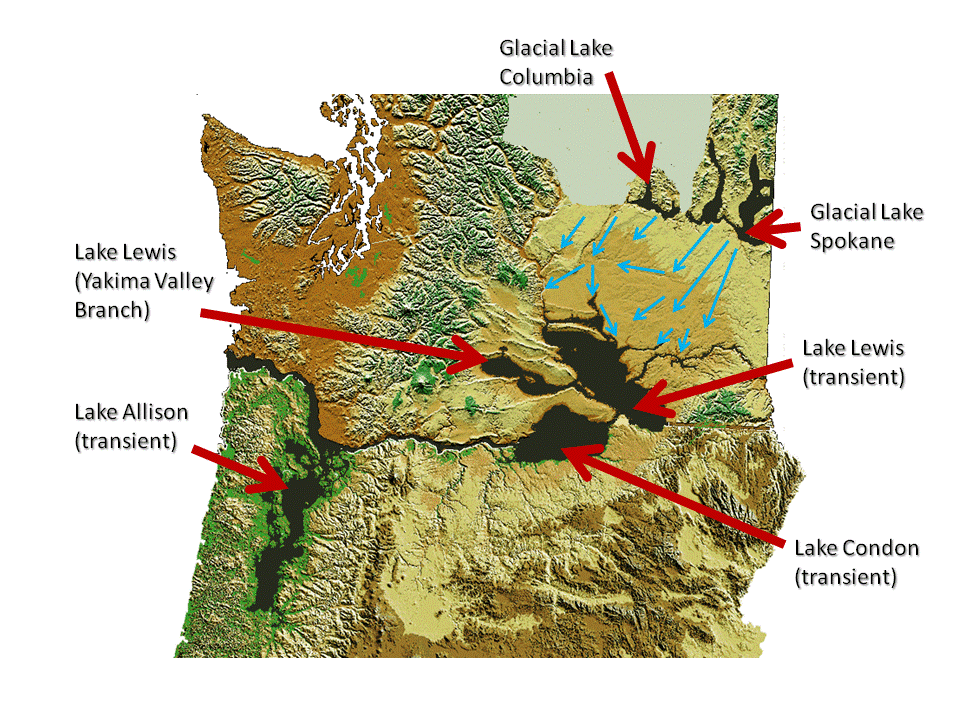
Location of Glacial Lake Columbia

Glacial Lake Columbia was the lake formed on the ice-dammed Columbia River behind the Okanogan lobe of the Cordilleran Ice Sheet when the lobe covered 500 square miles (1,300 km^{2}) of the Waterville Plateau west of Grand Coulee in central Washington state during the Wisconsin glaciation. Lake Columbia was a substantially larger version of the modern-day lake behind the Grand Coulee Dam. Lake Columbia's overflow – the diverted Columbia River – drained first through Foster Coulee, and as the ice dam grew, then through Moses Coulee, and finally, the Grand Coulee.

== Glacial Lake Missoula ==
The Cordilleran ice sheet also blocked the Clark Fork River and created Glacial Lake Missoula, rising behind a 2,000 feet (610 m) high ice dam in flooded valleys of western Montana. Over 2000 years the ice dam periodically failed, releasing approximately 40 high-volume Missoula Floods of water down the Columbia River drainage, passing through glacial Lake Columbia. The largest flood is estimated to be the initial flood at 2,500 km^{3} (600 mi^{3}), with subsequent floods occurring at roughly 20 to 80 year intervals. Since Lake Columbia was impounded behind the Okanogan lobe, which rose to 1,300 meters (4,300 ft), this lobe effectively blocked the normal course of the Columbia River, blocking the Missoula Floods and diverting water to flow across much of eastern Washington state. The erosion from the floods created the Grand Coulee as well as the Dry Falls, Palouse Falls, and the Channeled Scablands features of eastern Washington state.

== Flood deposits ==
Flood beds on the Sanpoil arm of glacial Lake Columbia show episodic flood deposits as well as deposit grading and rhythmical repetition. Since Glacial Lake Columbia remained filled between Missoula floods, annual deposits (varves) can be observed between the Missoula flood deposits, they help to establish the periodicity of these major floods. The flood deposits can be distinguished from annually-deposited varves by both their thickness and the presence of materials foreign to the immediate drainage. Atwater reports from 35 to 55 annual varves between flood deposits in Lake Columbia, supporting a period of 35 to 55 years between ice dam failures.
