= Dry Falls =

Scalloped precipice with four major alcoves, in central Washington scablands

Coordinates: 47°36′0″N 119°21′25″W

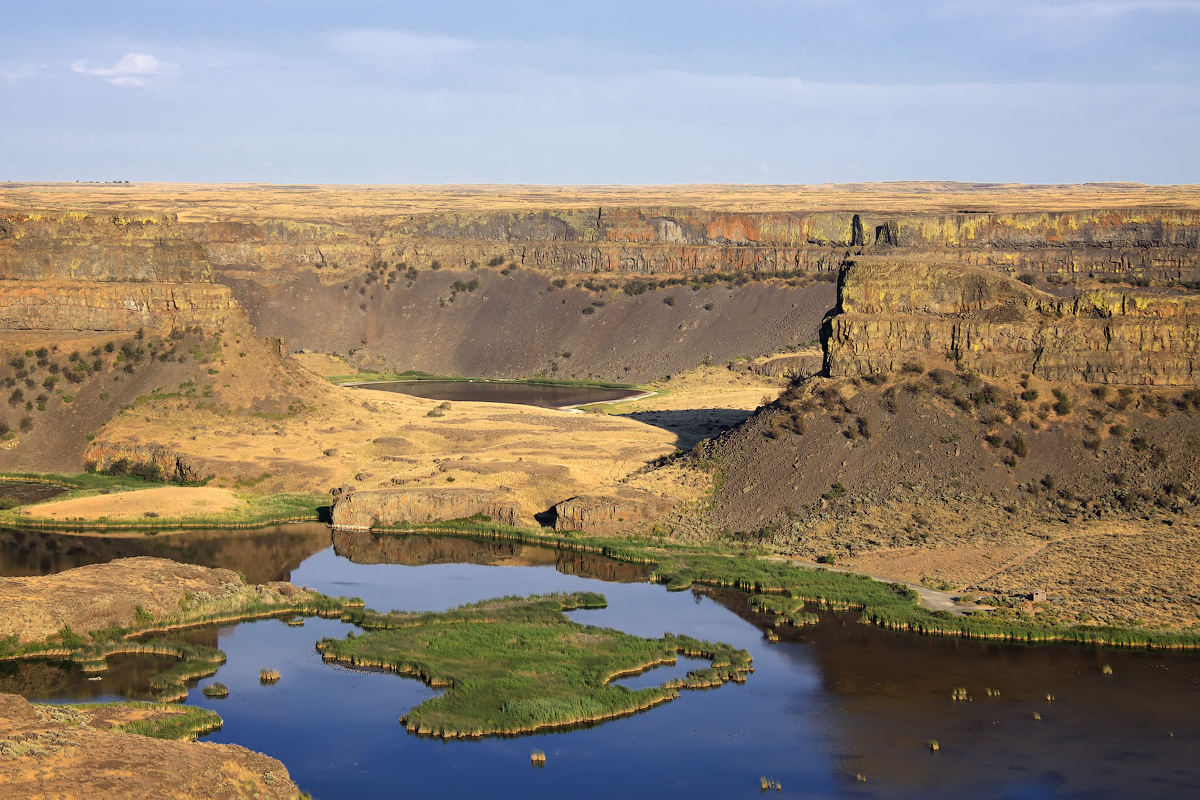

- Location within Washington (state)
- Location: Grant County, Washington, United States
- Type: Block
- Elevation: 1,510 ft (460 m)
- Total height: 400 ft (120 m)
- Total width: 3.5 mi (5.6 km)
- Average flow rate: None

Dry Falls is a 3.5-mile-long (5.6 km) scalloped precipice with four major alcoves, in central Washington scablands. This cataract complex is on the opposite side of the Upper Grand Coulee from the Columbia River, and at the head of the Lower Grand Coulee, northern end of Lenore Canyon. According to the current geological model, catastrophic flooding channeled water at 65 miles per hour (105 kph) through the Upper Grand Coulee and over this 400-foot (120 m) rock face at the end of the last glaciation. It is estimated that the falls were five times the width of Niagara Falls, with ten times the flow of all the current rivers in the world combined.

Nearly twenty thousand years ago, as glaciers moved south through North America, an ice sheet dammed the Clark Fork River near Sandpoint, Idaho. Consequently, a significant portion of western Montana flooded, forming the gigantic Lake Missoula. About the same time, Glacial Lake Columbia was formed on the ice-dammed Columbia River behind the Okanogan lobe of the Cordilleran Ice Sheet. Lake Columbia's overflow – the diverted Columbia River – drained first through Moses Coulee and as the ice dam grew, later through the Grand Coulee.

Eventually, water in Lake Missoula rose high enough to float the ice dam until it gave way, and a portion of this cataclysmic flood spilled into Glacial Lake Columbia, and then down the Grand Coulee. It is generally accepted that this process of ice-damming of the Clark Fork, refilling of Lake Missoula and subsequent cataclysmic flooding happened dozens of times over the years of the last Ice Age.

This sudden flood put parts of Idaho, Washington, and Oregon under hundreds of feet of water in just a few days. These extraordinary floods greatly enlarged the Grand Coulee and Dry Falls in a short period. The large plunge pools at the base of Dry Falls were created by these floods.

Once the ice sheet that obstructed the Columbia melted, the river returned to its normal course, leaving the Grand Coulee and the falls dry. Today, this massive cliff can be viewed from the Dry Falls Interpretive Center, part of Sun Lakes-Dry Falls State Park, located on Route 17 near the town of Coulee City. Admission is free, although a Discover Pass is required for parking.

Today the upper Grand Coulee is filled by Banks Lake, dammed by the Dry Falls Dam.

== See also ==
- Echus Chasma
- Guaíra Falls
- List of waterfalls
