= Sun Lakes-Dry Falls State Park =

State park in Washington State, United States

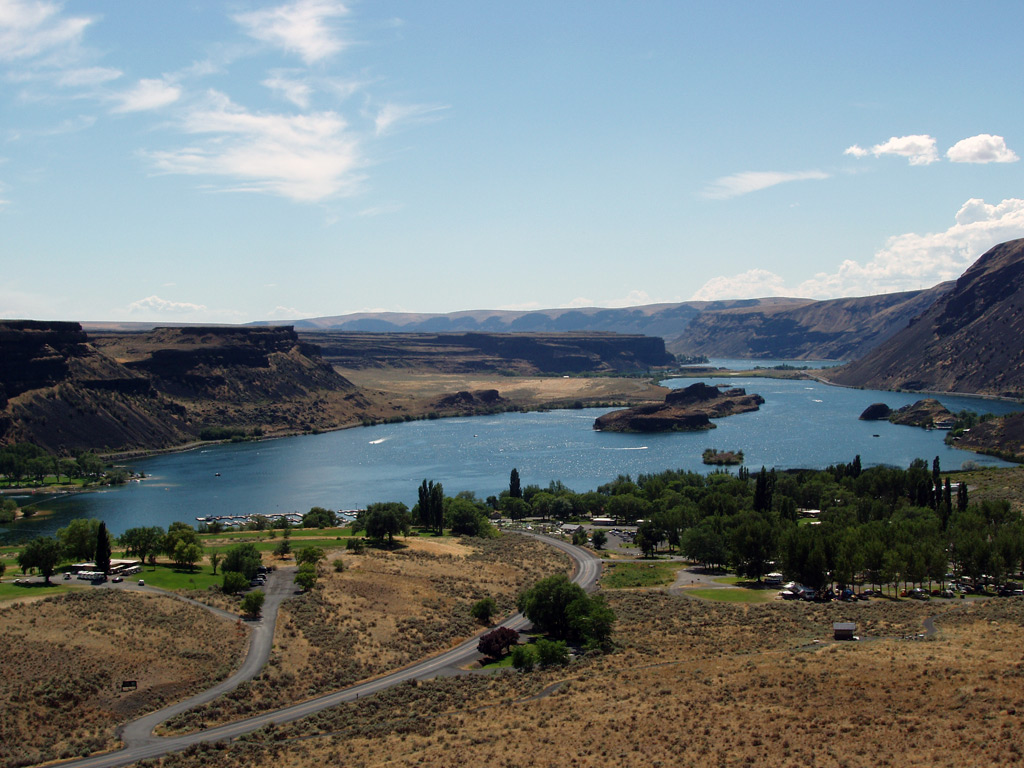

- Location within Washington (state) Location within the United States
- Location: Grant County, Washington, United States
- Coordinates: 47°36′17″N 119°20′51″W
- Area: 3,774 acres (1,527 ha)
- Elevation: 1,545 ft (471 m)
- Established: 1933
- Administrator: Washington State Parks and Recreation Commission
- Website: Official website

Sun Lakes-Dry Falls State Park (formerly, Sun Lakes State Park) is a public recreation area located at the foot of Dry Falls, three miles (4.8 km) west of Coulee City in Grant County, Washington. The state park covers 3,774 acres (1,527 ha) along Route 17 at the head of the Lower Grand Coulee.

== Park history ==
The state purchased land to create the state park from 1933 through 1972. Fifteen parcels were purchased from the Bureau of Land Management, the Department of Natural Resources, and private interests. The Civilian Conservation Corps built rock walls and a lookout at Dry Falls called Vista House in 1938. The CCC workers also constructed a residence and water pump house.

The Camp Delany group retreat facility was added to the park in 1956, the buildings at Sun Lakes Park Resort were constructed in 1959, and the interpretive center overlooking Dry Falls was built in 1965.

== Features ==
Dry Falls is a stark cliff measuring 400 feet (120 m) high and 3.5 miles (5.6 km) wide. It was the site of a waterfall formed during the Missoula Floods which was ten times the size of Niagara Falls. The cliff overlooks a desert oasis filled with lakes and abundant wildlife. It is a prime example of shrub-steppe habitat.

Umatilla Rock is a large basalt rock which resisted being eroded by the Great Floods. Its location is downstream of the falls and upstream of the main park and resort. Nearby lakes include Dry Falls, Perch, Red Alkali, Green Alkali, and Meadow.

== Activities and amenities ==
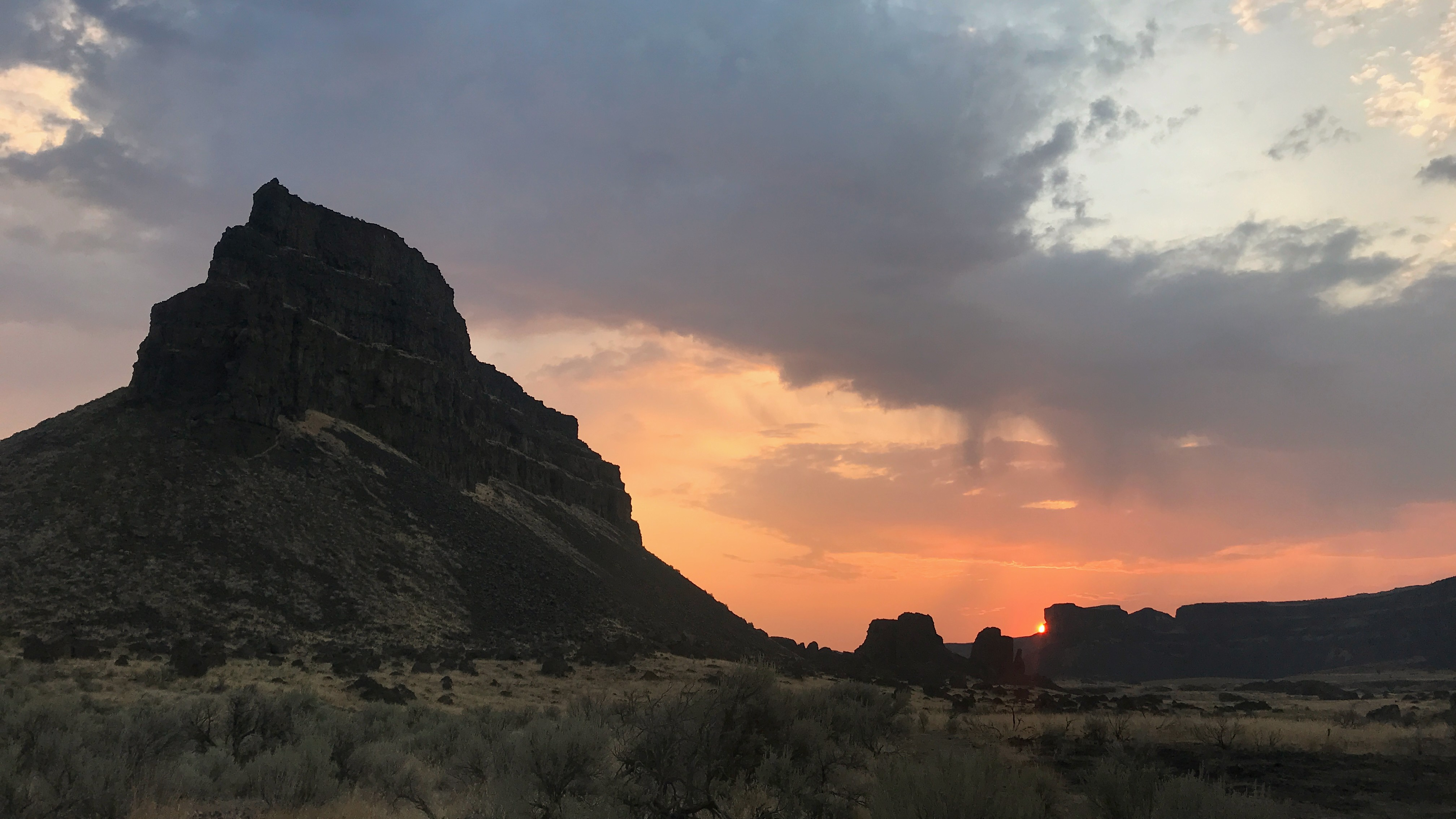
Umatilla Rock at sunrise

The park has 73,640 feet (22,450 m) of lake shoreline and offers fishing, swimming, boating, hiking, and golf. The park's interpretive center offers exhibits on area geology.

The Umatilla Rock Trail is accessible via a dirt road from the main portion of the park. The trailhead is located near the southwest portion of the rock. The five-mile round-trip trail navigates the outer circumference of the rock. An alternate section cuts up and over a notch on the northeast portion of the rock.

=== Sun Lakes Park Resort ===
Sun Lakes Park Resort

The Sun Lakes Park Resort, a privately operated recreational area leased from the state, is located within the park along Park Lake. It includes an RV park, rental cabins, a golf course, concessions, and rentals for boats and other watersports equipment.
