= Steamboat Rock State Park =

State park in Washington (state), US

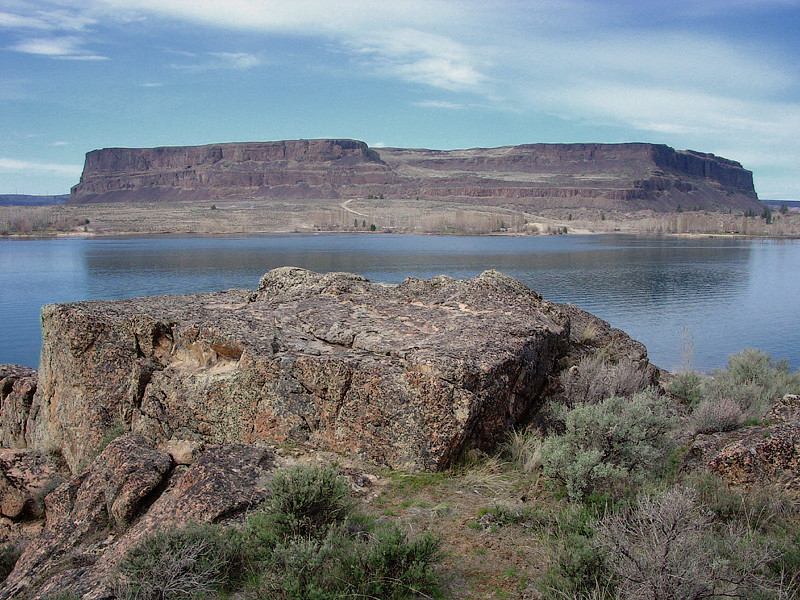

- Location within Washington (state) Location within the United States
- Location: Grant County, Washington, United States
- Coordinates: 47°52′15″N 119°07′58″W
- Area: 5,043 acres (2,041 ha)
- Elevation: 2,293 ft (699 m)
- Established: 1972
- Administrator: Washington State Parks and Recreation Commission
- Website: Official website

Steamboat Rock State Park is a 5,043-acre (2,041 ha) public recreation area located near the north end of Banks Lake in the Grand Coulee. The state park takes its name from the landscape's dominating feature, Steamboat Rock, a basalt butte that rises 800 feet (240 m) above the lake which nearly completely surrounds it. The butte's plateau covers more than 600 acres (240 ha) and was used by nomadic Native American tribes and by early settlers. During the last ice age, the monolith stood as an island in the new bed of the Columbia River where it had been diverted by ice dams. Once the dams burst creating massive floods and the Scablands, the Columbia returned to its original course, leaving Steamboat Rock as a prominent feature of the dry Grand Coulee.

== Activities and amenities ==
The park has 50,000 feet (15,000 m) of shoreline and is open year-round for camping and day use. The park has trails for hiking, biking, and equestrian use as well as water activities including boating, swimming, waterskiing, and fishing. Winter activities include cross-country skiing, ice fishing, and ice climbing.
