= Grand Coulee =

Ancient river bed in the U.S. state of Washington

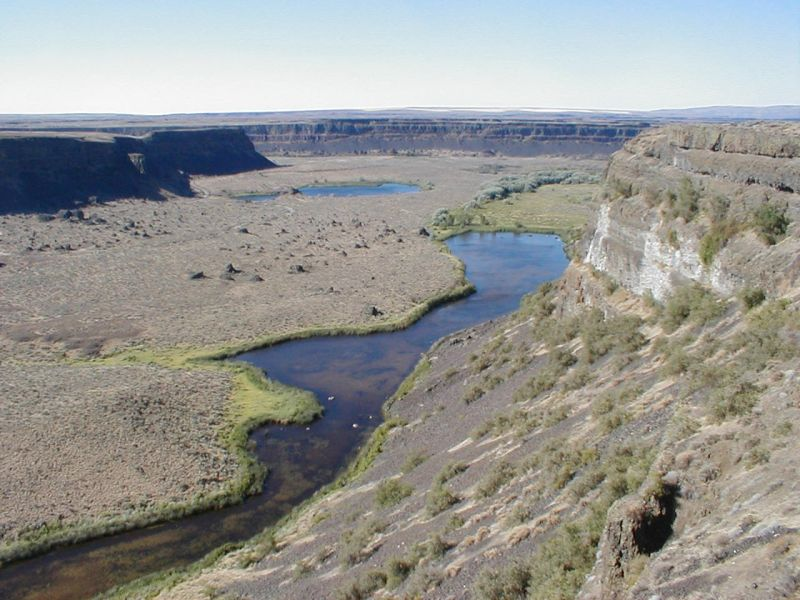
- Grand Coulee, below Dry Falls. The layering effect of periodic basalt lava flows is visible.

- Location within Washington (state)
- Location: Washington state
- Coordinates: 47.62°N 119.3075°W

U.S. National Natural Landmark
- Designated: 1965

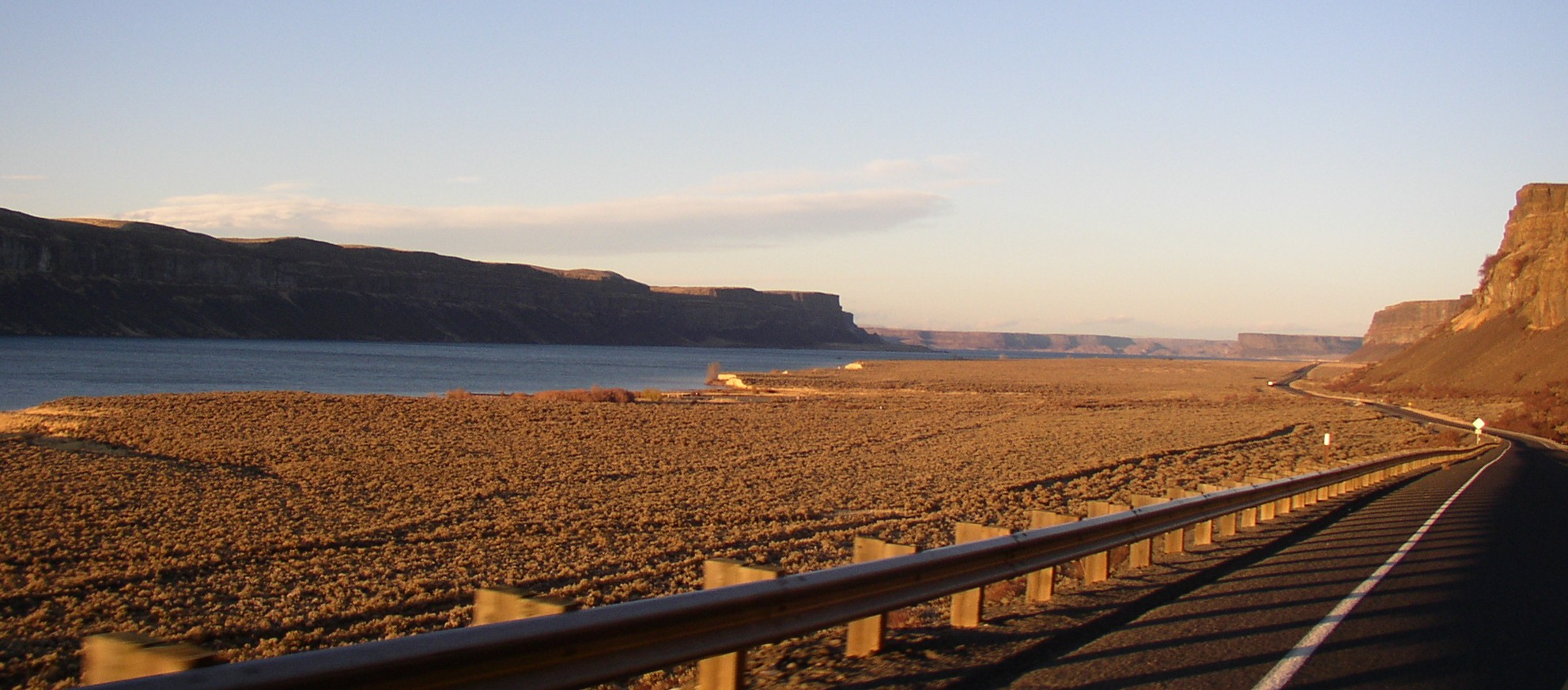
Looking northward in Grand Coulee

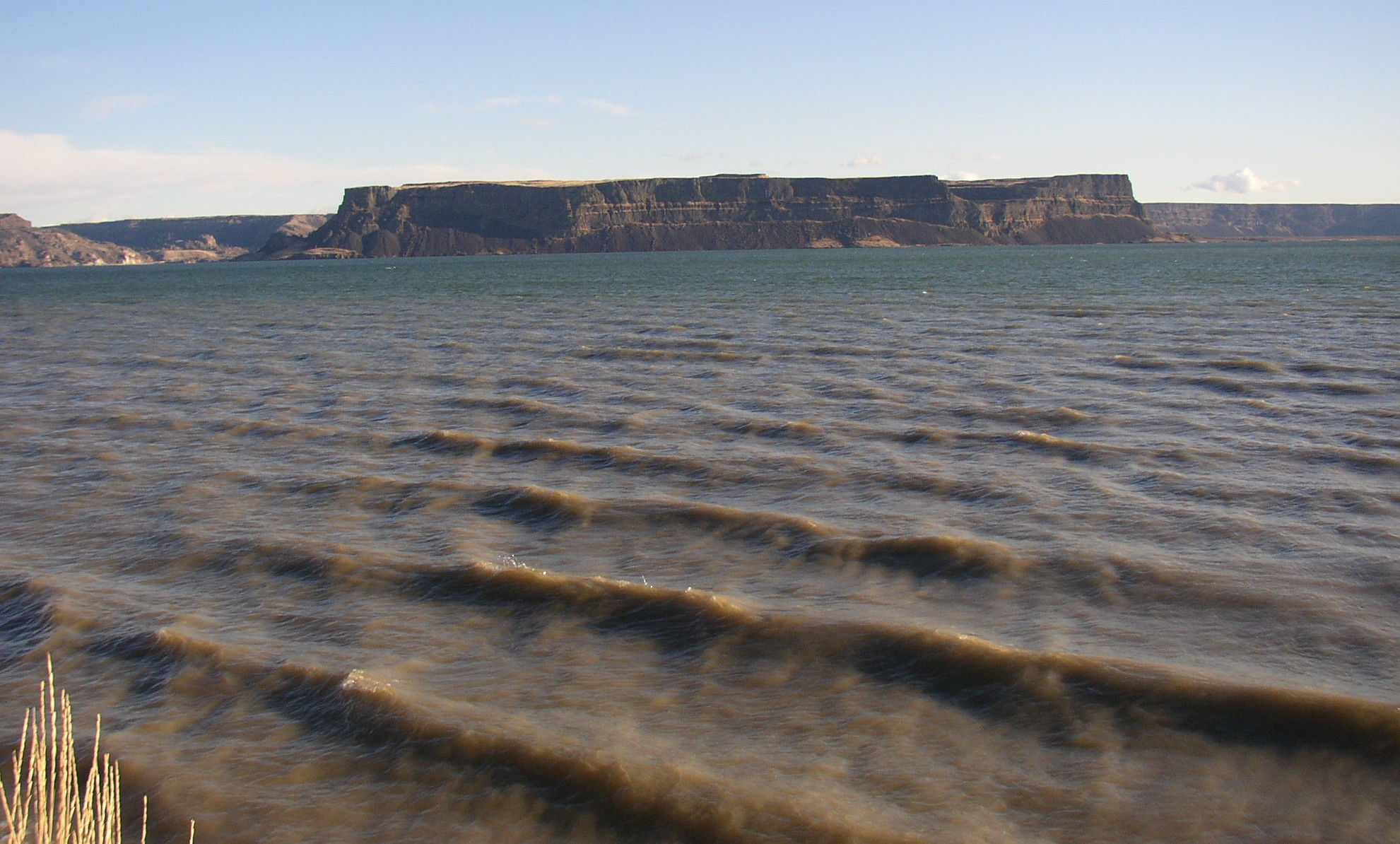
Steamboat Rock in the Grand Coulee

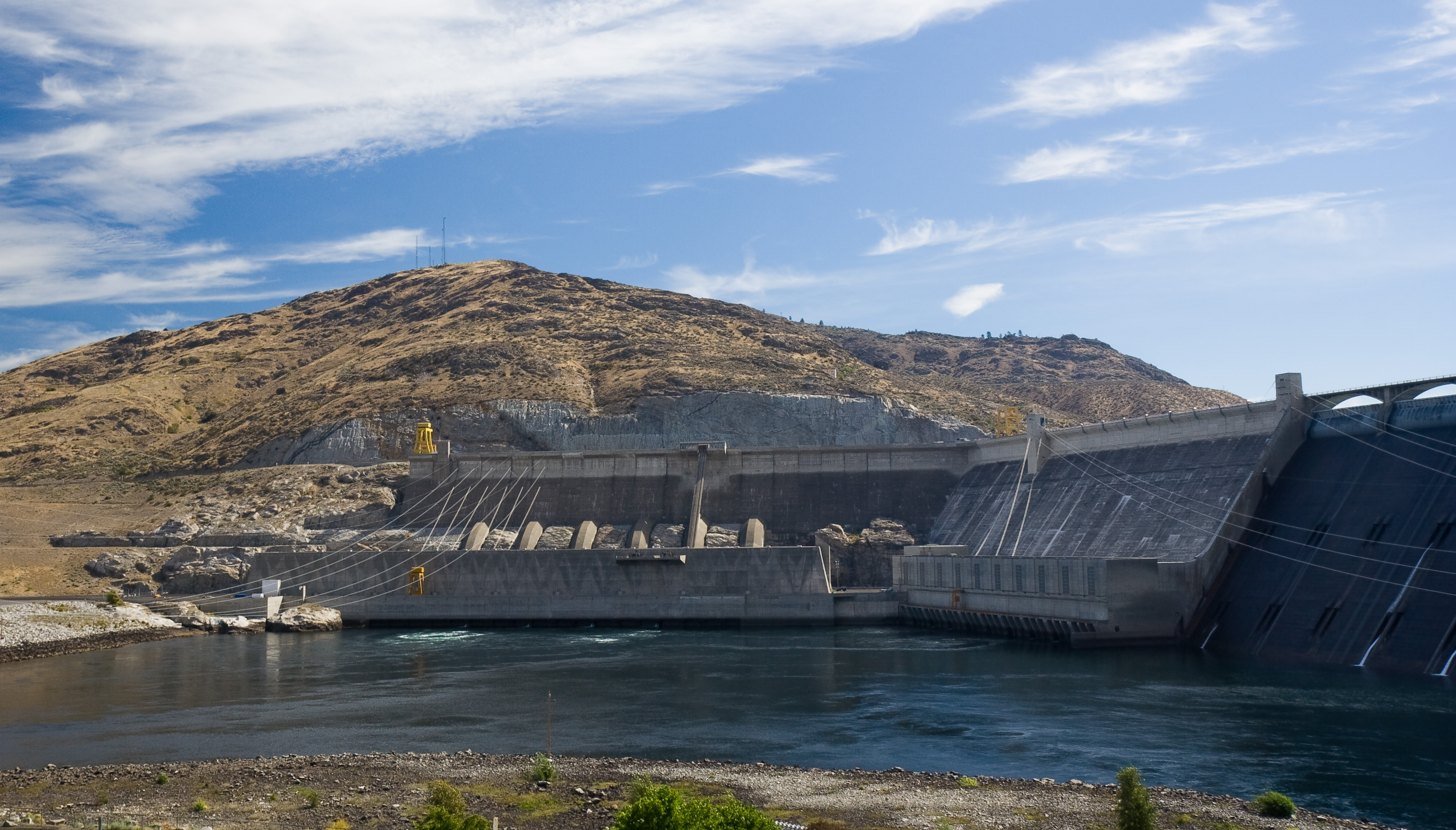
Part of the Grand Coulee has been dammed and filled with water as part of the Columbia Basin Project.

Grand Coulee is an ancient river bed in the U.S. state of Washington. This National Natural Landmark stretches for about 60 miles (97 km) southwest from Grand Coulee Dam to Soap Lake, being bisected by Dry Falls into the Upper and Lower Grand Coulee.

== Geological history ==
Grand Coulee is a large coulee on the Columbia River Plateau. This area has underlying granite bedrock, formed deep in the Earth's crust 40 to 60 million years ago. The land periodically uplifted and subsided over millions of years giving rise to some small mountains and, eventually, an inland sea.

From about 10 to 18 million years ago, a series of volcanic eruptions from the Grand Ronde Rift near the Idaho/Oregon/Washington/Montana border began to fill the inland sea with lava. In some places the volcanic basalt is 6,600 feet (2,000 m) thick. In other areas granite from the earlier mountains is still exposed.

Starting about two million years ago, during the Pleistocene epoch, glaciation took place in the area. Large parts of northern North America were repeatedly covered with glacial ice sheets, at times reaching over 10,000 feet (3,000 m) in thickness. Periodic climate changes resulted in corresponding advances and retreats of ice.

About 18,000 years ago a large finger of ice advanced into present-day Idaho, forming an ice dam known as the Purcell lobe at what is now Lake Pend Oreille. The Purcell lobe blocked the Clark Fork River drainage, thus creating an enormous lake reaching far back into mountain valleys of western Montana. Leaks may have developed around and under the ice, causing the dam to fail. The 500 cubic miles (2,100 km^{3}) of water in Lake Missoula was released in just 48 hours—a torrential flood equivalent to ten times the combined flow of all the rivers in the world.

This mass of water and ice, 2,000 feet (610 m) high near the ice dam before release, flowed across the Columbia Basin, moving at speeds of up to 65 miles per hour (105 km/h). The deluge stripped away soil, cut deep canyons and carved out 50 cubic miles (210 km^{3}) of earth, leaving behind areas of stark scabland.

Over nearly 2,500 years the cycle was repeated many times. Most of the displaced soil created new landforms, but some was carried far out into the Pacific Ocean. In Oregon's Willamette Valley, as far south as Eugene, the cataclysmic flood waters deposited fertile soil and icebergs left numerous boulders from as far away as Montana and Canada. At present day Portland, the water measured 400 feet (120 m) deep. A canyon 200 feet (61 m) deep is carved into the far edge of the continental shelf. The web-like formation can be seen from space. Mountains of gravel as tall as 40-story buildings were left behind; boulders the size of small houses and weighing many tons were strewn about the landscape.

Grooves in the exposed granite bedrock are still visible in the area from the movement of glaciers, and numerous erratics are found in the elevated areas to the northwest of the coulee.

Early theories suggested that glaciers diverted the Columbia River into what became the Grand Coulee and that normal flows caused the erosion observed. In 1910 Joseph T. Pardee described a great Ice Age lake, "Glacial Lake Missoula", a glacier dammed lake with water up to 1,970 feet (600 m) deep, in northwest Montana and in 1940 he reported his discovery that giant dunes 50 feet (15 m) high and 200–500 feet (61–152 m) feet apart had formed the lake bed. In the 1920s, J Harlen Bretz looked deeper into the landscape and put forth his theory of the dam breaches and massive glacial floods from Lake Missoula.

Of the Channeled Scablands, Dry Falls, one of the largest waterfalls ever known, is an excellent example (south of Banks Lake).

It is probable that humans were witnesses, and victims, of the immense power of the Ice Age floods. Archeological records date human presence back to nearly the end of the Ice Age, but the raging torrents erased the land of clear evidence, leaving us to question who, if anyone, may have survived. With the end of the last glacial advance, the Columbia settled into its present course. The river bed is about 660 feet (200 m) below the Grand Coulee. Walls of the coulee reach 1,300 feet (400 m) in height.

== Upper Coulee ==
Grand Coulee is the longest and deepest of eastern Washington canyons. Its unique characteristics include a lower floor at the head of the channel than at its outlet and the widest and highest dry falls cliff in the middle. It was created through the process of cataract recession, which included a cataract twice as high as its existing Dry Falls.

Grand Coulee is two canyons, with an open basin in the middle. The Upper Coulee, filled by Banks Lake, is 25 miles (40 km) long with walls 800 to 900 feet (240 to 270 m) tall. It links to the Columbia River at Grand Coulee Dam and leads southward, through the surrounding highlands. The entry to the coulee is 650 feet (200 m) above the Columbia. It began as the course of a Glacial Columbia River. The Cordilleran ice sheet's Okanogan lobe extended southward across the Columbia Rivers pathway and onto the southern plateau creating an ice dam. This dam backed up the waters of the Columbia into Glacial Lake Columbia and later during the Missoula floods forced those waters into eastern Washington, creating the Scablands.

The river at Grand Coulee found no existing valley and thus forged its own pathway across the divide, creating the Upper Coulee. The plateau is not level, but is marked with wrinkles and upfolds of the basalt. The diverted waters of the Columbia encountered the monoclinal flexure, a steep warping up of 1,000 feet (300 m) toward the northwest. Lake Columbia topped the ridge at the higher side of the flexure. Encountering the steep slope of the monocline, the new river would have cascaded off the rim, 800 feet (240 m) down onto a broad plain where Coulee City and Dry Falls State Park now stand.

=== Waterfall erosion ===
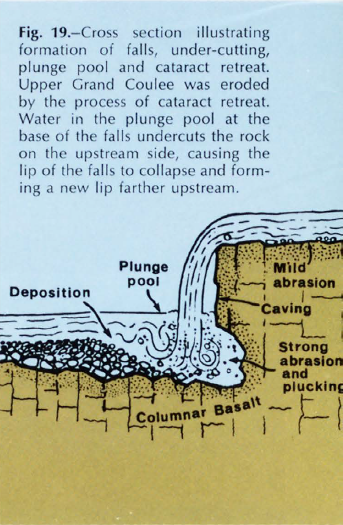
Formation of Grand Coulee

Upper Grand Coulee began as an 800-foot (240 m) cascade just north of Coulee City. As the rush of water eroded the surface, it steepened into a waterfall. The falls continued to erode backward (northward) creating the canyon. When the falls reached the divide into Lake Columbia, i.e., preglacial Columbia Valley, it disappeared, leaving the elongated notch. Today, the waters of the Lake Roosevelt are pumped 280 feet (85 m) from the Grand Coulee Dam, into Banks Lake to act as an Equalizing Reservoir and irrigation water source.

Evidence of the waterfalls includes a plunge basin where the falls began, immediately south of Coulee City. It contains at least 300 feet (91 m) of gravel lower than the open flooring of the land. The river above the falls was shallow and much wider than the gorge. Thus, it wrapped around the lip of the main falls creating lateral falls. These flowed until the recession of the main falls denied them water. Northrup Canyon in Steamboat Rock State Park contains a dry cataract as wide as Niagara Falls and three times as high. Steamboat Rock, 880 feet (270 m) high and a 1 square mile (2.6 km^{2}) in area, now stands as an isolated rise, but for a time it created two cataracts. When the falls passed north of Steamboat Rock, it found a granite base beneath the basal flows. Granite lacks the close vertical joints of basalt and resisted the erosion from the cataract's plunge. It remains as hills on the broad floor of the Coulee. Some gravel-bar deposits are visible along the Route 155. They provide evidence of eddies in the lee of rock shoulders.

== Lower Coulee ==
Dry Falls is at the head of Lower Grand Coulee. The Great Cataract forms the divide from the upper to lower coulees. The Lower Coulee tends along the monoclinal flexure to Soap Lake where the canyons end and the water flowed out into Quincy Basin. Quincy Basin is filled with the eroded gravels and silts from the Coulee. The Lower Coulee also created its own path across the plains. Evidence of this is found in the tilted flows visible at Hogback islands in Lake Lenore and tilted flows along Washington 17 from Dry Falls to Park Lake. Numerous canyons acted as a distribution system for the volume of water flowing out of the upper coulee. The distribution begins in the uncanyoned basin below Dry Falls and expanded to over 15 miles (24 km) before reaching Quincy Basin. One cataract (Unnamed Coulee) is 150 feet (46 m) high and had three alcoves over more than 1 mile (1.6 km). There is no channel as the water arrived in a broad sheet. The gravel deposits of Quincy Basin represent only a third or a fourth of the estimated 11 cubic miles of rock excavated from the Grand Coulee and its smaller other related coulees (Dry, Long Lake, Jasper, Lenore, and Unnamed). Most of the debris was carried on through and beyond Quincy Basin.

The Ephrata Fan (a.k.a. "Ephrata Erratic Fan") is a gravel fan formed when floodwaters from the lower Grand Coulee entered the Quincy Basin during the formation of the Scablands.

== Modern uses ==
The area surrounding the Grand Coulee is shrub-steppe habitat, with an average annual rainfall of less than twelve inches (300 mm). The Lower Grand Coulee contains Park, Blue, Alkali, Lenore, and Soap lakes. Until recently, the Upper Coulee was dry. The Columbia Basin Project changed this in 1952, using the ancient river bed as an irrigation distribution network. The Upper Grand Coulee was dammed and turned into Banks Lake. The lake is filled by pumps from the Grand Coulee Dam and forms the first leg of a one-hundred-mile (160 km) irrigation system. Canals, siphons, and more dams are used throughout the Columbia Basin, supplying over 600,000 acres (240,000 ha) of farm land.

Water has turned the Upper Coulee and surrounding region into a haven for wildlife, including bald eagle. Recreation is a side benefit and includes several lakes, mineral springs, hunting and fishing, and water sports of all kinds. Sun Lakes and Steamboat Rock state parks are both found in the Grand Coulee. However, the lake has also flooded a large area of natural habitat and native hunting grounds, displacing local Native Americans.

== See also ==
- North Dam
