= Okanagan Country =

Region of British Columbia, Canada

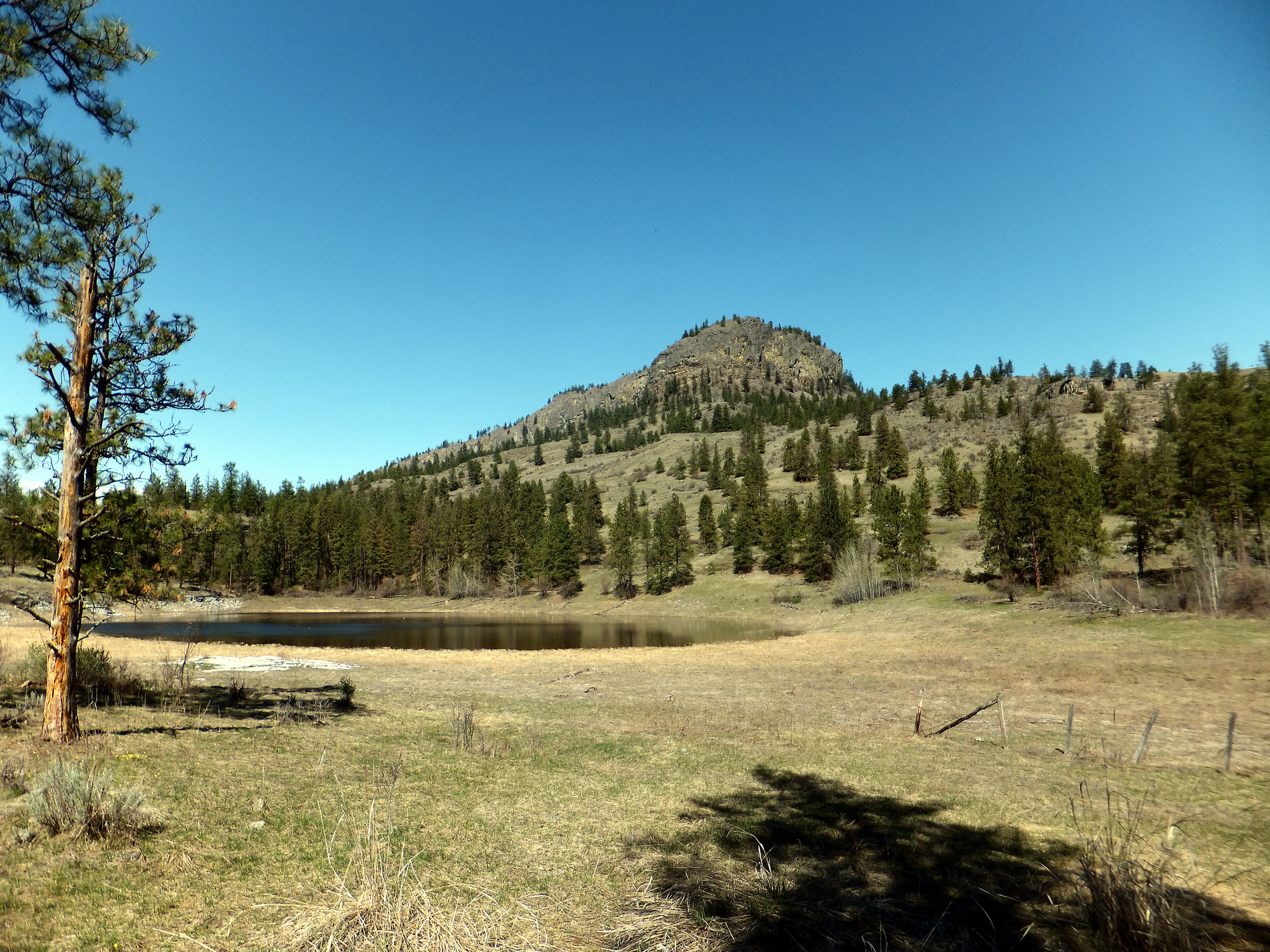
Mahoney Lake Ecological Reserve

The Okanagan Country, also known as the Okanagan Valley, is a region located in the Canadian province of British Columbia and the U.S. state of Washington (where it is spelled the Okanogan Country), defined by the basin of Okanagan Lake and the Okanagan River. With an estimated 400,000 residents, the Okanagan Country spans from the Thompson Plateau near Grindrod, British Columbia in the Okanagan to the Okanagan Highland near Douglas County, Washington in the Okanogan. The largest city in the Canadian portion is Kelowna, with a metropolitan population of 222,162 residents as of 2021, while the largest city in the American portion is Omak, with 4,860 residents as of 2020. The region took its current name in honor of the Okanagan term, ukʷnaqín. The mild climate and close proximity to lakes, rivers and mountainous regions make the Okanagan Country an outdoor recreational destination. The region's economy is dominated by the primary sector industries of agriculture and forestry, although economic diversification has also occurred with retirement communities and recreational tourism. The U.S. portion is considered to be more remote than the Canadian division, with approximately 10 percent of the population.

== Geography ==
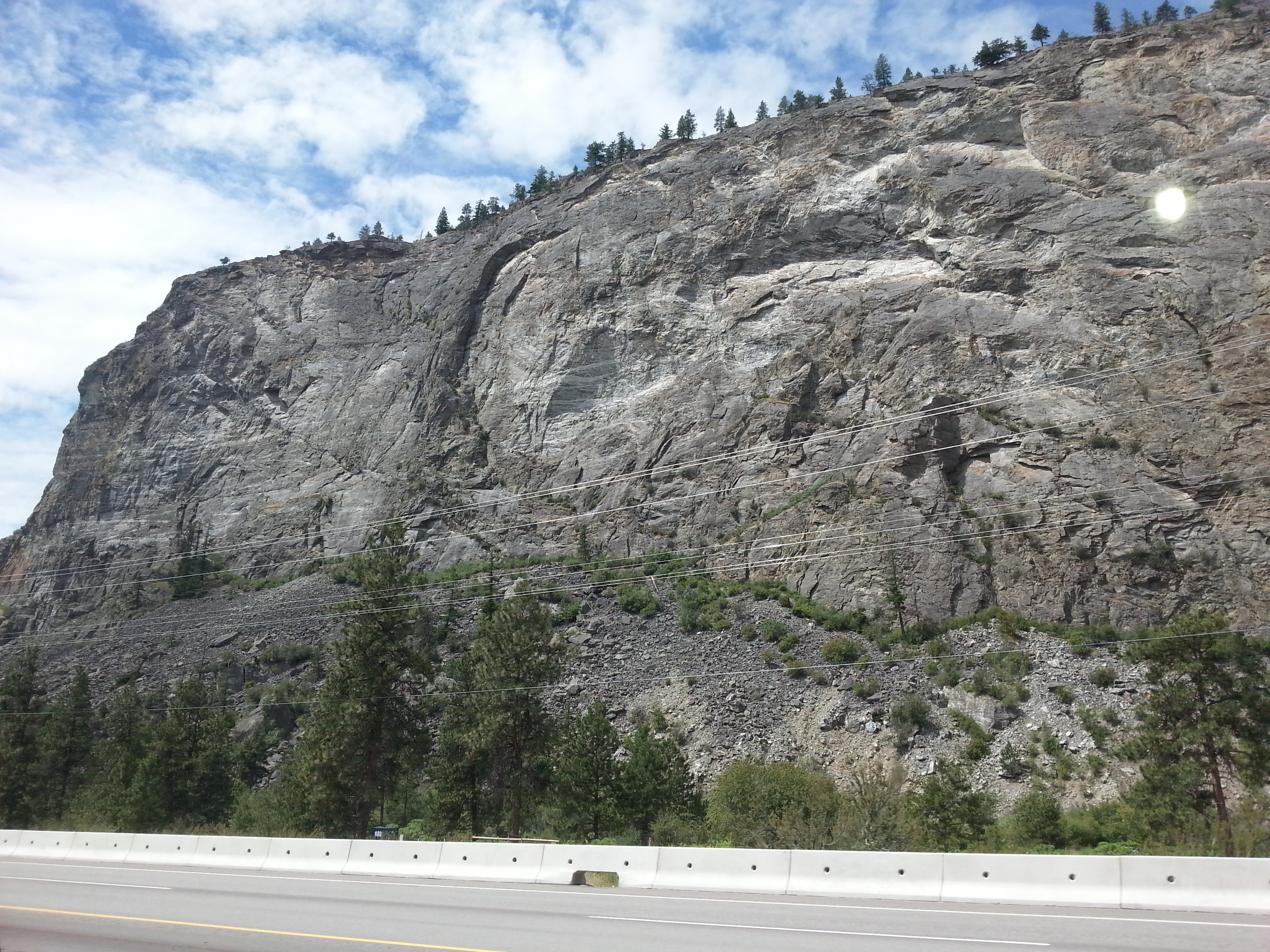
View of McIntyre Bluff from Highway 97.

The Shuswap Highland and Thompson Plateau, coming out of the unincorporated community of Grindrod, defines the northern border of the region; the terrain here is mountainous and hilly. The southern border is defined by Chelan, Douglas and Grant counties, although portions of these counties lie within the Okanagan Country. The Canada–United States border, which features an official crossing into Osoyoos from Oroville, separates the Okanagan and Okanogan subregions from each other. The Okanagan Highland and Okanagan Basin define the main geographic features, serving as plateau-like hilly areas. The Okanagan River and Okanagan Lake are the most prominent water features in the Okanagan Country, with a combined area of 320 square kilometres (120 sq mi). According to Statistics Canada and the United States Census Bureau, the divided region comprises a total area of more than 40,441 square kilometres (15,614 sq mi), larger than Belgium and Taiwan. The extended region within Chelan, Douglas and Grant divisions make a larger area. The largest municipality by area in the Okanagan Country is Spallumcheen, covering 255.77 square kilometres (98.75 sq mi), making it larger than Seattle by land area. The southernmost community is Electric City, in Grant County. Other geographic features include Alta Lake, Columbia River, Cascade Mountains, Kalamalka Lake, North Gardner Mountain, Mahoney Lake, Mara Lake, McIntyre Bluff, Omak Lake, Osoyoos Lake, Similkameen River, Shuswap River, Skaha Lake, Swan Lake, Tuc-el-nuit Lake, Vaseaux Lake and Wood Lake.

== Climate ==
Like most of southern British Columbia and central Washington, the Okanagan Country experiences a semi-arid climate (Köppen climate classification BSk), with little precipitation, hot summers and moderate winters. Northern communities have more precipitation and receive cooler temperatures. The city of Kelowna is generally considered to be a transition point between the semi-arid south and the somewhat wetter north, accompanied by a change in climate classification to humid continental (Dfb). Vegetation ranges from cactus and sagebrush in the southern portion, to cedar and hemlock trees in the northern portion. The region was affected by 1872 North Cascades earthquake, the state's largest historical earthquake, on December 14, 1872. The center of the earthquake was located at Omak Lake. The earthquake had a magnitude between 6.5 and 7.0 and was followed by an aftershock.

== Municipalities ==
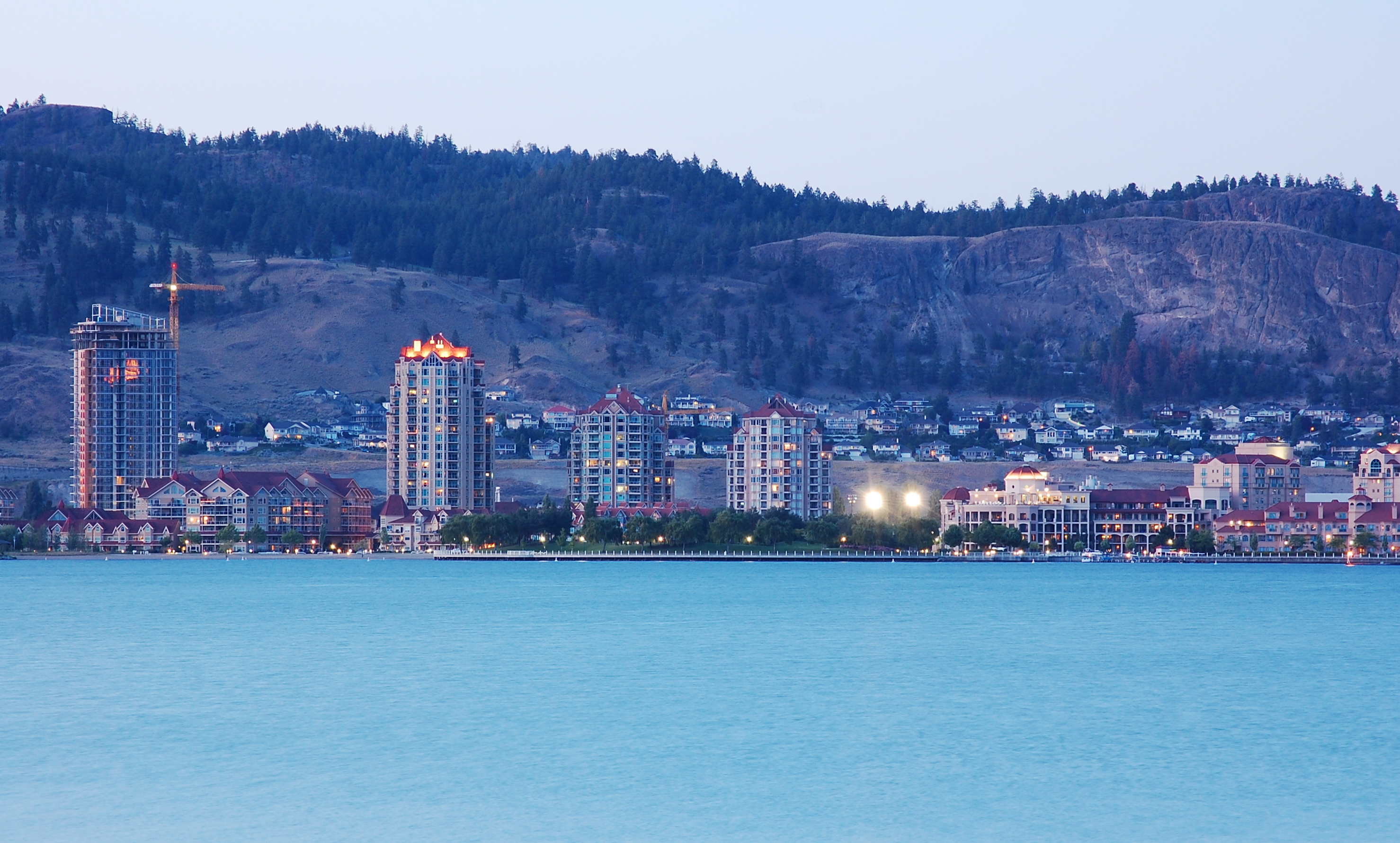
Kelowna, British Columbia

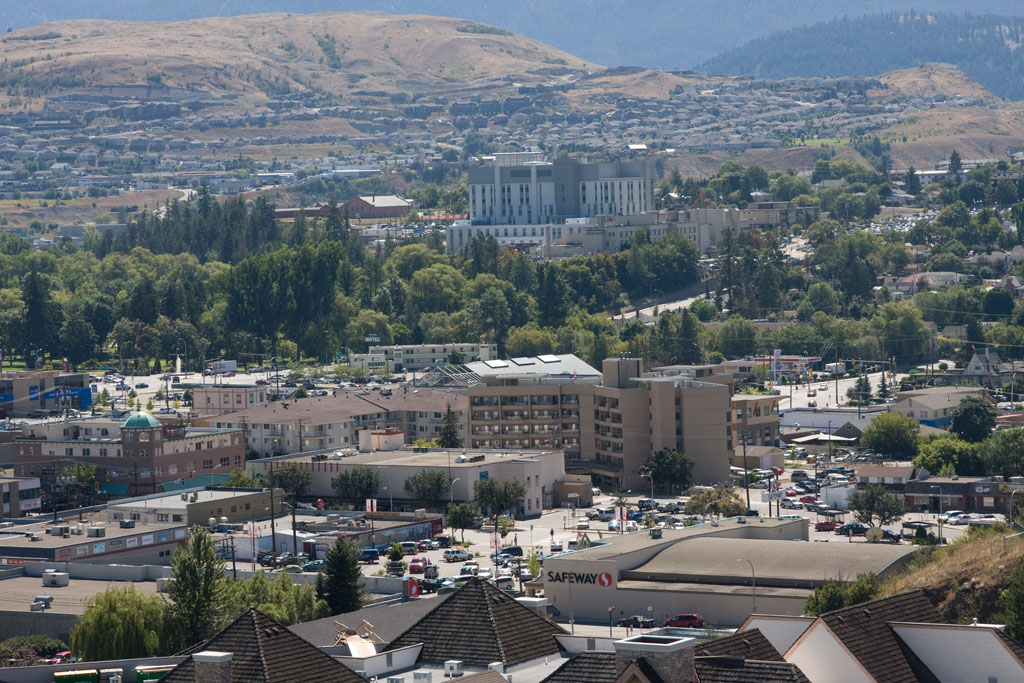
Vernon, British Columbia

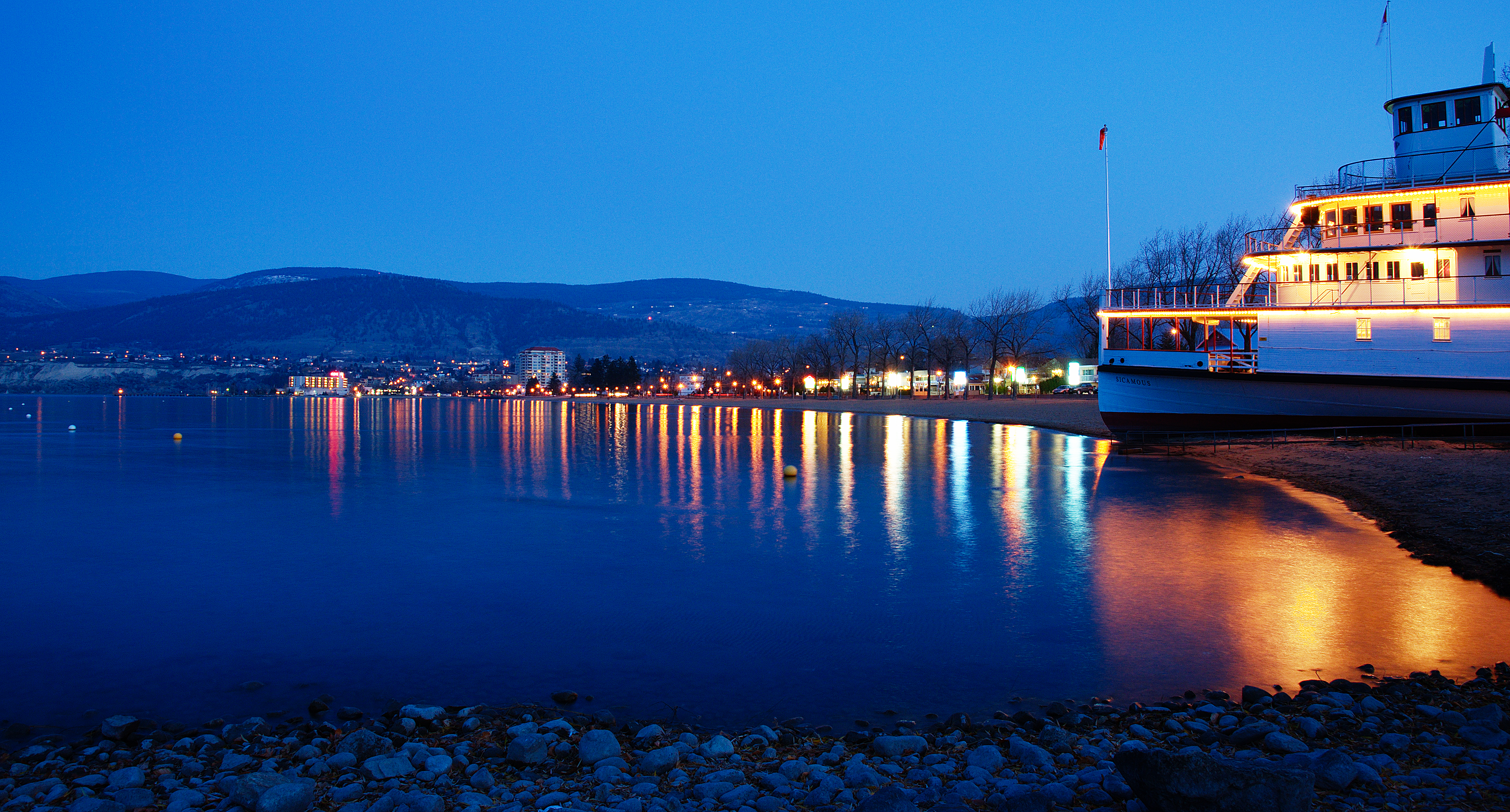
Penticton, British Columbia

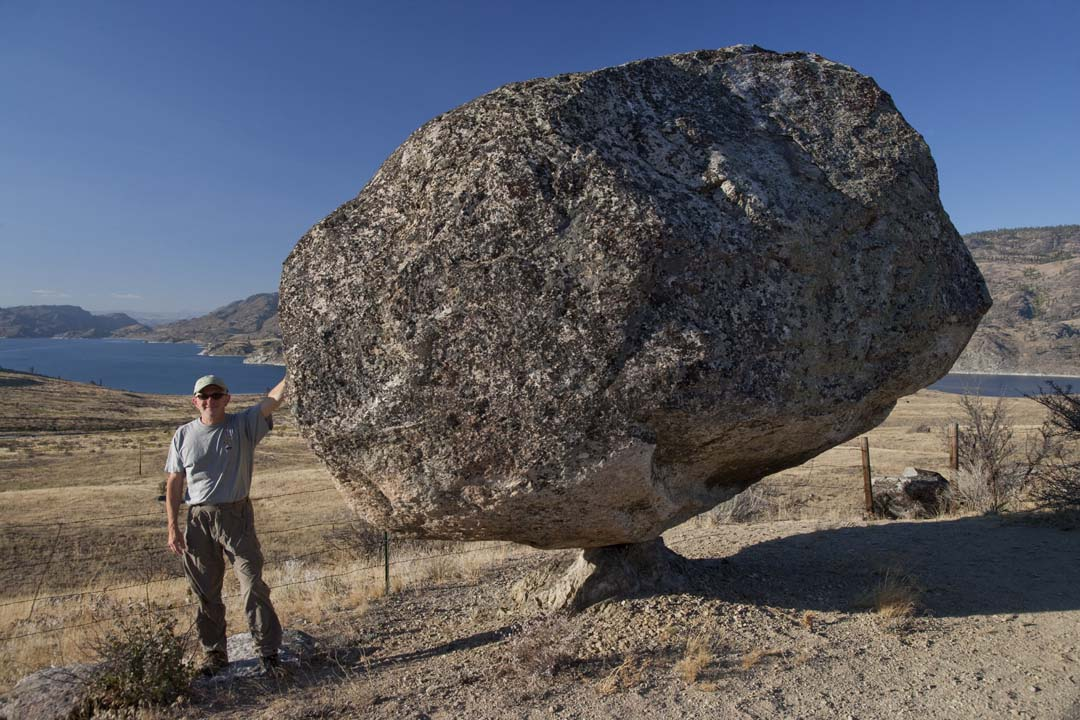
Omak, Washington

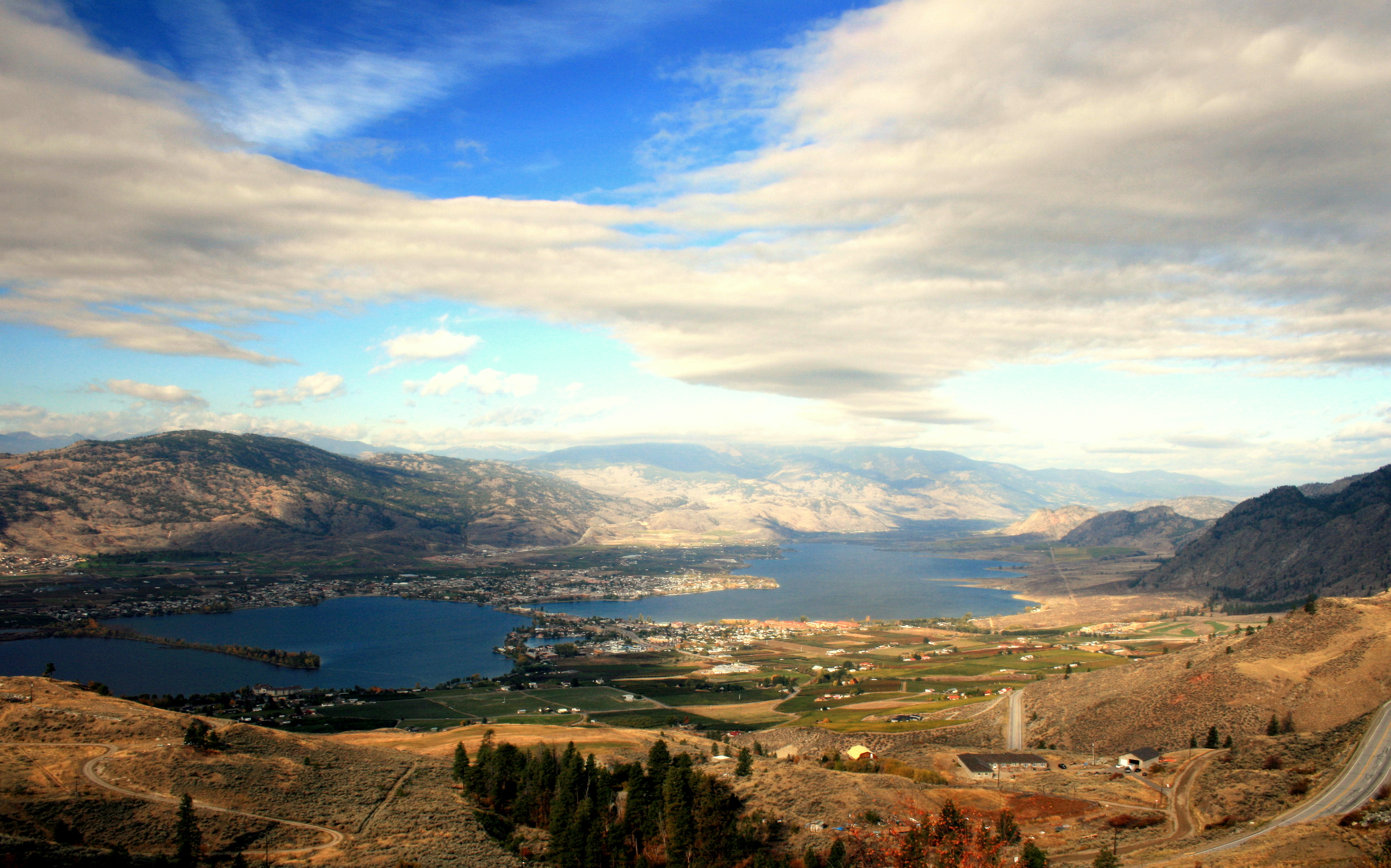
Osoyoos

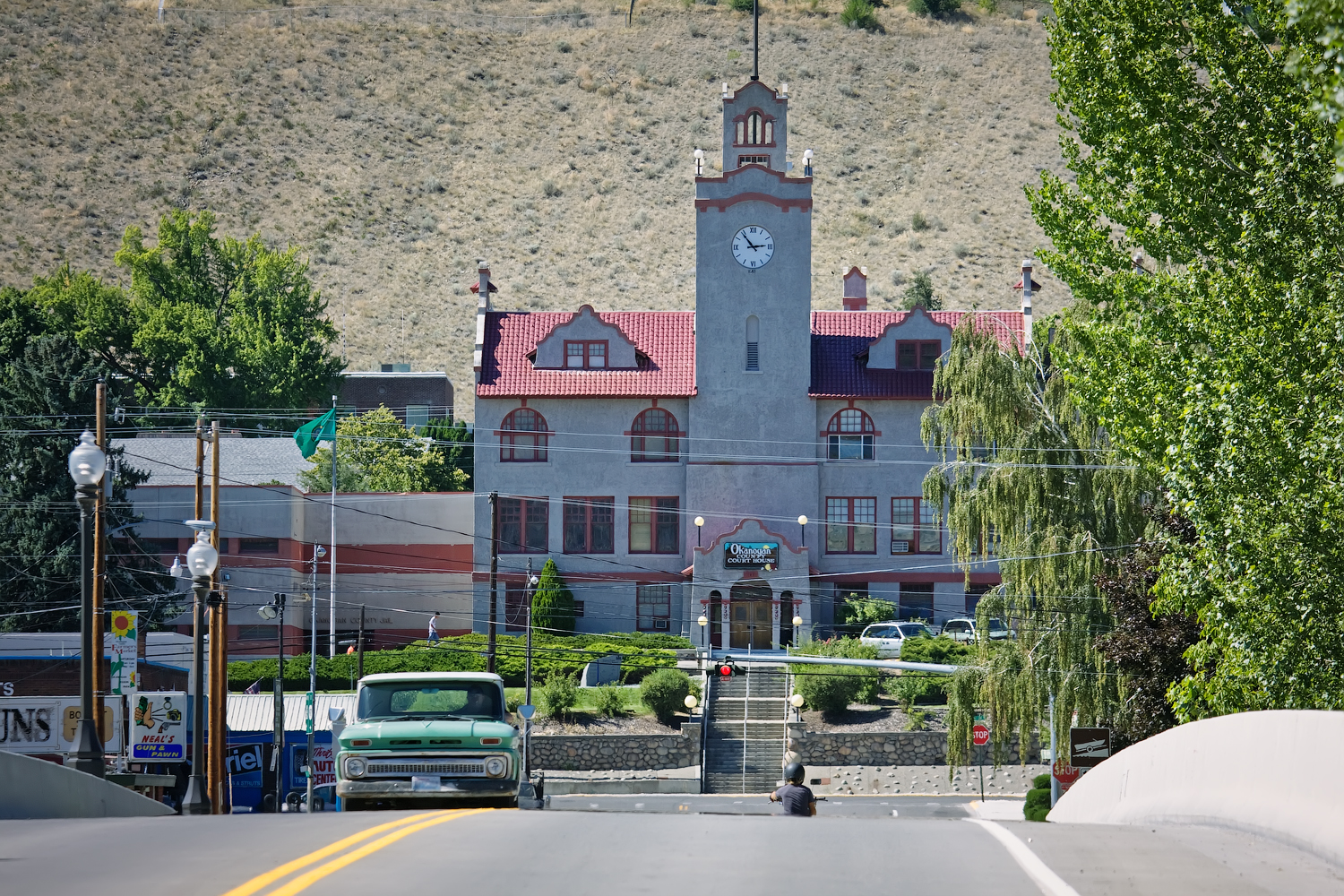
Okanogan, Washington

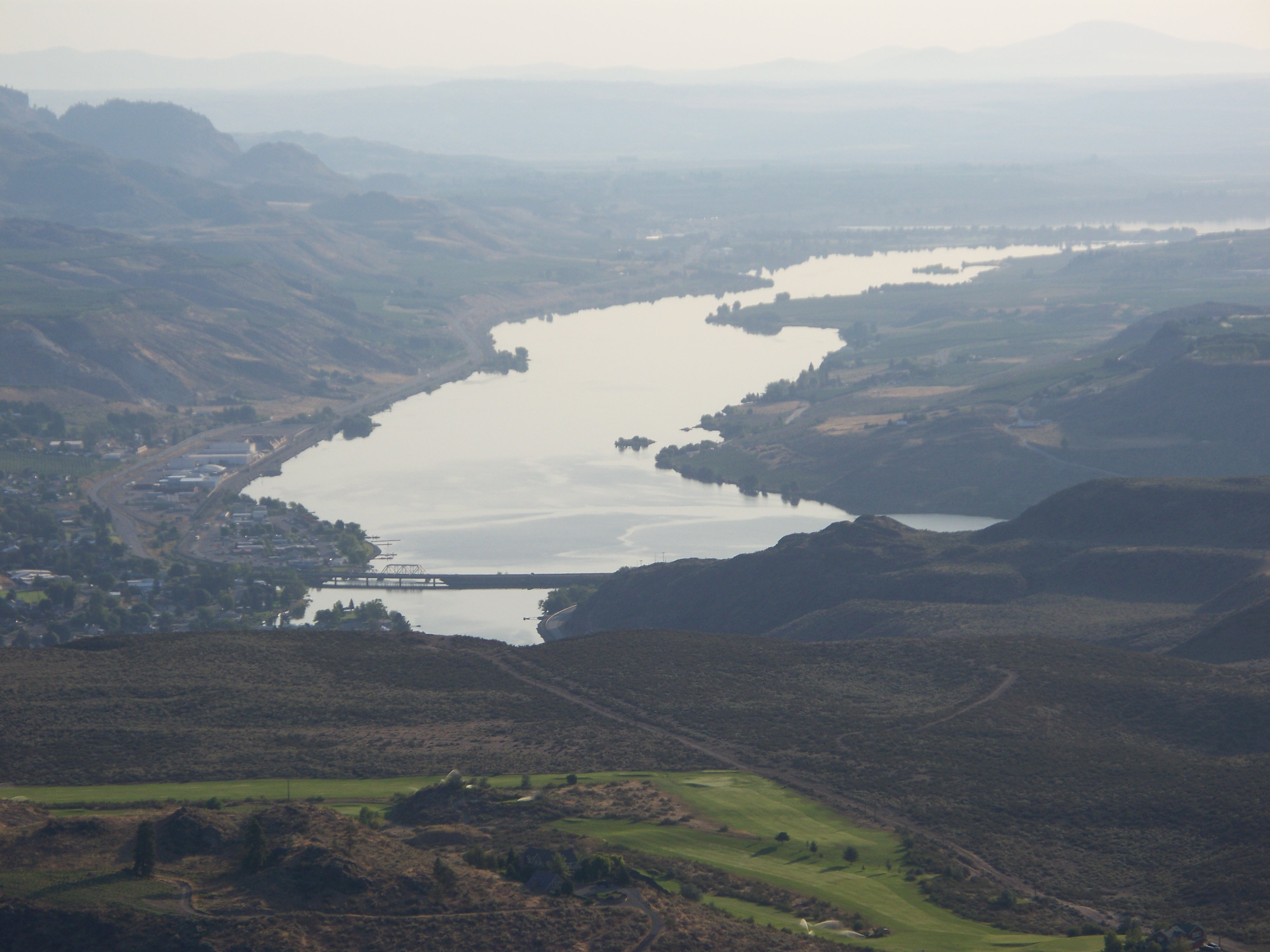
Pateros, Washington

Name	Type	Region	Population (2020)	Percent	Area (2011)	Density (2011) (Pop./km^{2})	Incorporated
Armstrong	City	North Okanagan	5,323	1.330%	5.24 km^{2} (2.0 sq mi)	920.0	1913
Barney's Junction	Designation	Ferry County	114	0.03%	0.30 km^{2} (0.1 sq mi)	1,452.7	—N/a
Barstow	Designation	Ferry County	66	0.02%	1.55 km^{2} (0.6 sq mi)	272.7	—N/a
Boyds	Designation	Ferry County	34	0.01%	0.51 km^{2} (0.2 sq mi)	452.4	—N/a
Brewster	City	Okanogan County	1,983	0.50%	3.08 km^{2} (1.2 sq mi)	769.0	1910
Bridgeport	City	Douglas County	2,141	0.54%	2.72 km^{2} (1.1 sq mi)	885.8	1910
Chelan	City	Chelan County	4,222	1.06%	16.45 km^{2} (6.4 sq mi)	238.8	1902
Conconully	Town	Okanogan County	193	0.05%	0.80 km^{2} (0.3 sq mi)	261.5	1908
Coldstream	District	North Okanagan	11,171	2.79%	67.25 km^{2} (26.0 sq mi)	155.6	1906
Coulee Dam	Town	Okanogan County	1,211	0.3%	2.02 km^{2} (0.8 sq mi)	588.8	1959
Curlew	Designation	Ferry County	105	0.03%	2.07 km^{2} (0.8 sq mi)	403.0	—N/a
Curlew Lake	Designation	Ferry County	512	0.13%	14.76 km^{2} (5.7 sq mi)	274.2	—N/a
Disautel	Designation	Okanogan County	47	0.01%	9.80 km^{2} (3.8 sq mi)	54.0	—N/a
Electric City	City	Grant County	956	0.24%	6.06 km^{2} (2.3 sq mi)	219.8	1950
Elmer City	Town	Okanogan County	239	0.06%	0.54 km^{2} (0.2 sq mi)	437.6	1947
Enderby	City	North Okanagan	3,028	0.76%	4.26 km^{2} (1.6 sq mi)	690.0	1905
Grand Coulee	City	Grant County	972	0.24%	3.34 km^{2} (1.3 sq mi)	320.6	1935
Inchelium	Designation	Ferry County	431	0.110%	68.80 km^{2} (26.6 sq mi)	6.0	—N/a
Kaleden	Designation	Okanagan-Similkameen	1,186	0.3%	4.32 km^{2} (1.7 sq mi)	283.6	—N/a
Keller	Designation	Ferry County	229	0.06%	15.28 km^{2} (5.9 sq mi)	63.7	—N/a
Kelowna	City	Central Okanagan	144,576	36.14%	211.82 km^{2} (81.8 sq mi)	553.8	1905
Lake Country	District	Central Okanagan	15,817	3.95%	122.19 km^{2} (47.2 sq mi)	95.8	1995
Loomis	Designation	Okanogan County	161	0.04%	2.20 km^{2} (0.8 sq mi)	72.0	—N/a
Lumby	Village	North Okanagan	2,063	0.52%	5.27 km^{2} (2.0 sq mi)	301.6	1955
Malott	Designation	Okanogan County	464	0.12%	1.80 km^{2} (0.7 sq mi)	685.0	—N/a
Methow	Designation	Okanogan County	92	0.02%	4.70 km^{2} (1.8 sq mi)	260.2	—N/a
Naramata	Designation	Okanagan-Similkameen	1,628	0.41%	7.99 km^{2} (3.1 sq mi)	206.2	—N/a
Nespelem	Town	Okanogan County	236	0.06%	0.49 km^{2} (0.2 sq mi)	479.6	1935
Nespelem Community	Designation	Okanogan County	283	0.07%	59.90 km^{2} (23.1 sq mi)	4.2	—N/a
North Omak	Designation	Okanogan County	651	0.16%	29.00 km^{2} (11.2 sq mi)	23.7	—N/a
Olalla	Designation	Okanagan-Similkameen	415	0.10%	0.49 km^{2} (0.2 sq mi)	826.3	—N/a
Oliver	Town	Okanagan-Similkameen	5,094	1.27%	4.88 km^{2} (1.9 sq mi)	990.0	1945
Okanagan Falls	Designation	Okanagan-Similkameen	2,266	0.57%	2.00 km^{2} (0.8 sq mi)	840.0	—N/a
Okanogan	City	Okanogan County	2,379	0.59%	5.20 km^{2} (2.0 sq mi)	505.3	1907
Omak	City	Okanogan County	4,860	1.22%	9.10 km^{2} (3.5 sq mi)	545.4	1911
Orient	Designation	Ferry County	75	0.02%	1.03 km^{2} (0.4 sq mi)	689.4	—N/a
Oroville	City	Okanogan County	1,795	0.45%	4.35 km^{2} (1.7 sq mi)	396.9	1908
Osoyoos	Town	Okanagan-Similkameen	5,556	1.39%	8.76 km^{2} (3.4 sq mi)	553.1	1946
Pateros	City	Okanogan County	593	0.15%	1.27 km^{2} (0.5 sq mi)	525.6	1913
Peachland	District	Central Okanagan	5,789	1.450%	15.75 km^{2} (6.1 sq mi)	330.2	1909
Penticton	City	Okanagan-Similkameen	36,885	9.22%	42.10 km^{2} (16.3 sq mi)	780.9	1908
Republic	City	Ferry County	992	0.25%	4.12 km^{2} (1.6 sq mi)	260.5	1900
Pine Grove	Designation	Ferry County	129	0.03%	1.29 km^{2} (0.5 sq mi)	697.2	—N/a
Riverside	Town	Okanogan County	329	0.08%	2.56 km^{2} (1.0 sq mi)	111.5	1913
Spallumcheen	District	North Okanagan	5,307	1.33%	255.77 km^{2} (98.8 sq mi)	19.8	1892
Summerland	District	Okanagan-Similkameen	12,042	3.01%	74.06 km^{2} (28.6 sq mi)	152.3	1906
Tonasket	City	Okanogan County	1,103	0.28%	2.07 km^{2} (0.8 sq mi)	498.1	1927
Torboy	Designation	Ferry County	43	0.01%	2.58 km^{2} (1.0 sq mi)	137.0	—N/a
Twin Lakes	Designation	Ferry County	99	0.02%	10.90 km^{2} (4.2 sq mi)	5.4	—N/a
Twisp	Town	Okanogan County	992	0.25%	3.06 km^{2} (1.2 sq mi)	300.7	1909
Vernon	City	North Okanagan	44,519	11.13%	95.76 km^{2} (37.0 sq mi)	398.4	1892
West Kelowna	City	Central Okanagan	36,078	7.72%	123.51 km^{2} (47.7 sq mi)	250.1	2015
Winthrop	Town	Okanogan County	504	0.130%	2.43 km^{2} (0.9 sq mi)	161.8	1924

== Government ==
Population estimates from 2021 and 2020 released by Statistics Canada and United States Census Bureau indicated that there were over 400,000 residents. The American portion covers 10 percent of the population. Federally, the Canadian portion of the Okanagan Country is part of the British Columbia Southern Interior electoral district, while the American portion is part of Washington's 4th congressional district. The Okanagan Country is part of the North Okanagan, Central Okanagan, Okanagan-Similkameen regional districts, and the Okanogan and Ferry counties; however, minimal portions of Grant and Douglas counties also lie within the divided region.
