= Family Tradition =

Family traditions are attitudes and ideals inherited from one's parents.

Family Tradition may also refer to:

- Anderson's Grocery, A Family Tradition, more frequently called Anderson's Grocery, a grocery store in Republic, Washington
- Family Tradition (album), by Hank Williams, Jr. (1979)
- "Family Tradition" (Hank Williams, Jr. song)
- "Family Tradition" (Senses Fail song)
- "Family Tradition", an episode of The Wild Thornberrys
