= Twin Lakes, Washington =

- Census-designated place
- Location within Washington (state) Location within the United States
- Coordinates: 48°15′44″N 118°22′05″W
- Country: United States
- State: Washington
- County: Ferry

Area
  - Total: 4.2 sq mi (10.8 km^{2})
  - Land: 4.2 sq mi (10.8 km^{2})
  - Water: 0 sq mi (0.0 km^{2})
- Elevation: 2,592 ft (790 m)

Population (2010)
  - Total: 59
  - Density: 14/sq mi (5.5/km^{2})
- Time zone: Pacific
- ZIP Code: 99138
- Area code(s): 360, 564
- GNIS feature ID: 2585047

Twin Lakes is a census-designated place in Ferry County, Washington, United States. As of the 2020 census, Twin Lakes had a population of 99.

== Demographics ==
Historical population
Census	Pop.	Note	%±
2010	59		—
2020	99		67.8%
U.S. Decennial Census; 2000 2010

Twin Lakes was listed as a census designated place in the 2010 U.S. census.

=== Racial and ethnic composition ===
Twin Lakes CDP, Washington – Racial and ethnic composition Note: the US Census treats Hispanic/Latino as an ethnic category. This table excludes Latinos from the racial categories and assigns them to a separate category. Hispanics/Latinos may be of any race.
Race / Ethnicity (NH = Non-Hispanic)	Pop 2010	Pop 2020	% 2010	% 2020
White alone (NH)	24	52	40.68%	52.53%
Black or African American alone (NH)	0	0	0.00%	0.00%
Native American or Alaska Native alone (NH)	33	45	55.93%	45.45%
Asian alone (NH)	0	0	0.00%	0.00%
Native Hawaiian or Pacific Islander alone (NH)	0	0	0.00%	0.00%
Other race alone (NH)	0	0	0.00%	0.00%
Mixed race or Multiracial (NH)	2	2	3.39%	2.02%
Hispanic or Latino (any race)	0	0	0.00%	0.00%
Total	59	99	100.00%	100.00%

=== 2010 census ===
In 2010, it had a population of 59. The census reported that 36 of the inhabitants were male, and 23 were female.

== Geography ==
Twin Lakes is located in southeastern Ferry County on the east side of North and South Twin Lakes. The lakes' outlet is Cornstalk Creek, which leaves the north end of North Twin Lake and flows east to the Columbia River at Inchelium. Bridge Creek Road leads east 8 miles (13 km) from North Twin Lake to Inchelium and west across Gold Mountain Ridge 22 miles (35 km) to Washington State Route 21 in the Sanpoil River valley.

According to the U.S. Census Bureau, the Twin Lakes CDP has a total area of 4.2 square miles (10.8 km^{2}), all of it land.
