= Inchelium School District =

School district in Washington, United States

Inchelium School District No. 70 is a public school district in Ferry County, Washington and serves 1,202 residents in the town of Inchelium and part of the Colville Indian Reservation.

In March 2011, the district had an enrollment of 196 students.

== Schools ==
=== Secondary schools ===
- Inchelium High School
- Inchelium Alternative High School

=== Primary schools ===
- Inchelium Middle School
- Inchelium Elementary School
