= Impach, Washington =

- Unincorporated community
- Location within Washington (state) Location within the United States
- Coordinates: 48°17′18″N 118°14′12″W
- Country: United States
- State: Washington
- County: Ferry
- Elevation: 1,795 ft (547 m)
- Time zone: UTC-8 (Pacific (PST))
  - Summer (DST): UTC-7 (PDT)
- ZIP code: 99138
- Area code: 509
- GNIS feature ID: 1521147

Impach, Washington is an unincorporated populated place in east central Ferry County, Washington on the Colville Indian Reservation. It is located within the Inchelium CDP.

== Etymology ==
The community's name means "white lake" in the Salishan dialect of the San Poil tribe, likely a reference to Camille Lake located about 1.25 miles (2 km) north.

== History ==
Historically, Impach has been the site of traditional Native American dance ceremonies by members of the confederated tribes. Gold was discovered in Ferry County in 1896 and several gold mines operated in the Impach area as late as the 1950s, including the nearby Gold Twenty Mine which produced lode gold, lead, and silver. During the early 1930s, a predecessor of the Works Progress Administration established a small logging operation in Impach, which brought some unemployed families to the area at the height of the Great Depression. A United States post office operated at Impach, Washington, from 1922 to 1954. The scenic valley is primarily grazing land today.

== Geography ==
Impach is located at the mouth of a long coulee in rural Seylor Valley approximately 3 miles (5 km) west of Inchelium on County Highway 2, also known as Bridge Creek Road. Two prominent summits, Stranger Mountain, 3,021 feet (921 m), and Monument Butte, 2,057 feet (627 m), overlook Impach less than 2 miles (3 km) to the south.
