= Covada, Washington =

Unincorporated community in Washington, United States

- Unincorporated community
- Location within Washington (state) Location within the United States
- Coordinates: 48°13′14″N 118°12′32″W
- Country: United States
- State: Washington
- County: Ferry
- Established: 1905
- Elevation: 1,880 ft (570 m)
- Time zone: UTC-8 (Pacific (PST))
  - Summer (DST): UTC-7 (PDT)
- Area code: 509
- GNIS feature ID: 1510892

Covada is an unincorporated community in Ferry County, in the U.S. state of Washington.

== History ==
A post office called Covada was established in 1905, and remained in operation until 1954. The name is an acronym of several nearby mines, namely Columbia, Orin, Verin, Ada, Dora, and Alice.
