= Ferry County Carousel =

Coordinates: 48°39′02″N 118°41′33″W

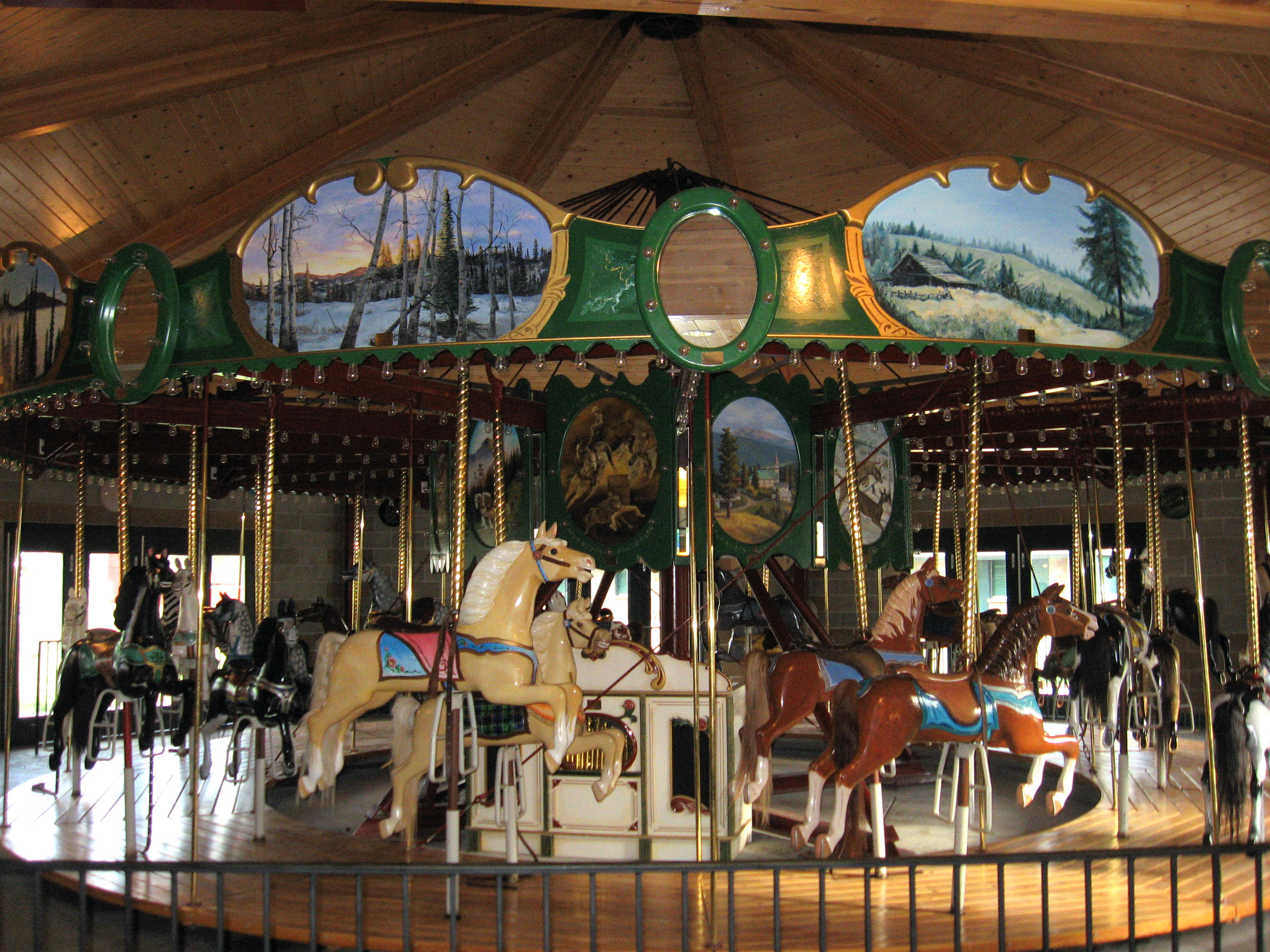
- View of the unlit carousel

Ferry County Fairgrounds
- Status: Operating
- Opening date: 1958

Tacoma, Washington
- Area: Tacoma, WA or a Tacoma Carnaval
- Status: Removed
- Opening date: unknown
- Closing date: 1957

Ride statistics
- Attraction type: traveling "country fair" merry-go-round
- Designer: Armitage Herschell Company or Herschell Spillman Company
- Model: Carousel
- Theme: Ferry County life
- Music: Recorded music
- Vehicles: 24 Horses & 1 Zebra
- Riders per vehicle: 1

The Ferry County Carousel is an operational wooden carousel located 3 mi (4.8 km) east of the town of Republic, Washington on the Ferry County Fairgrounds. This carousel features 24 horses in two rows and is fitted with a jumping mechanism. The Ferry County Carousel is one of only seven classic wooden carousels in Washington state and possibly the oldest.

== The carousel ==
This all wood carousel consists of 24 horses mounted in two rows on a traveling "country fair" style mechanism. There are three distinct carving periods to be found among the horses while all of the horses feature detachable "pillows" or saddles. Two of the styles are differentiated by the mane carving styles, and are traceable back to the Armitage Herschell Company and the Herschell Spillman Company, while two horses are thought to have been carved by Charles Dare. One of the horses was missing from the carousel for nearly 15 years. It was thought lost until being discovered in the garage of a house which a person had just bought. It was in very poor condition upon return and was sent to a carver in Missoula, Montana for intensive restoration. While some of the horses are painted to resemble common breeds, many are named and painted in remembrance of horses known or owned by the sponsors. The horses range in color from Appaloosa and Red Sorrel to an African Paint. The breeds are as diverse as the colors and include a Morgan horse, wild mustang, and even a Zebra. The zebra, "Echo babe", is the carousel's spare, and only new, "horse". Sponsored by the local mining company, she was donated by a Tacoma carver, Joanne Sessions, so the children could have a zebra to ride. The horses "Mary Jane" and "Frosty" are thought to have been carved by Charles Dane while he was under contract to Armitage Herschell.

At the time of the restoration the Keller, Washington 4-H, having been saving money for a project for several years, decided to sponsor one of the horses. Having only $400 of the needed $1,000, the club successfully petitioned the Colville Confederated tribes for the rest. In honor of that contribution, painter Sandy Shiflett painted "Running Brave" as an Appaloosa mustang with traditional feathers in the mane and war paint on the rump. She designed the blanket with a 4-H Clover on the saddle blanket and a sunflower carving on the saddle in honor of the Keller area.

Each of the running boards was painted by a local artist and features a different landscape from around the county. The back panels are painted with scenes of wildlife, country life, and history, and include one scene by well known western artist Everett Russell, a Ferry County resident. To include even the children, the "This Little Light of Mine" project allowed one to sponsor one of 540 lights on the machine for $10 in the name of a child, and a memorial board was painted by a Republic High School senior, showing the sponsors and where to find the specific light on the carousel itself.

Whether this carousel originally had an organ is unknown, and music is provided currently by a CD player donated from Spokane and housed behind a carved facade donated by a wood carver also from Spokane.

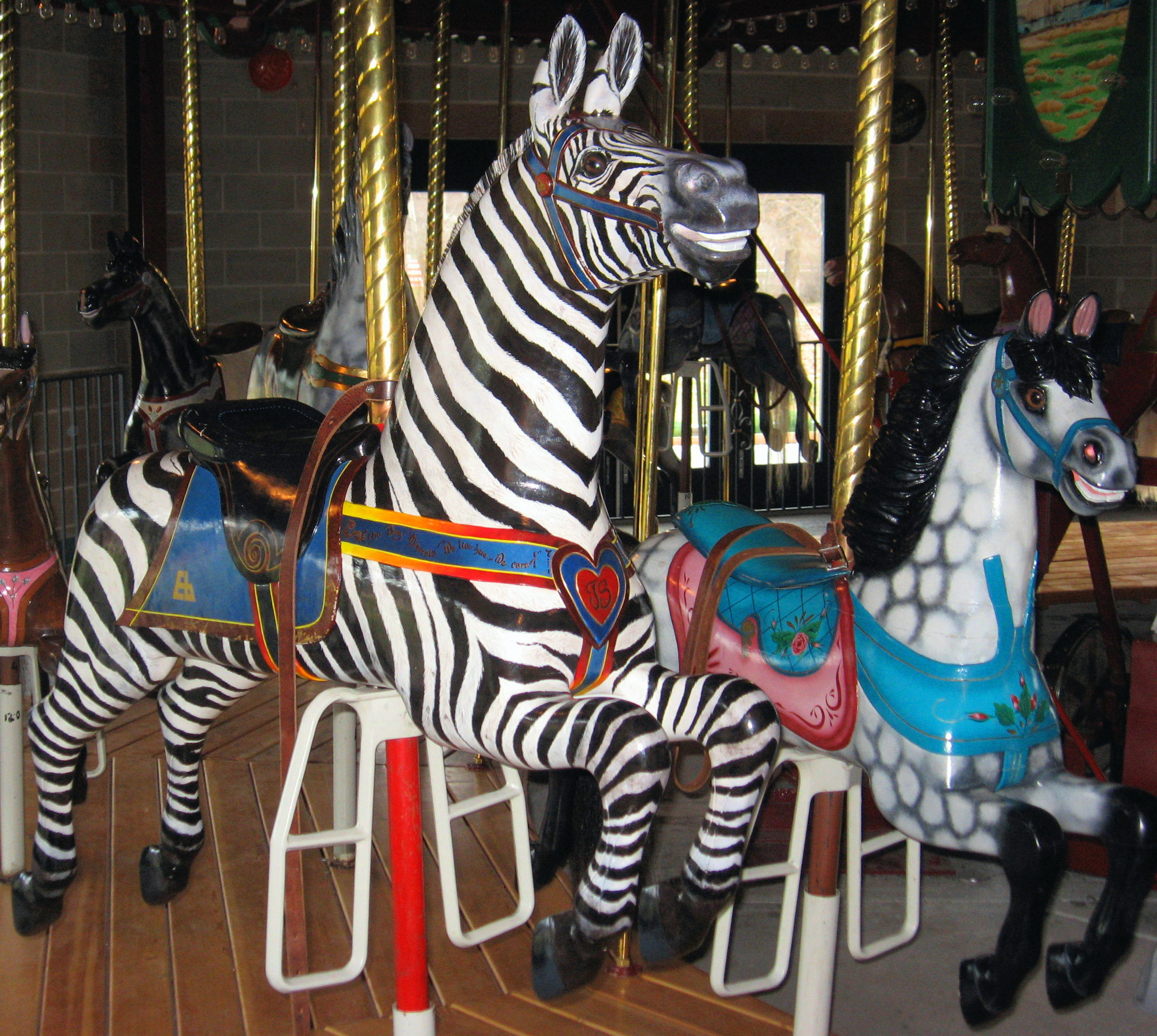
"Echo Babe" and "Frosty"

== Early history ==
While the exact date this carousel was built is not known, the simple styles of the horses show it to be from the beginning of the golden age of carousel building in America, between 1890 and 1900. Constructed in the style common for transportable "Country fair" the carousel features two rows of twelve horses each. The carousel was made by either the Armitage Herschell Company or the Herschell Spillman Company. During the golden age of carousels an estimated 2,000 to 3,000 carousels were built by a number of different companies. Of that estimated number only 208 were listed in the National Carousel Associations 2000 census. The original owner and destination of the carousel is unknown. Belly mounts on the horses indicate the carousel was originally track driven, but the track mechanism was replaced at some point with a 1935 mechanism built by Hatfield Engineering, when the entire carousel was refitted to the jumping format present today.

== Purchase and transport ==
At some point the carousel was purchased by a carnival or the City of Tacoma, Washington where it remained until 1958. In that year a group of farmers from Ferry County located the carousel in Tacoma. The group applied for and obtained a $2,000 loan for the purchase of the machine from the Tacoma owner. The entire machine was then transported back to the Ferry County fairgrounds on the bed of a wheat truck. At this time the carousel was repainted and received an art deco makeover, including metal running boards and neon lights. This marked the last major changes until the mid-1990s.

== Rehabilitation ==
Close to 30 years exposure to hot summer and freezing winter conditions, common in Ferry County, took their toll on the carousel and in 1993 county residents approached the county and worked with the county government to restore it. This also lead to an agreement by the county never to sell the carousel outside the county and the formation of the Merry-Go-Round Friends Committee to oversee the project. The project was estimated to cost approximately $30,000; $1,000 for each of the horses and an additional $6,000 for the machinery. In the span of a year the committee raised nearly half of the total cost. Every part of the carousel, from the horses to the backboards to the individual lights open for sponsorship from the community. Each sponsor of a horse was also allowed to name that horse. In addition to the monetary support, numerous local artists donated time and skill to the repainting and rehabilitation of the horses and scenery. These local volunteers were assisted by carousel enthusiasts from around the United States.

== Housing ==
Another project was started in 1995 to further preserve the carousel for future generations. Coinciding with a visit from officials of the National Carousel Association a new committee was formed to oversee the construction of a permanent building around the carousel. A number of parties donated significant funds to the project including $80,000 raised in the community alone. The construction was facilitated by the Curlew Job Corps building-trades classes and a week of work was donated by crews from Colville and Seattle to finish the project before winter. The 5,500-square-foot (510 m^{2}) building consists of an octagonal room for the carousel, a meeting room, restrooms, and a full kitchen. A large stained glass piece featuring a white carousel horse with black saddle, created by leaded glass artist Bonnie Schmidt, was donated for the restoration project and incorporated into the carousel room.
