= Barney's Junction, Washington =

- Census-designated place
- Location within Washington (state) Location within the United States
- Coordinates: 48°37′24″N 118°07′34″W
- Country: United States
- State: Washington
- County: Ferry

Area
  - Total: 0.26 sq mi (0.67 km^{2})
  - Land: 0.26 sq mi (0.67 km^{2})
  - Water: 0 sq mi (0.0 km^{2})
- Elevation: 1,362 ft (415 m)

Population (2010)
  - Total: 146
  - Density: 561/sq mi (216.6/km^{2})
- Time zone: Pacific
- ZIP Code: 99141
- Area code(s): 360, 564
- GNIS feature ID: 2807177

Barney's Junction is a census-designated place in Ferry County, Washington, in the United States. As of the 2020 census, Barney's Junction had a population of 114.

== Demographics ==
Historical population
Census	Pop.	Note	%±
2010	146		—
2020	114		−21.9%
U.S. Decennial Census; 2000 2010

Barney's Junction first appeared as a census designated place in the 2010 U.S. census.

=== Racial and ethnic composition ===
Barney's Junction CDP, Washington – Racial and ethnic composition Note: the US Census treats Hispanic/Latino as an ethnic category. This table excludes Latinos from the racial categories and assigns them to a separate category. Hispanics/Latinos may be of any race.
Race / Ethnicity (NH = Non-Hispanic)	Pop 2010	Pop 2020	% 2010	% 2020
White alone (NH)	129	96	88.36%	84.21%
Black or African American alone (NH)	0	0	0.00%	0.00%
Native American or Alaska Native alone (NH)	3	0	2.05%	0.00%
Asian alone (NH)	0	0	0.00%	0.00%
Native Hawaiian or Pacific Islander alone (NH)	0	0	0.00%	0.00%
Other race alone (NH)	0	2	0.00%	1.75%
Mixed race or Multiracial (NH)	4	14	2.74%	12.28%
Hispanic or Latino (any race)	10	2	6.85%	1.75%
Total	146	114	100.00%	100.00%

=== 2010 census ===
In 2010, it had a population of 146. The tally concluded a gender listing of 44 males and 102 females.

== Geography ==
Barney's Junction is located in eastern Ferry County on the west side of the Columbia River. U.S. Route 395 crosses the river at the north end of the CDP, leading east 3.5 miles (5.6 km) to Kettle Falls in Stevens County. To the north US 395 leads 28 miles (45 km) to the Canadian border at Laurier. Washington State Route 20 intersects US 395 at Barney's Junction, and leads generally west 40 miles (64 km) over Sherman Creek Pass in Colville National Forest to Republic, the Ferry County seat.

According to the U.S. Census Bureau, the Barney's Junction CDP has a total area of 0.26 square miles (0.67 km^{2}), all of it land.
