= Boyds, Washington =

- Census-designated place
- Location within Washington (state) Location within the United States
- Coordinates: 48°43′28″N 118°07′56″W
- Country: United States
- State: Washington
- County: Ferry

Area
  - Total: 0.19 sq mi (0.50 km^{2})
  - Land: 0.19 sq mi (0.50 km^{2})
  - Water: 0 sq mi (0.0 km^{2})
- Elevation: 1,408 ft (429 m)

Population (2010)
  - Total: 34
  - Density: 175/sq mi (67.5/km^{2})
- Time zone: UTC-8 (Pacific (PST))
  - Summer (DST): UTC-7 (PDT)
- Area code: 509
- GNIS feature ID: 2631347
- FIPS code: 53-07485

Boyds is an unincorporated community and census-designated place (CDP) in Ferry County, Washington, United States. Boyds is located along U.S. Route 395 at the north end of the Lake Roosevelt National Recreation Area on the west side of the Kettle River, which serves as a boundary with Stevens County. The community of Barstow is 4 miles (6 km) to the north, and the city of Kettle Falls is 10 miles (16 km) to the south on US 395. Boyds was formerly assigned the ZIP code 99107. As of the 2020 census, Boyds had a population of 34.

== Demographics ==
Historical population
Census	Pop.	Note	%±
2010	34		—
2020	34		0.0%
U.S. Decennial Census; 2000 2010

Boyds first appeared as a census designated place in the 2010 U.S. census.

=== Racial and ethnic composition ===
Boyds CDP, Washington – Racial and ethnic composition Note: the US Census treats Hispanic/Latino as an ethnic category. This table excludes Latinos from the racial categories and assigns them to a separate category. Hispanics/Latinos may be of any race.
Race / Ethnicity (NH = Non-Hispanic)	Pop 2010	Pop 2020	% 2010	% 2020
White alone (NH)	22	32	64.71%	94.12%
Black or African American alone (NH)	0	0	0.00%	0.00%
Native American or Alaska Native alone (NH)	7	0	20.59%	0.00%
Asian alone (NH)	0	0	0.00%	0.00%
Native Hawaiian or Pacific Islander alone (NH)	0	0	0.00%	0.00%
Other race alone (NH)	0	0	0.00%	0.00%
Mixed race or Multiracial (NH)	1	2	2.94%	5.88%
Hispanic or Latino (any race)	4	0	11.76%	0.00%
Total	34	34	100.00%	100.00%
