= Sanpoil River =

Sanpoil River Sans Poil Creek
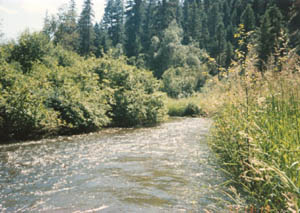

Location
- Country: United States
- Region: Okanagan Highlands
- State: Washington
- Counties: Ferry and Okanogan County
- Towns: Republic and Keller

Physical characteristics
- Source: Copper Butte
  - location: 48.7025°N 118.4656°W
  - coordinates: 48°38′54″N 118°38′12″W
  - elevation: 7,135 ft (2,175 m)
- Mouth: Sanpoil Arm, Columbia River
  - coordinates: 47°56′55″N 118°40′50″W
  - elevation: 1,293 ft (394 m)
- Length: 59 mi (95 km)
- Basin size: 981 mi^{2} (2,540 km^{2})
- Discharge
  - location: mouth, Sanpoil Arm, mile 615.5 Lake Roosevelt

Basin features
- Tributaries
  - left: Dick Creek, John Tom Creek, Silver Creek, Copper Creek, Alice Creek, Cow Creek, Iron Creek, Louie Creek, Bridge Creek, Thirtymile Creek, Deadhorse Creek, Twentyfive Mile Creek, Twentythree Mile Creek, Twentyonemile Creek, Seventeenmile Creek, Thirteenmile Creek, Ninemile Creek, Mcmann Creek, Camel Creek, O'Brian Creek
  - right: Manilla Creek, Meadow Creek, Jack Creek, Brush Creek. Empire Creek, Lime Creek, Cache Creek, McAllister Creek, Capoose Creek, Cub Creek, South Nanamkin Creek, North Nanamkin Creek, Bear Creek, Anderson Creek, Nineteenmile Creek, West Fork Sanpoil River, Tenmile Creek, Sunset Creek, Gold Creek, Scatter Creek, Golden Harvest Creek, Granite Creek

The Sanpoil River (also spelled San Poil) is a tributary of the Columbia River, in the U.S. state of Washington. The river is named for the Sanpoil, the Interior Salish people who live along the river course. The name is from the Okanagan term [snpʕʷílx], meaning "people of the gray country", or "gray as far as one can see".

== Course ==
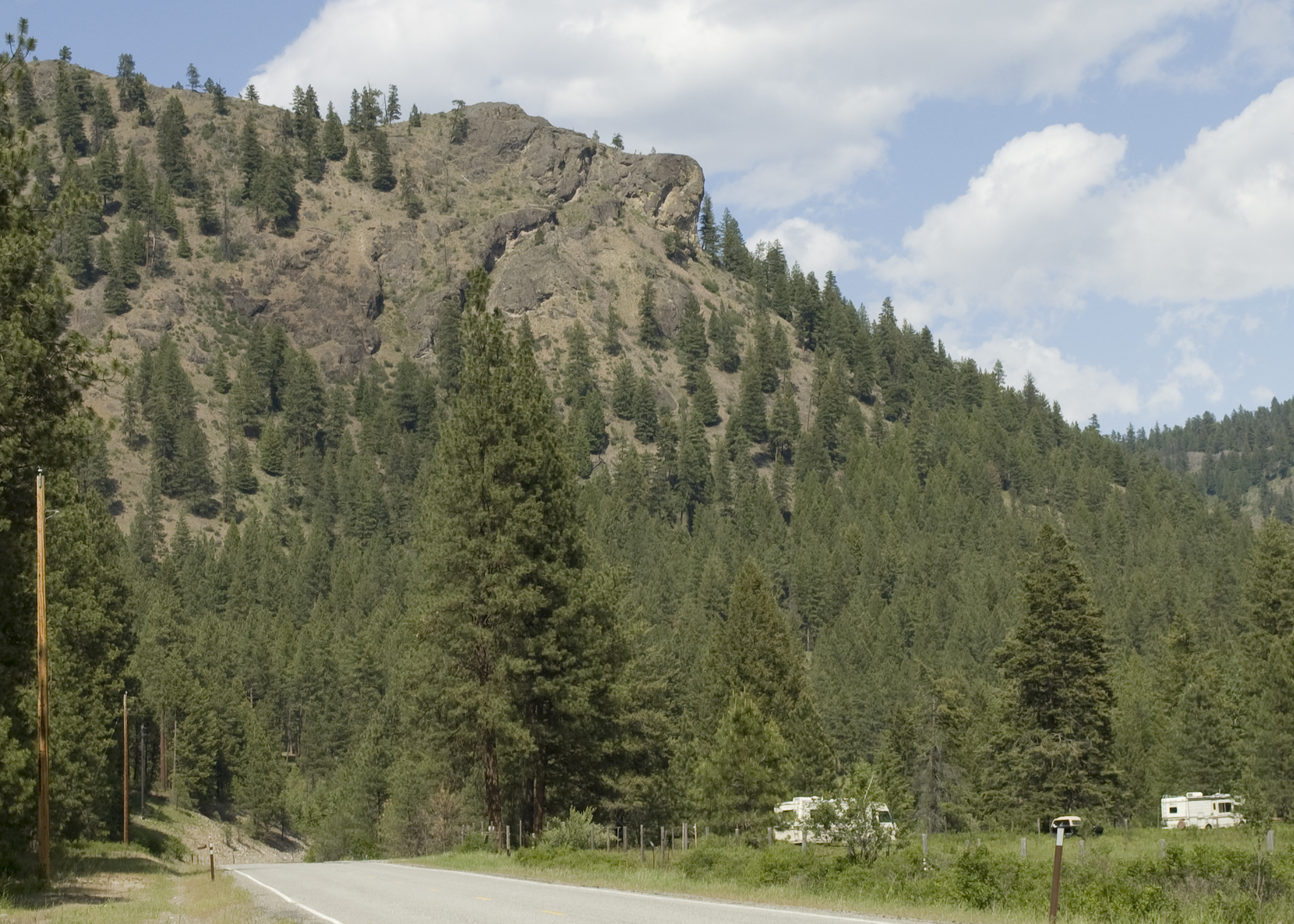
A glacially scoured hill in the Sanpoil River Valley, along State Route 21

The Sanpoil River originates in the Kettle River Range of northeast central Washington, as a confluence of the North Fork Sanpoil and South Fork Sanpoil rivers. It flows west into the Curlew Lake valley (south of Curlew Lake itself) and turns south at Torboy where it enters Sanpoil Lake. After flowing out of Sanpoil Lake it is joined by O'Brien Creek near Pine Grove and flows west again through the Ferry County Fairgrounds to the main Sanpoil Valley where it again turns south. Just after turning south below Republic, it is joined by Granite Creek from the west. The rest of the course flows south through the Colville National Forest, Okanogan–Wenatchee National Forest, and the Colville Indian Reservation. After entering the reservation the river receives its main tributary, the West Fork Sanpoil River. It then receives a number of smaller tributaries such as Twenty-one Mile Creek, Twenty-three Mile Creek, and Thirty Mile Creek. Historically the Sanpoil River basin was possibly connected to the Curlew Lake basin, however anthropogenic changes during the early 1900s redirected the northern water flow from the Sanpoil river basin into the Curlew Lake Basin via Lake Roberta and on north to the Kettle River.

The Sanpoil River discharges into Franklin D. Roosevelt Lake (Lake Roosevelt), the impounded Columbia River above Grand Coulee Dam. The dam flooded the last twelve miles of the Sanpoil River as well. This part of Lake Roosevelt is called the Sanpoil Arm.

== Geology ==
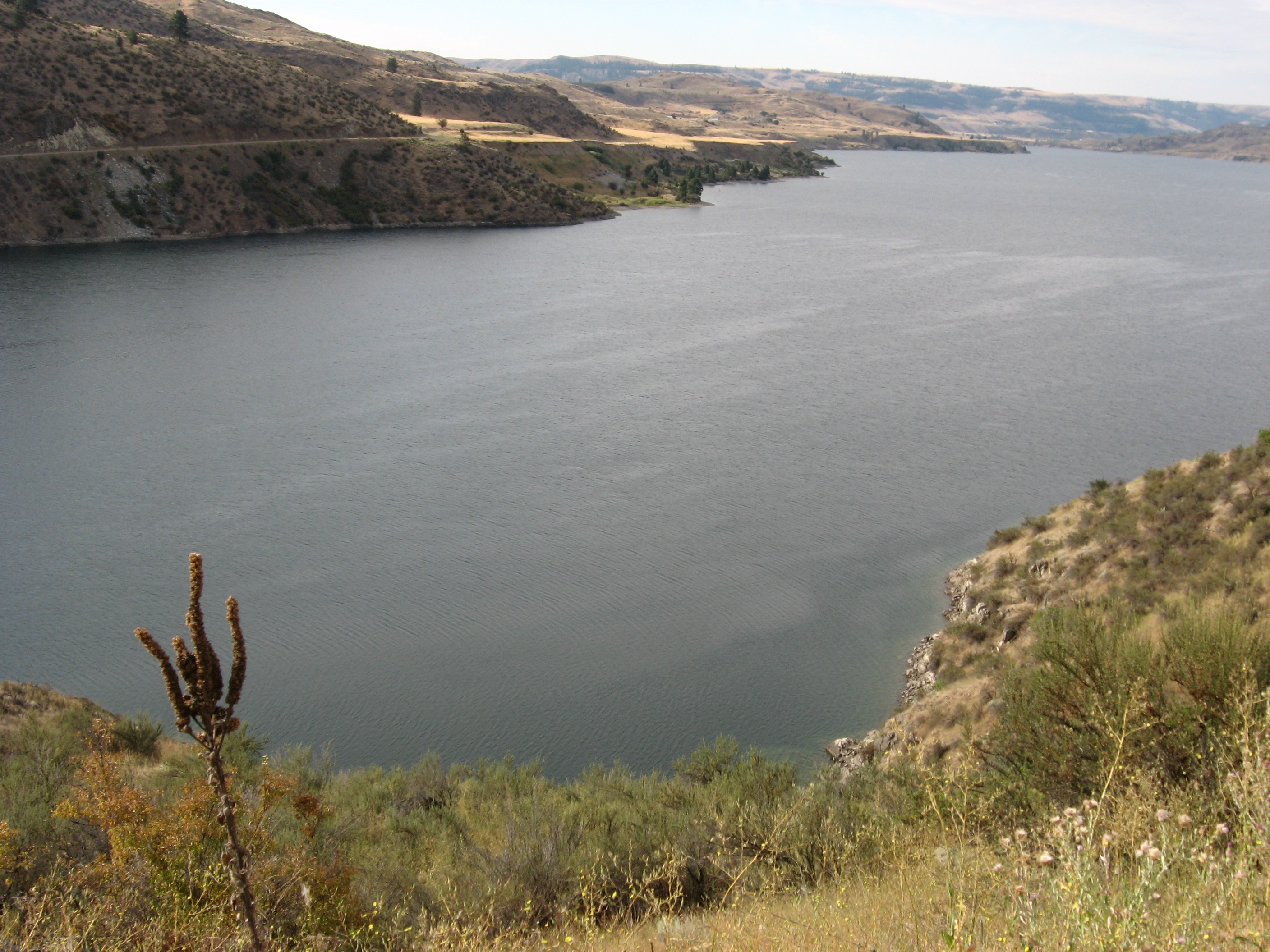
The Sanpoil Arm, south of Keller, showing terracing of Glacial Lake Columbia

The Sanpoil river runs south between two distinct geologic provinces, the Kootenai Arc and the Okanogan microcontinent. Both of these provinces are overlain in the southern reach of the Sanpoil by the Miocene age Columbia River basalts. The lower river course, to a point north of Manila Creek, were notably marked by cyclical inundation from Glacial Lake Columbia over a period of at least 900 years during the Fraser Glaciation. Concurrently the upper river valley north of the glacial lake area, was covered by ice by the Cordilleran ice sheets Okanogan lobe, which produced the topography seen in the Republic area today. At maximum extent, the lobe sent the Sanpoil sublobe down the upper Sanpoil river valley to a point somewhere between Empire Creek and Manila Creek. It has been suggested that Glacial Lake Columbia maintained a highstand for up to two centuries at about 15,350 14C yr BP.

Some placer gold is known from the lower river system, with reports of small amounts at the confluence of the West fork Sanpoil and Sanpoil and additional reports along the courses of Strawberry and Gold Creeks. The richest gold deposits are from the upper river valley, with alluvial gold found in the Granite Creek, a tributary of the Sanpoil west of Republic. The Republic Mining District was centered in the upper river basin, with both placer and underground mining operations occurring from 1896 though the early 1900s. Several ore mills were in operation on or near tributaries of the Sanpoil, using mercury plate amalgamation and MacArthur-Forrest cyanide leaching processes.

The Sanpoil Volcanics are named in reference to the river, as the type locality for the formation is an exposure along the river near Republic.

== Fish fauna ==
The river system hosts a mixture of riverine and lake fish, resulting from the long mouth area formed by the Sanpoil arm of Lake Roosevelt. Before construction of the hydroelectric dams on the Columbia River, notably Grand Coulee Dam in 1941, the Sanpoil basin hosted runs of anadromous salmon and Steelhead trout, along with Pacific lamprey, but the runs have gone extinct due to the lack of a fish ladder at Grand Coulee. The lost runs include confirmed Chinook salmon populations, and was within the known range of coho, chum, pink, and sockeye salmon runs. Native salmonid family species that are still present in the river system or itinerant visitors from Lake Roosevelt include mountain whitefish, cutthroat trout, rainbow trout, kokanee salmon, bull trout. In August 2019 100 "naive adult" Chinook salmon were released in three groups into the Sanpoil River by the Colville Tribal Fish and Wildlife Department. This was an effort to begin repopulation of the species almost 70 years after the historic runs were killed by completion of Grand Coulee Dam. The salmon were born and raised in the Wells fish hatchery, and do not have a instinctual connection to a specific stream or river for spawning. As a result, in the fall of 2020 the mature adults returned to the Sanpoil River system to spawn.

There are several native carp species including chiselmouth, longnosed dace, peamouth, speckled dace, and the predatory northern pikeminnow. Native suckers include the bridgelip, largescale, and longnose sucker are recorded from the river. A single native minnow, the redside shiner, burbot, three species of sculpin, the mottled, paiute, and prickly, and a landlocked white sturgeon population are all part of the fish fauna.

There are other possible natives to the river, the mountain sucker, slimy shorthead and torrent sculpin plus the three-spined stickleback, all of which have ranges possibly including the Sanpoil basin. However, none of these species have been officially been recorded as present.

The populations of cutthroat trout found in the West fork Sanpoil, along with Gold lake and its tributaries are suggested to not be relictual native populations, but possibly have origins dating to historic fish stocking activity. In contrast, a number of streams in the basin host genetically pure populations of the Columbia River redband trout, a subspecies of rainbow trout.

There are also a number of introduced fish species that have populations in the river, including the salominds brook and brown trout, the lake whitefish, the cyprinid common carp and the tench. Sportfish from the sunfish family including black and white crappie, plus largemouth and smallmouth bass, along with the perch family walleye have been established over the years. Possibly due to use as live bait or a forage fish, yellow perch are also present.

Relatively low numbers of adfluvial wild rainbow trout and hatchery-released kokanee salmon return to the Sanpoil River from Lake Roosevelt. Smallmouth bass and walleye, two nonindigenous predators that stage at the river/lake interface during the juvenile migration season, are thought to consume large numbers of these species. To determine the percentage that were consumed, Stroud et al. (2010, 2011) used bioenergetic models linked to population estimates. They estimate that the predators consumed 105 (95% CI, 86–162)% of the 0.5-year kokanee salmon, 39 (33–68)% of the 1.5-year kokanee salmon, 74 (60–118)% of the 1-year rainbow trout and 53 (44–92)% of the 2 and 3-year old rainbow trout in a 113-day study window.

An additional threat to the river system fish is the expansion of invasive northern pike down the upper Columbia from the Pend Oreille River where they were first detected in 2004. Pike have been moving downstream towards the Sanpoil and Grand Coulee Dam, but had not been detected in that Sanpoil area as of 2018. The pike are noted predators of small and larger fish, with a preference for soft-rayed fish such as salmon and trout. Pike have been moving downstream towards the Sanpoil and Grand Coulee Dam, but had not been detected in that Sanpoil area as of 2018. However in early 2019, two mature pike, a male and an egg laden female, were caught in the Sanpoil arm. The pair were caught before the female could spawn, but there is concern that the encroachment could impact native runs of redband and bull trout.

== History ==
The river valley is the hereditary home of the Sanpoil people, the Interior Salish who are now part of the Colville Confederated Tribes. The term Sanpoil is from the Okanagan term [snpʕʷílx], meaning "people of the gray country", or "gray as far as one can see". Its noted that early misattribution of the name was to a "possible Spanish" origin, and that early translations of the name to English included Hudson's Bay Companys 1825 "Lampoile" by John Work and David Douglas's 1826 "Cinqpoil".

The mouth and lower river valley of the Sanpoil was visited by David Thompson and his party on July 3, 1811, after the first day of his journey down the Columbia River. This was the first visit to the lower Sanpoil valley by Europeans, and was done on commission of the Canadian fur trading North West Company who were looking to chart the Columbia for trade routes.

On January 2, 1902, the Spokane and British Columbia Railway was approved by the Secretary of the Interior to conduct surveying for a southern line though the Colville Reservation along the Sanpoil River. The full extent of the line was a proposed 140 mi (230 km) route connecting Republic to Spokane, Washington. With the 1905 reorganization of the company into the Spokane and British Columbia Railway, an additional $4,000,000 in stocks was authorized for the southern line. However, as of a 1915 valuation by the US Commerce Commission, little actual building or prep work had been made on the southern route due to building debts, and none of the additional stocks had been issued.

A series of dams were proposed and investigated along the course of the Sanpoil River prior to 1930, though none would be built. The six sites were spaced along the lower Sanpoil from 7 miles south of the West Fork Sanpoil River confluence to 6 miles north of the old Keller townsite. From upstream to downstream they were to be named Devils Elbow Dam #3, Devils Elbow #2, Devils Elbow #1, Louis Creek Dam, Iron Creek Dam, and Sanpoil Dam; each of the dams was to create small retention pools for general domestic use.

In early 2017, heavy rains combined with intense snowmelt throughout the Sanpoil River Basin resulted in the worst flooding that had been seen in the valley in decades. The flooding washed out at least one house and the west embankment for the State Route 21 bridge over the West Fork Sanpoil River. The highway was impassable through the section for over two weeks, until the Washington State Department of Transportation completed installation of a temporary one lane bailey bridge over the river from surplus bridge parts. The bridge was not fully replaced and officially reopened for full traffic use until October 2020, with construction of the permanent replacement bridge starting in early 2020.
