= Barstow, Washington =

Unincorporated community in Washington, United States

- Census-designated place
- Location within Washington (state) Location within the United States
- Coordinates: 48°46′42″N 118°07′43″W
- Country: United States
- State: Washington
- County: Ferry

Area
  - Total: 0.56 sq mi (1.45 km^{2})
  - Land: 0.56 sq mi (1.45 km^{2})
  - Water: 0 sq mi (0.0 km^{2})
- Elevation: 1,388 ft (423 m)

Population (2010)
  - Total: 59
  - Density: 105/sq mi (40.7/km^{2})
- ZIP code: 99141
- Area code: 509
- GNIS feature ID: 2631208

Barstow is a census-designated place (CDP) and unincorporated community in Ferry County in the U.S. state of Washington. As of the 2020 census, Barstow had a population of 66.

== Geography ==
Barstow is located in northeastern Ferry County, along U.S. Route 395 on the west side of the Kettle River. US 395 leads south 14 miles (23 km) to Kettle Falls and north 17 miles (27 km) to the Canadian border at Laurier.

According to the U.S. Census Bureau, the Barstow CDP has an area of 0.56 square miles (1.45 km^{2}), all of it land.

== Cougar attack ==
In 1999, a four-year-old boy was injured in a cougar attack. The boy survived the ambush despite suffering a serious neck wound and the cougar was found and put down. The event occurred a mile south of Barstow and was the ninth recorded attack by a cougar in Washington state history up to that time.

== Demographics ==
Historical population
Census	Pop.	Note	%±
2010	59		—
2020	66		11.9%
U.S. Decennial Census; 2000 2010

Barstow first appeared as a census designated place in the 2010 U.S. census.

=== Racial and ethnic composition ===
Barstow CDP, Washington – Racial and ethnic composition Note: the US Census treats Hispanic/Latino as an ethnic category. This table excludes Latinos from the racial categories and assigns them to a separate category. Hispanics/Latinos may be of any race.
Race / Ethnicity (NH = Non-Hispanic)	Pop 2010	Pop 2020	% 2010	% 2020
White alone (NH)	57	60	96.61%	90.91%
Black or African American alone (NH)	0	0	0.00%	0.00%
Native American or Alaska Native alone (NH)	1	2	1.69%	3.03%
Asian alone (NH)	0	0	0.00%	0.00%
Native Hawaiian or Pacific Islander alone (NH)	0	0	0.00%	0.00%
Other race alone (NH)	0	2	0.00%	3.03%
Mixed race or Multiracial (NH)	1	1	1.69%	1.52%
Hispanic or Latino (any race)	0	1	0.00%	1.52%
Total	59	66	100.00%	100.00%
