= Pine Grove, Washington =

- Census-designated place
- Location within Washington (state) Location within the United States
- Coordinates: 48°39′01″N 118°41′02″W
- Country: United States
- State: Washington
- County: Ferry

Area
  - Total: 0.49 sq mi (1.27 km^{2})
  - Land: 0.49 sq mi (1.27 km^{2})
  - Water: 0 sq mi (0.0 km^{2})
- Elevation: 2,428 ft (740 m)

Population (2010)
  - Total: 145
  - Density: 296/sq mi (114/km^{2})
- Time zone: Pacific
- ZIP Code: 99166
- Area code(s): 360, 564
- GNIS feature ID: 2631352

Pine Grove is a census-designated place located in Ferry County, Washington, United States. As of the 2020 census, Pine Grove had a population of 129.

== Demographics ==
Historical population
Census	Pop.	Note	%±
2010	145		—
2020	129		−11.0%
U.S. Decennial Census; 2000 2010

Pine Grove first appeared as a census designated place in the 2010 U.S. census.

=== Racial and ethnic composition ===
Pine Grove CDP, Washington – Racial and ethnic composition Note: the US Census treats Hispanic/Latino as an ethnic category. This table excludes Latinos from the racial categories and assigns them to a separate category. Hispanics/Latinos may be of any race.
Race / Ethnicity (NH = Non-Hispanic)	Pop 2010	Pop 2020	% 2010	% 2020
White alone (NH)	133	114	91.72%	88.37%
Black or African American alone (NH)	0	0	0.00%	0.00%
Native American or Alaska Native alone (NH)	6	0	4.14%	0.00%
Asian alone (NH)	0	0	0.00%	0.00%
Native Hawaiian or Pacific Islander alone (NH)	0	0	0.00%	0.00%
Other race alone (NH)	0	0	0.00%	0.00%
Mixed race or Multiracial (NH)	3	14	2.07%	10.85%
Hispanic or Latino (any race)	3	1	2.07%	0.78%
Total	145	129	100.00%	100.00%

=== 2010 census ===
In 2010, it had a population of 145. The census recorded that 68 of the inhabitants were male, and 77 were female.

== Geography ==
Pine Grove is located in northwestern Ferry County and is 3 miles (5 km) east of Republic, the county seat. The Pine Grove community rests immediately south of the intersection of State Routes 20 and 21. Route 20 leads east 40 miles (64 km) across Sherman Pass to Kettle Falls, while Route 21 leads north 18 miles (29 km) to Curlew and 28 miles (45 km) to the Canadian border.

According to the U.S. Census Bureau, the Pine Grove CDP has a total area of 0.50 square miles (1.3 km^{2}), all of it land. It is in the valley of the Sanpoil River, a south-flowing tributary of the Columbia River.
