= Mahoney Lake =

Lake in British Columbia, Canada

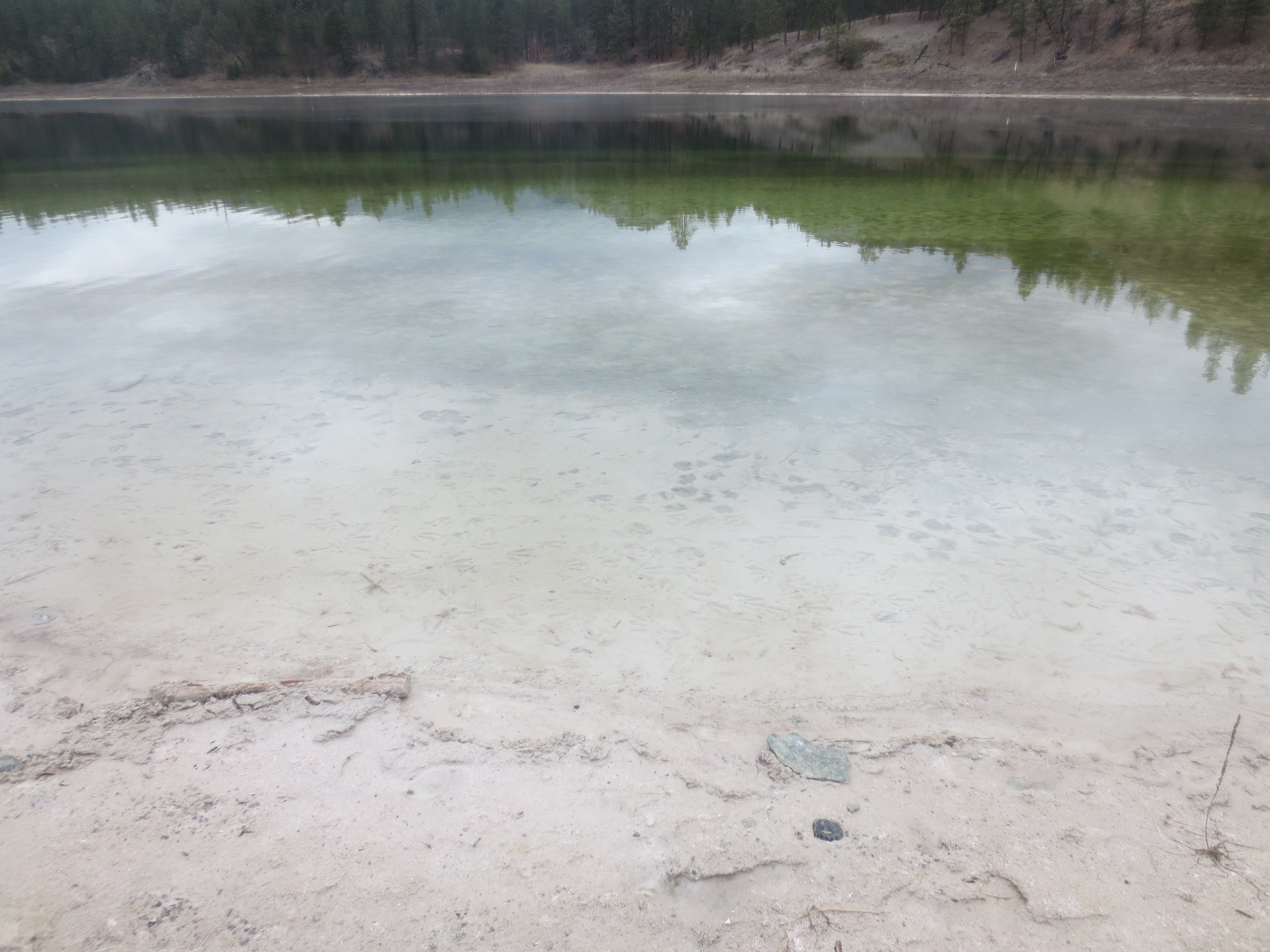
- Winter Morning at Meromictic Mahoney Lake

- Location within British Columbia
- Location: British Columbia, Canada
- Coordinates: 49°17′24″N 119°34′55″W
- Length: 895 km (556 mi)
- Area: 18 ha (44 acres)
- Elevation: 472 m (1,549 ft)
- Established: 1972

Mahoney Lake is a meromictic saline lake located near Okanagan Falls in British Columbia, Canada. It was established as an ecological reserve to preserve a southern interior saline lake, possessing unique limnological features in 1972. It has a unique layering, where the very bottom of the lake is very salt rich and contains hydrogen sulphide (H_{2}S), which facilitates the growth of the purple sulphur bacteria in the layer above it, where the bacteria has just enough light to grow. The upper layer of the lake consists of a mixing layer of fresh water. Mahoney Lake is alkaline because it features no inflow or outflow of water. The lake also contains very low levels of oxygen and an approximate pH of 7.5-9.0. The surface area of the lake is 18ha and the surface area of the land is 21ha, with combined total of 21 ha.

== Images ==
Last of the Winter Ice

== See also ==
- List of lakes of British Columbia
