= Anderson's Grocery =

Grocery store in Republic, Washington

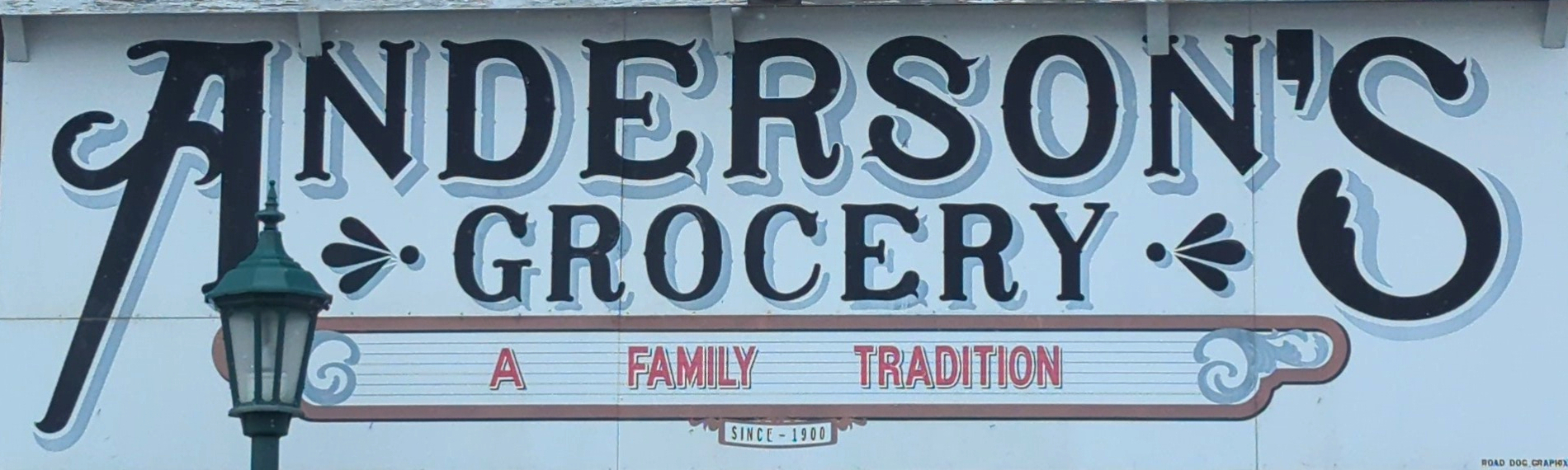

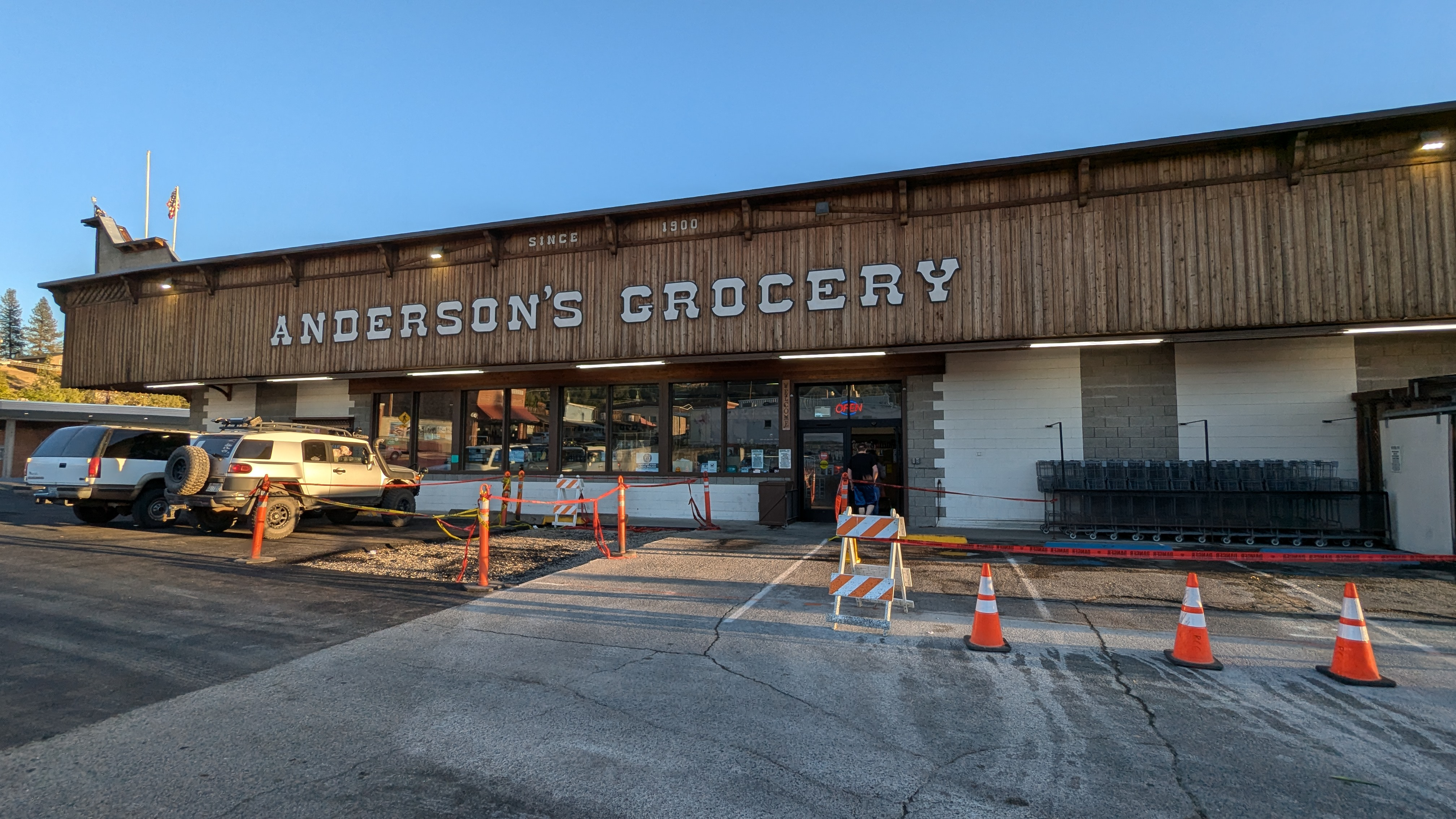
- Front of building facing north
- Trade name: Anderson's Grocery, A family Tradition
- Formerly: Anderson's Grocery & Flour Mill; Anderson's Grocery & Gas
- Industry: Grocery
- Founded: Summer 1900; 126 years ago, Republic, Washington
- Founder: Charles E. Anderson
- Number of locations: (1)
- Area served: Northern Ferry County, Washington
- Services: Produce, meat dept/butcher, bakery, deli, frozen, dry goods, canned goods.
- Number of employees: 36 (2000)

Anderson's Grocery, A Family Tradition, more frequently called Anderson's Grocery, is a family-owned grocery store located in Republic, Washington. In 2000 it was one of a few small chain or single location groceries in the US that were a century or more old. The grocery celebrated its centennial year with a "summer of celebration". The grocery was the recipient of the 2015 Washington Food Industry Association "Excellence in Operations Award".

== History ==
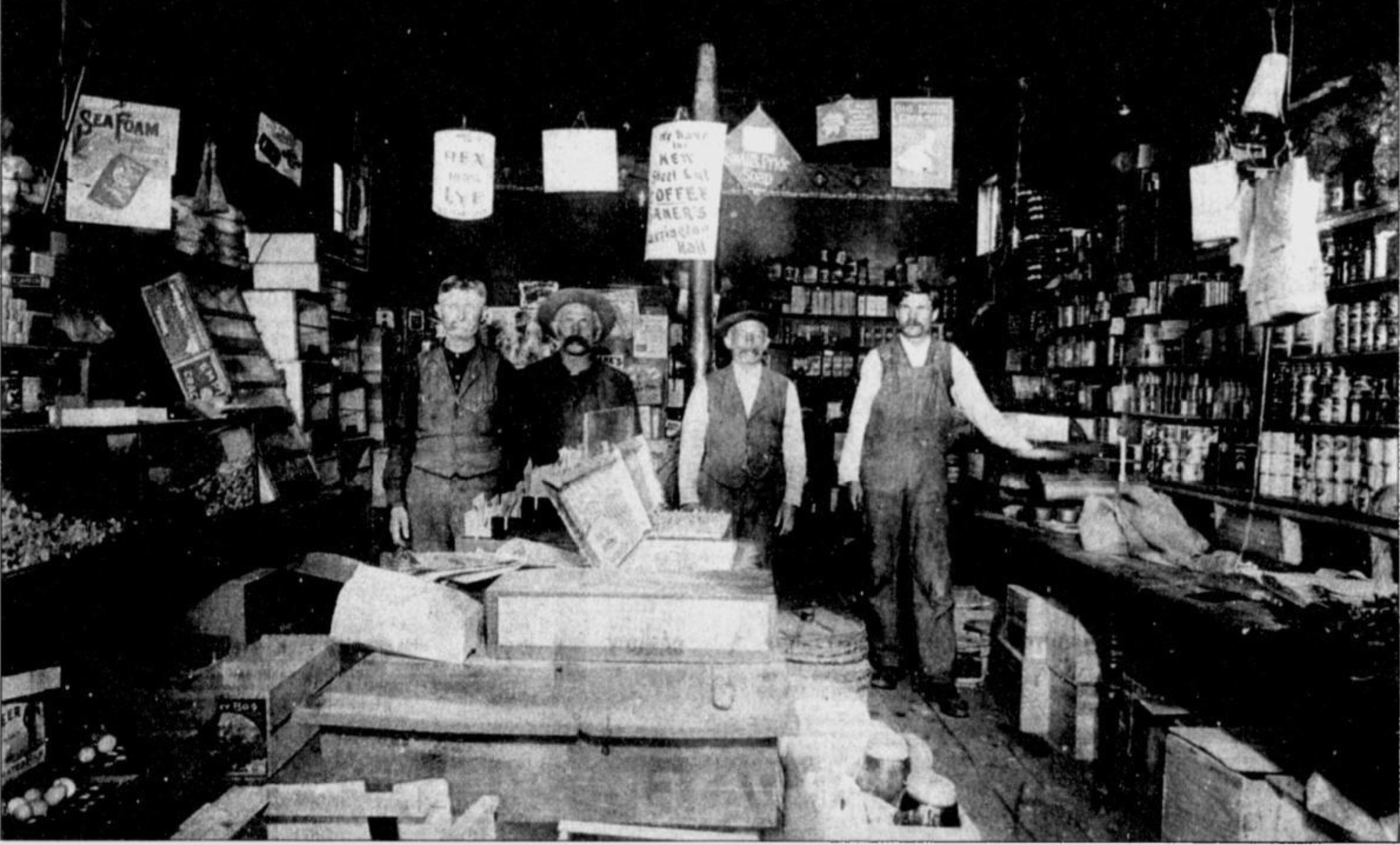
Anderson's Grocery c.1900

Swedish immigrant Charles E. Anderson arrived in Republic early in 1900, and by summertime had organized the placement and construction of a grocery on Clark Avenue. He continued to run the grocery until his retirement, training his sons in the business during that time. The second generation of the Anderson family, Charles H., Dean, and John A. Anderson took over running the store from their father Charles E. in 1946, and ran the business through 1976. They were in turn bought out by the third generation Carl, Gary, and John Anderson, who learned from the older Andersons. They operated Anderson's Grocery through the 1980s and started training the next generation of the family. They were bought out in 1998 by the fourth generation of the Anderson family Kari Beedle and Julie Padilla, along with long time employee Judee Young.

Anderson's Grocery celebrated its centennial year in 2000, with a "summer of celebration". In March 2000, the store put out a call for memories and memorabilia to be sent or given to Anderson's in preparation of the summer events. At that time, the Food Marketing Institute identified it as one of only 10 small grocery chains in the United States that had been active for a century or more, with few of the ten still under original family management.

=== Building ===
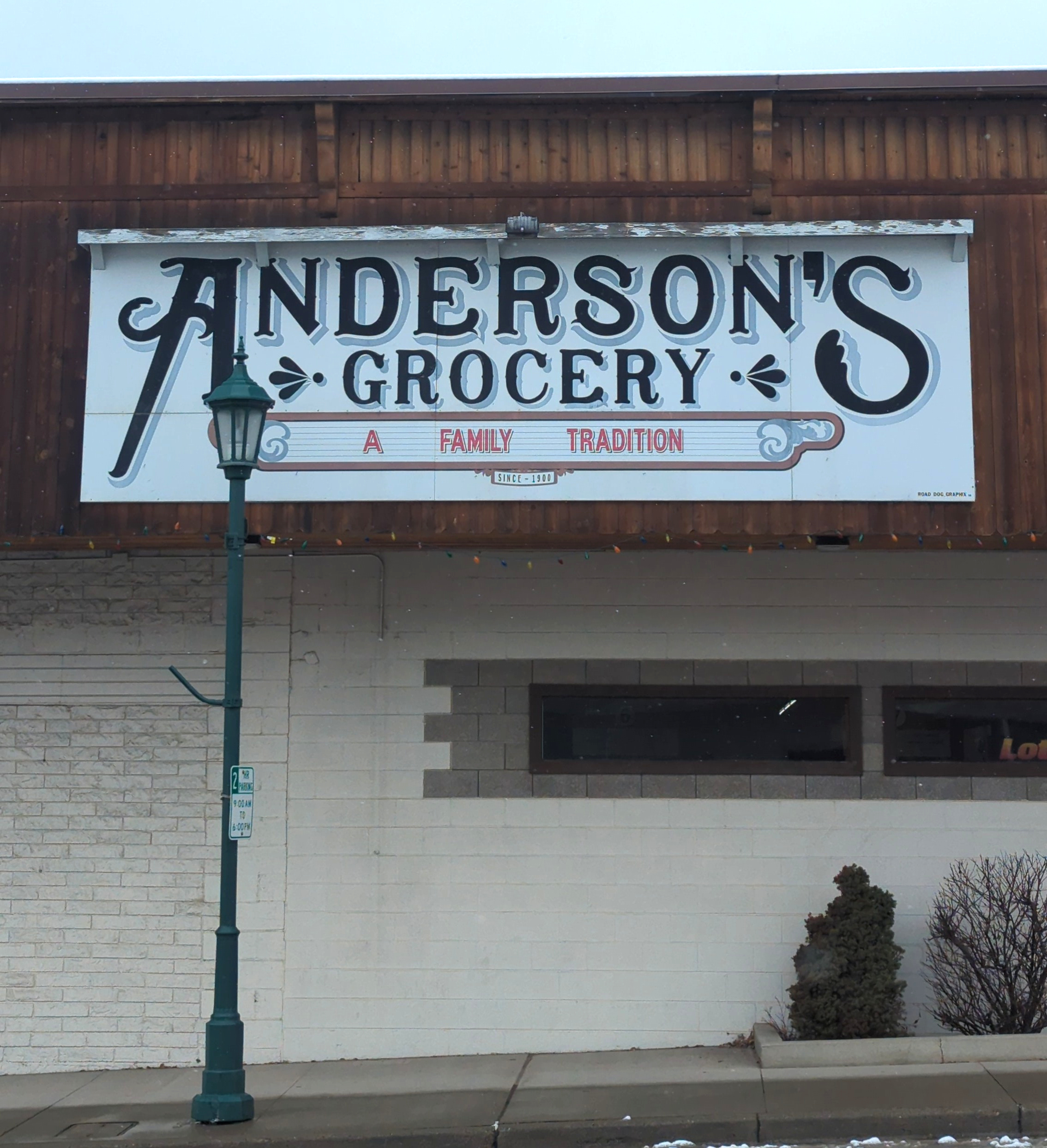
Sign on Clark Avenue

Anderson's Grocery is one of the few Republic businesses that has not burned down at any point after opening. Even so, the store was fully rebuilt in the mid-1950s, with the original building being demolished and the new building of Arizona brick and concrete block construction was reported on in January 1955. The store was later expanded upon and renovated in 1985, with the four checkout lanes in the front of the remodeled store placed in the area the original building had stood. The store is open seven days a week.

=== Outreach ===
Anderson's Grocery established the "Mary French Foundation" in 2007 after the passing of long time employee Mary French from cancer. As of 2015 the foundation had raised over $23,000 through a variety of events such as bake sales, raffles, and sale of hand-knitted clothing items, the proceeds of which are presented to senior students at Republic high school. The store has also given out over $10,000 in scholarships to Ferry County students.

== Awards ==
Anderson's Grocery was recipient of the 2015 Washington Food Industry Association (WFIA) "Excellence in Operations Award" on October 27, 2015, at WFIA's annual reception and award ceremony in Spokane, Washington. Beedle, Padilla, and Young's implementation of employee incentivization programs such as 401(k) offerings and bonuses, along with expansion of the grocery offerings and amenities like parking lot expansion were noted reasons.

== Departments and services ==
From 1917 until demolition and construction of the 1954 building, Anderson's Grocery offered grain-milling services to its customers in exchange for discounted milling rates or groceries. Bartering for goods such as eggs and wool continued until regulations on sales tax collection came into effect.

Anderson's Grocery has an in-house bakery, butchery and meat department, and a produce department with fresh vegetables and fruit. The deli prepares ready-to-eat cold and hot food items including rotisserie chicken, a variety of fried foods, cold salads, and sandwiches. The bakery produces batches of fresh donuts, pastries, and breads. The store stocks a variety of beer, spirits, and wines, and dry, canned, and frozen goods. As of June 2000, the meat department offered custom meat cutting services for ranchers and hunters in need, and delivery service is available.

=== Fuel depot ===
For a few years in the 1980s, the grocery had an associated fuel depot for gasoline sales. Anderson's Grocery had five underground storage tanks installed in 1986; the tanks were subsequently removed in early December 1997. The fuel depot was comprised of a 1,000 US gal (3,800 L), a 2,500 US gal (9,500 L), and three 4,000 US gal (15,000 L) tanks along with a pump island in the northwestern corner of the parking lot area.

While all five tanks were reported in good condition, having no corrosion or holes when removed, the soil beneath the 2,500 US gal (9,500 L) and 4,000 US gal (15,000 L) tanks did contain fuel contamination, as did the area under the pump island. In the early 1990s there were reports of gasoline odor in homes towards the southern end of Republic and near the city water wells. A 1993 initial soil gas survey identified three possible sources for the fuel leak. In addition to the Anderson's fuel depot, a former Texaco station also on Clark Avenue had a leaking gasoline pipe in 1986 that had not been initially reported, while a utility shop on the corner of 6th Avenue and South Kean Street, 1 block west of the Texaco site, had a diesel spill around 1989 leading to the underground storage tank there being removed. Cleanup on the Anderson's Grocery property involved the removal of the contaminated soil down to bedrock at a depth of approximately 8.5 ft (2.6 m) and infilling of the area with clean soils before paving with asphalt. Anderson's and the former Texaco site are still monitored due to being less than 1 mi (1.6 km) away from the three city water wells, which are classified by Washington state in the "high susceptibility" category for potential contamination.
