= Ferry County, Washington =

County in Washington, United States

- County
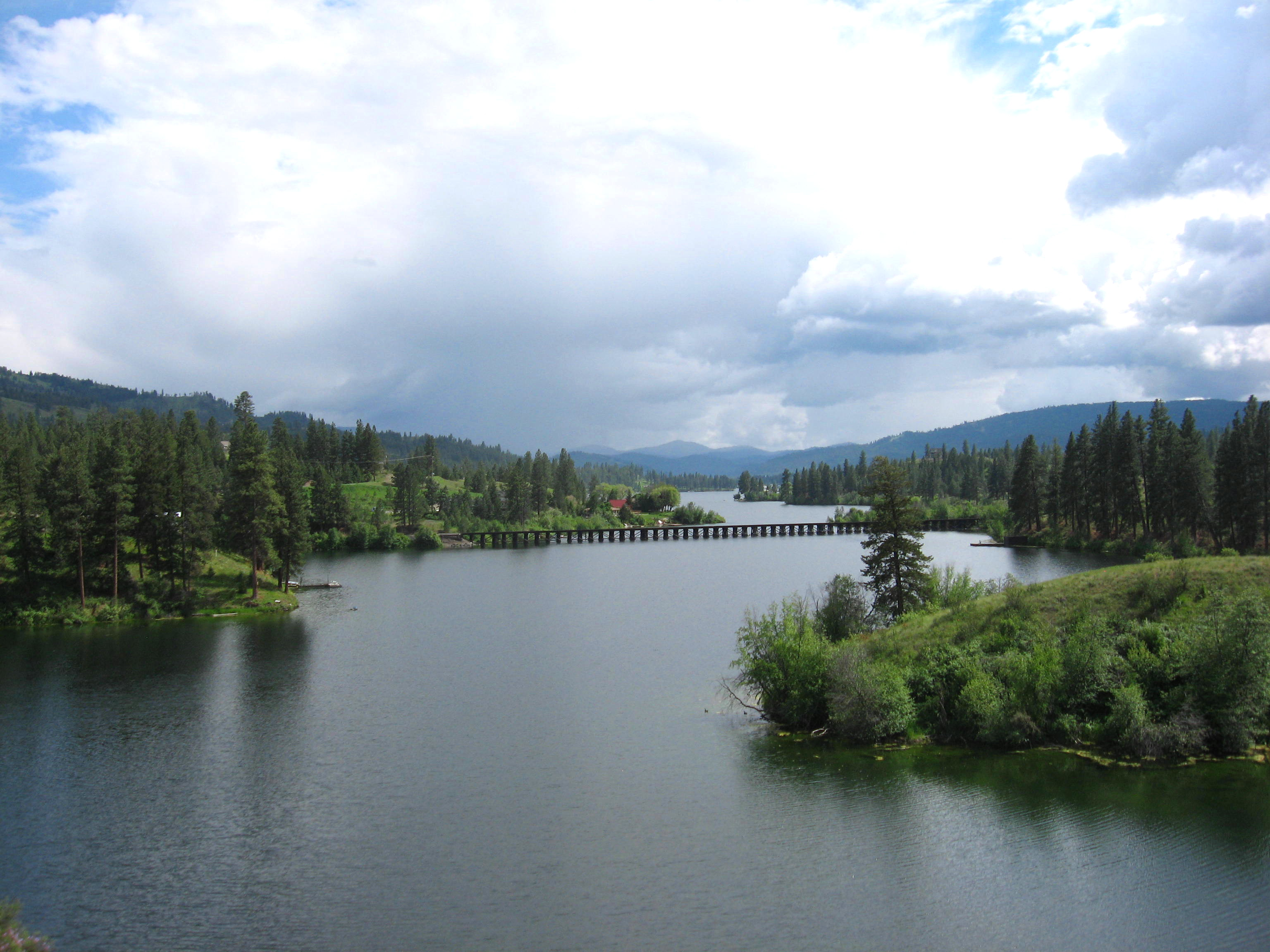
- Ferry County Rail Trail trestle at Curlew Lake

- Location within the U.S. state of Washington
- Coordinates: 48°28′N 118°31′W
- Country: United States
- State: Washington
- Founded: February 21, 1899
- Named for: Elisha P. Ferry
- Seat: Republic
- Largest city: Republic

Area
  - Total: 2,257 sq mi (5,850 km^{2})
  - Land: 2,203 sq mi (5,710 km^{2})
  - Water: 54 sq mi (140 km^{2}) 2.4%

Population (2020)
  - Total: 7,178
  - Estimate (2025): 7,517 ▲
  - Density: 3.5/sq mi (1.4/km^{2})
- Time zone: UTC−8 (Pacific)
  - Summer (DST): UTC−7 (PDT)
- Congressional district: 5th
- Website: www.ferry-county.com

Ferry County is a county located on the northern border of the U.S. state of Washington. As of the 2020 census, the population was 7,178, making it the fourth-least populous county in Washington. The county seat and largest city is Republic. The county was created out of Stevens County in February 1899 and is named for Elisha P. Ferry, the state's first governor.

== Etymology ==
The county was first slated by the state government to be named "Eureka County", but was revised while the bill was in discussion to "Ferry County" in recognition of the Territory's last governor and the State's first governor, Elisha P. Ferry. The change is suggested to have happened as a bookend to the naming of Stevens County, named for the first governor of Washington Territory.

== History ==
The Territorial Legislature of Washington Territory first carved Stevens County from Walla Walla County in 1863 to encompass all the land from the Columbia River west to the Cascades and north of the Wenatchee River. On January 20, 1864, the original territorial Spokane County was dissolved and merged with the unorganized Stevens County. On February 2, 1888 the western expanse of territorial Stevens County was sectioned off by dividing the county in half along the Okanogan Highlands crest. Eleven years later, on February 18, 1899, the western section of Stevens County was again sectioned off, this time along the Columbia, to form Ferry County.

The town of Republic is the county's seat of government, as well as the largest town. It was founded at the end of the nineteenth century by gold prospectors and was incorporated in 1900. The original election precinct of Republic was created on April 6, 1898. Following the 1922 primary elections, a group of citizens called for an investigation into possible election irregularities. The group claimed that two of that years voting precincts had been formed unlawfully in conjunction with misconduct in six precincts by election officers and the canvassing board. As a result of the actions, the validity of two candidates were called in question. Demands were made that Thomas F. Barker, seeking re-election as sheriff, and John W. McCool, seeking the County Treasurer seat, be barred from the ballot. Barker was notably facing charges at the federal level at that time from allegations of conspiring and abetting bootleggers.

During the Great Depression several Civilian Conservation Corps camps were opened in the County, with Camp Growden on Sherman Creek, between Sherman Pass and Kettle Falls being the largest and longest running. The Camp was open between 1934 and 1941, while smaller and "spike" camps were seasonally staffed on Boulder Pass, in Republic, near Quartz Mountain, and around Mount Bonaparte to the west.

The original county courthouse, made of wood, burned in 1934. Its replacement, made of concrete and stucco, was under consideration beginning in 2018 for historical preservation.

On August 13, 2001, a series of major wildfires and complexes were ignited by regional lightning storms passing over eastern Washington. Among them was the Mount Leona Fire which burned for several weeks and encompassed over 6,000 acres in the central Kettle River range northeast of Curlew Lake.

== Geography ==
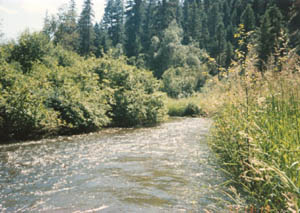
The Sanpoil River flows south to the Columbia

Ferry County is bordered on the north by the Kootenay Boundary Regional District, British Columbia, Canada, along the 49th parallel; to the west by Okanogan County along the boundary between ranges 31 and 32 east; to the south by Lincoln County in the midline of the Columbia River; and on the east by Stevens County, again along the Columbia River and then Kettle River midlines. According to the United States Census Bureau, the county has a total area of 2,257 square miles (5,850 km^{2}), of which 2,203 square miles (5,710 km^{2}) is land and 54 square miles (140 km^{2}) (2.4%) is water. Most of Ferry County is covered by the rugged Kettle River Range, which extends from the Canada–US border to its southernmost perimeter bounded by the Columbia River and Roosevelt Lake. Only a narrow north–south strip running the length of the county on the west between the Sanpoil River and the Okanogan County line encompasses part of the Okanogan Highland. Except for the town of Republic, the county is sparsely populated.

The county has three major river systems, with the impounded Columbia Rivers Franklin D. Roosevelt Lake forming the southern and most of the eastern county boundary. Along the northern border, the Kettle River drops south into the county near the Midway, British Columbia border crossing, before turning north again at Curlew to cross into Canada at the Danville border crossing. It swings south again on the eastern side of the Kettle River Range and passes into the US just east of the Lauier border crossing and is the northern section of the Ferry-Stevens county Border before joining with the Columbia River north of Barney's Junction. The southern and south central part of the county from just south of Curlew Lake is all drained by the south flowing Sanpoil River, which joins Franklin D. Roosevelt Lake at the southern tip of the county south of Keller. Southwest of Republic in the eastern edge of the Okanogan highlands is a group of four recreational lakes, Swan Lake, Ferry Lake, Fish Lake, and Long Lake in Colville National Forest land, while the Lake Roosevelt National Recreation Area is accessible on the eastern edges of the county.

=== Kettle River Peaks ===
The highest peaks in the county are located along the crest of the Kettle River Range and are part of either the Colville National Forest or the Colville Indian Reservation. Washington State Route 20 crosses over the Kettle River Range along the southern shoulder of Sherman Peak at Sherman Pass, which at 5,575 feet (1,699 m) is highest mountain pass open all year in the state. Boulder-Deer Creek Pass is a paved two-lane county road and one of several critical secondary roads that provide access into and out of Ferry County. Its eastern terminus is with U.S. Route 395 south of Orient, while the western end forms a junction with State Route 21 at Curlew, and the western continuation of the road is labeled as the West Kettle River Road. Boulder Creek Road is one of three passes crossing the Kettle River Range, and the northern most. In the southern Kettle River Range is Bridge Creek Pass between Highway 21 and Inchelium. The road starts at approximately 1,800 ft (550 m) at Curlew and climbs up to a crest of 4,600 ft (1,400 m) and then drops back down to about 1.400 ft (0.427 m) at Highway 395.

Crossing the county east to west is the Pacific Northwest National Scenic Trail, which enters the county along the Boulder pass highway, turns south along the Kettle Crest National Recreation Trail and turns west again along the 13 mile trail.

- Copper Butte, highest point: 7,140 feet (2,176 m)
- Snow Peak, 7,103 feet (2,165 m)
- Scar Mountain, 7,046 feet (2,148 m)
- Wapaloosie Mountain, 7,018 feet (2,139 m)
- Sherman Peak, 7,011 feet (2,137 m)
- Bald Mountain, 6,940 feet (2,115 m)
- White Mountain, 6,923 feet (2,110 m)
- Columbia Mountain, 6,782 feet (2,067 m)
- Midnight Mountain, 6,660 feet (2,030 m)
- King Mountain, 6,634 feet (2,022 m)
- Edds Mountain, 6,540 feet (1,993 m)

== Economy ==
Ferry County reaches to Canada on the north, and to the Columbia River on the east. Its southern portion is in the boundary of the Colville Indian Reservation, controlled by the Colville Confederated Tribes, and its northern portion is largely occupied by Colville National Forest. As a result, only eighteen percent of the total county area is taxable-use ground. The county's economy is largely based on timber-extraction, and mining.

Ferry County's topography and climate make it an ideal recreation destination, so tourism has become a significant portion of the county's economy .It has the largest secondhand store in the state Malo trading in Malo on 21n Washington State Highway 20, designated a National Scenic Highway, crosses the county east–west, and has the state's highest navigable pass (5,575 feet above sea level).

The county seat, Republic, is the site of the Stonerose Interpretive Center and Fossil Site, which exhibits and explains Eocene-era fossils from an ancient lake bed north of Republic. Anderson's Grocery is the main grocery of northern Ferry County, having been in operation since 1900, and never burning down.

== Demographics ==
Historical population
Census	Pop.	Note	%±
1900	4,562		—
1910	4,800		5.2%
1920	5,143		7.1%
1930	4,292		−16.5%
1940	4,701		9.5%
1950	4,096		−12.9%
1960	3,889		−5.1%
1970	3,655		−6.0%
1980	5,811		59.0%
1990	6,295		8.3%
2000	7,260		15.3%
2010	7,551		4.0%
2020	7,178		−4.9%
2025 (est.)	7,517	▲	4.7%
U.S. Decennial Census; 1790–1960 1900–1990; 1990–2000 2010–2020

=== Racial and ethnic composition ===
Ferry County, Washington – Racial and ethnic composition Note: the US Census treats Hispanic/Latino as an ethnic category. This table excludes Latinos from the racial categories and assigns them to a separate category. Hispanics/Latinos may be of any race.
Race / Ethnicity (NH = Non-Hispanic)	Pop 1980	Pop 1990	Pop 2000	Pop 2010	Pop 2020	% 1980	% 1990	% 2000	% 2010	% 2020
White alone (NH)	4,722	5,044	5,439	5,662	5,056	81.26%	80.13%	74.92%	74.98%	70.44%
Black or African American alone (NH)	32	20	15	18	21	0.55%	0.32%	0.21%	0.24%	0.29%
Native American or Alaska Native alone (NH)	983	1,121	1,289	1,215	1,293	16.92%	17.81%	17.75%	16.09%	18.01%
Asian alone (NH)	6	23	18	52	43	0.10%	0.37%	0.25%	0.69%	0.60%
Native Hawaiian or Pacific Islander alone (NH)	x	x	4	8	11	x	x	0.06%	0.11%	0.15%
Other race alone (NH)	7	2	74	8	36	0.12%	0.03%	1.02%	0.11%	0.50%
Mixed race or Multiracial (NH)	x	x	216	334	508	x	x	2.98%	4.42%	7.08%
Hispanic or Latino (any race)	61	85	205	254	210	1.05%	1.35%	2.82%	3.36%	2.93%
Total	5,811	6,295	7,260	7,551	7,178	100.00%	100.00%	100.00%	100.00%	100.00%

=== 2020 census ===
As of the 2020 census, the county had a population of 7,178. Of the residents, 18.8% were under the age of 18 and 29.6% were 65 years of age or older; the median age was 51.6 years. For every 100 females there were 103.2 males, and for every 100 females age 18 and over there were 103.9 males. 0.0% of residents lived in urban areas and 100.0% lived in rural areas.

The racial makeup of the county was 71.3% White, 0.4% Black or African American, 18.2% American Indian and Alaska Native, 0.6% Asian, 1.3% from some other race, and 8.0% from two or more races. Hispanic or Latino residents of any race comprised 2.9% of the population.

There were 3,140 households in the county, of which 23.2% had children under the age of 18 living with them and 23.9% had a female householder with no spouse or partner present. About 31.9% of all households were made up of individuals and 16.8% had someone living alone who was 65 years of age or older.

There were 4,059 housing units, of which 22.6% were vacant. Among occupied housing units, 73.9% were owner-occupied and 26.1% were renter-occupied. The homeowner vacancy rate was 1.8% and the rental vacancy rate was 7.7%.

=== 2010 census ===
As of the 2010 census, there were 7,551 people, 3,190 households, and 2,070 families living in the county. The population density was 3.4 inhabitants per square mile (1.3/km^{2}). There were 4,403 housing units at an average density of 2.0 per square mile (0.77/km^{2}). The racial makeup of the county was 76.3% white, 16.7% American Indian, 0.7% Asian, 0.3% black or African American, 0.1% Pacific islander, 1.2% from other races, and 4.8% from two or more races. Those of Hispanic or Latino origin made up 3.4% of the population. In terms of ancestry, 23.0% were German, 18.0% were English, 12.3% were Irish, and 3.7% were American.

Of the 3,190 households, 23.9% had children under the age of 18 living with them, 49.2% were married couples living together, 9.2% had a female householder with no husband present, 35.1% were non-families, and 28.5% of all households were made up of individuals. The average household size was 2.29 and the average family size was 2.75. The median age was 47.3 years.

The median income for a household in the county was $35,485 and the median income for a family was $43,576. Males had a median income of $41,755 versus $30,972 for females. The per capita income for the county was $18,021. About 13.6% of families and 20.8% of the population were below the poverty line, including 24.3% of those under age 18 and 12.4% of those age 65 or over.

=== 2000 census ===
As of the 2000 census, there were 7,260 people, 2,823 households, and 1,987 families living in the county. The population density was 3 inhabitants per square mile (1.2/km^{2}). There were 3,775 housing units at an average density of 2 units per square mile (0.77 units/km^{2}). The racial makeup of the county was 75.48% White, 0.21% Black or African American, 18.28% Native American, 0.29% Asian, 0.06% Pacific Islander, 2.23% from other races, and 3.46% from two or more races. 2.82% of the population were Hispanic or Latino of any race. 14.1% were of German, 9.5% United States or American, 9.1% Irish, and 7.6% English ancestry. 96.7% spoke English and 1.9% Spanish as their first language.

There were 2,823 households, out of which 30.10% had children under the age of 18 living with them, 54.70% were married couples living together, 10.20% had a female householder with no husband present, and 29.60% were non-families. 24.80% of all households were made up of individuals, and 9.10% had someone living alone who was 65 years of age or older. The average household size was 2.49 and the average family size was 2.95.

In the county, the population was spread out, with 26.90% under the age of 18, 7.60% from 18 to 24, 23.40% from 25 to 44, 29.50% from 45 to 64, and 12.60% who were 65 years of age or older. The median age was 40 years. For every 100 females there were 107.70 males. For every 100 females age 18 and over, there were 105.20 males.

The median income for a household in the county was $30,388, and the median income for a family was $35,691. Males had a median income of $32,103 versus $23,371 for females. The per capita income for the county was $15,019. About 13.30% of families and 19.00% of the population were below the poverty line, including 20.40% of those under age 18 and 10.30% of those age 65 or over.

== Government ==
United States presidential election results for Ferry County, Washington
Year	Republican		Democratic		Third party(ies)	
Year	No.	%	No.	%	No.	%
1900	423	33.25%	830	65.25%	19	1.49%
1904	511	54.89%	297	31.90%	123	13.21%
1908	467	47.17%	393	39.70%	130	13.13%
1912	286	16.94%	609	36.08%	793	46.98%
1916	581	33.72%	913	52.99%	229	13.29%
1920	592	43.56%	505	37.16%	262	19.28%
1924	507	34.49%	349	23.74%	614	41.77%
1928	640	45.75%	732	52.32%	27	1.93%
1932	322	22.28%	1,035	71.63%	88	6.09%
1936	320	21.11%	1,130	74.54%	66	4.35%
1940	590	31.91%	1,247	67.44%	12	0.65%
1944	518	39.39%	792	60.23%	5	0.38%
1948	473	35.30%	824	61.49%	43	3.21%
1952	687	47.38%	754	52.00%	9	0.62%
1956	662	44.34%	830	55.59%	1	0.07%
1960	623	40.30%	921	59.57%	2	0.13%
1964	526	36.05%	931	63.81%	2	0.14%
1968	608	43.84%	596	42.97%	183	13.19%
1972	815	53.37%	560	36.67%	152	9.95%
1976	776	45.86%	814	48.11%	102	6.03%
1980	1,108	52.76%	802	38.19%	190	9.05%
1984	1,232	55.75%	935	42.31%	43	1.95%
1988	972	48.10%	972	48.10%	77	3.81%
1992	773	30.23%	963	37.66%	821	32.11%
1996	1,091	38.73%	1,197	42.49%	529	18.78%
2000	1,896	62.41%	932	30.68%	210	6.91%
2004	2,019	60.43%	1,201	35.95%	121	3.62%
2008	1,916	54.73%	1,467	41.90%	118	3.37%
2012	1,995	57.99%	1,294	37.62%	151	4.39%
2016	2,202	59.72%	1,098	29.78%	387	10.50%
2020	2,771	63.45%	1,486	34.03%	110	2.52%
2024	2,667	64.75%	1,315	31.93%	137	3.33%

=== County law enforcement ===
County-wide law enforcement is provided by the Ferry County Sheriff Office which is headquartered in Republic. Henry Waisman was the county's first sheriff, appointed by the county commissioners following the county's 1899 organization, with a mandate to serve until the first general election in 1900. The county's first elected sheriff was A.E. Stewart. The sheriff in 2016 was Ray Maycumber. The first woman to sit on a Ferry County jury was Lizzie R. McCourt who was seated on June 25, 1914 for Superior court proceedings.

== Communities ==
=== City ===
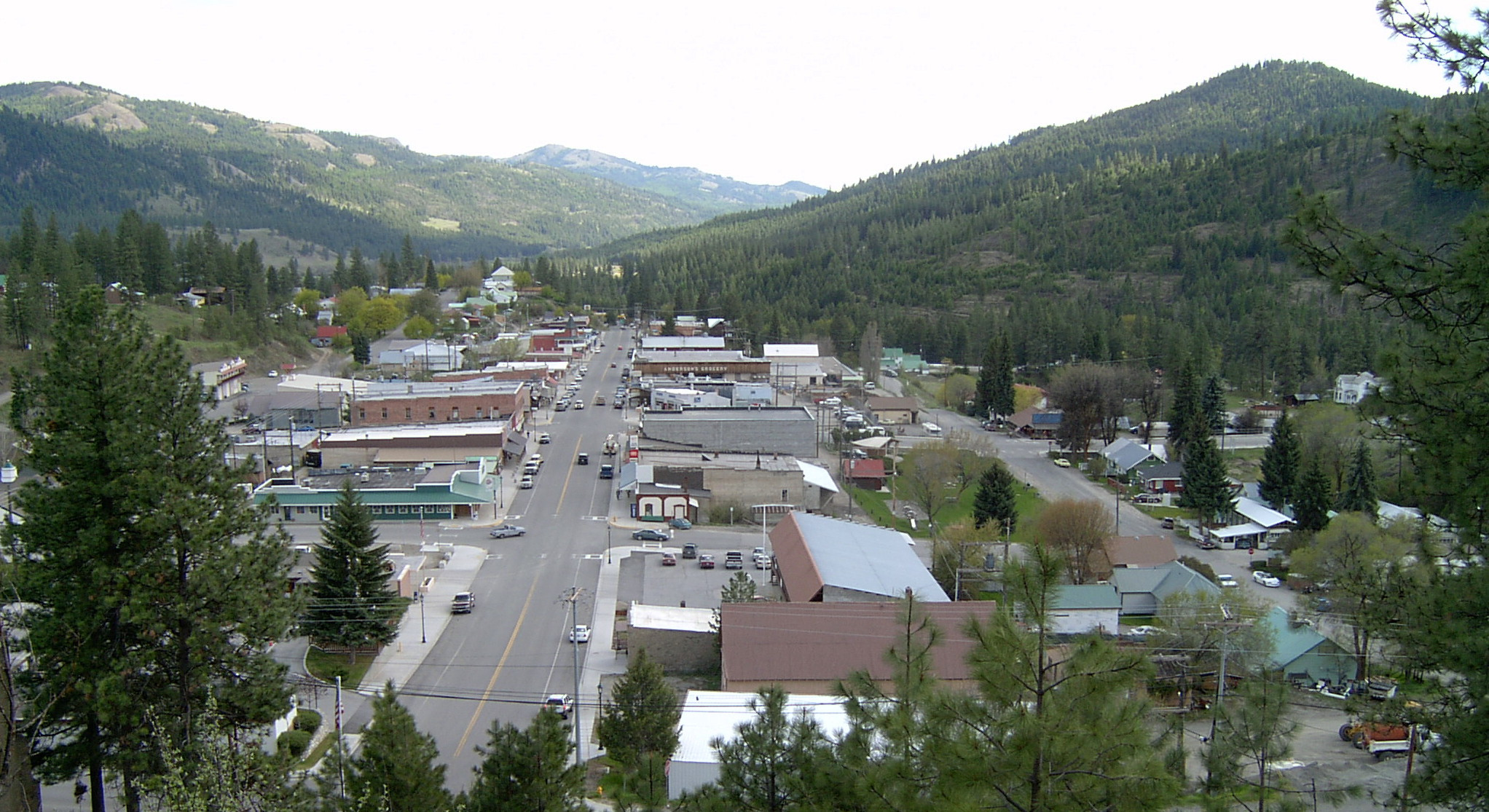
Republic, Washington

- Republic (county seat)

=== Census-designated places ===
- Barney's Junction
- Barstow
- Boyds
- Curlew
- Curlew Lake
- Danville
- Inchelium
- Keller
- Laurier
- Malo
- Orient
- Pine Grove
- Torboy
- Twin Lakes

=== Other unincorporated communities ===
- Covada
- Impach

== Notable people ==
- Alex N. Dragnich (1912-2009) - political scientist
- Stella Leach (1918-2010) - nurse and activist

== See also ==
- Ansorge Hotel
- Ferry County Carousel
- National Register of Historic Places listings in Ferry County, Washington
- List of law enforcement agencies in Washington (state)
