= Keller, Washington =

- Census-designated place
- Location within Washington (state) Location within the United States
- Coordinates: 48°04′57″N 118°43′46″W
- Country: United States
- State: Washington
- County: Ferry

Area
  - Total: 9.5 sq mi (24.6 km^{2})
  - Land: 9.5 sq mi (24.6 km^{2})
  - Water: 0 sq mi (0.0 km^{2})
- Elevation: 1,883 ft (574 m)

Population (2020)
  - Total: 229
  - Density: 25/sq mi (9.5/km^{2})
- Time zone: UTC-8 (Pacific (PST))
  - Summer (DST): UTC-7 (PDT)
- ZIP code: 99140
- Area code: 509
- GNIS feature ID: 2584987
- FIPS code: 53-34960

Keller is an unincorporated community and census-designated place (CDP) in southwestern Ferry County in the northeastern part of the U.S. state of Washington. As of the 2020 census, Keller had a population of 229.

== History ==
The town is located in the valley of the Sanpoil River, and was founded in 1898 by Baby Ray Peone, a local fisherman. The town was located in the area known as "God's Country" (or "Old Keller" to the locals). At its height the town had an estimated population of 3,500 and even featured a minor league baseball team and red light district. The town was moved several times beginning in 1940 due to backwatering from the Grand Coulee Dam which flooded its previous locations, and is now located 18 miles (29 km) north of the Columbia River. The series of moves seriously reduced its population over time.

The town is encompassed by the Colville Indian Reservation, which has an estimated population of roughly 1,200 people mostly of Native American descent and primarily members of the Sanpoil tribe, one of the Twelve Tribes that make up the Colville Confederated Tribes and one of the few Indian Nations that was never relocated by order of the U.S. government.

== 2024 Swawilla Fire ==
Dry lightning on July 17, 2024, ignited a wildfire in the Swawilla Canyon area southwest of Keller. Initial efforts to contain the Swawilla Fire were not effective and by July 20, WSDOT, operator of the Keller Ferry, made the decision to keep the ferry route closed after completion of scheduled maintenance that started July 16. The area surrounding the ferry's northern landing was by that point subject to a level 3 "go now" evacuation order by the fire command. By the evening of July 23, both fire progression and changes in weather prompted the fire command to issue a level 2 "get ready" notice for the area northeast of fire lines along highway 21 and including Keller. On the evening of July 24 a level 3 notice was issued for the greater Keller area as the winds shifted westerly and pushed flames northeasterly. The fire command stated it was very likely that the fire would impact the Keller area.

To assist with the increased level 3 evacuations, the Keller Ferry resumed service from the northern launch only, but is running overnight, contrary to regular scheduling which stops at dusk. The ferry was not performing any non-evacuation runs during that time.

== Demographics ==
Historical population
Census	Pop.	Note	%±
2010	234		—
2020	229		−2.1%
U.S. Decennial Census; 2000 2010

Deller first appeared as a census designated place in the 2010 U.S. census.

=== Racial and ethnic composition ===
Keller CDP, Washington – Racial and ethnic composition Note: the US Census treats Hispanic/Latino as an ethnic category. This table excludes Latinos from the racial categories and assigns them to a separate category. Hispanics/Latinos may be of any race.
Race / Ethnicity (NH = Non-Hispanic)	Pop 2010	Pop 2020	% 2010	% 2020
White alone (NH)	20	29	8.55%	12.66%
Black or African American alone (NH)	0	0	0.00%	0.00%
Native American or Alaska Native alone (NH)	179	174	76.50%	75.98%
Asian alone (NH)	1	2	0.43%	0.87%
Native Hawaiian or Pacific Islander alone (NH)	0	0	0.00%	0.00%
Other race alone (NH)	0	0	0.00%	0.00%
Mixed race or Multiracial (NH)	22	10	9.40%	4.37%
Hispanic or Latino (any race)	12	14	5.13%	6.11%
Total	234	229	100.00%	100.00%
