= Laurier, Washington =

- Census-designated place
- Location within Washington (state) Location within the United States
- Coordinates: 48°59′56″N 118°13′27″W
- Country: United States
- State: Washington
- County: Ferry

Area
  - Total: 0.062 sq mi (0.16 km^{2})
  - Land: 0.062 sq mi (0.16 km^{2})
  - Water: 0 sq mi (0 km^{2})
- Elevation: 1,654 ft (504 m)

Population (2020)
  - Total: 4
  - Density: 65/sq mi (25/km^{2})
- Time zone: UTC-8 (Pacific (PST))
  - Summer (DST): UTC-7 (PDT)
- ZIP code: 99146
- Area code: 509
- FIPS code: 53-38705
- GNIS feature ID: 2631350

Laurier is a census-designated place in Ferry County, Washington that neighbors the Canada–United States border. The nearest school district is Orient School District. According to the 2020 census, Laurier had a population of four permanent residents, up from a population of 1 in the 2010 Census.

== Name origin ==
The initial name of the community was Russel but the origin of the namesake was uncertain at the time. When seeking to establish a post office, Russel was discovered to have been an ex-convict, prompting a search for a new name. The Great Northern Railway, which arrived in 1902, chose Boawell from a combination of two settlers named Boath and Kidwell respectively. Kidwell preferred Laurier, after Sir Wilfrid Laurier who was prime minister of Canada from 1896 to 1911, and that name prevailed as did the post office opened that year.

== Infrastructure ==
The General Services Administration lists three buildings in Laurier, a border station and two border station residences, built in 1936. U.S. Route 395 runs through the community north to the Canada–U.S. border, where it becomes British Columbia Highway 395. The Avey Field State Airport is in Laurier and its runway crosses the border into British Columbia.

== Climate ==
This climatic region is typified by large seasonal temperature differences, with warm to hot (and often humid) summers and cold (sometimes severely cold) winters. According to the Köppen Climate Classification system, Laurier has a humid continental climate, abbreviated "Dfb" on climate maps.

Climate data for Laurier
Month	Jan	Feb	Mar	Apr	May	Jun	Jul	Aug	Sep	Oct	Nov	Dec	Year
Record high °F (°C)	57 (14)	58 (14)	73 (23)	92 (33)	102 (39)	103 (39)	109 (43)	106 (41)	105 (41)	85 (29)	61 (16)	56 (13)	109 (43)
Mean daily maximum °F (°C)	29.8 (−1.2)	37.9 (3.3)	49.3 (9.6)	62.2 (16.8)	71.7 (22.1)	78.1 (25.6)	87.3 (30.7)	86.2 (30.1)	74.8 (23.8)	58.3 (14.6)	40.5 (4.7)	31.8 (−0.1)	59 (15)
Mean daily minimum °F (°C)	15.1 (−9.4)	18.9 (−7.3)	25.2 (−3.8)	32.1 (0.1)	39.8 (4.3)	46.5 (8.1)	50 (10)	48.8 (9.3)	41.3 (5.2)	33.4 (0.8)	26.6 (−3.0)	19.4 (−7.0)	33.1 (0.6)
Record low °F (°C)	−32 (−36)	−30 (−34)	−13 (−25)	11 (−12)	16 (−9)	28 (−2)	30 (−1)	31 (−1)	18 (−8)	6 (−14)	−14 (−26)	−32 (−36)	−32 (−36)
Average precipitation inches (mm)	2.08 (53)	1.39 (35)	1.27 (32)	1.34 (34)	1.8 (46)	2.05 (52)	1.07 (27)	1.09 (28)	1.23 (31)	1.57 (40)	2.1 (53)	2.21 (56)	19.19 (487)
Average snowfall inches (cm)	18.4 (47)	8.5 (22)	3.1 (7.9)	0.1 (0.25)	0 (0)	0 (0)	0 (0)	0 (0)	0 (0)	0.7 (1.8)	5.6 (14)	16 (41)	52.5 (133)
Average precipitation days	14	10	10	9	11	11	6	6	7	10	14	14	122

== Demographics ==
Historical population
Census	Pop.	Note	%±
2010	1		—
2020	4		300.0%
U.S. Decennial Census; 2000 2010

Laurier first appeared as a census designated place in the 2010 U.S. census.

=== Racial and ethnic composition ===
Laurier CDP, Washington – Racial and ethnic composition Note: the US Census treats Hispanic/Latino as an ethnic category. This table excludes Latinos from the racial categories and assigns them to a separate category. Hispanics/Latinos may be of any race.
Race / Ethnicity (NH = Non-Hispanic)	Pop 2010	Pop 2020	% 2010	% 2020
White alone (NH)	0	1	0.00%	25.00%
Black or African American alone (NH)	0	0	0.00%	0.00%
Native American or Alaska Native alone (NH)	0	0	0.00%	0.00%
Asian alone (NH)	0	0	0.00%	0.00%
Native Hawaiian or Pacific Islander alone (NH)	0	0	0.00%	0.00%
Other race alone (NH)	0	0	0.00%	0.00%
Mixed race or Multiracial (NH)	1	2	100.00%	50.00%
Hispanic or Latino (any race)	0	1	0.00%	25.00%
Total	1	4	100.00%	100.00%
