= Inchelium, Washington =

- CDP
- Location of Inchelium, Washington
- Coordinates: 48°22′18″N 118°15′23″W
- Country: United States
- State: Washington
- County: Ferry

Area
  - Total: 26.6 sq mi (68.8 km^{2})
  - Land: 26.5 sq mi (68.7 km^{2})
  - Water: 0.039 sq mi (0.1 km^{2})
- Elevation: 2,379 ft (725 m)

Population (2020)
  - Total: 431
  - Density: 16.2/sq mi (6.27/km^{2})
- Time zone: UTC-8 (Pacific (PST))
  - Summer (DST): UTC-7 (PDT)
- ZIP code: 99138
- Area code: 509
- FIPS code: 53-33105
- GNIS feature ID: 2408416

Inchelium (Okanagan: N̓čaʔlíwm̓) is a census-designated place (CDP) in Ferry County, Washington, United States on the Colville Indian Reservation. The population was 431 at the 2020 Census.

Inchelium was relocated from an earlier site in the early 1940s. Old Inchelium had been located on the banks of the Columbia River before the construction of the Grand Coulee Dam. As the waters rose behind the dam, the town had to be moved. A description of life in the last years of Old Inchelium and of the move can be found in Lawney Reyes' memoir White Grizzly Bear's Legacy: Learning to be Indian and his history/memoir B Street: The Notorious Playground of Coulee Dam.

Inchelium is the demographic heart of the Inchelium School District and the Confederated Tribes of the Colville Reservation Inchelium Legislative District

== Geography ==
According to the United States Census Bureau, the Inchelium CDP has a total area of 26.5 square miles (68.8 km^{2}), of which, 26.5 square miles (68.7 km^{2}) of it is land and 0.04 square miles (0.1 km^{2}) of it (0.11%) is water.

== Climate ==
According to the Köppen Climate Classification system, Inchelium has a dry summer humid continental climate, abbreviated "Dsb" on climate maps.

Climate data for Inchelium
Month	Jan	Feb	Mar	Apr	May	Jun	Jul	Aug	Sep	Oct	Nov	Dec	Year
Record high °F (°C)	54 (12)	59 (15)	73 (23)	85 (29)	93 (34)	98 (37)	103 (39)	105 (41)	97 (36)	81 (27)	62 (17)	58 (14)	105 (41)
Mean daily maximum °F (°C)	32.6 (0.3)	40.1 (4.5)	49 (9)	60.2 (15.7)	70.6 (21.4)	77.8 (25.4)	85.9 (29.9)	85.1 (29.5)	74.9 (23.8)	58.5 (14.7)	42.4 (5.8)	34.7 (1.5)	59.3 (15.2)
Mean daily minimum °F (°C)	17.9 (−7.8)	21.6 (−5.8)	25.6 (−3.6)	32.5 (0.3)	39.5 (4.2)	45.9 (7.7)	48.7 (9.3)	47.6 (8.7)	41.5 (5.3)	33.6 (0.9)	27.2 (−2.7)	21.4 (−5.9)	33.6 (0.9)
Record low °F (°C)	−26 (−32)	−16 (−27)	−7 (−22)	19 (−7)	20 (−7)	31 (−1)	31 (−1)	32 (0)	25 (−4)	16 (−9)	−1 (−18)	−20 (−29)	−26 (−32)
Average precipitation inches (mm)	2.23 (57)	1.49 (38)	1.43 (36)	1.09 (28)	1.33 (34)	0.95 (24)	0.47 (12)	0.68 (17)	0.89 (23)	1.23 (31)	2.32 (59)	2.68 (68)	16.79 (426)
Average snowfall inches (cm)	18.8 (48)	7.1 (18)	4.2 (11)	0.3 (0.76)	0 (0)	0 (0)	0 (0)	0 (0)	0 (0)	0.1 (0.25)	6.4 (16)	17.9 (45)	54.8 (139)
Average precipitation days	12	8	8	7	8	7	3	4	5	7	12	13	94

== Demographics ==
=== Census 2020 ===
As of the 2020 census, there were 431 people, 184 housing units, and 120 families in the CDP. There were 51 White people, 1 African American, 357 Native American, 7 Asians, and 15 people from two or more races. There were 5 people with Hispanic or Latino origin.

The median age was 35.7 years old. 13.0% of the population were older than 65, with 10.7% between the ages of 65 and 74, 2.0% between the ages of 75 and 84, and 0.3% were older than 85. 6.7% of the population were veterans.

The median household income was $58,125, with families having $76,563, married couples having $132,708, and non-families having $14,896. 18.7% of the population were in poverty, 18.5% of people under 18, 21.1% from the ages 18 to 64, and 8.9% of people over 65 were in poverty.

=== Census 2010 ===
As of the census of 2010, there were 409 people residing in Inchelium.

The racial makeup of the CDP was 78.5% Native American, 14.2% White, 5.6% from two or more races, 1.5% from other races, and 0.2% Native Hawaiian/Pacific Islander. Hispanic or Latino of any race were 5.1% of the population.

Residents under the age of eighteen made up 27.4% of the population versus 72.6% of the population which was eighteen and older.

=== Census 2000 ===
Historical population
Census	Pop.	Note	%±
2000	389		—
2010	409		5.1%
2020	431		5.4%
U.S. Decennial Census

As of the census of 2000, there were 389 people, 153 households, and 95 families residing in the CDP. The population density was 14.7 people per square mile (5.7/km^{2}). There were 168 housing units at an average density of 6.3/sq mi (2.4/km^{2}). The racial makeup of the CDP was 20.31% White, 76.61% Native American, 0.26% from other races, and 2.83% from two or more races. Hispanic or Latino of any race were 1.54% of the population. 6.5% were of German ancestry according to Census 2000. 100.0% spoke English as their first language.

There were 153 households, out of which 30.7% had children under the age of 18 living with them, 32.7% were married couples living together, 18.3% had a female householder with no husband present, and 37.3% were non-families. 32.0% of all households were made up of individuals, and 13.7% had someone living alone who was 65 years of age or older. The average household size was 2.54 and the average family size was 3.31.

In the CDP, the age distribution of the population shows 29.6% under the age of 18, 9.8% from 18 to 24, 26.5% from 25 to 44, 23.7% from 45 to 64, and 10.5% who were 65 years of age or older. The median age was 33 years. For every 100 females, there were 103.7 males. For every 100 females age 18 and over, there were 110.8 males.

The median income for a household in the CDP was $24,375, and the median income for a family was $42,000. Males had a median income of $37,292 versus $23,194 for females. The per capita income for the CDP was $14,728. About 11.0% of families and 13.4% of the population were below the poverty line, including 4.8% of those under age 18 and 26.3% of those age 65 or over.
