= List of Washington wildfires =

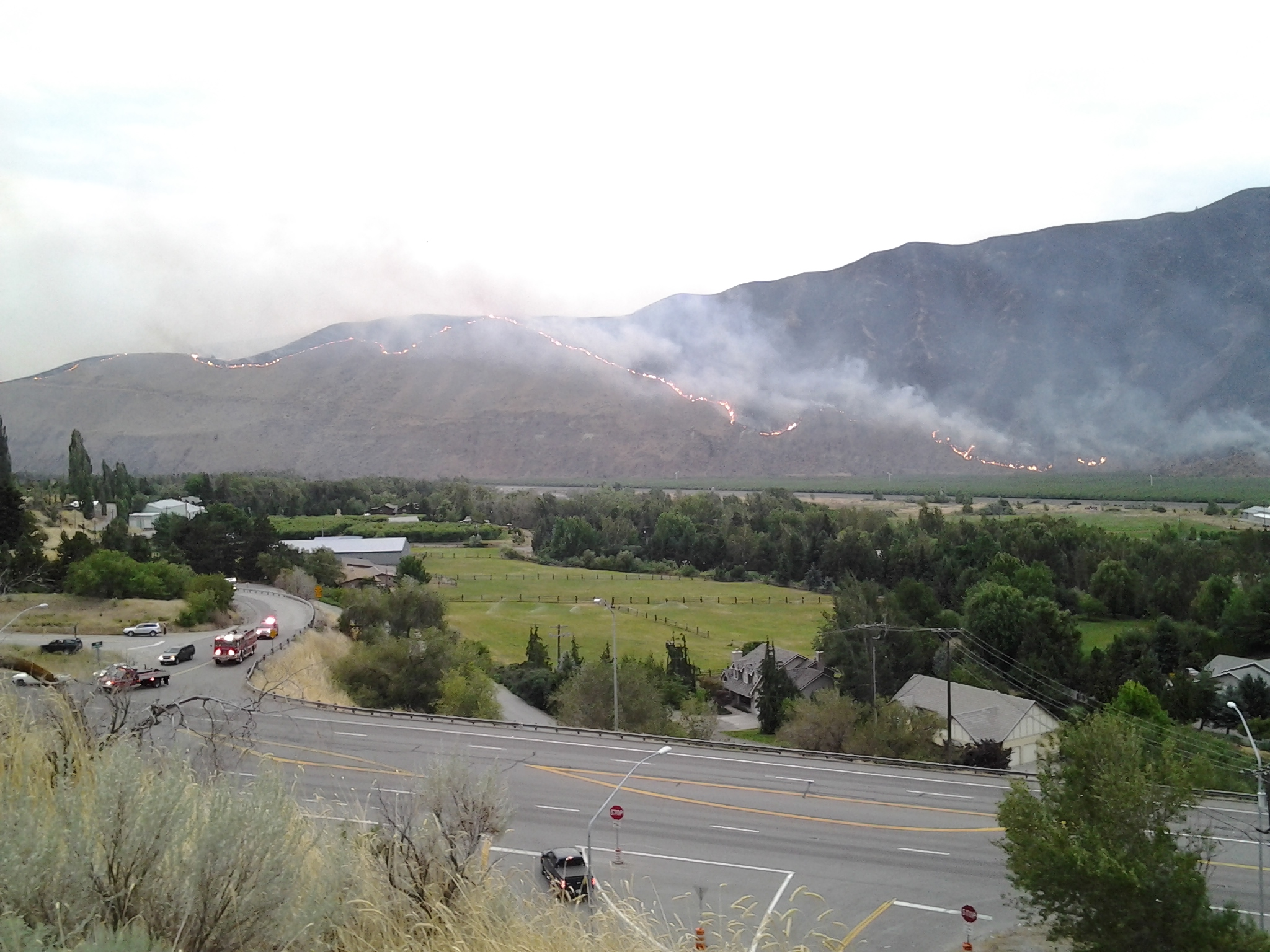
Sleepy Hollow Fire (2015) in Monitor, close to where it was ignited, heading over the ridge and into the city of Wenatchee

These are incomplete lists of the major and minor wildfires in Washington state history, along with total costs of the fires for the years, starting in 2002. Wildfires are infrequent on the western side of the Cascade Crest, but a regular component of Eastern Washington ecology.

== Background ==
While the typical "fire season" in Washington varies every year based on weather conditions, most wildfires occur in between July and October. However, hotter, drier conditions can allow wildfires to start outside of these boundaries. Wildfires tend to start at these times of the year after moisture from winter and spring precipitation dries up. Vegetation and overall conditions are the hottest and driest in these periods. The increase of vegetation can make the fires spread easier.

== Major Washington wildfires chronologically ==
This list only includes "major fires" that destroyed over 5,000 acres (20 km^{2}), incurred fatalities or damaged a significant amount of property. Older fires are increasingly underreported. For example, none of the wildfires of 1926–31 and 1943 that together destroyed more than 500,000 acres of the Colville National Forest are included.

=== 2020s ===
Year	Fire name	Complex name	County	Start date Cause	Size (acres)	Structures lost	Deaths	Injuries	Notes	Image
2026	Upriver		Spokane	June 16; Human	213 acres (86 ha)	14 primary, 4 outbuildings	1	0	In the city of Spokane	Firefighters near retardant drop
2026	Little Giant		Chelan	July 15 Lightning	70,853 acres (28,673 ha)				Ongoing	The large smoke plume from the Little Giant fire on July 24
2026	Kaiser Canyon		Okanogan	July 16; Lightning	over 100,000 acres					Kaiser Canyon Fire at dusk, July 23
2026	Modrite		Ferry	July 17 Lightning	51,836 acres (20,977 ha)				Ongoing	Firefighters standing near the Modrite fire
2026	Sinlahekin		Okanogan	July 26 Undetermined	115,514 acres (46,747 ha)				Ongoing	Northwest Helicopters Sikorsky UH-60A Black Hawk firefighting helicopter, "Bumblebee" working with the incident team fighting the Sinlahekin Fire.
2026	Old Trails	Spokane	Spokane	August 1 Human (arson)	3,584 acres (1,450 ha)	≥700			Ongoing, hundreds of structures in Spokane have been lost.	Panorama view of smoke from several ongoing fires across Spokane County, including the Old Trails fire on August 1
2025	Bear Gulch		Mason	July 6 Human	20,233 acres (8,188 ha)	0	0	0	Contained November 12	Smoke visible over Seattle, obscuring the Olympic Mountains
2025	Hope		Stevens	July 8 Human	8,177 acres (3,309 ha)	2 residential 20 outbuildings	0	0	Contained August 9	Smoke plume over the Columbia River
2025	Western Pines		Lincoln	July 9 Human	5,781 acres (2,339 ha)	47	0	0	Contained July 18.	
2025	Burdoin		Klickitat	July 18; Under investigation	10,675 acres (4,320 ha)	44	0	1	Prompted evacuations for 900 residents in Lyle.	Burn scar from the fire along the Columbia River
2025	Central Ferry		Whitman	August 13; Motorhome fire	6,597 acres (2,670 ha)	0	0	0	Closed State Route 127.	
2025	Wildcat		Yakima	August 25; Lightning	15,592 acres (6,310 ha)	0	0	0	Actively burning. 5% contained.	Fire on September 4
2025	Crown Creek	Crown Creek Complex	Stevens	August 29; Lightning	14,198 acres (5,746 ha)	0	0	0	Prompted evacuations near Marble.	Smoke column on September 4
2025	Lower Sugarloaf		Chelan	September 1 Lightning	42,980 acres (17,390 ha)	0	0	0	Actively burning. 90% contained.	Fire viewed at sunset on September 16
2025	Rattlesnake		Ferry	September 1 Lightning	21,985 acres (8,897 ha)	0	0	0	Burned 2 miles (3.2 km) west of Seven Bays.	
2025	Labor Mountain		Kittitas	September 1 Lightning	42,809 acres (17,324 ha)	0	0	0	Prompting evacuations 10 miles (16 km) north of Cle Elum.	Fire on October 5
2025	Lynx Mountain		Ferry	September 2 Human	9,226 acres (3,734 ha)	0	0	0	Actively burning. 96% contained.	
2024	Pioneer Fire		Chelan	June 8, human caused	36,763 acres (14,877 ha)	0	0	0	Stehekin ordered to evacuate on July 28	7-24-24 map of fire perimeter
2024	Beam Road Fire		Yakima	June 15	8,542 acres (3,457 ha)	0	0	0	Contained June 19; Extinguished June 27	
2024	Cougar Creek Fire		Asotin & Garfield	July 15, unknown	20,699 acres (8,377 ha)	4 destroyed 5 damaged	0	0		7-24-24 map of fire perimeter
2024	Swawilla Fire		Ferry & Okanogan	July 17, Lightning	53,462 acres (21,635 ha)	2 outbuildings	0	0	Temporarily closed State Route 21 and Keller Ferry, evacuations of Keller and the Buffalo Lake area; August 1 a false news story was circulated about 28 homes being burned, Inciweb and NWCC debunked.	Fire perimeter map for 7-23-24
2024	Big Horn Fire		Klickitat	July 22, unknown	51,569 acres (20,869 ha)	0	0	0	Contained July 31	
2024	Black Canyon Fire		Yakima	July 22, unknown	9,211 acres (3,728 ha)	0	0	0	Contained August 1	DNR helicopter dipping from Wenas Lake
2024	Retreat Fire		Yakima	July 23, cause unknown	44,588 acres (18,044 ha)	5	0	0	Also called the Rimrock Retreat Fire, closed US-12, caused evacuations and county-wide declaration of emergency	7-27-24 map of fire perimeter
2023	Oregon Fire		Spokane/Pend Oreille	August 18 Human	10,817 acres (4,377 ha)	384	1			
2023	Gray Fire		Spokane	August 18 Sparks from a faulty light	10,085	259	1			
2020	Cold Springs Canyon/Pearl Hill Fires	Labor Day fires and Inchelium Complex	Okanogan & Douglas	September 6 (Cold Springs), September 7 (Pearl Hill) Both causes were undetermined	Over 410,000		1			
2020	Whitney Fire		Lincoln	September 7	127,430					

=== 2010s ===
Year	Fire name	Complex name	County	Start date	Size (acres)	Structures lost	Deaths	Injuries	Notes	Image
2019	243 Command Fire		Grant	June 3	20,380 acres (82.5 km^{2})	0	0	0	Fully contained by June 10	Satellite view taken June 4, 2019
2019	Cold Creek Fire		Benton		42,000 acres (170 km^{2})					
2019	Pipeline Fire		Kittitas		6,515 acres (26.37 km^{2})					
2019	Powerline Fire		Grant		7,800 acres (32 km^{2})					
2019	Williams Flats Fire		Okanogan		44,446 acres (179.87 km^{2})				Largest wildfire of the 2019 season	
2016	Hart Fire		Lincoln		18,220	39	0			
2016	Range 12 Fire		Yakima		177,210					
2016	Snake River Fire		Garfield		11,452 acres (46.34 km^{2})					
2016	Spokane Complex Fire	Spokane Complex	Spokane		7,251 acres (29.34 km^{2})	10			Formed from the Wellesley and Yale Road fires Contained August 12	Water drop run August 21
2015	Black Canyon Fire	Chelan Complex	Chelan	August 14	6,761					
2015	Blue Creek Fire		Walla Walla	July 20	6,004					
2015	Carpenter Road Fire		Stevens	August 14	63,972	36				
2015	Chelan Complex	Chelan Complex	Chelan	August 14	88,985	44			The complex included the Antoine, Black Canyon, Cagle, McFarland Creek, and Reach fires.	
2015	Cougar Creek Fire		Yakima	August 10	53,523	0	0			Firefighter and flames
2015	Douglas County Complex (Note: Complex of two fires.)	Douglas County Complex	Douglas	July 10	22,337	0	0	0	Contained July 15	
2015	First Creek Fire		Chelan	August 14	7,490	19				
2015	Goodell Fire	Upper Skagit Complex	Skagit	August 10	7,111	0	0			
2015	Graves Mountain fire	Colville & Kettle	Ferry	August 14	8,557				Largest and main fire of the Colville Complex Fires. After containment of smaller fires, oversight was transferred to the Kettle Complex on Aug 31, 2015.	
2015	Grizzly Bear Complex	Grizzly Bear Complex	Columbia / Wallowa, Oregon	August 13	80,725	33			Complex started August 13 via 18 lightning-caused fires. All but the Bear Ridge Fire in the North burned together.	Smoke column from fires
2015	Highway 8 Fire		Klickitat	August 10	33,100					
2015	Lime Belt Fire	Okanogan Complex	Okanogan	August 15	133,450					
2015	Newby Lake Fire		Okanogan	July 4	5,065 (Note: Excludes acreage in British Columbia.)					
2015	North Star Fire		Ferry / Okanogan		218,138					
2015	Okanogan Complex	Okanogan Complex	Okanogan	August 15	304,782	195	3		Included the Lime Belt, Tunk Block, Twisp River and Nine Mile Fires. The Lime Belt Fire originated as three separate fires that burned together. On August 31, the Tunk Block fire was separated from this complex, as it was about to merge with the North Star Fire, leaving the complex with an area of 133,118 acres.	Smoke near Omak
2015	Paradise Fire		Jefferson	May 15	2,796	0	0		A rare rainforest fire in the Olympic National Park finally extinguished in September	Smoke plume
2015	Renner Fire	Kettle Complex	Ferry	August 11	13,775	0	0	0		
2015	Saddle Lakes Fire		Grant	June 28	14,357	0	0	0		
2015	Sleepy Hollow Fire		Chelan	June 28	2,950	33	0	4		Cresting ridge towards Wenatchee
2015	Stickpin Fire	Kettle Complex	Ferry	August 11	53,828	0	0	0		
2015	Tower Fire	Kaniksu Complex	Pend Oreille	August 11	24,194					
2015	Tunk Block Fire	Okanogan Complex	Okanogan	August 15	165,918					
2015	Twisp River Fire	Okanogan Complex	Okanogan	August 15	11,222		3			
2015	Wolverine Fire		Chelan	August 13	65,512	4				Satellite view of smoke August 2015
2014	Carlton Complex fire	Carlton Complex	Okanogan		256,108	300	1		Began as four separate lightning strike fires (the Cougar Flat, French Creek, Gold Hike, and Stokes fires). The four merged and continued as one large fire complex.	Satellite image July 18, 2014
2014	Chiwaukum Creek Fire	Chiwaukum Complex	Chelan	July 14	13,895	0	0			
2014	Duncan Fire		Chelan	July 14	12,695	0	0			
2014	Devil's Elbow Complex (Note: Complex of four fires.)	Devil's Elbow Complex	Ferry	August 2	26,349	0	0			
2014	Mills Canyon Fire		Chelan	July 8	22,571	0	0			
2014	Snag Canyon Fire		Kittitas	August 2	12,667	0	0			
2014	Upper Falls Fire		Okanogan	August 2	8,118	0	0			
2013	Colockum Tarps Fire		Chelan / Kittitas	July 27	80,184	5	0	3		
2013	Desmarais Fire		Yakima	June 6	10,130	0	0	1		
2013	Mile Marker 28 Fire		Klickitat	July 24	26,092	0	0	6		
2013	Wood Gulch Fire		Klickitat		5,400	0	0	0		
2012	Antoine 2 Fire		Chelan / Okanogan		6,837	0	0	0		
2012	Apache Pass Fire		Lincoln		23,324	4	0	0		
2012	Barker Canyon Complex	Barker Canyon Complex	Douglas		81,155	12	0	0		
2012	Buffalo Lake Road Fire		Okanogan		11,299	1	0	5		
2012	Byrd Fire	Wenatchee Complex	Chelan		14,119	0	0			
2012	Canyon Fire	Wenatchee Complex	Chelan		7,557	0	0			
2012	Cascade Creek Fire		Skamania / Yakima		20,296	0	0	2		
2012	Crane Road Fire		Douglas		12,500	7	0	0		
2012	Goat Fire		Okanogan		7,378	0	0	0		
2012	Milepost 10		Douglas		5,445	0	0	0		
2012	Peavine Canyon Fire	Wenatchee Complex	Chelan / Kittitas		19,467	0	0			
2012	Poison Canyon Fire	Wenatchee Complex	Chelan		5,910	0	0			
2012	St Marys Mission Road Fire		Okanogan		17,031	10	0	4		
2012	Table Mountain Fire		Kittitas		42,312	5	0	2		
2012	Taylor Bridge Fire		Kittitas		23,500	272	0	2		
2011	Monastery Fire		Klickitat		3,626	113	0	10		
2011	Wishram II Fire		Klickitat		11,008	0	0	0		
2010	Baird Springs Fire		Grant		7,693	0	0	0		
2010	Cowiche Mill Fire		Yakima		5,834	7	0	3		
2010	Eureka Fire		Walla Walla		21,620	2	0	0		
2010	Hubbard Fire		Columbia		11,500	0	0	0		
2010	Swakane Fire		Chelan		19,291	0	0	0		

=== 2000s ===
Year	Fire name	Complex name	County	Start date	Size (acres)	Structures lost	Deaths	Injuries	Notes	Image
2009	Dry Creek Complex	Dry Creek Complex	Benton / Yakima		48,902	2	0	3		
2009	Oden Road Fire		Okanogan		9,607	14	0	3		
2008	Badger Mountain Fire		Chelan / Douglas		15,023	0	0	5		
2008	Cold Springs Fire		Klickitat		7,729	0	0	0		
2008	Columbia River Road Fire		Okanogan		22,115	0	0	1		
2008	Smith Lake Fire		Douglas		12,513	0	0	0		
2008	Spokane Valley Fire		Spokane		1,008	21	0	1	Over 20 buildings lost	
2008	Swanson Lake Fire		Lincoln		19,090	18	0	1		
2007	Domke Lake Fire		Okanogan / Wenatchee		11,900	1	0	2		
2007	Easy Street Fire		Chelan		5,209	1	0	1		
2007	Les Blair Fire		Benton		6,000	0	0	0		
2007	Manila Creek Fire		Ferry		26,805	2	0	3		
2007	Overlook Fire		Franklin / Grant		27,071					
2007	Six Prong Fire	Horse Heaven Complex	Klickitat		20,898	0	0	0		
2007	South Omak Lake Fire		Okanogan		10,500	0	0	0		
2007	Tunk Grade Fire		Okanogan		15,540	19	0	0		
2007	Wautoma Fire		Benton		69,000	0	0	0		
2007	Wood Gulch Fire	Horse Heaven Complex	Klickitat		7,677	0	0	0		
2006	Columbia Complex	Columbia Complex	Columbia / Garfield		109,402	28	0	11		
2006	Flick Creek Fire		Chelan		7,889	0	0	4		
2006	Highlands Fire		Douglas		5,506	0	0	0		
2006	Rocky Ford Fire		Grant		5,000	0	0	0		
2006	Tatoosh Fire	Tatoosh Complex	Okanogan / British Columbia		47,787 (Note: The Tatoosh Complex burned 51,671 acres in total, of which 37,506 acres were within Washington State.)	0	0	0		
2006	Tinpan Fire		Chelan		9,252	0	0	6		
2006	Tripod Complex Fire	Tripod Complex (Note: The Tripod Fire (45,053 acres) and Spur Peak Fire (62,173 acres) burned together on August 19, 2006, and continued to grow as one fire until October 3.)	Okanogan		175,184	2	0	7		
2005	McClane Fire		Franklin		6,000	2	0	0		
2005	School Fire		Columbia / Garfield		51,892	215	0	1		Satellite view August 10
2005	Walker Canyon Fire		Walla Walla		25,000	0	0	0		
2005	Wall Lake Fire		Lincoln		5,400	3	0	1		
2005	West Omak Lake Fire		Okanogan		11,325	0	0	0		
2004	Deep Harbor Fire	Pot Peak/Sisi Ridge Complex	Chelan		28,500	3	0			
2004	Pot Peak Fire	Pot Peak/Sisi Ridge Complex	Chelan		17,190	0	0	6		
2003	Fawn Peak Complex	Fawn Peak Complex	Okanogan		81,343	0	0	4		
2003	Hatten Road Fire		Lincoln		5,460	0	0	0		
2003	Juniper Dunes Fire		Franklin		5,200	0	0	0		
2003	McGinnis Flats Fire		Ferry		2,245	2	1	1	One reported death	
2003	Needles Fire		Okanogan		21,300	1	0	5		
2003	Rattlesnake Canyon Fire		Ferry		10,560	11	0	2		
2003	Togo Fire		Ferry		5,800	0	0	0		
2002	Deer Point Fire		Chelan / Okanogan		43,375	5	0	0		
2002	Pumphouse Fire		Yakima		10,412	0	0	0		
2002	Quartz Mountain Complex	Quartz Mountain Complex	Okanogan		12,144	0	0	0		
2001	Gamble Mills Fire	Brewster & Virginia Lake Complex	Okanogan		5,550	0	0			
2001	Mount Leona Fire	Mount Leona Complex fires	Ferry	August 13	6,144				One subfire in the complex, the Sleepy Fire/Sleepy 91 Fire	Sunset over the Okanogan Highlands
2001	Rex Creek Fire	Rex Creek Complex fires	Chelan / Okanogan		50,000					
2001	St. Mary's Mission Fire	Virginia Lake Complex	Okanogan		32,980	0	0			
2001	Thirtymile Fire		Okanogan		9,324	0	4	14		
2001	Virginia Lake Fire	Virginia Lake Complex	Okanogan		36,680	9	0	1(+)		
2000	24 Command Fire		Benton		192,000	36	0	0		
2000	Alderdale Fire		Klickitat		6,180	0	0			
2000	Buffalo Lake Fire		Okanogan		9,300	0	0			
2000	Cayuse Fire		Okanogan		5,460	0	0			
2000	Goodnoe Hills Fire		Klickitat		6,510	1	0			
2000	Mule Dry Fire		Benton, Klickitat & Yakima		76,800	1	0	0		
2000	Rocky Hull Fire		Okanogan		9,404	37	0			

=== 1900–1999 ===
Year	Fire name	Complex name	County	Start date	Size (acres)	Structures lost	Deaths	Injuries	Notes	Image
1998	Cleveland Fire		Klickitat		18,500	11	0			
1998	Rattle Snake Ridge Fire		Yakima		18,000					
1997	Olympia Command Fire		Benton		5,500					
1997	Pow Wah Kee Fire	August 3	Asotin		8,000					
1996	Baird Springs Fire		Grant	August 2	14,000					
1996	Cold Creek Fire		Benton / Yakima		57,000					
1994	Copper Butte Fire		Ferry		10,473					
1994	Rat Creek / Hatchery Creek Fire		Chelan		43,000					
1994	Tyee Creek Fire		Chelan		135,000	37				
1992	Castlerock Fire		Wenatchee		3,500	24				
1992	Skookum Fire		Klickitat		51,000					
1988	Dinkelman Fire		Chelan		50,000					
1988	Limekiln Fire		Asotin		8,400					
1988	South 17 Fire	South 17 Complex	Ferry		9740				Included the Cody Butte Fire	
1988	White Mountain Fire	White Mountain Complex	Ferry	August 23	21,717				Included the Sherman Fire	
1987	Hangman Hills Fire		Spokane		1,500	24	2		Two deaths recorded for fire	
1985	Barker Mountain Fire		Okanogan		60,000					
1979	Salmon Creek Fire		Okanogan		7,000					
1977	Bonaparate Lake Fire		Okanogan	July 30	1,200–1,600 acres (490–650 ha)	0	0	0	Multiple summer camps threatened around Mount Bonaparte	
1970	Lightning Bust Fire		Chelan / Okanogan		188,000					
1951	Great Forks Fire		Clallam		38,000		0			
1934	Aeneas Creek Fire		Ferry	"Late july"	21,000 acres (8,500 ha)				Not to be confused with the 2001 fire in the same area.	
1929	Camas fire		Chelan		20,000 acres (8,100 ha)				In the Chelan District	
1929	Dollar Mountain Fire		Ferry	August 4	98,000–142,000 acres (40,000–57,000 ha)		1		The northern Kettle River Ranges eastern slopes	Fire damage in the Sherman Creek drainage
1929	Dole Valley fire		Clark / Skamania		227,500 acres (92,100 ha)					
1929	Toats Coulee Fire		Okanogan		80,000 acres (32,000 ha)					
1919	Sunset Fire		Clark / Skamania		26,900 acres (10,900 ha)					
1910	Great Fire of 1910		Pend Oreille / Spokane		150,000 acres (61,000 ha)	Unknown	38	Unknown	Western perimeter fires on one of the largest fires in United States history. The center of the burn was in Idaho and Montana.	
1902	Yacolt Burn	Yacolt Burn	Clark / Skamania / Cowlitz		238,900 acres (96,700 ha)	Unknown	65+	Unknown	A complex of several fires. The majority was as one fire between Carson and Yacolt.	Fire-killed Douglas-fir in 1934

== Minor Washington wildfires chronologically ==
List of minor fires, burning over 1,000 acres (4.0 km^{2}) and under 5,000 acres (20 km^{2}) with no loss of life or significant numbers of structures.

Year	Fire name	Complex name	County	Start date	Size (acres)	Structures lost	Injuries	Notes	Image
2024	Bridge Creek Fire		Ferry	July 19	3,998 acres (1,618 ha)	1	0	Contained August 4	Fire map for July 23
2016	Buck Creek		Chelan	July 22	1,987 acres (804 ha)			Lightning caused	
2015	231 Fire		Stevens		1,138	0	0		
2015	Twenty-One Mile Grade fire		Ferry		2,250	0	0		
2014	Hansel Fire		Chelan		1,016	0	0		
2014	Little Bridge Fire		Okanogan	August 2	4,896	0	0		
2014	Lone Mountain Fire		Chelan	July 14	2,770	0	0		
2012	Cashmere Fire	Wenatchee Complex	Chelan		2,651	0	0		
2012	Highway 141 Fire		Klickitat		1,644	0	0		
2011	Salmon Fire		Okanogan		1,631	0	0		
2010	Highway 8 Fire		Klickitat		2,019	0	0		
2009	Discovery Fire		Okanogan		4,120	0	0		
2009	Rainbow Bridge Fire		Chelan		3,710	0	0		
2005	Dirty Face Fire		Chelan		1,150	0	0		
2005	Second Hud Fire		Okanogan		4,272	0	0		
2005	Weather Station Fire		Grant		4,918	0	0		
2004	Mud Lake Fire		Yakima		4,000	0	0		
2004	Williams Butte Fire	Williams Butte Complex	Chelan & Okanogan		1,257	0	0		
2003	Ahtanum Ridge Fire		Yakima		2,678	0	1		
2003	Ayers Gulch Fire		Asotin		1,334	0	0		
2003	Black Canyon Fire		Stevens		2,280	1	3		
2003	Crystal Creek Fire		Chelan		1,584	0	5		
2003	Isabel Fire		Okanogan		4,535	0	0		
2003	Maple Fire		Chelan		2,500	0	2		
2003	Noca Complex	Noca Complex	Skagit & Whatcom		3,382	0	0		
2003	Paddle Fire		Stevens		1,324	0	0		
2003	Shooting Range Fire		Benton		2,500	0	0		
2003	Square Lake Fire		Chelan		1,097	0	0		
2003	Watt Road Fire		Spokane		1,064	7	0		
2002	Deer Mountain Fire		Chelan		2,281	0	0		Fire equipment and aerial bombardment
2001	Bailey Mountain Fire	Virginia Lake Complex	Okanogan		3,164	0	0		
2001	Goose Lake Fire	Virginia Lake Complex	Okanogan		1,283	0	0		
2001	Libby Fire		Okanogan		3,830	0	0		
2001	North Coppei Fire		Columbia		4,810	0	0		
2001	Union Valley Fire		Chelan		4,700	0	0		
1999	Malot Fire		Okanogan		2,808	0	0		
1997	Red Lake Fire		Stevens		1,151	5	0		
1996	Bowie Road Fire		Spokane		3,020	8	0		
1988	Aeneas Creek Fire		Ferry	August 23	2,300			Same area as the 21,000 acres (8,500 ha) Aeneas Creek Fire of 1934	

== Year-by-year statistics ==
Wildfire seasons are defined by Washington state law as lasting from April 15 through October 15 of each year, allowing for burn bans and other restrictions to be imposed on state lands by the Washington State Department of Natural Resources during that time. According to a North American Seasonal Fire Assessment and Outlook report issued in June 2019, the summer months represent peak fire season.

	Total fires	Total area burned		Structures lost	Fatalities	Injuries	Total cost	Notes	Source
	Total fires	Acres	Hectares	Structures lost	Fatalities	Injuries	Total cost	Notes	Source
2002	1,285	92,742	37,531						
2003	1,373	200,517	81,146						
2004	1,674	92,617	37,481						
2005	998	185,748	75,170						
2006	1,579	410,060	165,950						
2007	1,268	214,925	86,977						
2008	1,303	147,264	59,596						
2009	1,976	77,250	31,260						
2010	870	56,820	22,990						
2011	993	17,480	7,070						
2012	1,342	259,526	105,026						
2013	1,527	152,603	61,756						
2014	1,480	386,972	156,602	300	1				
2015	2,013	1,137,664	460,396	3	4		$253 million		
2016	1,272	293,717	118,863						
2017	1,346	404,223	163,583						
2018	1,743	438,833	177,589						
2019	1,394	169,742	68,692						
2020	1,646	842,370	340,895	181	1				
2021	1,863	674,222	272,848						
2022	1,492	173,659	70,277						
2023	1,707	151,316	61,235					Preliminary data as of October was higher than the end of the season reported numbers.	
2024	1,806	275,593	111,528						NIFC Annual Reports
2025	1,874	247,068	99,984						NIFC Annual Reports
Sources: National Interagency Fire Center
