= Mount Leona Fire =

2001 wildfire in Washington, U.S.

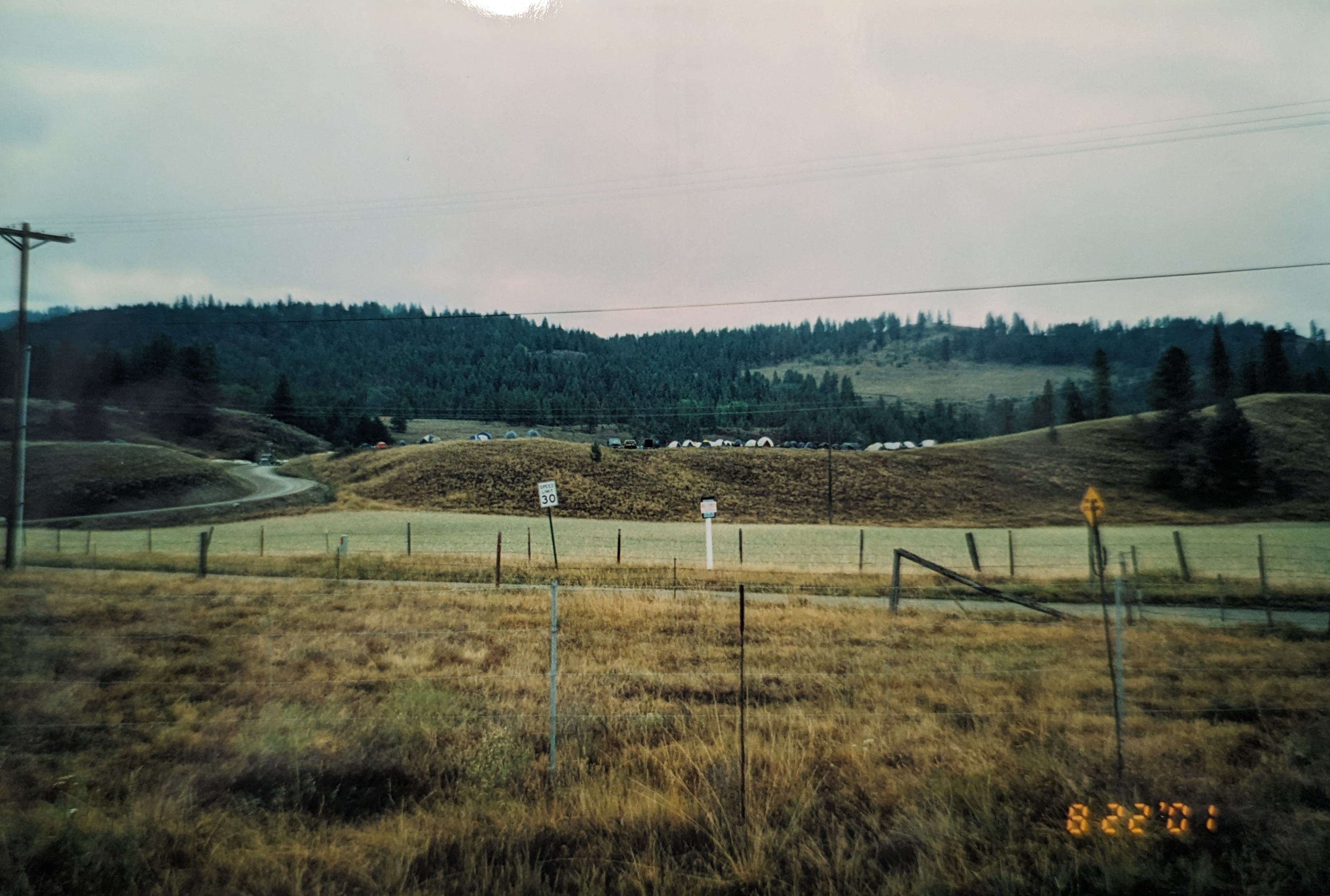
- Mount Leona fire camp along Highway 21
- Date: August 13, 2001 – September 2001
- Location: Kettle River Range; Ferry County, Washington, U.S.
- Coordinates: 48.771°N 118.473°W

Statistics
- Burned area: 4,820–6,144 acres (19.51–24.86 km^{2})
- Land use: Forest

Ignition
- Cause: Lightning strikes

Map
- Location within Washington (state)

The Mount Leona Fire was a wildfire in Ferry County, Washington, in the Kettle River Range, east of Curlew Lake. It was ignited on August 13, 2001, by lightning strikes from a major regional storm that crossed much of eastern Washington. By August 18, the fire was 5% contained, and by August 27, it was 55% due to favorable weather. In the aftermath of the fire, a large-scale timber salvage was attempted; however, only a small fraction was eventually harvested, with economic impacts reported from the failure of the salvage.

== Background ==
Much of northern Ferry County is dominated by temperate coniferous forests maintained by the Colville National Forest and as private land. The forests at the lower elevation are mixed Douglas fir and ponderosa pine, which intergrade into mixed Douglas fir, lodgepole pine, and western larch at mid-elevation and finally into mixed Engelmann spruce, subalpine fir, and lodgepole pine forests at the highest elevations.

The Kettle River Range had a history of large wildfires preceding the Mount Leona fire. In 1988, the White Mountain Fire burned an estimated 21,717 acres (8,789 ha), while the Copper Butte Fire of 1994 burned 10,473 acres (4,238 ha). The Copper Butte Fire notably burned in a northerly direction along the mountains and finally went out on the southern edges of Mount Leona.

The 2001 fire season in Ferry County was marked by 9,397 acres (3,803 ha) of total land burned with 95 separate ignition events recorded across responding agencies.

== Fire ==
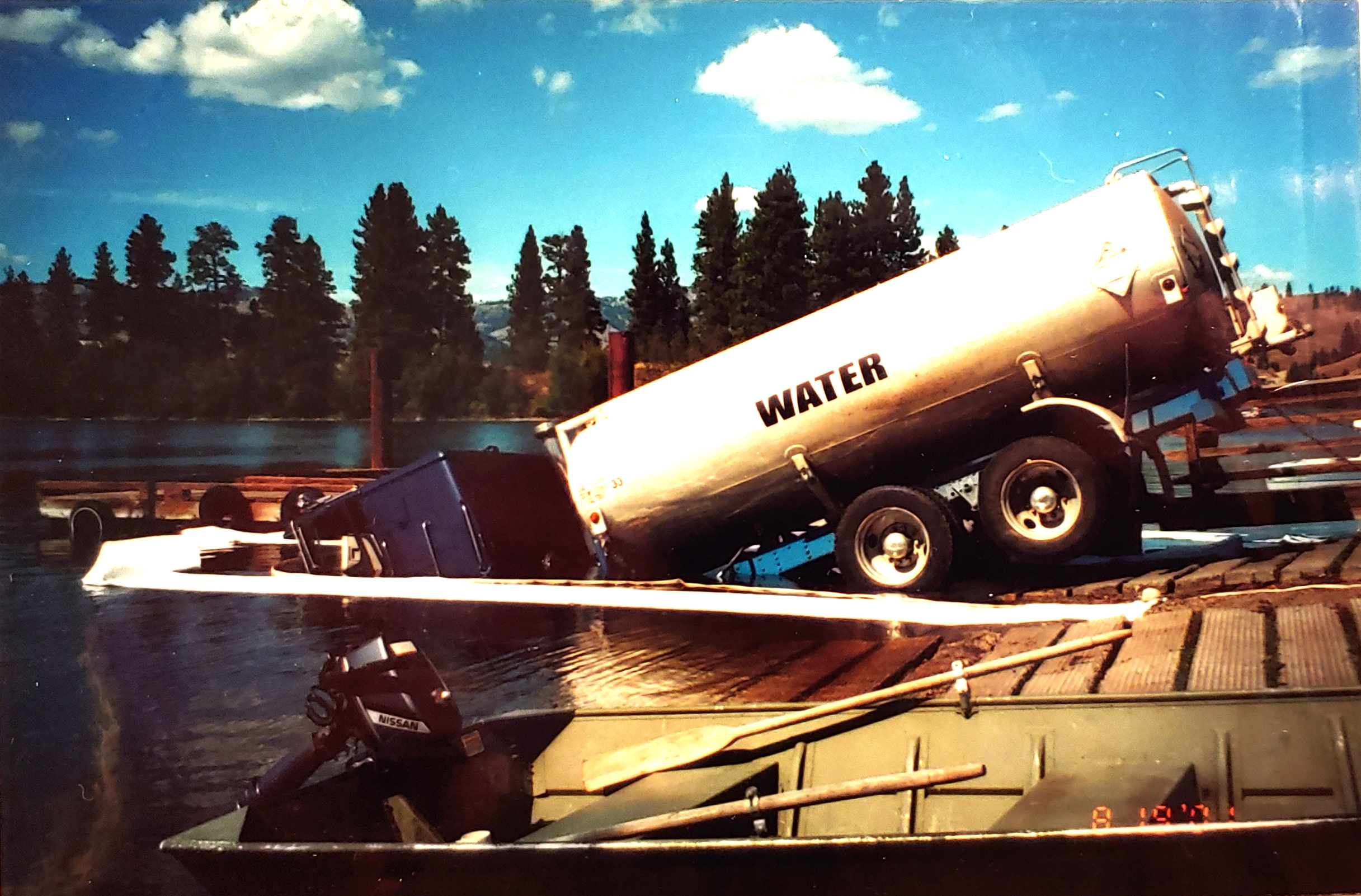
Tanker engines were used for ground level water transport during the fire

On August 13, 2001, a large-scale storm event accompanied by little rain moved over northern Ferry County. The storm left fire response agencies facing a myriad of fires ranging from spot fires up to several-acre blazes. Due to the many incidences, smokejumpers were not available to respond to the Mount Leona fire, which was started on a steep western slope of the mountain by multiple lightning strikes. The fire was in a roadless section of mountain reachable only by a 2-hour hike, and by the time fire crews arrived two smaller fires were already in close proximity. Mount Leona was deemed one of 7 major fire and fire complexes started the week of August 12, 2001, by the storm system.

The weather remained hot and windy, which, combined with the dangerous terrain, prevented the fire crews from surrounding and suppressing the blazes. When air support arrived, it was not able to prevent rapid spreading due to uphill runs, ember-started spot fires, and rolling embers traveling downslope. After initial escape from fire crews, the fire rapidly ran upslope to the crest of Mount Leona and started to progress down the northside into the North Fork Saint Peters Creek drainage. Over a number of days, bulldozer crews built fire breaks along the western flanks of Mount Leona on private land, while the fire progression in the Saint Peters Creek drainage basin appeared likely to be controlled. An ember driven by evening southwesterly winds jumped over the North Fork and ignited the south slope of Tonasket Mountain. This led to a run up to the ridgeline peak of the mountain, an increase of 1,500 acres (610 ha). The weather and fire behavior finally settled enough to contain the blaze along the upper slopes of Profanity Peak and in the uppermost reach of the Long Alec Creek headwaters.

It was reported on September 1 that the county population had temporarily increased by 2,000 people (more than 25%) as a result of the firefighting efforts. A reported 500 fighters were working on the Sleepy sub-fire, also called the Sleepy 91 fire, of the Leona fire and another 1,467 firefighters and support personnel were working with the main Leona fire. Along with up to 52 fire engines and 2 helicopters, additional firefighters that had been rotated though the Leona fire included a 20 team crew from across Massachusetts.

=== Progression ===
By early August 16, the estimated size of the fire had grown to 500 acres (200 ha), but within a day, the size grew to over 1,400 acres (570 ha) and was only 5% contained. Consistent winds on August 18 drove the fire growth, with a jump from 1,400 acres (570 ha) to 3,000 acres (1,200 ha) in one day. The fire was reported as 6,002 acres (2,429 ha) burned and 25% contained as of August 25 with slowed fire progress due to rain during the prior few days. Rapid progress on containment was continued and by August 27 reported to be at 55%. On September 1, the main Leona fire was up to 6,144 acres (2,486 ha) and covered by a crew of around 1,467 fighters. The fire was deemed fully contained by the first week of September and out of state fire crews were sent home leaving only containment units to monitor the fire remains.

After splitting from the main Leona fire, the Sleepy sub-fire had grown to 1,380 acres (560 ha) by August 24 and was approximately 60% contained. By September 1, the 500 fighters assigned to the subfire had containment up to 91%.

The total reported acreage burnt varies, with some sources conservatively giving as low as only 4,820 acres (1,950 ha), while other sources give a high at or over 6,000 acres (2,400 ha).

== Aftermath ==
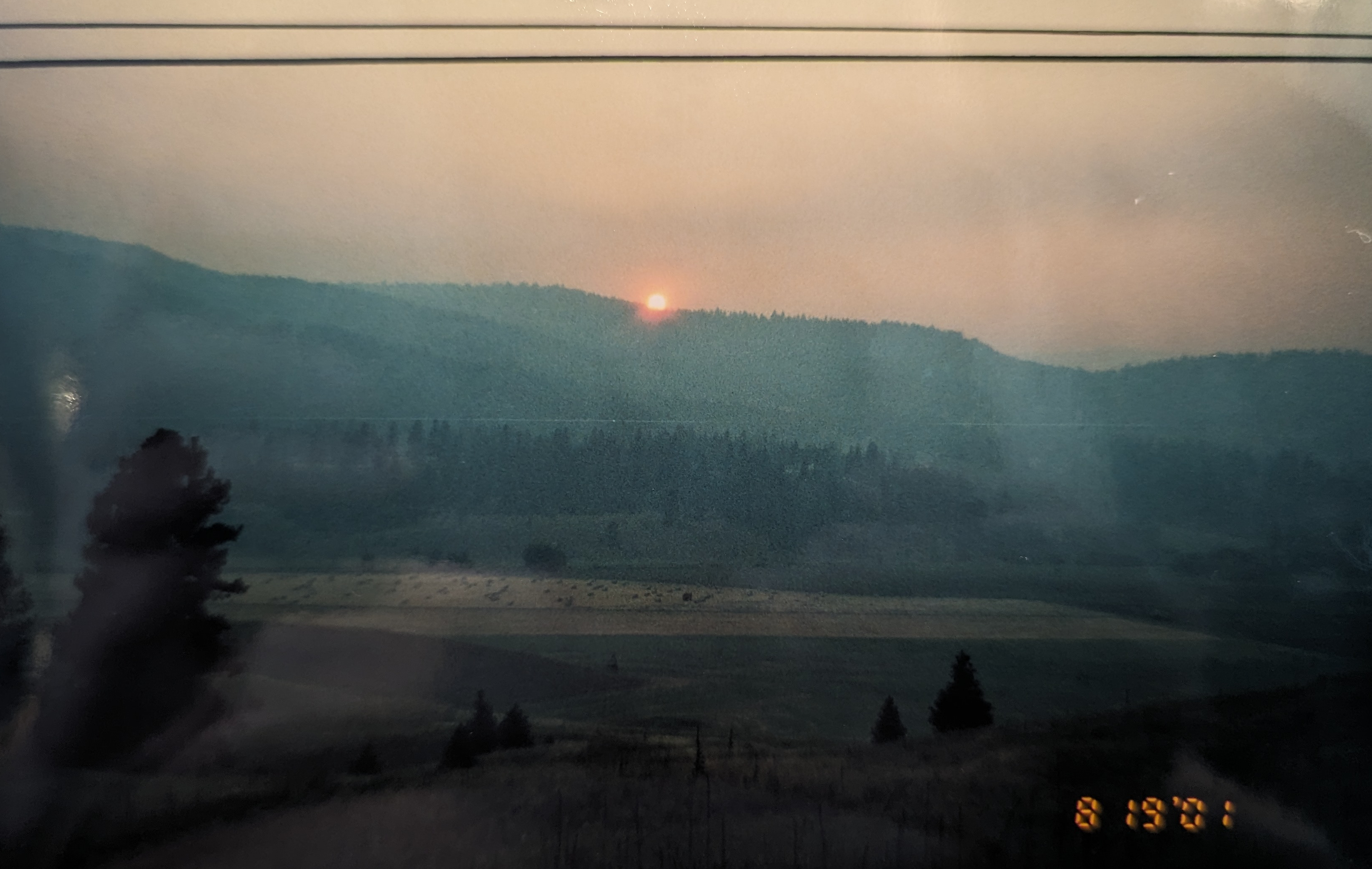
Sunset over Klondike Mountain on August 19 influenced by the heavy smoke

A smoke sample was taken from the fire on August 21, 2001, and studied by Friedli et al (2003) to evaluate fire-emitted atmospheric mercury concentrations. Fire management crews noted the road systems around Saint Peters Creek and across Tonasket Mountain allowed for better management of the fire as it progressed.

After the fire, the U.S. Forest Service assessed the burn area and deemed the salvageable timber to be of limited volume and value. The service decided the paperwork and procedures needed for opening of the burn would not be worth the gained value of any salvage. By the end of 2002, the lumber mill just outside Republic, owned by Vaagan Bros of Colville, was struggling. The mill was the largest private employer in the county at that time; the operators and members of the community held rallies in December 2002 and January 2003 advocating for the release of salvage rights to timber burned during the Leona fires. The second rally, staged on January 18, 2003, attracted 5th district Representative George Nethercutt and United States Department of Agriculture undersecretary Mark Ray. The salvage operations were opposed by the Kettle Range conservation Corps and other groups, and after the first rally, there were calls to boycott businesses that donated to opposition groups; such boycotts never manifested.

The Forest Service finally agreed to salvage harvesting of the Leona burn, but reduced the harvest area to 1.5 million board feet of lumber in 115 acres (47 ha) 11 mi (18 km) northeast of Republic, whereas the originally proposed sale of salvage rights would have been for 500 acres (200 ha) and 2.8 million board feet. According to the Republic mill owners, the lumber garnered was of mixed quality, with the 1.5 million board feet of lumber only producing 1 million board feet of good-quality wood. Many of the lodgepole and hemlock logs were badly cracked and of poor lumber quality, while the fir and larch logs were good quality. At that point all parties were open to an additional timber sale from the burn in July 2003 under the same conditions and restrictions. The second sale of lumber eventually fell through and the Republic Mill closed by July 2003.

An oversight field hearing in Spokane, Washington was held as part of congressional testimony for the US House of Representatives National Environmental Policy Act (NEPA) task force committee on resources on April 23, 2005. During testimony Vaagen Bros. president Duane Vaagen asserted that NEPA was a factor in the reduced amount of timber salvage taken from the Mount Leona and Togo fires.
