= Curlew Lake =

Curlew Lake may refer to any of several locations the United States:

== Lakes ==
- Curlew Lake (Alaska)
- Curlew Lake (New Mexico)
- Curlew Lake (South Dakota)
- Curlew Lake (Washington)

Curlew Lake may also refer to: Curlew Lake Resources
