= Tatoosh =

Tatoosh may refer to:

- Tatoosh (yacht), yacht owned by Paul Allen
- Tatoosh Island, Washington, United States
- Tatoosh Wilderness, Washington, United States
- Tatoosh Range, Washington, United States
- Tatoosh fire, 2006 fire in Washington and British Columbia
