= Republic Graben =

Eocene extensional basin

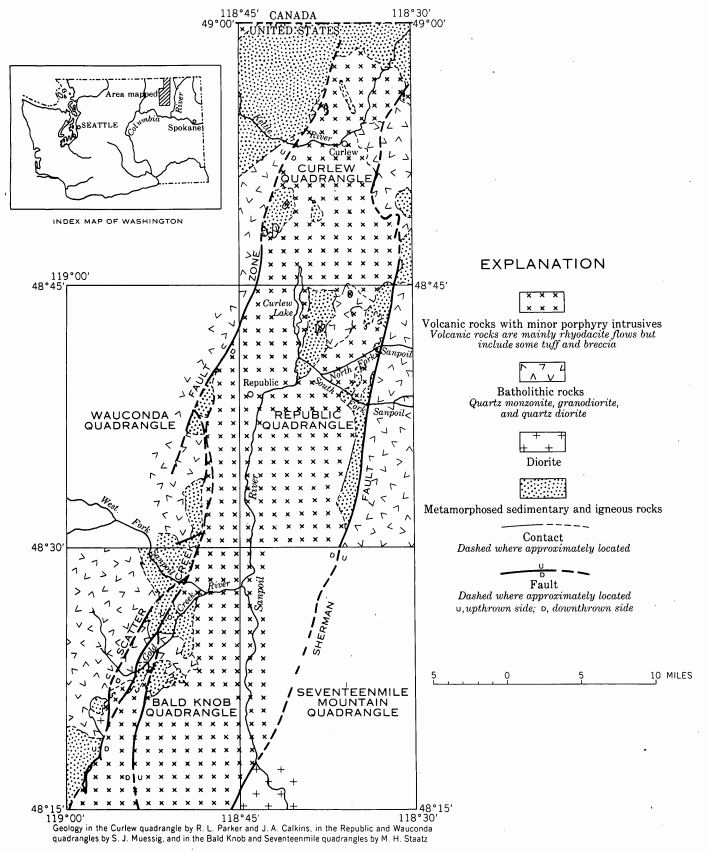
Republic Graben geological map, Washington

The Republic Graben, named after the town of Republic, Washington, is one of a number of Eocene extensional basins in what is now the Okanogan Highlands. Having been down dropped it preserves a thick section of volcanic and minor volcaniclastic rocks (Sanpoil Volcanics, mainly rhyodacite) as well as fossiliferous lacustrine Klondike Mountain Formation deposits. The volcanic rocks represent the eruptive cover of the widespread Eocene granitic intrusions in the region, and formerly must have been much more widespread.

Base and precious metal deposits are widespread in the graben.

The graben projects to the south-southwest under the Miocene basalts in the Columbia Plateau.

The Early Tertiary-Middle Tertiary graben is 4–10 miles (6.4–16.1 km) wide and 52 miles (84 km) long, bounded on the northwest by the Scatter Creek Fault and Bacon Creek Fault, and bounded on the southwest by the Sherman Fault. The middle of the graben is at least 7,000 feet (2,100 m) lower than the surrounding blocks. Eocene-Oligocene rocks which formed as the graben subsided include intrusive porphyry and rhyodacite volcanic flows, with some tuff and breccia. The oldest Tertiary formation in the graben is the O'Brien Creek Formation, which is up to 4,200 feet (1,300 m) thick, and composed tuffaceous rock with volcanic ash and rounded quartz grains. The top of this formation is characterized by an igneous-cemented conglomerate, conformably overlain by the Sanpoil Volcanics, which are about 4,000 feet (1,200 m) thick. Correlated with these volcanics is the Scatter Creek Rhyodacite, which is generally found along the fault zones defining the graben. Eocene and Oligocene ore deposits are found within the Republic mining district.

== Republic Mine ==
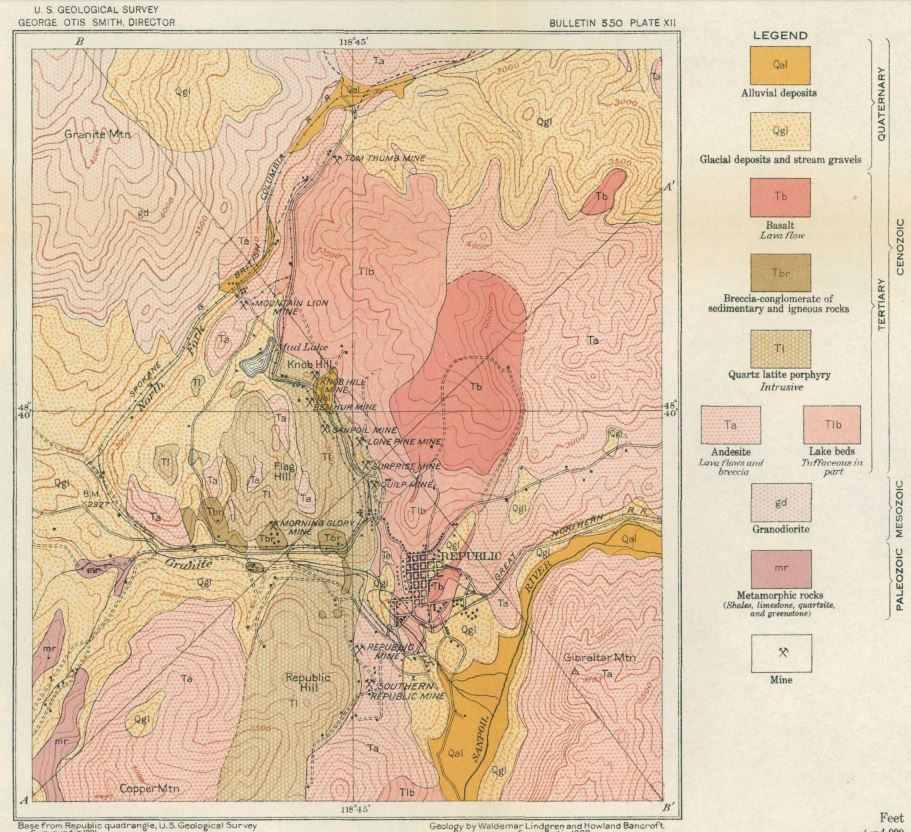
Republic Mining District geological map with mine locations

Mining claims were first made around Republic on 21 February 1896, after the 1891 Treaty was broken and the northern half of the Colville Indian Reservation was taken by the United States Government in 1892. On 5 March, Philip Creasor and Thomas Ryan staked the Republic Mine, which became the chief producer in the mining district. About 20,000 tons of ore was milled during the first 2.5 years of mine operations, before the operation passed from Republic Gold Mining and Milling Co. to the Republic Consolidated Gold Mining Co. The operation was shut down in 1901, then reopened in 1909 by the New Republic Co.
