= Republic, Washington =

- City
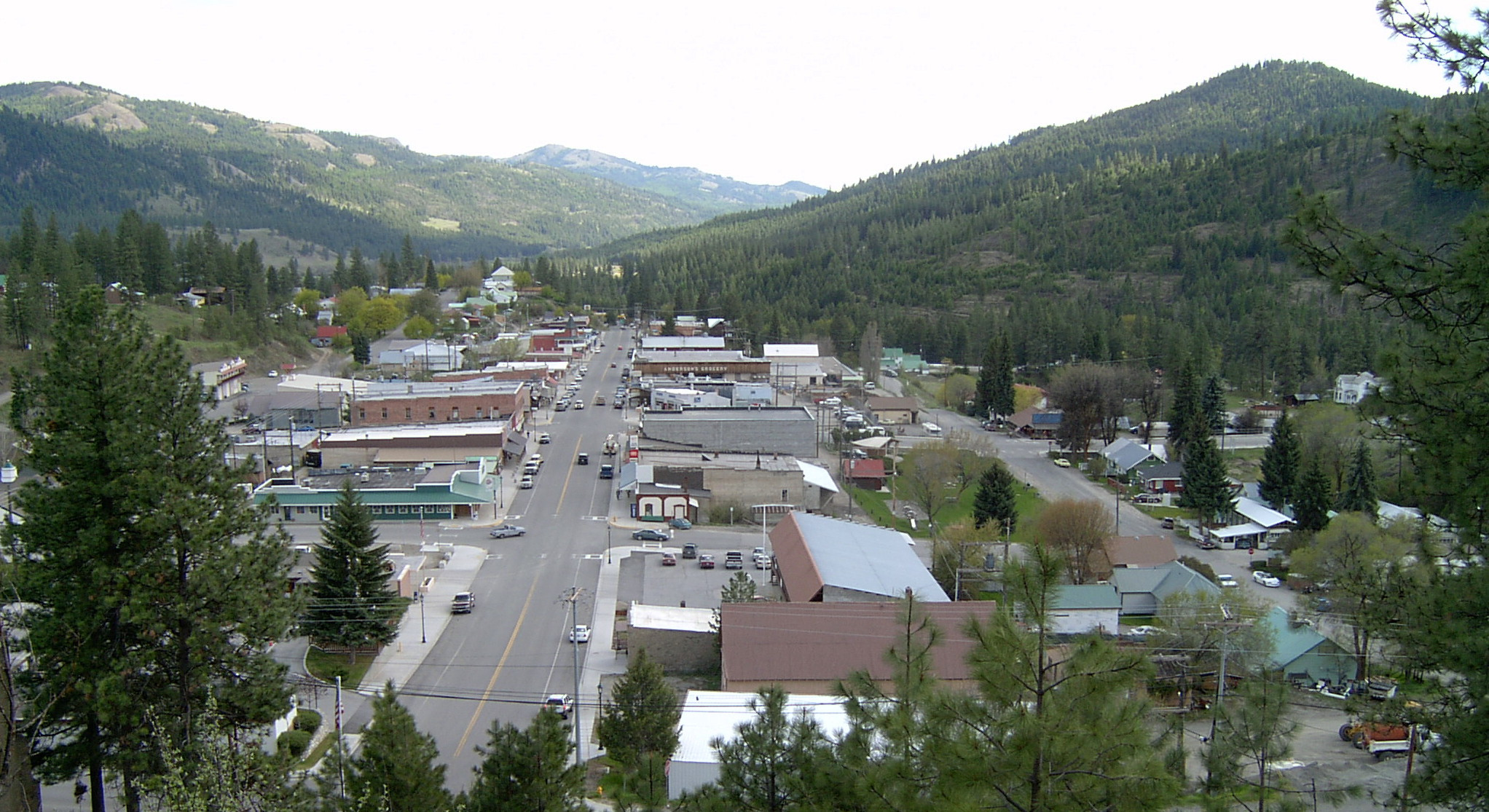

- Location of Republic, Washington
- Coordinates: 48°38′54″N 118°44′06″W
- Country: United States
- State: Washington
- County: Ferry

Government
  - Type: Mayor–council
  - Mayor: Gabriel Becklin

Area
  - Total: 1.42 sq mi (3.68 km^{2})
  - Land: 1.42 sq mi (3.68 km^{2})
  - Water: 0 sq mi (0.00 km^{2})
- Elevation: 2,602 ft (793 m)

Population (2020)
  - Total: 992
  - Density: 698/sq mi (270/km^{2})
- Time zone: UTC−08:00 (Pacific (PST))
  - Summer (DST): UTC−07:00 (PDT)
- ZIP Code: 99166
- Area code: 509
- FIPS code: 53-57850
- GNIS feature ID: 2410927
- Website: cityofrepublic.org

Republic is a city in Ferry County, Washington, United States. The population was 992 at the 2020 census. It is the county seat of Ferry County. It was the largest mining camp in the Republic Mining District, and home to the "Hot Air Line" railway.

== History ==
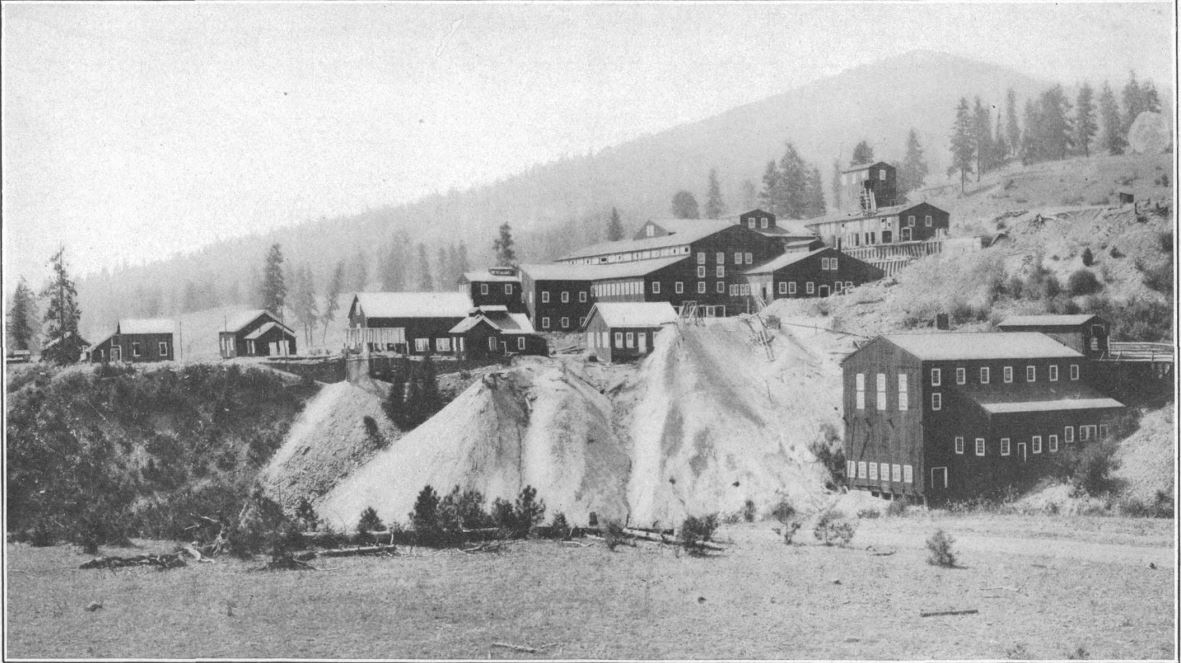
Republic Mill

=== Republic Mining District ===
Republic was founded by gold prospectors in the late 19th century. Mining claims were first made along Eureka Creek on March 1, 1896, after the northern half of the Colville Indian Reservation was vacated on February 21. On March 5, 1896, the Republic claim was staked by Thomas Ryan and Philip Creasor along Granite Creek, another branch of the Sanpoil River. The resulting Republic Mine eventually became the highest producer of gold in the county. On April 18, 1896, the Republic Mining District, originally called the Eureka Mining District, was established.

The first ore mill for processing low grade ore in the district was constructed in May, 1898, while highest grade ores were hauled 80 mi (130 km) east to Marcus, Washington partway by cart and then via the Spokane Falls & Northern branch line for the remaining distance. Between 1899 and 1900, stamp mills were constructed at the Mountain Lion mine in the northwest part of camp and the Republic Mine in the south resulting in a brief period where all of the district's ore was milled in the camp. The Mountain Lion Gold Mining company 100-ton mill used a combination of mercury plate amalgamation followed by MacArthur-Forrest cyanide leaching. However, because of much lower gold and silver recovery rates, combined with the soon to arrive rail lines, the mill was soon shut down. The 200-ton Republic mill processed the ore by first roasting the finely crushed ore, followed by cyanide leaching, with the first loads of ore being processed in October 1900.

In July 1901, the Republic mine and mill both shut down because of the milling cost, and a lack of enough profitable ore being recovered. Ores in the Republic District were noted to have increasing percentages of silver concentration in the lower portions of the ore bodies, and the Republic mill did not provide more than a 50% return on assayed ore value, dooming the mill. The Republic mine remained inactive until 1902 when the arrival of railroads in the town made mining profitable again. From 1902 to 1909, ore was freighted north to British Columbia and then west to smelters on the coast for processing, with periods where shipments up to 1,000 st (6,400 kg) of ore a week were regular.

The Republic mining District encompassing Republic and the surrounding areas, had no defined borders as of 1909 when the geologist Joseph B. Umpleby visited, but included six townships with a center "a little west of the south end of Curlew Lake". At the time of the visit Republic was the most important mining camp in the county and the largest with a population of around 1,500.

=== Eureka to Republic ===
In July 1897, Philip Creasor built a two-story hotel at the townsite, originally called Eureka. This town site was platted on April 29, 1898, and the post office name changed to Republic, since there was already a post office named Eureka in the state of Washington. On May 8, 1900, a special election was held which approved incorporation of Republic, and J.J. Sullivan was elected mayor. The town was then officially incorporated on May 22, 1900, and had a population of about 1800. Two separate rail lines granted access to the area, Great Northern Railways Spokane Falls & Northern branch line and the locally owned Republic and Kettle Valley Railway, commonly called the "Hot air line" from Grand Forks, British Columbia. During the summer of 1900, Swedish immigrant Charles E. Anderson first opened Anderson's Grocery. As a major transportation and communication hub for the Okanogan Highlands, Republic was the headquarters for the Colville National Forest operations in the region. The first group of permanent Forest service fire lookouts were constructed by the end of the 1915 summer and comprised the Mount Bonaparte, First Thought Mountain , Sherman Pass, and Vulcan Mountain. The summer also saw completion of telephone trunk lines east to Kettle Falls and Marcus along with the "farmers lines" of the route. Westward, a trunk line was constructed south to West Fork on the Sanpoil River and then northwest though the Aeneas Valley and Anglin to Tonasket, Washington on the Okanogan River. A farmers branch extended up to Wauconda to the southeast of Mount Bonaparte, and another branch passed west of the mountain to reach Havillah just to the north west.

=== Hot Air Line ===
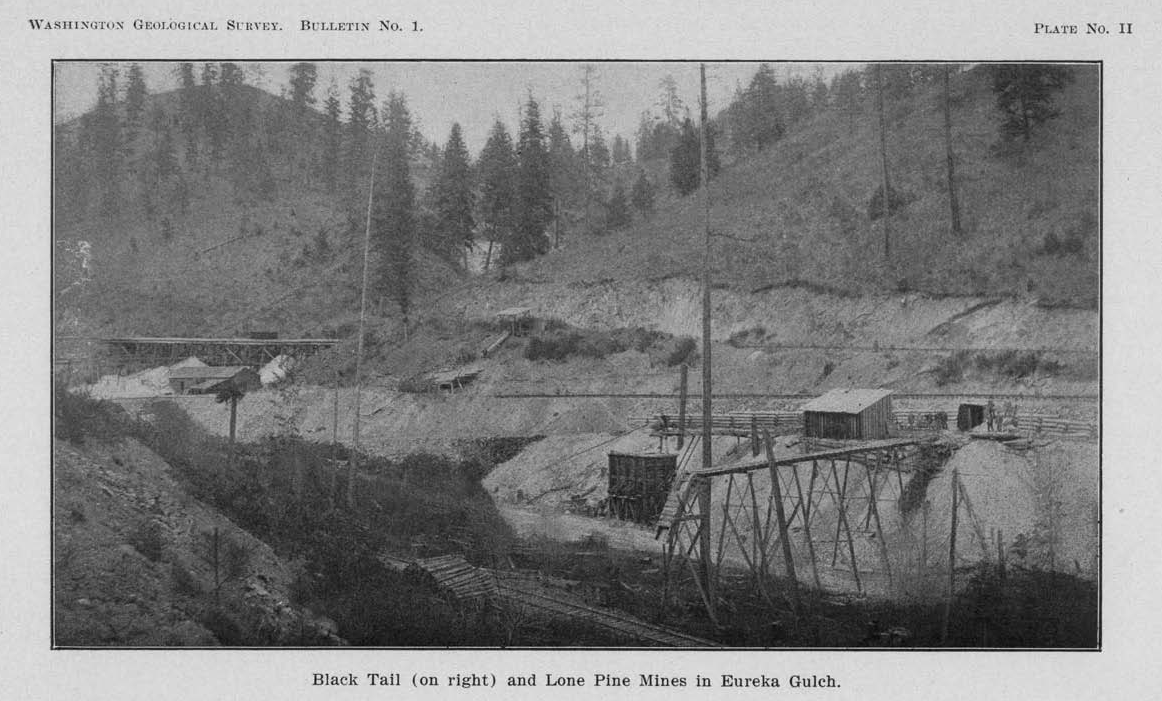
Eureka Gulch in 1910 with the Great Northern railbeds in the center and the "Hot Air Line" in the foreground

The Spokane and British Columbia Railway, originally the Republic and Kettle Valley Railway, was a short lived standard-gauge private rail company based out of Republic operating between Republic, Grand Forks and Lynch Creek British Columbia. The line was locally known as the "Hot Air line". The line began operation in 1902 as the Republic and Kettle Valley Railway, before being bought out in 1916. The company was initially incorporated in 1901 with J. Stratton as president, with construction of the line between Republic and Danville, Washington at the United States-Canadian border being contracted to the Republic and Grand Forks Construction Company, itself owned by Stratton. The rail line paralleled the Great Northern spur line from Republic through Malo and Curlew, Washington to Danville. The northern line was initially surveyed by the Republic and Kettle River company, but they were forced to build on higher ground beyond the Great Northern land boundaries. On January 2, 1902, the railroad was also approved by the Secretary of the Interior to conduct surveying for a southern line though the Colville Indian Reservation along the Sanpoil River.

=== Early entertainment ===
During the early 1900s, Republic was home to a regional baseball team which traveled the northeast region playing other city teams such as those from Colville and Orient, Washington, plus Grand Forks, British Columbia. The city also had a brass band which would play at events such as Fourth of July celebrations which it would host with the baseball club. The Kettle River Journal of Orient reported August 1913 that the Republic Theater had been purchased by a new owner who renovated and remodeled it.

=== 1983 Republic hotel fire ===
On December 4, 1983, around 6pm, fire broke out on north Clarke Ave and raged for over 2 hours before being extinguished. The starting point was thought to have been an upper back room in the Republic Hotel and cafe. It spread for half a block consuming the hotel, the state liquor store, The Republic News-Miner newspaper offices, and an unoccupied building. A radio shop at the south end of the block and a hardware store at the north end were smoke-damaged but spared. Fire crews from Curlew, Malo, Keller, and Tonasket all responded to the blaze.

=== Modern era ===
Republic's prominence, initially brought on by the gold rush, started to fade as prospectors and those who supported the mining industry moved away. During the years between 1900 and 1910, the town lost over half its population. Despite this, mining has continued to be an important part of life in Republic, as gold is still mined for in the mountains surrounding the town. As of 2022, an estimated 8,000,000 oz (220 long tons; 250 short tons) of gold had been recovered from northern Ferry County, with active gold exploration being conducted by Adamera Minerals Corporation who acquired property on Buckhorn Mountain near the Canadian border from Kinross Gold Corporation. As of the 2020s, the town of 1,100 is sustained mainly by those people in surrounding farms and ranches, miners who work at the local mine, and tourists looking for a quieter, slower pace of life.

== Geography ==
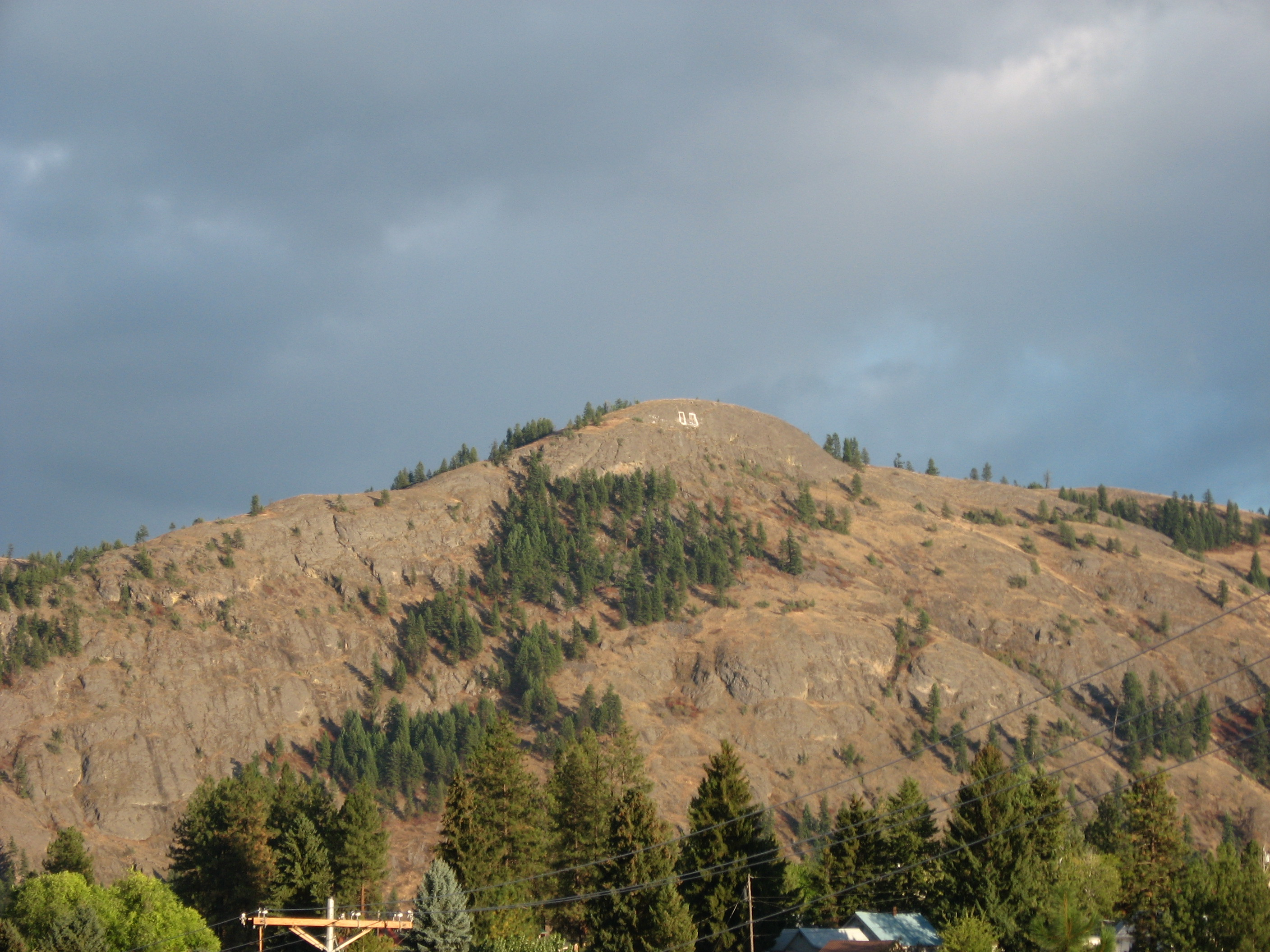
Glacially carved Gibraltar Mountain, overlooking Republic from the southeast

According to the United States Census Bureau, the city has a total area of 1.59 square miles (4.12 km^{2}), all of it land. Republic is located on a low shoulder of Klondike Mountain northwest of the Sanpoil River in a long graben valley. The valley is bordered by the Okanagan Highlands to the west and the Kettle River Range to the east. 1.5 mi (2.4 km) southeast of Republic is Gibraltar Mountain, one of the most prominent features of the area at 3,784 ft (1,153 m), with its precipitous western face overlooking the town and the Sanpoil Valley.

=== Climate ===
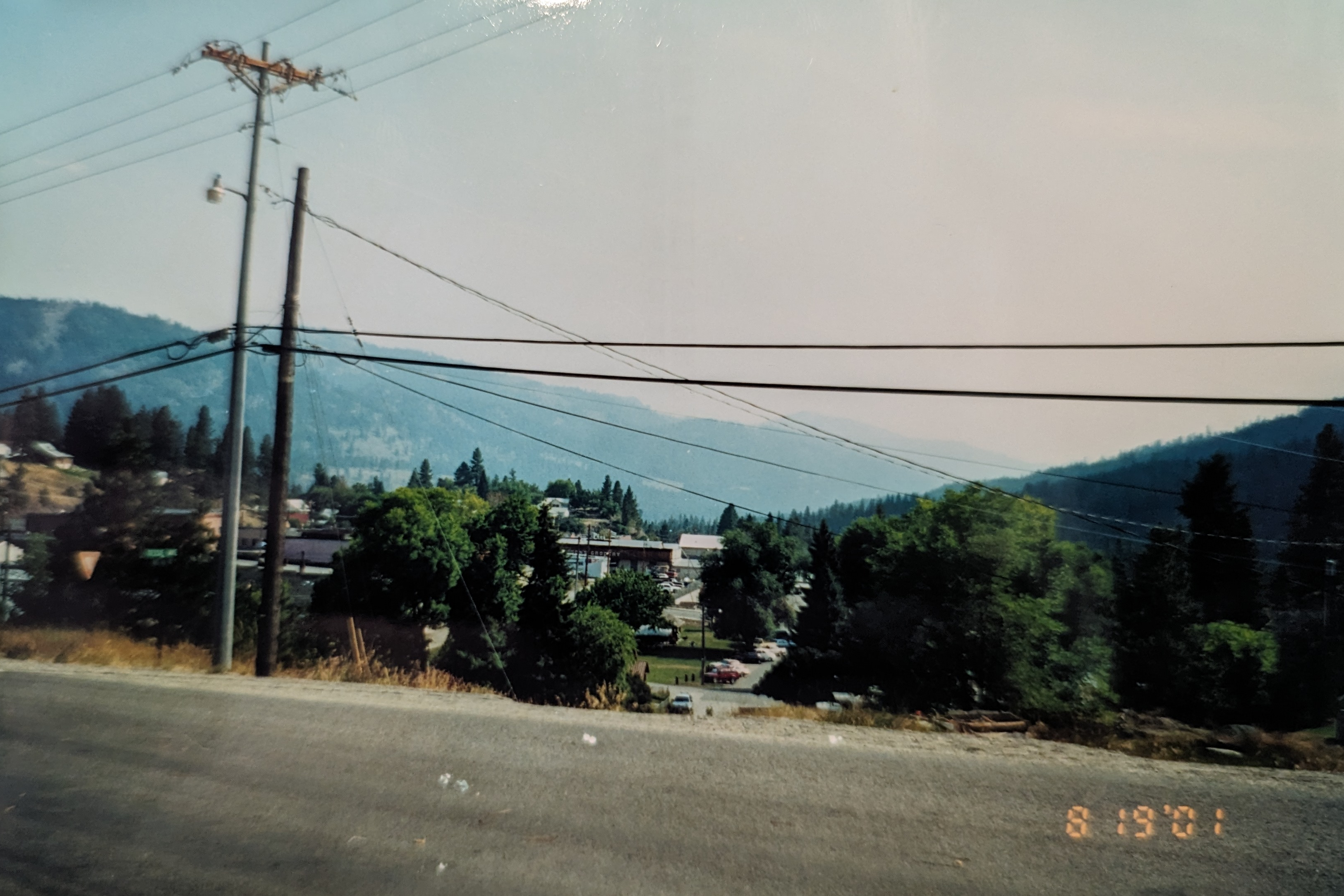
Smoke from the 2001 Mount Leona Fire shrouding Republic

Republic experiences a humid continental climate (Köppen Dfb) with cold winters, warm summers and fairly even precipitation year-round, with a drying trend in summer, though there is a secondary uptick in rainfall from April through June, unlike in much of the rest of the state.

Climate data for Republic, Washington, 1991–2020 normals, extremes 1899–2023: 2555ft (779m)
Month	Jan	Feb	Mar	Apr	May	Jun	Jul	Aug	Sep	Oct	Nov	Dec	Year
Record high °F (°C)	53 (12)	58 (14)	77 (25)	89 (32)	96 (36)	109 (43)	108 (42)	105 (41)	98 (37)	87 (31)	65 (18)	61 (16)	109 (43)
Mean maximum °F (°C)	43.1 (6.2)	48.5 (9.2)	62.6 (17.0)	74.1 (23.4)	83.5 (28.6)	88.9 (31.6)	95.7 (35.4)	96.2 (35.7)	88.6 (31.4)	73.1 (22.8)	52.7 (11.5)	42.3 (5.7)	97.7 (36.5)
Mean daily maximum °F (°C)	31.1 (−0.5)	38.2 (3.4)	48.6 (9.2)	58.2 (14.6)	67.9 (19.9)	73.9 (23.3)	84.1 (28.9)	84.0 (28.9)	74.1 (23.4)	56.9 (13.8)	39.7 (4.3)	30.2 (−1.0)	57.2 (14.0)
Daily mean °F (°C)	23.6 (−4.7)	27.9 (−2.3)	36.3 (2.4)	43.8 (6.6)	52.5 (11.4)	58.1 (14.5)	65.3 (18.5)	64.6 (18.1)	56.0 (13.3)	43.2 (6.2)	31.5 (−0.3)	23.1 (−4.9)	43.8 (6.6)
Mean daily minimum °F (°C)	16.1 (−8.8)	17.7 (−7.9)	23.9 (−4.5)	29.3 (−1.5)	37.0 (2.8)	42.4 (5.8)	46.5 (8.1)	45.2 (7.3)	37.9 (3.3)	29.4 (−1.4)	23.3 (−4.8)	16.0 (−8.9)	30.4 (−0.9)
Mean minimum °F (°C)	−5.1 (−20.6)	.6 (−17.4)	11.7 (−11.3)	20.6 (−6.3)	26.3 (−3.2)	33.6 (0.9)	38.3 (3.5)	36.7 (2.6)	27.4 (−2.6)	16.6 (−8.6)	5.8 (−14.6)	−1.8 (−18.8)	−11.1 (−23.9)
Record low °F (°C)	−33 (−36)	−34 (−37)	−19 (−28)	3 (−16)	11 (−12)	25 (−4)	29 (−2)	27 (−3)	14 (−10)	−5 (−21)	−20 (−29)	−38 (−39)	−38 (−39)
Average precipitation inches (mm)	1.62 (41)	1.34 (34)	1.54 (39)	1.38 (35)	2.06 (52)	2.17 (55)	1.16 (29)	0.64 (16)	0.87 (22)	1.25 (32)	1.86 (47)	2.19 (56)	18.08 (458)
Average snowfall inches (cm)	13.1 (33)	6.6 (17)	3.3 (8.4)	0.5 (1.3)	0.0 (0.0)	0.0 (0.0)	0.0 (0.0)	0.0 (0.0)	0.0 (0.0)	0.4 (1.0)	7.7 (20)	20.9 (53)	52.5 (133.7)
Average precipitation days	11.0	8.3	9.3	9.1	10.5	10.3	5.6	4.3	5.3	8.3	11.4	12.4	105.8
Average snowy days	8.5	4.0	2.4	0.4	0.0	0.0	0.0	0.0	0.0	0.2	4.4	9.8	29.7
Source: NOAA

The hot dry summers and valley airflow can result in wildfire smoke and haze shrouding the town and greater Sanpoil valley when large fires are burning in the region. A number of wildfires in the past 50 years have burned close to Republic in both the Okanogan Highlands and the Kettle River Range, including the 1988 White Mountain Fire, 2001 Mount Leona Fire, and the 2015 North Star fire.

== Demographics ==
Historical population
Census	Pop.	Note	%±
1900	2,050		—
1910	999		−51.3%
1920	781		−21.8%
1930	710		−9.1%
1940	922		29.9%
1950	895		−2.9%
1960	1,064		18.9%
1970	862		−19.0%
1980	1,018		18.1%
1990	940		−7.7%
2000	954		1.5%
2010	1,073		12.5%
2020	992		−7.5%
U.S. Decennial Census; 2020 Census

=== 2020 census ===
As of the 2020 census, Republic had a population of 992 and 451 households, representing decreases from the 1,073 people and 493 households counted in 2010.

The median age was 46.4 years. 18.0% of residents were under the age of 18 and 28.2% of residents were 65 years of age or older. For every 100 females there were 90.4 males, and for every 100 females age 18 and over there were 88.2 males age 18 and over.

There were 451 households in Republic, of which 23.7% had children under the age of 18 living in them. Of all households, 30.8% were married-couple households, 23.5% were households with a male householder and no spouse or partner present, and 36.4% were households with a female householder and no spouse or partner present. About 42.8% of all households were made up of individuals and 23.9% had someone living alone who was 65 years of age or older.

There were 531 housing units in 2020, down from 536 in 2010. Of those units, 15.1% were vacant. The homeowner vacancy rate was 2.0% and the rental vacancy rate was 4.1%. According to the 2020 Decennial Census Demographic and Housing Characteristics data, 0.0% of residents lived in urban areas while 100.0% lived in rural areas.

Racial composition as of the 2020 census
Race	Number	Percent
White	796	80.2%
Black or African American	3	0.3%
American Indian and Alaska Native	28	2.8%
Asian	11	1.1%
Native Hawaiian and Other Pacific Islander	1	0.1%
Some other race	37	3.7%
Two or more races	116	11.7%
Hispanic or Latino (of any race)	56	5.6%

=== 2010 census ===
As of the 2010 census, there were 1,073 people, 493 households, and 263 families living in the city, a 12.5% increase over the 2000 census. The population density was 674.8 inhabitants per square mile (260.5/km^{2}). There were 536 housing units at an average density of 337.1 per square mile (130.2/km^{2}). The racial makeup of the city was 89.6% White, 0.1% African American, 2.7% Native American, 1.9% Asian, 0.1% Pacific Islander, 1.4% from other races, and 4.3% from two or more races. Hispanic or Latino of any race were 2.7% of the population.

There were 493 households, of which 23.7% had children under the age of 18 living with them, 33.7% were married couples living together, 13.6% had a female householder with no husband present, 6.1% had a male householder with no wife present, and 46.7% were non-families. 37.7% of all households were made up of individuals, and 14.6% had someone living alone who was 65 years of age or older. The average household size was 2.05 and the average family size was 2.68.

The median age in the city was 45.3 years. 19.7% of residents were under the age of 18; 7.6% were between the ages of 18 and 24; 22.1% were from 25 to 44; 29.9% were from 45 to 64; and 20.7% were 65 years of age or older. The gender makeup of the city was 46.1% male and 53.9% female.

=== 2000 census ===
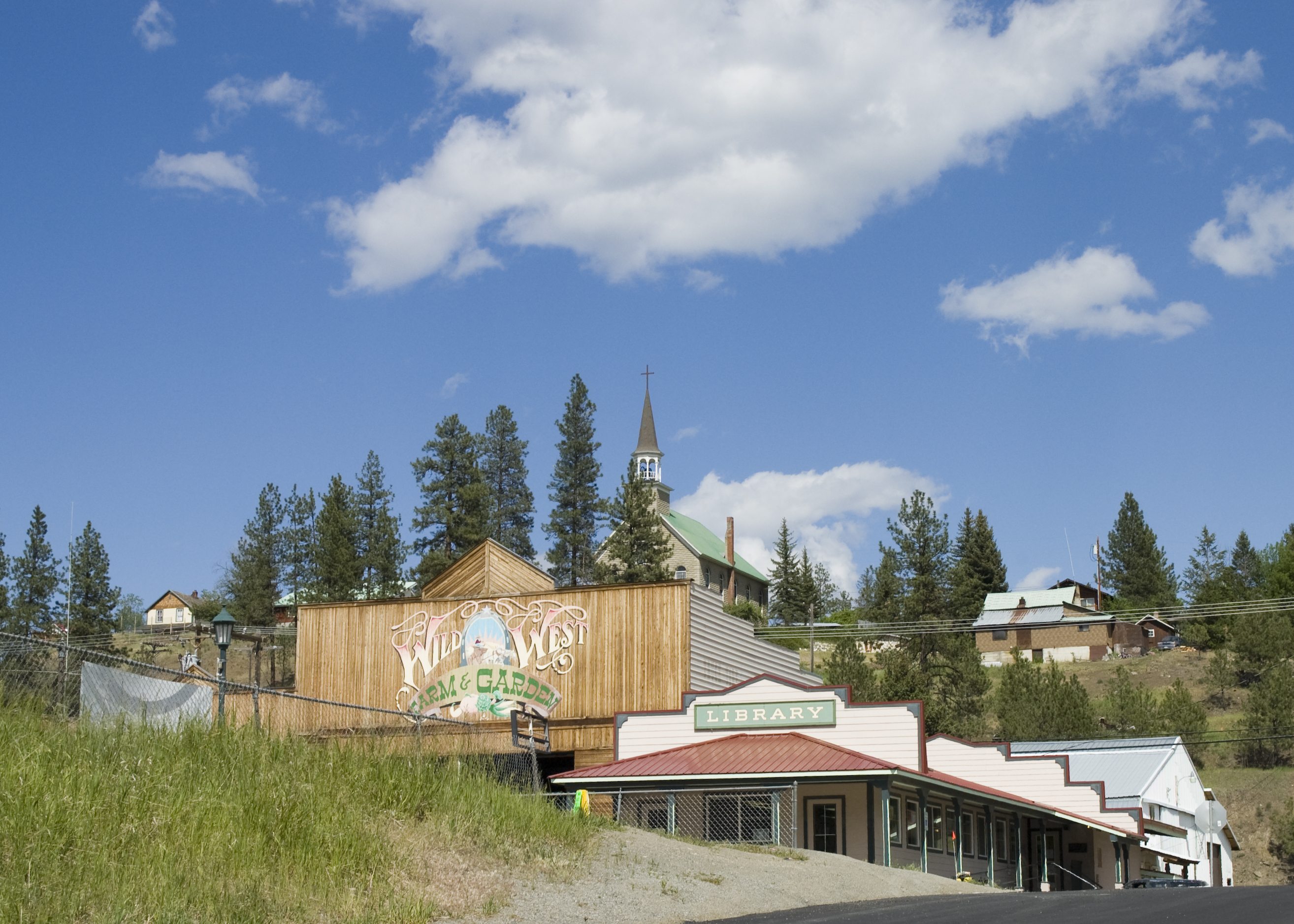
Library, Wild West Farm and Garden, and Catholic church in Republic

As of the 2000 census, there were 954 people, 411 households, and 244 families living in the city. The population density was 602.9 people per square mile (233.1/km^{2}). There were 500 housing units at an average density of 316.0 per square mile (122.2/km^{2}). The racial makeup of the city was 92.56% White, 0.84% African American, 2.73% Native American, 0.21% Asian, 0.10% Pacific Islander, 0.73% from other races, and 2.83% from two or more races. Hispanic or Latino of any race were 1.99% of the population.

There were 411 households, out of which 31.4% had children under the age of 18 living with them, 44.0% were married couples living together, 11.7% had a female householder with no husband present, and 40.4% were non-families. 36.5% of all households were made up of individuals, and 15.6% had someone living alone who was 65 years of age or older. The average household size was 2.25 and the average family size was 2.96.

In the city, the population age distribution is spread out, with 26.0% under the age of 18, 7.3% from 18 to 24, 24.4% from 25 to 44, 27.9% from 45 to 64, and 14.4% who were 65 years of age or older. The median age was 40 years. For every 100 females, there were 93.9 males. For every 100 females age 18 and over, there were 88.8 males.

The median income for a household in the city was $25,284, and the median income for a family was $30,357. Males had a median income of $28,750 versus $24,286 for females. The per capita income for the city was $14,427. About 20.2% of families and 24.0% of the population were below the poverty line, including 31.5% of those under age 18 and 17.6% of those age 65 or over.

== Economy ==
Republic has a number of businesses that line Clark Avenue, the main street of town, including Anderson's Grocery, first established in 1900, the Republic Drug Store, established two years later in 1902, and the Stonerose Interpretive Center. The Ferry County Memorial Hospital is the largest employer in the county. The town is the county seat of Ferry County, and a number of city county and state jobs are located in Republic as a result. Curlew Lake, 7 miles (11 km) long, lies northeast of Republic and has summertime fishing and boating. Swan Lake is small mountain lake 14 miles (23 km) to the south of Republic and also serves to be a popular lake for local residents and tourists to visit. Republic is surrounded by the Colville National Forest and 13 miles to the south is the Colville Indian Reservation boundary.

The oldest operating business in Republic is Anderson's Grocery, founded in the summer of 1900. The Republic Drug Store founded in 1904, was reported to be the oldest continually family run drugstore in the state of Washington as of 2003.

== Arts and culture ==
Republica weatbrooki wing fossil, Stonerose collections

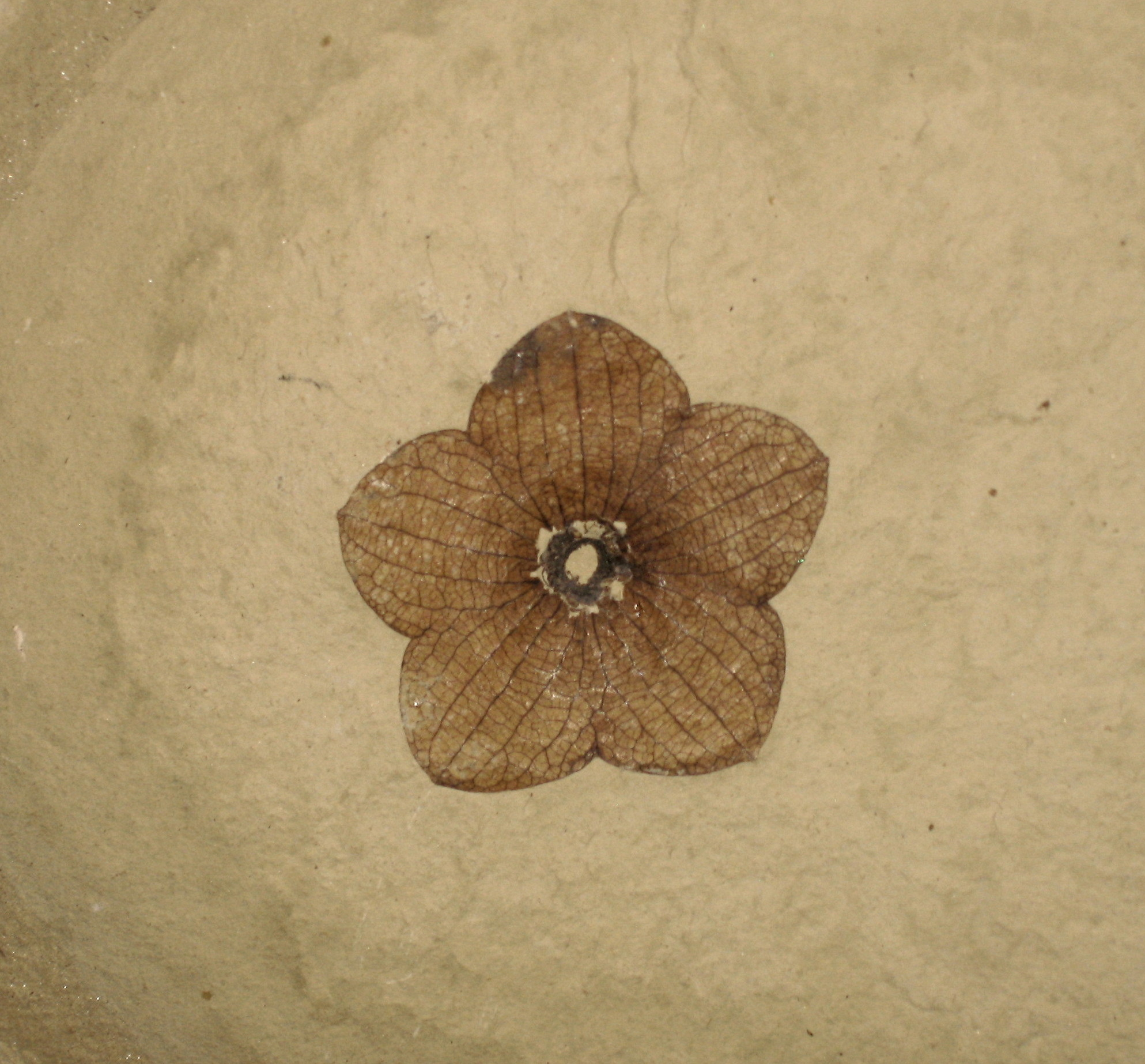
Florissantia quilchenensis flower fossil, inspiration for the Republic Skatepark

The areas history of mining and logging is celebrated during the annual Prospector's Days weekend, held during the second weekend in June. Events are staged across Republic, and people attending can try their hand at competing in mining and logging competitions, panning for gold, and watching an old west gun fight.

The Stonerose Interpretive Center and Fossil Site, famous for the Eocene fossils found in a 49 mya Klondike Mountain Formation lake bed at the north end of Republic is housed on the corner of North Clarke Avenue and Highway 20. A number of extinct plants and animals found in the lake bed have been named in honor of Republic, including Acer republicense, a maple, Rhus republicensis, a sumac, and Republica hickeyi an extinct flowering plant. Insects named for Republic include Republica weatbrooki, a damselfly, Republicopteron douseae, a katydid-relative, and Ulteramus republicensis a sawfly.

At the Ferry County Fairgrounds, located 3 mi (4.8 km) east of town on State Route 20, is the Ferry County Carousel originally built between 1895 and 1900.

== Government and politics ==
Republic is the county seat of Ferry County and the only incorporated municipality in the county.

In October 2020, the Republic City Council voted to switch from a city police department to contract with the Ferry County Sheriff who had been responding to emergency calls since early 2020. The vote eliminated the city police department and its only police officer, then gubernatorial candidate Loren Culp, from the city payroll. Ferry county Sheriff Ray Maycumber had offered a position with the sheriff's department to Culp, but the offer was not accepted. The city retained all the physical police property and equipment, should there be a decision to reactivate the city police.

== Education ==
The Republic School District operates four public schools in the town that enrolled 278 students during the 2022–23 school year. It employs 23 teachers and 27 administration and other staff members. The district primarily serves Republic south to the Colville Reservation boundary, as well as north to the northern end of Curlew Lake, with boundaries extending east towards Sherman pass and west towards Wauconda along Highway 20.

== Parks and recreation ==
A skate park built in conjunction with Grindline Skateparks of Seattle, Washington was completed in 2024. The park was built on a .73 acres (3,000 m^{2}) lot at the south end of Republic, across from the Republic schools and next to the western terminus of the Golden Tiger Trail. The park was designed and shaped with the main bowl stylized after a Florissantia blossom. Letters supporting the initiative were received by the Washington State Recreation and Conservation office from Jay Inslee, then Washington State Governor; Jeff Ament, Pearl Jam bassist; and a number of local residents and organizations.
