= Tripod Complex Fire =

2006 wildfire in Washington, United States

- Date: July 24 – October 2, 2006
- Location: Okanogan County, Washington, United States
- Coordinates: 48°30′10″N 120°2′26″W

Statistics
- Burned area: 175,184 acres (709 km^{2})

Impacts
- Injuries: 7

Ignition
- Cause: Lightning

Map
- Location of Tripod Complex Fire in Washington

The Tripod Complex Fire was a wildfire which burned in north-central Washington state in 2006. The complex consisted of two wildfire complexes which later merged into a single fire: the Spur Peak Fire and the Tripod Fire. Both were caused by lightning strikes. The Tripod Complex burned a total area of 175,184 acres (709 km^{2}), making it one of the largest wildfires in Washington history at the time.

== Events ==
Prolonged hot and dry weather, combined with an outbreak of mountain pine beetles and a large number of thunderstorms made the 2006 wildfire season the most severe in Washington state history. The 2006 Pacific Northwest wildfire season began in late June, when an extended thunderstorm followed a three-day heat wave. Between June 27 and July 10, lightning strikes occurred almost daily.

Lightning ignited several wildfires during this period—including the Spur Peak Fire, which was first reported on July 3. Located in the Okanogan National Forest, the fire was deemed fully contained by July 14.

A second thunderstorm in late July set off another round of wildfire activity in the region. On July 24, a new fire burning just south of the Spur Peak Fire was reported: the Tripod Fire. Smokejumpers from the North Cascades Smokejumpers base in nearby Winthrop, Washington—11 miles (18 km) from the point of ignition—were quickly dispatched to the fire. Despite early containment efforts, low humidity and gusty winds allowed the Tripod Fire to grow rapidly. The extreme fire weather also re-intensified the previously contained Spur Peak Fire, which crossed control lines on July 27. The two fires converged in late August.

In mid-August, a battalion of 550 United States Army soldiers was deployed to fight the Tripod Complex Fire. It was the first time a military battalion had been used to fight a wildfire in the US since 2003. By August 23, the Tripod Complex had grown to 200 square miles (518 km^{2}) and around 3,000 firefighters were assigned to the fires. Washington governor Christine Gregoire surveyed the complex by helicopter and later declared a statewide wildfire emergency, stating "Numerous wildfires across Washington pose a serious threat to homes, infrastructure, businesses and natural resources".

The Tripod Complex was extinguished in October, when snowfall ended the wildfire season. The complex had burned a total of 175,184 acres (709 km^{2}).
