= Sherman Pass (Washington) =

Mountain pass in Washington

- Interactive map of Sherman Pass
- Elevation: 5,575 ft (1,699 m)
- Traversed by: State Route 20

Third Approach
- Location: Ferry County, Washington, United States
- Range: Kettle River Range, Monashee Mountains
- Coordinates: 48°36.4′N 118°28.8′W

Sherman Pass (el. 5575 ft./1699 m.) is a high mountain pass that crosses the Kettle River Range in the state of Washington. It is the highest pass in the state maintained all year. The pass is located on the Sherman Pass Scenic Byway which traverses the Colville National Forest. The pass is surrounded by the aftermath of the 1988 White Mountain Fire. The pass was named after American Civil War General William Tecumseh Sherman who traveled across the pass in 1883.
