= Kettle River Range =

Mountain range in Canada and the United States

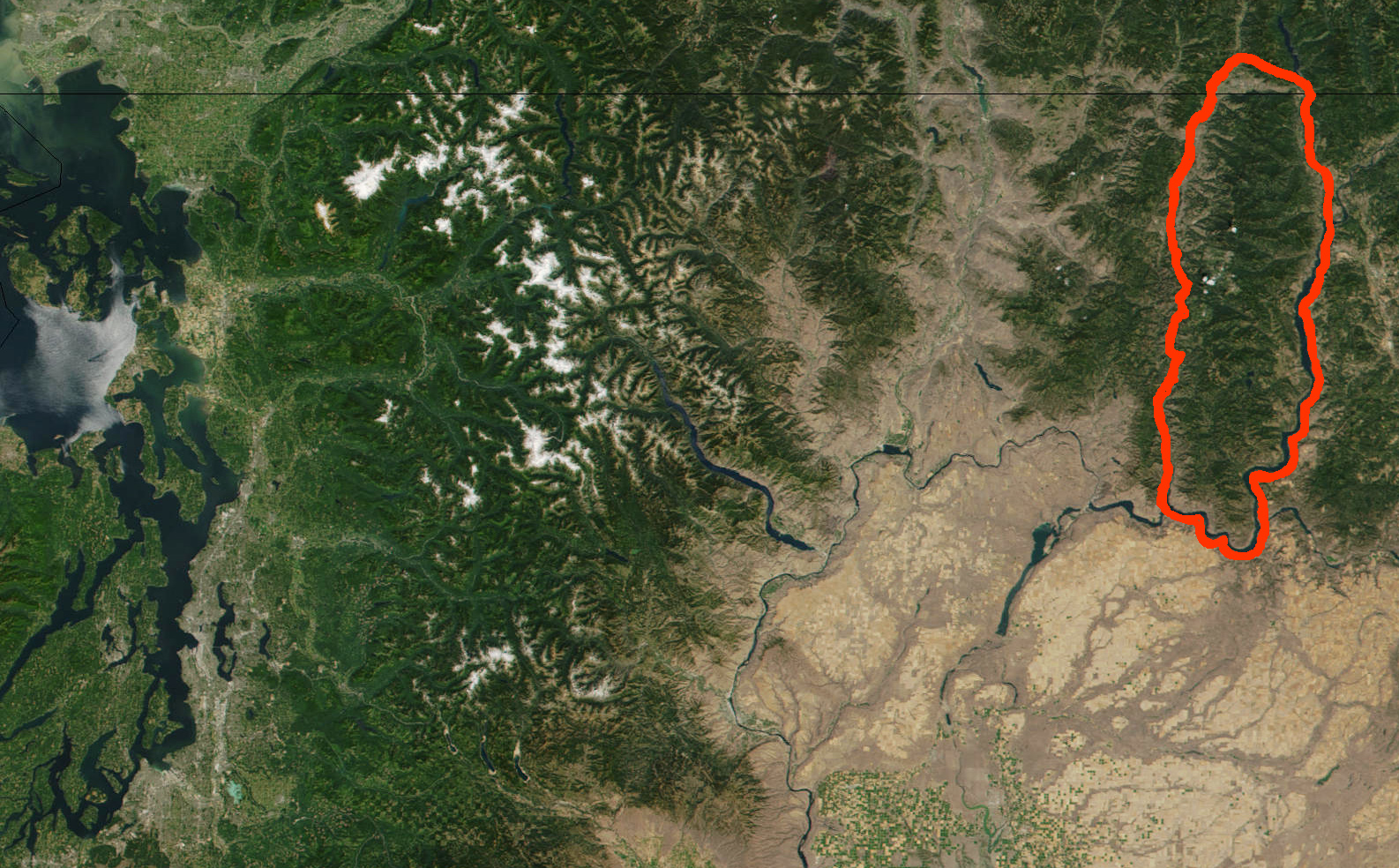
- NASA satellite image of north central Washington state and southern British Columbia with the Kettle River Range outlined in red (photo: MODIS Jacques Descloitres, 2001)

Highest point
- Peak: Copper Butte (U.S.)
- Elevation: 2,177 m (7,142 ft)
- Coordinates: 48°42′09″N 118°27′55″W

Dimensions
- Area: 2,700 mi^{2} (7,000 km^{2})

Geography
- The Kettle River Range defines the eastern and southern borders of Ferry County, Washington
- Country: Canada/United States
- Region(s): Boundary Country: Washington & British Columbia
- Range coordinates: 49°0′N 118°25′W
- Parent range: Monashee Mountains, parent range: Columbia Mountains

The Kettle River Range, often called the Kettle Range, is the southernmost range of the Monashee Mountains, located in southeastern British Columbia, Canada and Ferry County, Washington, in the United States. Most of the northern half of the range is protected by the Colville National Forest. The southern half of the range is located on the Colville Indian Reservation. The highest peak is Copper Butte, which reaches 2,177 metres (7,142 ft). The range is crossed by Washington State Route 20 at Sherman Pass.

== Geography ==
The Kettle River Range encompasses an area of 2,700 square miles (7,000 km^{2}) and is a subrange of the Monashee Mountains, which in turn form part of the Columbia Mountains. The range runs north to south, bordered on the east by the Kettle River and the Columbia River, and on the west by the Kettle River, the Curlew Valley and the San Poil River. The mountainous region begins immediately north of the Canada–US border, at Grand Forks, British Columbia, extending 110 miles (177 km) south to the bend of the Columbia River and Lake Roosevelt, formed by Grand Coulee Dam, where it terminates. The Okanogan Highlands are adjacent to the range on the west, and the Selkirk Mountains are adjacent on the east.

The Sherman Pass Scenic Byway runs 40 miles (64 km) east from the town of Republic, Washington across the center of the Kettle River Range and reaches its highest point at Sherman Pass, 5,575 feet (1,699 m), the highest mountain pass open all year in Washington state. The route is named for American Civil War General William Tecumseh Sherman, who crossed the range in 1883. Crossing the range to the north is county road 602, which travels over the 4,600 ft (1,400 m) Boulder-Deer Creek Pass between Curlew and U.S. Route 395 south of Orient, Washington. One pass is present in the southern reach of the mountains, Bridge Creek Pass between Highway 21 and Inchelium.

== History ==
Prospectors and low-paid Chinese miners working claims in the Kettle River Range produced more than 839,000 ounces of gold between 1896 and 1959. The largest amounts came from the Republic District although 6,000 ounces of gold came from the Danville and Columbia River Districts. Terrace deposits 30 and 100 feet above the Columbia River at Keller also produced gold. Records state that during this time period, 164 lode mines, where thick mineral veins were worked with pick axes and shovels, and 35 placer mines, where minerals exposed by erosion were recovered from rivers and loose surface soil, operated in Ferry County.—From 1904 to 1928, the Kettle River Range was the largest producer of gold in the state. Mining operations yielded silver, copper, lead, zinc, platinum, nickel, cobalt, tungsten, iron, and iron pyrite ("fool’s gold"), as well.

Today, the Kettle River Range is a popular, all-season recreation area for hiking, sport and aided climbing, snowshoeing, and cross-country skiing. The Kettle Crest National Recreation Trail follows the backbone of the range, and may be accessed at the Boulder-Deer Creek Summit South Sno-Park Trailhead at the north or the Kettle Crest trailhead on Sherman Pass in the south.

== Flora ==
One of the most restricted Canadian endemic species, Phemeranthus sediformis, the Okanogan fameflower, is native to the Columbia Mountains and Kettle River Range Between Kelowna and the northern Colville Reservation boarder in Washington State.

== Wildfires ==
The White Mountain fire burnt and destroyed 21,000 acres of timber in the southern half of the range in 1988, including all but the easternmost flanks of White Mountain, Edds Mountain, Bald Mountain, and Snow Peak, north to Sherman Peak. The State of Washington installed several interpretive sites and pull-outs along roads in the region that explain the causes and effects of the fire.

On August 13, 2001, a series of major wildfires and complexes were ignited by regional lightning storms passing over eastern Washington. Among them was the Mount Leona Fire which burned for several weeks and encompasses over 6,000 acres in the central Kettle River range northeast of Curlew Lake.

The Kettle Complex fires occurred in late summer of 2015. The complex included three fires – the Stickpin, Renner and Graves Mountain fires – burning south of the Canada–US border, west of Highway 395, north of State Route 20 and east of Highway 21. An estimated 73,392 acres were burned.

== Major summits ==
- Copper Butte, 7,142 feet (2,177 m), the highest summit in the Kettle River Range
- Snow Peak, 7,103 feet (2,165 m), 48°34′55″N 118°28′56″W
- Scar Mountain, 7,046 feet (2,148 m), 48°40′52″N 118°27′36″W
- Wapaloosie Mountain, 7,018 feet (2,139 m), 48°39′52″N 118°27′47″W
- Sherman Peak, 7,011 feet (2,137 m), 48°35′48″N 118°28′39″W
- Bald Mountain, 6,940 feet (2,115 m), 48°33′33″N 118°30′09″W
- White Mountain, 6,923 feet (2,110 m), 48°30′41″N 118°27′12″W
- Columbia Mountain, 6,782 feet (2,067 m), 48°37′13″N 118°28′55″W
- Midnight Mountain, 6,660 feet (2,030 m), 48°35′48″N 118°28′39″W
- King Mountain, 6,634 feet (2,022 m), 48°40′36″N 118°24′11″W
- Edds Mountain, 6,540 feet (1,993 m), 48°33′27″N 118°32′16″W

== See also ==
- List of mountain ranges in Washington
