= School Fire =

August 2005 wildfire in Washington, US

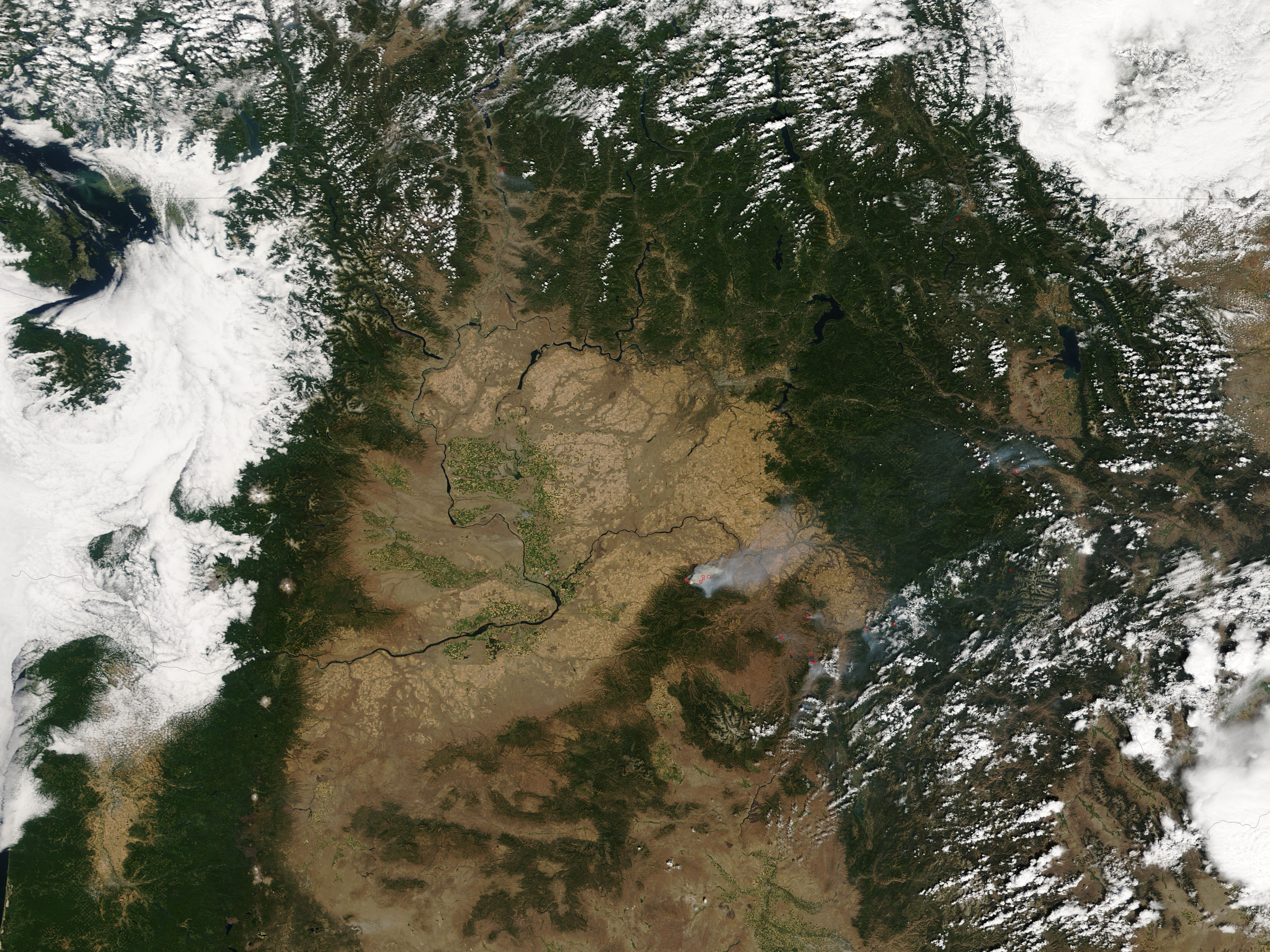
- Date: August 5, 2005–August 19, 2005; (PDT)
- Location: Washington, United States

Statistics
- Burned area: 51,892.13 acres (81.08 sq mi; 21,000 ha)
- Land use: Rural areas and national forest

Impacts
- Deaths: 0
- Structures lost: 100+

Ignition
- Cause: Dry conditions; dead tree striking a powerline

The School Fire was a wildfire that occurred in the US state of Washington in August 2005, so named due it to beginning in School Canyon. The fire originated in the Umatilla National Forest in southeastern Washington, in Columbia and Garfield Counties. The School Fire was detected from space by NASA's Terra satellite. The fire burned around 51,892.13 acres (81.08 sq mi; 21,000 ha), destroying over 100 houses and 100 outbuildings. The largest wildfire of 2005 in the contiguous United States, the School Fire's smoke was seen as far away as Walla Walla. Its total damage was estimated at $15 million.

== Origin and spread ==
The School Fire started on August 5, 2005 when a dead pine tree struck a power line, igniting dry grass. The fire "blew up" due to the combination of dry grass and high winds. On August 6, the fire spread from 170 to 30,000 acres. Its spread was rapid enough that 1600 firefighters were fighting it on its fourth day. One firefighter was hurt and required treatment at a hospital, but there were no fatalities. The fire was declared contained on August 19, although restrictions on roads in the fire area were maintained until October 8.

== Aftermath ==
The School Fire burned over 51,000 acres, 28,000 of which was in the Umatilla National Forest. The Burned Area Emergency Rehabilitation team of the US Forest Service cleared dangerous trees from the land of the National Forest. The fire damaged enough property and was large enough for Federal Emergency Management Agency (FEMA) to authorize use of federal funds to fight the fire. FEMA spent $3,986,571.64 in Public Assistance as a direct result of the fire. The fire was the largest in the contiguous 48 states during the summer 2005 fire season.

== See also ==
- Wildfires in Washington state
