= 1988 White Mountain Fire =

1988 wildfire in Washington, U.S.

White Mountain Fire
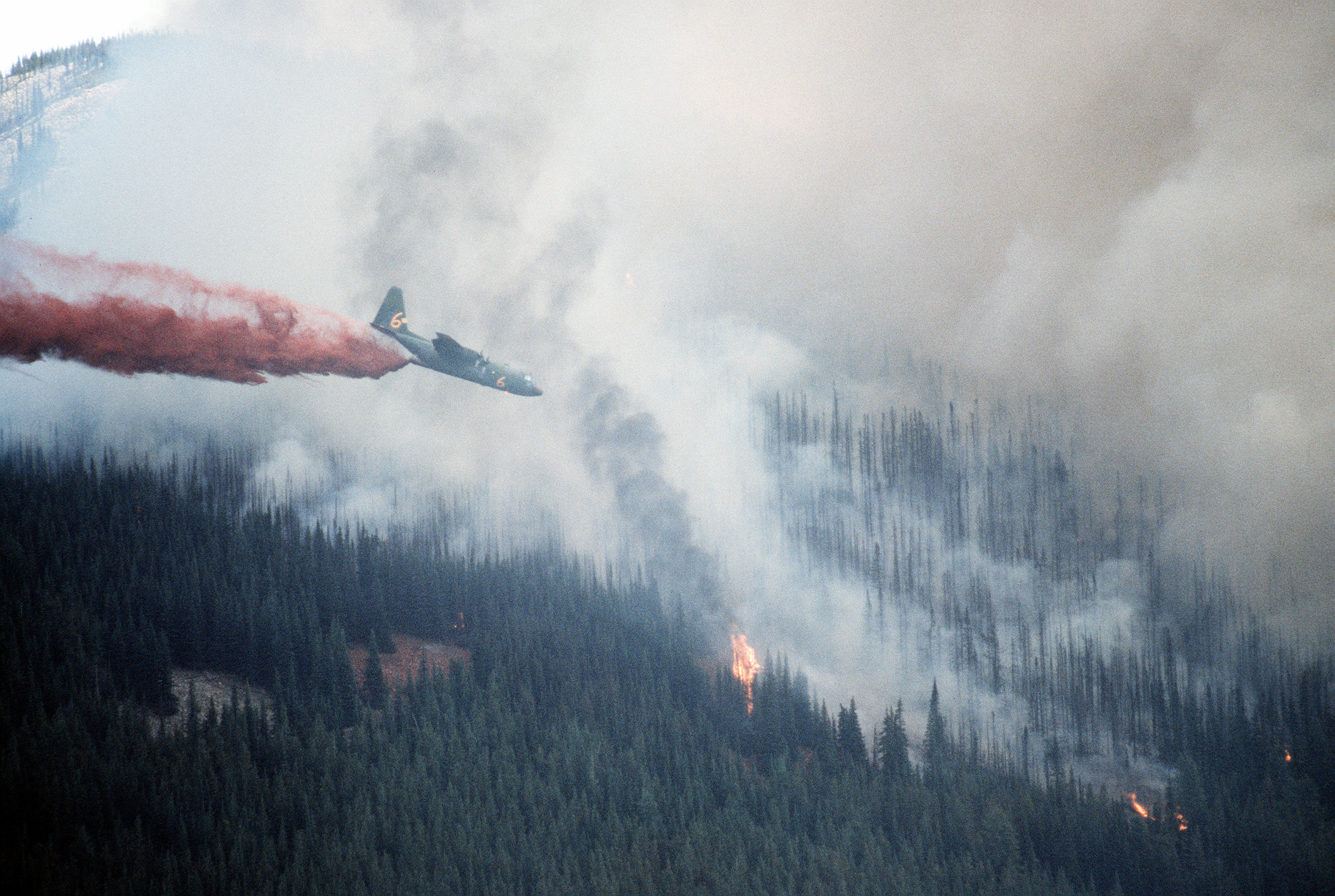
- A C-130 Hercules dropping retardant
- Date: July 1988 – September 17, 1988
- Location: Kettle River Range; Ferry County, Washington, U.S.
- Coordinates: 48°36.4′N 118°28.8′W

Statistics
- Burned area: 19,760–21,717 acres (79.97–87.89 km^{2})
- Land use: National Forest

Impacts
- Cost: US$6.5 million

Ignition
- Cause: Dry lightning strikes

Map
- Approximate location of the White Mountain Fire

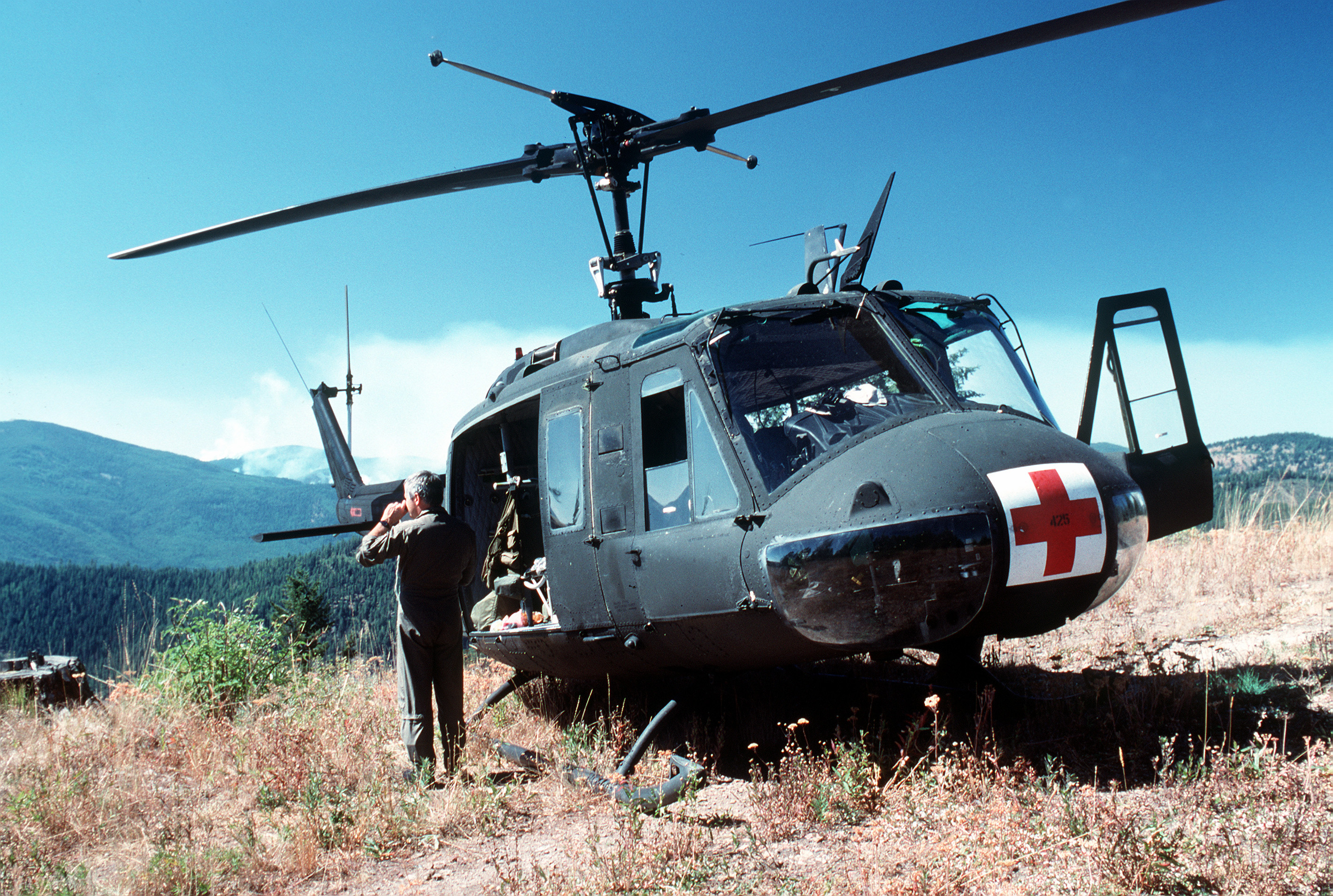
Army National Guard UH-1 Iroquois on standby

The White Mountain Fire was a wildfire in Ferry County, Washington, in the Kettle River Range, east of Republic, Washington. The fire was started by multiple lightning strikes in the upper reaches of Hall Creek drainage in August. Because of fire suppression manpower shortages, the fires escaped early containment and grew together to become the White Mountain Fire, which then started the northern Sherman fire. That was initially considered a separate fire, but rapidly was rolled into the White Mountain Complex. The fires reburned portions of the 1929 Dollar Mountain Fire including sections in 1929 called the "White Mountain Fire".

== Background ==
Much of northern Ferry County is dominated by temperate coniferous forests maintained by the Colville National Forest and as private land. The forests at the lower elevation are mixed Douglas fir and ponderosa pine, which intergrade into mixed Douglas fir, lodgepole pine, and western larch at mid-elevation and finally into mixed Engelmann spruce, subalpine fir, and lodgepole pine forests at the highest elevations.

The Kettle River Range had a history of large wildfires preceding the White Mountain Fire. In 1929 the Dollar Mountain Fire burned an estimated 98,000–142,000 acres (40,000–57,000 ha) along the eastern slopes of the Kettles including areas where the White Mountain Fire later occurred. In the wake of the Dollar Mountain fire the network of Colville National Forest resources including fire lookouts devoted to fire spotting and suppression was improved and expanded upon.

When possible, the lookouts were placed so two sites would have overlapping views to help in pinpointing fire locations. The height of lookout building and use ran between the 1930s and 1950s, with between 660 and 685 permanent lookouts by 1953. In the decades between the 1950s and 1980s fire lookout use waned, with the Forest Service and county transitioning more to aerial reconnaissance with airplanes combined with automated cameras installed at former lookout sites.

The 1988 fire season for Western North America started early and was intense, with news and resources focusing on the Yellowstone fires that had started in June.

== Fire ==
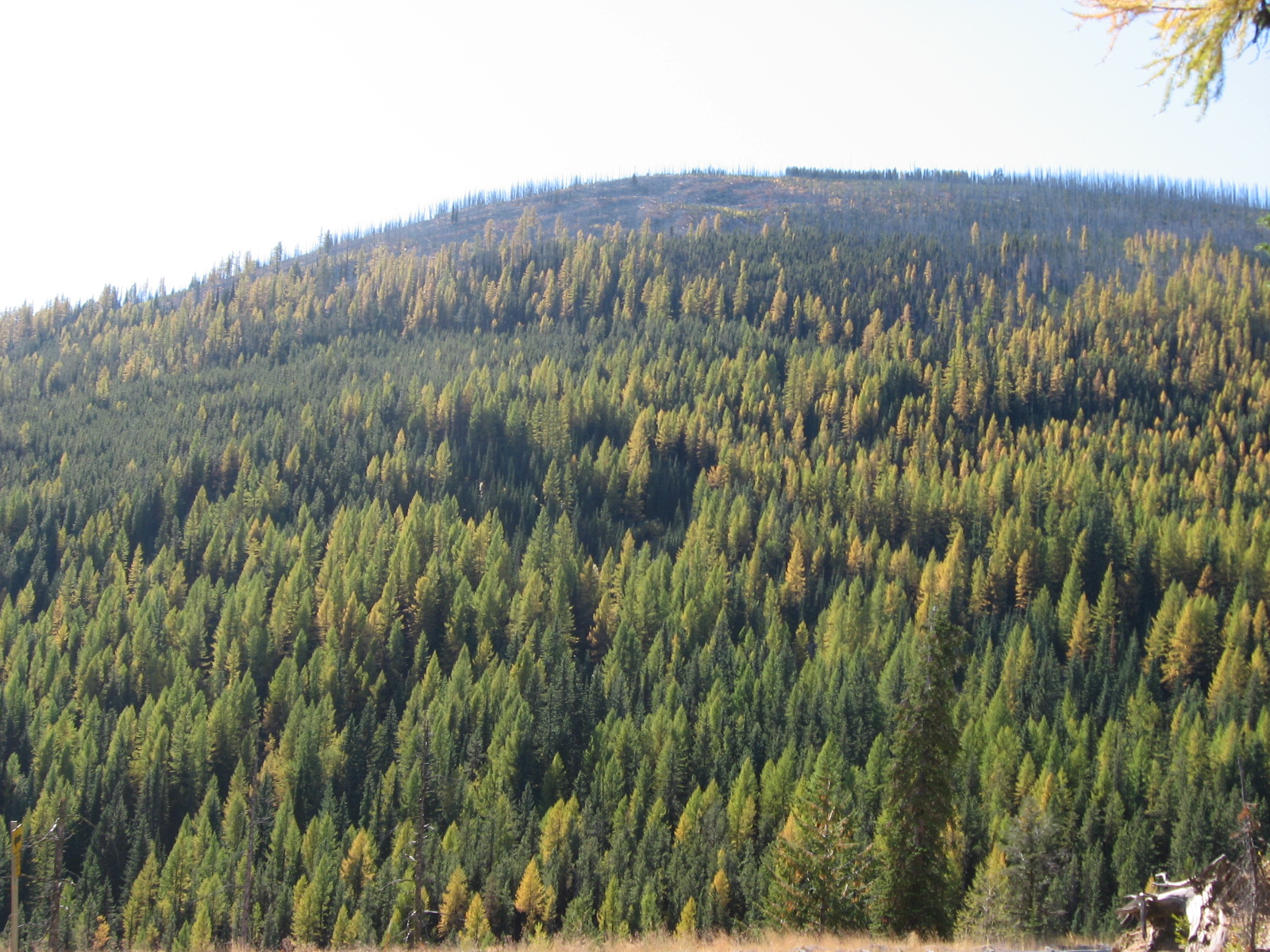
Northern flank of Sherman Peak showing Dollar Mountain and White Mountain burn scars

The fire was started by multiple lightning strikes associated with a dry thunderstorm drifting northeast across the Colville National Forest on August 23. The overnight passage ignited six different fires in the upper reaches of the Hall Creek drainage basin, southwest of Sherman Pass. Control of the fires was first attempted by smokejumpers based out of Winthrop, Washington, with forest service ground crews drawn from the Kettle Falls and Republic stations. Because of conditions during the day however, none of the fires was contained. Combat of the fires continued over the next week with little success and they merged within a few days. After the first day a call was put out for a Type 1 incident management team, the highest management level, along with ordering more crews and resources. Because of the Yellowstone fires, the available resources which were requested were slow to become available.

Work on August 30 was aided by low winds which had prevailed over the week resulting in slow fire growth. With the fire at 2,500 acres (1,000 ha) and considered fully contained on August 29, some crews were diverted to the smaller Barnaby Creek fire, considered 15% contained, Bald Mountain Fire, 30% contained and newly ignited Snow Peak fire. The total personnel allocated to the various fires of the complex was 742, with 350 on the fire and the others resting.

Hot dry winds on September 2 resulted in "blow outs" along two different fronts of the fire complex and grew the fire to 4,700 acres (1,900 ha), an increase of 1,000 acres (400 ha). Because of heavy smoke from the fires on White Mountain and Snow Peak, Washington State Route 21 was closed between Pine Grove, Washington, north to the Canadian border closures and 20 restrictions due to smoke. Because of similar conditions Washington State Route 20 between Washington State Route 395 on the east side of Sherman Pass and Highway 21 at Pinegrove in the west was restricted to local traffic only.

By the morning of September 4, the major fire had split, with the southern White Mountain Fire and a new Sherman Fire to the north. Initial treatment by fire management was to treat the two as separate fire groups with the total complex encompassing 7,500 acres (3,000 ha), over double in size from September 2 when it had almost been contained. Winds on the 3rd allowed fire to jump the fire lines on two sides and also cross over Highway 20. Because the fires grew in a westerly direction to within 10 mi (16 km) of Republic, a number of rural houses between Sherman Pass and Republic were evacuated. An evacuation plan was also created for the 1,000 people in Republic proper on the possibility the fires continued growing westward. At the same time the fire grew to within 0.5 mi (800 m) of the Bonneville Power Administration high voltage utility line which supplies the only power into northwestern Ferry County and parts of far eastern Okanogan County. About 600 people were assigned to the two fires and a request was put out for 400 more.

The fire growth over the next 24 hours took its size up to 12,500 acres (5,100 ha) and management officials deemed the complex too intergrown to treat as separate blazes. As such they renamed the whole group the White Mountain Complex, and the fires were intense enough to send both smoke and ash over Republic. Firecrews working on firelines had extended containment around approximately 45% of the complex and in doing so removed the imminent possibility of Republic being evacuated. The fire had not moved closer to the Bonneville Power Administration powerlines but the administration was staying prepared to cut power at any point if needed. With low winds during the day, the fire had a fleet of four helicopters perform water drops on the fire while 840 personnel were on the ground.

By September 15 the White Mountain, south 17 and two other fires in the area were all contained and crews were performing "clean up operations" on the burns aided by fall weather conditions. The White Mountain Complex as a whole had cost $6 million at that point to contain and stood at 21,162 acres (8,564 ha). The areas of the easiest containment were along old logging cuts and roadways, as they provided reduced fuel sources or breaks in the fuel. As of September 16 around 1,200 people were involved in the mop-up work which was winding down. With the final work finishing, the overall cost of the White Mountain Complex was around $6.9 million (equivalent to 18 million in 2024).

== Aftermath ==
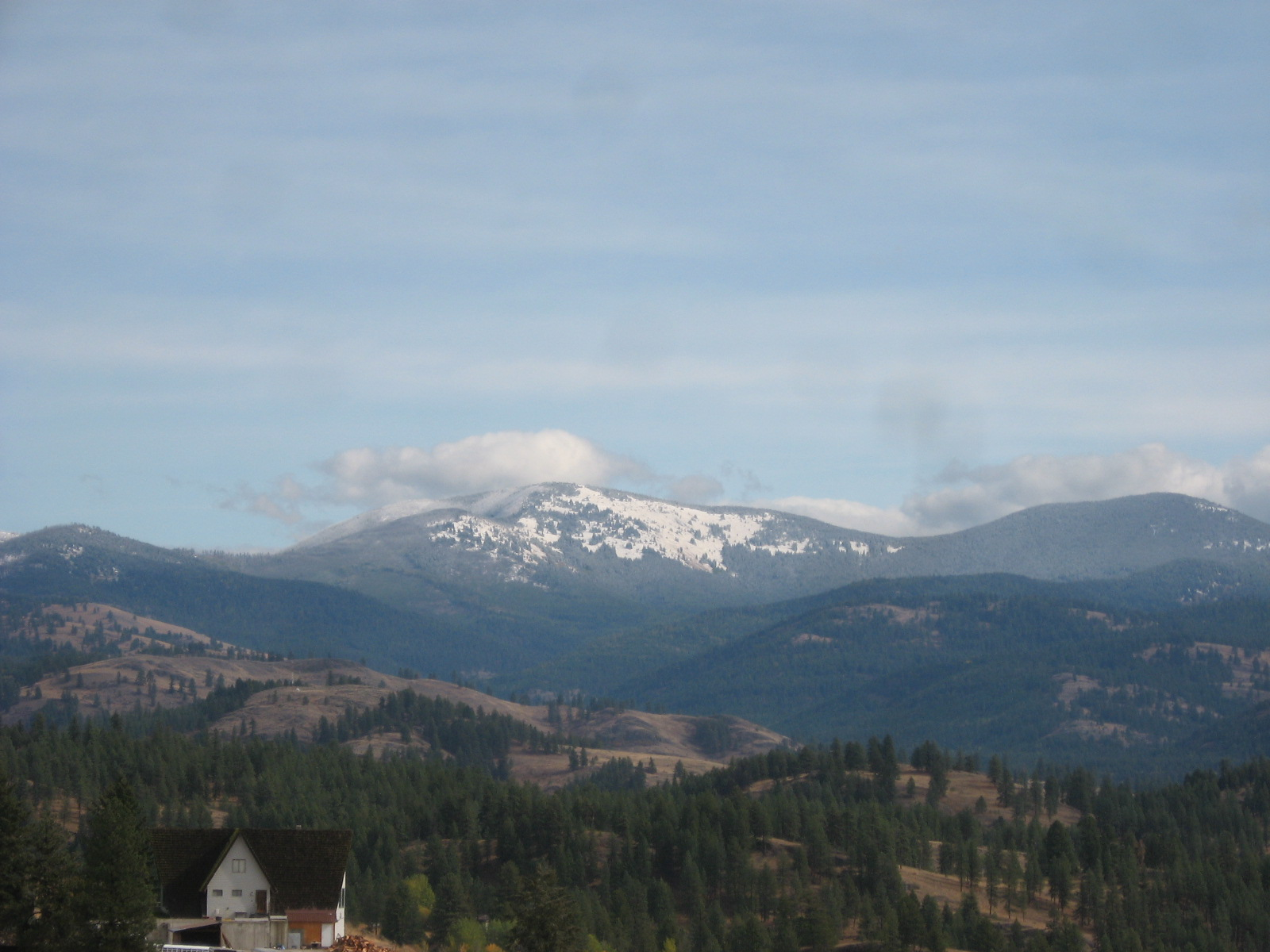
Early snowfall on Sherman Peak highlighting extensive fire scar

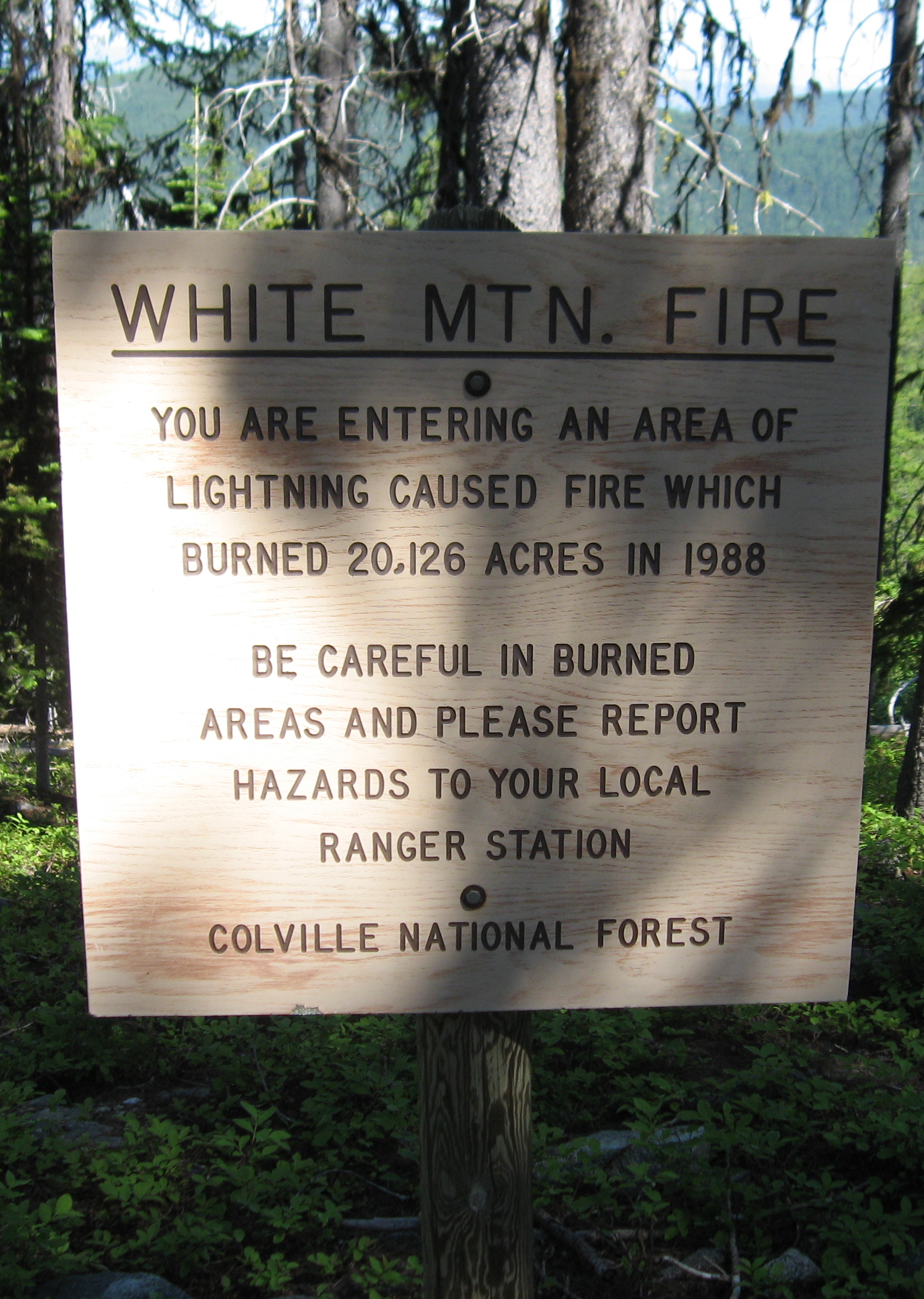
Cautionary signage on the Kettle Crest Trail

Having a noted connection to fire ecology, western larch showed a population rebound after the fire. Seedlings and saplings grow very quickly, but are highly intolerant of shade. The fires cleared large areas of canopy allowing for stands consisting of numerous saplings and scattered mature adults to emerge by 1995. The fire also destroyed full stands of mature subalpine fir, with the stand areas being taken over by Douglas fir, lodgepole pine, and western larch. Mature alpine fir that survived the fires have been dated as up to 300 years old.

The White Mountain Fire impacted a region of Washington State's second-largest lynx management zone, which encompasses a large portion of the Kettle River Range. Large fires such as the White Mountain Complex generate a mosaic forest habitat with mixed stands of old growth and new growth areas. Such mosaic areas are considered ideal habitat for lynx population recovery. However, post-fire timber harvesting and the planting of non-native grasses in the burned areas changes the forest ecology and habitat type. It is uncertain how acceptable the harvested and replanted areas are for young lynx looking to establish a territory.

Several trails explore the White Mountain Fire while two scenic overlooks are available looking across the eastern and western slopes of the mountains at fire influenced landscapes. The 6 mi (9.7 km) Sherman Peak loop trail is accessed by walking south from the Sherman Pass overlook across Hwy 20 and then uphill for about 1 mi (1.6 km) on the Kettle Crest Trail. The trail then forks, forming the Sherman Peak ring trail around the shoulders of Sherman Peak. The trail passes in and out of White Mountain Fire, Dollar Mountain Fire, and unburned alpine forest habitats. On the southwest corner of the peak the ring rejoins the Kettle Crest Trail which is the western side of the loop trail. Turning south, the trail joins the 28 mi (45 km) long hike to White Mountain via the Kettle Crest. This route also passes through many of the areas burned in 1988 as it winds along Sherman Peak, Snow Peak, Bald Mountain, and Barnaby Buttes.

Directly off of Highway 20 are two points of interest and associated overlooks. At the crest of the 5,575 ft (1.699 km) Sherman Pass, in the shoulder between Sherman Peak and Columbia Mountain is Sherman Pass overlook. A paved 0.25 mi (0.40 km) loop trail passes by the overlook which has interpretive signage about the vista east towards Paradise Peak, Graves Mountain, and the various fire-formed landscapes in the Upper Sherman Creek Valley. West of the pass is the White Mountain Interpretive Site which was built after the 1988 fire. The site includes interpretive signage about the effects of the fire on the western slopes of the Kettle River Range and has a fully paved 0.25 mi (0.40 km) trail.
