= Cold Springs Fire =

2008 wildfire in Washington, United States

The Cold Springs Fire started July 12, 2008, eleven miles north of Trout Lake in Washington. It was contained and put out in August 2008.

The fire was started by lightning on July 12 and spread rapidly through heavy dead timber, eventually burning a total of 7,993 acres before full containment was reached on August 1. Of the area burned, 4,723 acres were in the Gifford Pinchot National Forest, 1,623 on the Yakama Indian Reservation, 1,076 on land managed by the Washington Department of Natural Resources, and 307 on privately owned lands. At the peak of firefighting efforts, over 1,000 personnel were assigned to combat the blaze. In total, 1,037 firefighters from 33 units were needed to reach containment.

The fire neared Mount Adams as it spread north of Trout Lake causing closings for several trails and camp grounds. Fire officials said it was the largest fire the area had received in decades. The dangerous fire conditions allowed it to grow and spread quickly through dead trees and winds up to 25 mph. However, people were expecting a large fire and had been preparing so that no homes or people were threatened in the event. Although no structures were burned, a 1909 historic guard station had to be wrapped in fire-retardant material.
