= Tatoosh fire =

2006 fire in Washington and British Columbia

- Date: August 22, 2006–September 2006
- Location: Washington, British Columbia
- Coordinates: 48.9142°N 120.5922°W

Statistics
- Burned area: 19,339 hectares (47,788 acres)

Ignition
- Cause: Lightning

The Tatoosh fire began in Washington on August 22, 2006. It was sparked by lightning and in September 2006, it moved across the border into British Columbia. As of September 10, 2006, it was still out of control and burning in E. C. Manning Provincial Park. At that time, it had already burned 4,000 hectares before rain finally brought the fire season to an end. The fire ultimately burned 47,787 acres (19,339 ha) in Washington and British Columbia, and the overall Tatoosh Complex burned 51,671 acres (20,911 ha).
