= Curlew Lake (Washington) =

- Karamip Lake
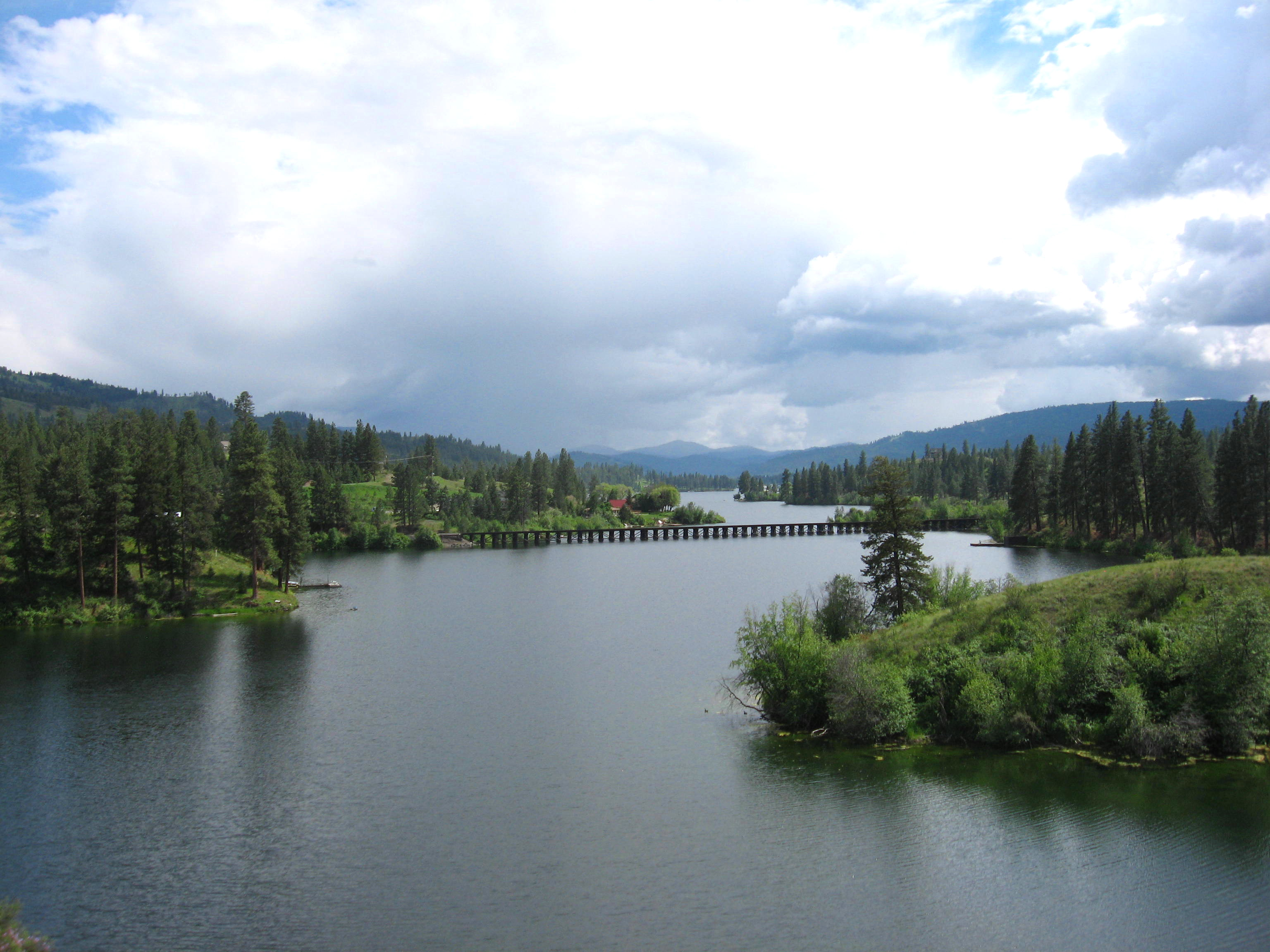
- Looking south down the lake

- Location within Washington (state) Location within the United States
- location of Curlew Lake
- Location: Northeast of Republic, Ferry County, Washington
- Coordinates: 48°43′50″N 118°39′50″W
- Type: Oligo-mesotrophic glacial kettle lake
- Primary inflows: Sanpoil River, Herron Creek, Barrett Creek, Trout Creek
- Primary outflows: Curlew Creek
- Catchment area: 64.50 sq mi (167.1 km^{2})
- Basin countries: United States
- Max. length: 7 mi (11 km)
- Max. width: Varies no more than 0.33 mi (0.53 km)
- Surface area: 921 acres (373 ha)
- Average depth: 43 ft (13 m)
- Max. depth: 130 ft (40 m)
- Water volume: 39,603 acre⋅ft (48,850,000 m^{3})
- Shore length^{1}: 15.8 mi (25.4 km)
- Surface elevation: 2,333 ft (711 m)
- Islands: 4
- Settlements: Republic
- ^{1} Shore length is not a well-defined measure.

Curlew Lake is a 921-acre (3.73 km^{2}) lake located in the glacier-carved Curlew Valley, south of Curlew and northeast of Republic, Washington. The spring- and stream-fed lake is named for the long-billed curlew, Numenius americanus, that once frequented the area. The 7-mile-long (11 km) lake reaches a maximum of 1/3 miles wide and includes four small islands.

The average depth of the lake is 43 ft (13 m) deep with a maximum depth of 130 ft (40 m) reached in the northern area. Curlew Lake provides visitors and residents with opportunities for kayaking, boating, fishing, swimming, water skiing, canoeing, and sailing. Public access is available at Curlew Lake State Park at the lake's south end.

The first elevation determinations for Ferry County establishing the water level of Curlew Lake were made from 1901 to 1903 by E. M. Fry and F.E. Fellows. The official elevation of the surface of Curlew Lake was recorded on May 13, 1901, as 2,345 ft (715 m).

In 1917 the Washington State legislature granted the Curlew Irrigation District the right to overflow the shore lands bordering the lake up to and including the high-water mark.

Two years later a recommendation was made by the state game warden in 1919 that Curlew Lake be made into a reservoir for storing irrigation water. In 1926, with the construction of a 3 ft (0.91 m) dam at the north end of the lake, the water level was stabilized at an elevation 2,333 ft (711 m), 12 ft (3.7 m) lower than the original 1901 determination.

The lake hosts a number of native and introduced fish including Salvelinus fontinalis (brook trout), Salmo trutta (brown trout), Micropterus salmoides (largemouth bass), Oncorhynchus mykiss (rainbow trout), Esox masquinongy X Esox lucius (tiger muskellunge), and Ptychocheilus oregonensis (squawfish). The tiger muskellunge, raised at the Columbia Basin Fish Hatchery in Moses Lake, were initially released into the lake in 1997 to control populations of squawfish.

Several of the native mollusks found in the lake are now listed as species of concern. Anodonta californiensis commonly called the California floater is a species of mussel which was formerly found throughout Washington and in disjunct populations across the Western United States. The current Washington range is limited to Curlew Lake and three other locations. The severe reduction in range has resulted in the species' listing as a federal and state species of concern. The masked duskysnail (Lyogyrus) and Washington duskysnail (Amnicola), both undescribed species, are found in only two glacial kettle lakes in Washington, Fish Lake in Okanogan County and Curlew Lake.

Believed to have formerly ranged in glacial lakes from the Cascades to the Rockies, the Washington duskysnail is now only found in one location outside of Washington, and both snails are limited to the two lakes in Washington. This isolated range has placed them on state and federal watchlists as critically imperiled species.

Curlew Lake is one of several lakes in Eastern Washington to host a population of Euhrychiopsis lecontei (milfoil weevil) subsisting on the native milfoil species Myriophyllum sibiricum (northern milfoil).
