= Mount Bonaparte =

Mountain in Washington (state), United States

- Bonaparte Peak
- Mount Bonaparte from Highway 20, Sept 2026

Highest point
- Elevation: 7,257 ft (2,212 m)
- Prominence: 3,539 ft (1,079 m)
- Isolation: 26.71 mi (42.99 km)
- Coordinates: 48°47′7″N 119°7′20″W

Naming
- Etymology: for Napoleon Bonaparte
- Nickname: Old Boney

Geography
- Location within Washington (state)
- Country: United States
- State: Washington
- County: Okanogan
- Parent range: Okanogan Highlands
- Topo map(s): USGS 7.5 Mount Bonaparte, Havilla, Mount Anne, Cayuse Mountain
- Biome: Alpine, subalpine

Geology
- Rock age: 59-49mya
- Rock type: granodiorite/quartz monzonite pluton

Mount Bonaparte is a 7,257-foot (2,212 m) mountain located in the Okanogan Highlands of Northeastern central Washington, United States. The mountain is both the highest mountain in the Washington portion of the Okanagan Highlands and the third-highest Washington peak east of the Okanogan River. It is located in Okanogan County between the unincorporated communities of Havillah and Wauconda; the closest city is Tonasket.

The summit of Mount Bonaparte has been a fire lookout location since as early as 1904 when a solitary peak walker would camp at the summit under a tent. The first permanent Mount Bonaparte Lookout, a ground cabin with 15 ft (4.6 m) tower structure built above the roof was constructed in 1914. The tower was used through 1929 when a new lookout was funded. Additionally during the 1929 season, a cistern was carved into the summit granite which could hold enough snow and rain water to support the lookout needs over the summer months. Built in 1930, the taller lookout structure had a 14 ft × 14 ft (4.3 m × 4.3 m) lookout cabin and residence on top of a 16 ft (4.9 m) wooden tower. This tower served the fire watch needs until the very early 1960s, at which time it was deconstructed. The final 20 ft (6.1 m) tower was topped with a 15 ft × 15 ft (4.6 m × 4.6 m) cabin which served though 2024 and was built from helicoptered in supplies. In 2025 manning of the tower was turned over to volunteers.

This mountain can be accessed by three trails with Bonaparte Trail #306, a 5.5 mile ATV trail on the north side of the mountain leading up to the summit. Crossing over the southern slope is the Pacific Northwest Trail, which overlaps several other trails along the route and passes close to several historical cabins present on the mountain. Views from the summit reach as far as Canada, the North Cascades, the Colville Reservation, and Mount Rainier. In the winter several different Sno-Parks are maintained for snowmobile, cross-country skiing, and snowshoeing use.

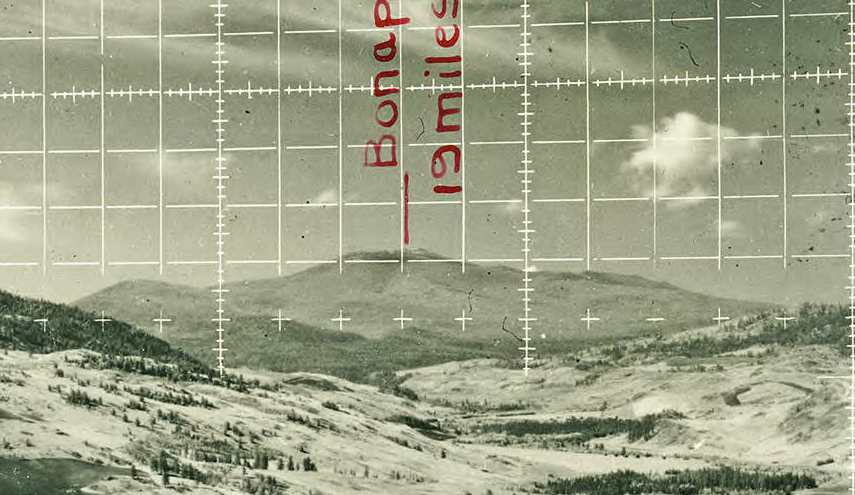
Mount Bonaparte viewed from the Lindsay lookout in British Columbia, c. 1930s

== Geography and geology ==
=== Geography ===
At 7,257 feet (2,212 m), Mount Bonaparte is the highest mountain in the Washington section of the Okanagan Highlands and one of the highest peaks east of the Okanogan River. It rises between the unincorporated communities of Havillah and Wauconda, while the closest cities are Tonasket to the southwest and Republic to the southeast. Early reports of the elevation were often given as 7,280 ft (2,220 m), with modern surveys adjusting the elevation downwards by over 20 ft (6.1 m). The highlands in Washington are a conglomeration of mountains spanning 90 mi (140 km) at the widest and 75 mi (121 km) south from the Canadian border. Mount Bonaparte is slightly shorter than Baldy Mountain, 7,575 ft (2,309 m), in southern British Columbia. Mount Bonaparte has a high prominence of 3,527 ft (1,075 m), the 31st highest in Washington, and 320th in the contiguous United States. It also has a high isolation of 26.71 mi (42.99 km) between it and its closest high neighbor, Baldy Mountain, resulting in it occasionally being considered a monadnock. By 1900 a location United States Geological Survey marker had been placed at Mount Bonapartes foot. According to the account by R. U. Goode, the marker was embedded in a rock face of the mountain foot near the end of the trail following Bonaparte Creek up from the Republic-Tonasket Road.

=== Geology ===
The origin of the Okanogan highlands and Mount Bonaparte is tied to the complex history of island arc and exotic terrain emplacement along the North American plate's western edge during subduction of the Farallon plate. The Farallon plate is suggested to have undergone a period of flat slab subduction wherein instead of curving downwards into the mantle close to the subduction point, the plate stayed close under the overriding North America Plate pushing up the Quesnellia terraine which had first accreted in the Jurassic. This resulted in the raising of a plateau region over the area possibly as much as 2 km (1.2 mi) higher than present average elevation. In the late Cretaceous to early Paleocene, starting around 61 million years ago the Farrallon plate started a 12 million year long slab rollback event in which it pulled down and away from Quesnellia melting the basement areas of the Quesnellian terrain. The melting occurred from roughly 61 to 49 million years ago after which the magma pools were rapidly exposed by crustal extension and erosion from 49 to 47 million years ago. The Challis volcanic episode around 52 to 45 was the primary result of the rollback, with volcanic centers forming to the east of the Okanogan Highlands along the Republic Graben and the highlands themselves subjected to an estimated 12 km (7.5 mi) of lateral extension, dropping the highlands elevation down to near modern heights and helping expose the Okanagan Dome with its magma pools as plutons.

During the last ice age successive waves of the Fraser glaciation engulfed the entire region under the Cordilleran ice sheet which heavily shaped much of the regional topography. At least five glacial advance and retreat cycles started around 19,000 years before present before starting the final waning at 11,000 ybp. The mountain topography was created by glacial advance, retreat, stagnation, and retreat again. Glacial debris settled into the previously narrow and deep valley structures, formed by the gneiss domes, filling the floor to its modern contours. Glacial erratics are present along the valley floor, and the valley bottom is dominated by glacial debris and cobble deposits forming terraces and pitted outwash-plains. Glacial kettles are scattered in the central Aeneas valley area, many now containing varying sized kettle lakes.

Mount Bonaparte is composed fully of Mount Bonaparte pluton granodiorite and quartz monzonite which were emplaced during the Okanogan Dome core complex orogenesis, and is the center of a small granitic pluton dated to 54 million years ago in age. Mineral reconnaissance and evaluations have not shown any economic metallic or non-metallic ore deposits in the pluton and no documented mining claims are present on Mount Bonaparte. This is notable as an exception to other plutons and pluton-gneiss contact zones of the Omineca crystalline belt in northeastern Washington and southern British Columbia which have productive gold, silver, and copper deposits.

== Climate ==
Reporting in March of 1935 by forest ranges engaged in game surveys in the region recorded a 4 ft (1.2 m) snowpack depth on the eastern slope of Mount Boanparte. Within the Köppen climate classification the area of northeastern Okanogan County has a humid continental climate (Dfb). The 30-year average temperature is 37.6 °F (3.1 °C), with an average yearly high of 69.8 °F (21.0 °C) in August, and an average low of 15.3 °F (−9.3 °C) in December. The average rainfall is 25.04 in (636 mm) per year. The wettest month is June, with 3.07 in (78 mm) of precipitation, while the driest is August, with 0.76 in (19 mm).

Climate data for Mount Bonaparte 48.7854 N, −119.1223 W, Elevation: 7,259.5 ft (2,212.7 m) (1991–2020 normals)
Month	Jan	Feb	Mar	Apr	May	Jun	Jul	Aug	Sep	Oct	Nov	Dec	Year
Mean daily maximum °F (°C)	27.8 (−2.3)	30.1 (−1.1)	35.5 (1.9)	43.2 (6.2)	53.0 (11.7)	59.2 (15.1)	69.2 (20.7)	69.8 (21.0)	61.0 (16.1)	46.4 (8.0)	32.3 (0.2)	26.0 (−3.3)	46.1 (7.9)
Daily mean °F (°C)	22.1 (−5.5)	23.3 (−4.8)	27.6 (−2.4)	34.1 (1.2)	42.9 (6.1)	48.7 (9.3)	57.6 (14.2)	58.1 (14.5)	50.5 (10.3)	38.3 (3.5)	26.8 (−2.9)	20.7 (−6.3)	37.6 (3.1)
Mean daily minimum °F (°C)	16.4 (−8.7)	16.6 (−8.6)	19.7 (−6.8)	24.9 (−3.9)	32.8 (0.4)	38.3 (3.5)	46.0 (7.8)	46.4 (8.0)	39.9 (4.4)	30.2 (−1.0)	21.3 (−5.9)	15.3 (−9.3)	29.0 (−1.7)
Average precipitation inches (mm)	2.24 (57)	1.89 (48)	2.32 (59)	2.17 (55)	2.48 (63)	3.07 (78)	1.69 (43)	0.76 (19)	1.28 (33)	1.70 (43)	2.87 (73)	2.57 (65)	25.04 (636)
Source: PRISM Climate Group

== Ecology ==
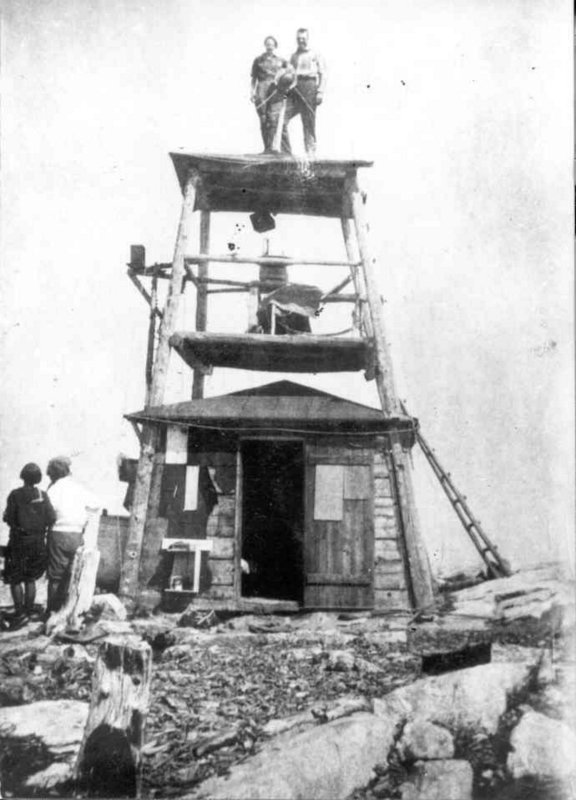
First Mount Bonaparte lookout, 1921

The mountains ecology is mixed with alpine conditions at the peak, subalpine forests near the peak grading into mixed conifer forests on the lower slopes with lake, meadow and bog environs around the mountain base. The soils over most of the mountain are derived from glacial tills though some areas have lacustrine sourced soils. Most of the soils have a fine texture but there are mixed fine and course areas as well. The finer soils have a higher water permeability, while the course soils have a higher stability factor. In the 2009 evaluation of the Mount Bonaparte Wilderness, the area was given a Bortle scale rating as Class 2, a Typically Truly Dark Sky Site. This is the second darkest sky on the scale, with very minimal light pollution, with the Milky Way easily visible to the naked eye during the summer, with clouds and landforms visible as black patches on the starscape.

=== Flora ===
The peak area of the mountain is characterized by low alpine brush and plants with scattered whitebark pine growing from a glacially polished granite landscape. The lower slopes of Mount Bonaparte have dense lodgepole pine and mixed conifer stands, and the highest elevations transition into steep rocky terrain and then barren rock at the summit and surrounding ridge tops. The southern slope and a portion of the northern slope from around 5,000 ft (1,500 m) up to the subalpine transition is dominated by lodgepole pine forest, while below that is mixed conifer forests. At the subalpine transition the forest switches into mixed subalpine fir and whitebark pine stands within a subalpine plants community. whitebark pine habitat is found in around four percent of the region, but the species is noted to be vulnerable to both mountain pine beetle and white pine blister rust. Dwarf mistletoe parasitism is frequently found in the Douglas fir stands. The valley floor at the southeast base of Mount Bonaparte is occupied by blue-bunch grass - big sagebrush prairie and a fen meadow along Bonaparte Creek. Early floral reports from the area included the violets Viola renifolia and Viola selkirkii collected from the slopes in 1914 and 1916. A species of shooting star, considered a Washington state plant of concern is also known from Bonaparte, while populations of noxious weeds are also present, with Houndstongue, orange hawkweed and yellow hawkweed reported across the area.

Nonvascular plants of the mountain include liverworts such as Barbilophozia hatcheri, Barbilophozia sudetica, Lophozia ventricosa, and Ptilidium pulcherrimum. Mosses from several families are present such as Coscinodon calyptratus, Dicranum fuscescens, Dicranum tauricum, Grimmia torquata Plagiothecium denticulatum, Sanionia uncinata.

=== Fauna ===
The area has a history of Mountain pine beetle infestation during the 1980s resulting in notable damage to lodgepole pine stands of the mountain. Similarly an estimated 300 acres (120 ha) of forest had been impacted by balsam woolly adelgids attacking the fir-tree species, especially subalpine fir. Great grey owls are documented occasionally in the area based on reporting in 1986. Several of the ridges around Mount Bonaparte are known winter habitat for blue grouse populations.

Mount Bonaparte has a long history of large mammals being residents of or transitory through the region. A November 1907 report by the Forest Supervisor of the time was included a mention of some 300 wild horses roaming the area of Mount Bonaparte. The herd was reported as leery of humans and considered a detriment to the range-land use of the area. Suggestions of rounding up or culling were deemed not practical. Around 1,600 acres (650 ha) of the region are considered prime white-tailed and mule deer winter habitat, a status which contributed to the 1929-1939 Bonaparte Preserve designation by Washington state.

In the 2009 assessment of the potential Mount Bonaparte Wilderness area, reviewers noted that the regional ecology is not prime habitat for several of the largest of the historic highlands predators, gray wolves, grizzly bears, or wolverines. The area does act as an important connection corridor between several larger wilderness areas that are prime habitat zones in the North Cascades and the Selkirks. The area is included in state efforts to reestablish and build up the Canadian lynx population across the highlands and Kettle River Range. The area is not consisted suitable for lynx residency or reproduction needs, but has a historical record of lynx reports. Ecologists consider the area to be a travel corridor between the Kettle River Range of Washington and the western Okanagan Highlands in southern British Columbia. Called a "steppingstone" area, individuals likely spend short amounts of time foraging or residing in the area and then move on.

Rocky Mountain bighorn sheep are found in the Mount Bonaparte area along with other sections of the Okanogan highlands, Cascades, and Selkirks. Herds in the region were classified as being the subspecies Washington bighorn sheep, Ovis canadensis californiana, based on specimens taken in the late 1800s through the early 1900s. By the 1935 the last bighorn sheep holdouts in the state had been extirpated and the species was not reintroduced into sections of its historic Washington range, including the Bonaparte Creek Mountain area, until reintroduction efforts between 1957 and 2014.

=== Wildlands fires ===
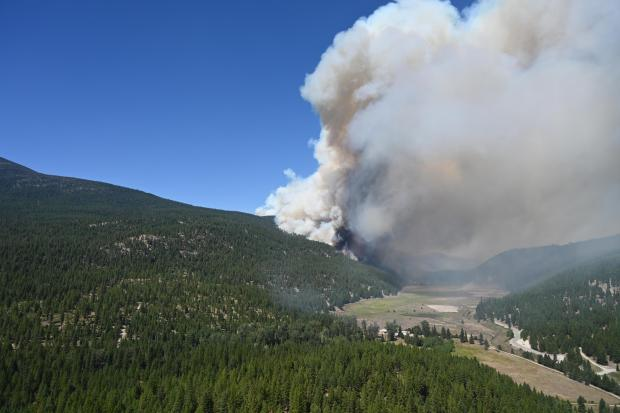
Smoke plume from the 2021 Walker Creek Fire

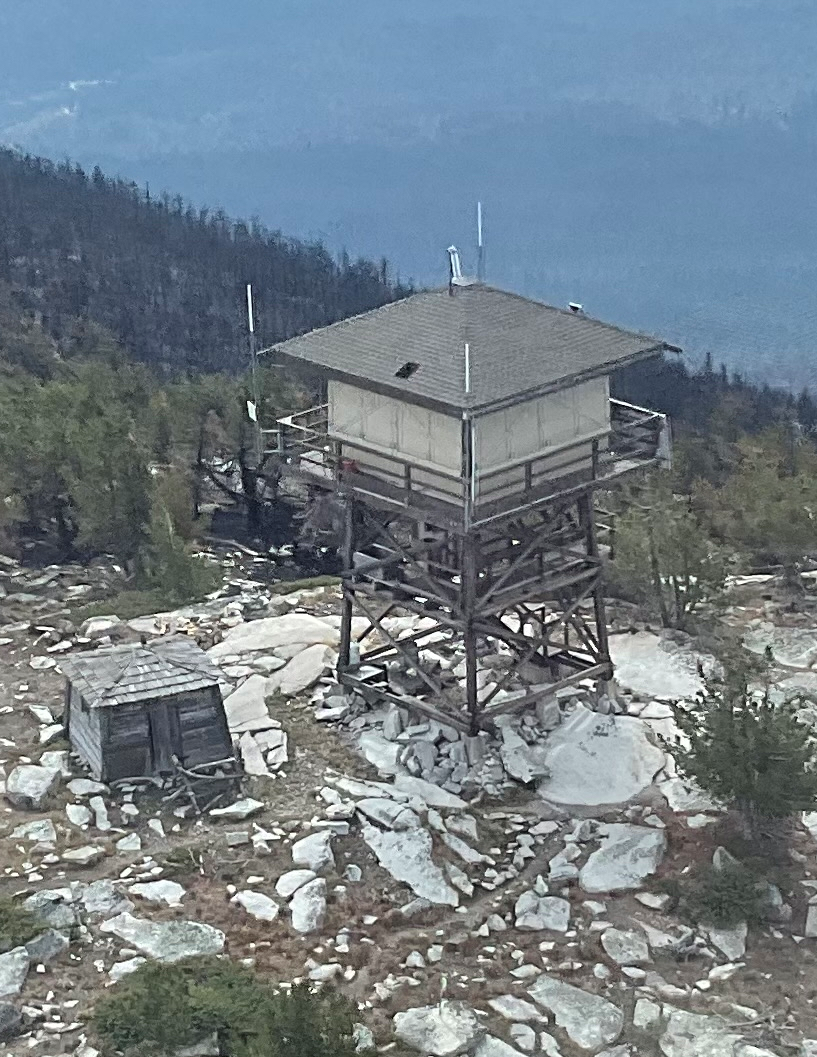
Both lookout structures after the Walker Creek Fire

Before the arrival of settlers from the east, Mount Bonaparte and the highlands had a history of low intensity fires at regular intervals which would burn though fire fuels frequently enough that high intensity fires were rare and larger diameter trees survived and fire adapted plants thrived. Tree groves consisted of widely spaced individuals with open seral meadow space between the trees. Over the last century Mount Bonaparte had a fire ecology history with over 19 various sized wildland fires documented since 1940.

The greater Bonaparte area was threatened by a human started wildfire during the summer of 1973 started on a hill near the Boy Scouts of America camp on Bonaparte Lake. The fire was first spotted on July 30th and grew to about 200 acres (81 ha) in size by July 31 with state and federal fire fighting crews working to manage it. The 60 persons in ground crews were supported by three air tankers. A wildlands fire crew from the Wind River Ranger District of southern Washington around the Columbia Gorge drove up and assisted in the containment process during the first week of August, 1973, The fire caused evacuations in the Bonaparte region, including summer camps to the north of the Mountain at lost Lake, but did not impact the community of Havillah to the west. By August 2 upwards of 600 personnel were assigned to the fire, which was between 1,000–1,500 acres (400–610 ha) in size. It was estimated the fire was fully surrounded by the evening of August 1, and crews were transitioning to mop up work within the fire perimeter. The fire line reached within .5 mi (0.80 km) of the camp border before finally being checked. During a three day period air tankers dumped 75,000 US gal (280,000 L) of retardant across the area. Efforts at replanting the burned area were undertaken a few years later by the forest service, with a mix of 75,000 Douglas fir and ponderosa pine seedlings being planted over the early spring of 1976.

The Walker Fire, including the smaller Spur Fire in 2021 burned over portions Mount Bonaparte and neighboring mountains, encompassing around 23,765 acres (9,617 ha). Starting in early August, the Spur fire had grown to a 50 acres (20 ha) fire and Okanogan County Emergency Management issued a level 3 evacuation order for the Mount Bonaparte area, just south of Bonaparte Lake north to Lost Lake. The evacuation perimeter was expanded on August 14 due to the area having the Walker Fire in addition to the Spur fire, and a total of over 3,000 acres (1,200 ha) being burned by that point. An evacuation center had been set up in Tonasket to help evacuees of the area. Due to the greater intensity of the Walker Creek Fire at high elevations in combination with varied land ownership and management, the burn scar area is a complex mosaic of effected landscapes. Some after effects of the fire have been problematic for the area, with road wash outs on of Bonaparte Lake road resulting from debris flows down Lightning Creek on the flank of Mount Bonaparte. Three large flows since 2022 have been responsible for road loss, private home destruction, and large sedimentation events in Bonaparte Creek.

Within the 2024 Okanogan County, Washington Community Wildfire Protection Plan, Mount Bonaparte and the immediate surrounding region such as Bonaparte Lake are not included in any of the defined regional fire districts. Rather the area, being mostly state and private forestland, is overseen by the Washington State Department of Natural Resources, which maintains mutual aid agreements with the surrounding fire districts of the Okanogan Highlands, districts number 12 though 14 and 16.

== Etymology ==
In his 1827 Sketch of Thompson's River District, Hudson's Bay Company fur trader Archibald McDonald documented two separate waterways named "Bonepate" in the north area of the Thompson's River region and in the southern Okanogan River area. While the etymologies of both the "Bonepates River" in the north and the "River Bonapate" on the Okanogan are hazy, it's considered most likely they are named for Napoleon Bonaparte who had died in 1821. An entry in Harr Wagners 1900 The New Pacific School Geography first states the mountain to be named for Napoleon. The mountain in the early 1900's was occasionally called Old Boney, with a 1904 record including the line

To the north, and almost in line with the pole, Mount Bonaparte, "Old Boney", looms up...

Some references both early and more modern have used the alternative name Bonaparte Peak for the mountain.

== History ==
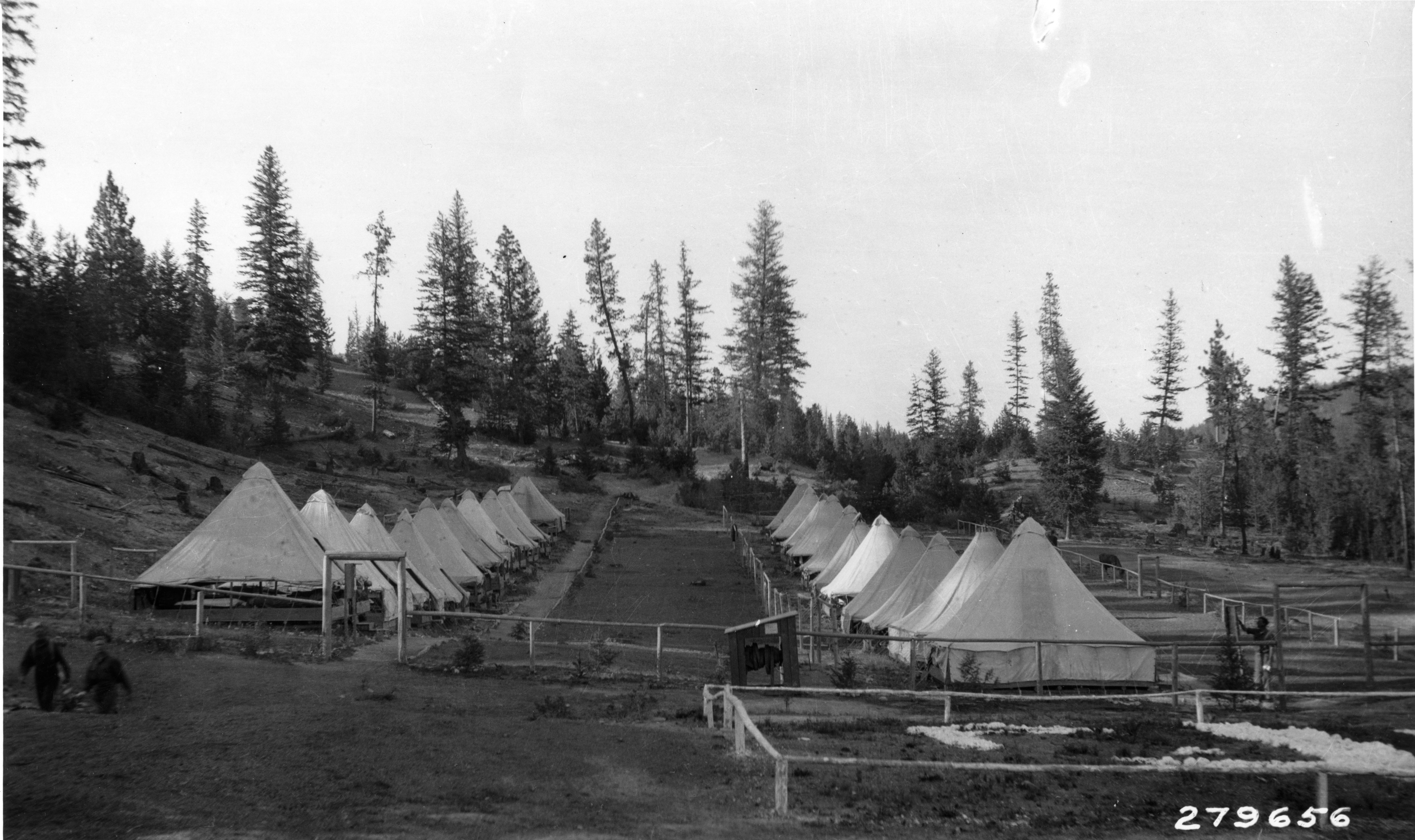
Civilian Conservation Corps "Camp Leese" 1933

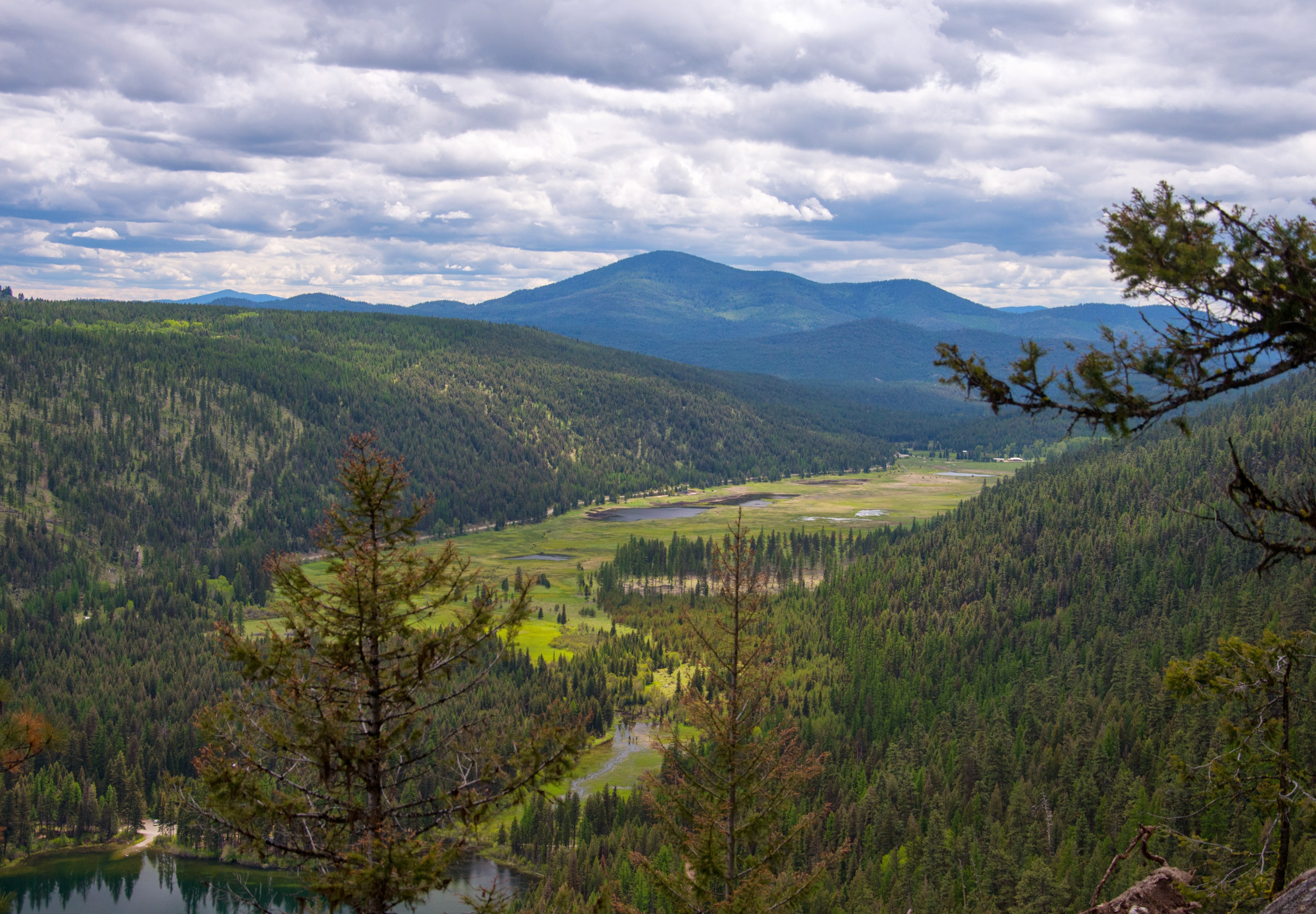
Bonaparte Meadows from the Pacific Northwest Trail

As the highest peak of the western Okanogan Highlands fire watching from the summit has a history starting as early as 1904. At that time a peak walker would camp on top of the mountain with a triangular tent as shelter. This practice was continued until 1914 when cabin and tower stand lookouts were instituted. The first group of permanent Forest service fire lookouts were constructed by the end of the 1915 summer and included Bonaparte, First Thought Mountain, Sherman Pass, and Vulcan Mountain. The summer also saw completion of telephone trunk lines out from Republic east to Kettle Falls and Marcus along with the farmers lines of the route. Westward, a trunk line was constructed south to West Fork on the Sanpoil River and then northwest though the Aeneas Valley and Anglin to Tonasket, Washington on the Okanogan River. A farmers line extended up to Wauconda to the southeast of Mount Bonaparte, and another line passed west of the mountain to reach Havillah just to the north west. To better accommodate the water needs of the lookout, a hand carved water cistern was bored into the granite of the mountain top. Filled using snow, snowmelt, and rain, the filled cistern provides treatable water over the summer months. During the summer of 1929 a larger lookout tower was funded and in summer 1930 constructed as replacement for the 1914 lookout. The new lookout was a 16 ft (4.9 m) tall wooden tower which supported a wooden lookout cabin. The cabin was a Region 5 style model, with a 14 ft × 14 ft (4.3 m × 4.3 m) footprint and acted as observatory and residence all in one room for the lookout person. In the early 1960's the second lookout was replaced with a third and final tower, upgrading to a 20 ft (6.1 m) tall tower with a region 6 cabin built from helicoptered in supplies, and which was still in place as of 2025.

The original 1914 cabin was nominated to the National Register of Historic Places as the Bonaparte Mountain Cabin by the Okanogan National Forest service in early 1981. The National Parks Service processed the nomination and accepted the placement on the register in April 1981. A decade and a half later in 1996 both surviving lookout structures, the 1914 cabin and the 1960 lookout, were nominated to the National Historic Lookout Register by the Washington Registrar, with both being accepted in February 1996.

For a period of time from 1929 to the summer of 1939, the Mount Bonaparte area was placed into the Bonaparte Reserve by the state. This designation as a Washington state game reserve prevented hunting on a 58,240 acres (23,570 ha) region, though grazing by ranchers was still permitted. An updated boundary for the preserve was issued by the Washington State Game Protector in 1937, with Mount Bonaparte fully encompassed in the preserve. The western boundary ran from Anglin north to Siwash Creek and then northeast to Havillah. The northern boundary ran along the forest service road east to Lost Lake, there turning south along Bonaparte Lake road as the eastern border. The southern bound was marked as what is now SR 20. On October 1, 1939 the Bonaparte Reserve, in addition to ten other state reserves, was decommissioned by the Washington game commission. The region was deemed prime mule deer hunting area.

With the onset of the Great Depression and implementation of President Franklin D. Roosevelts New Deal programs, a Civilian Conservation Corps (CCC) district was established in the region. The district was named for Fort George Wright in Spokane, Washington, which was the headquarters for the Fort George Wright District, and overseen by the Army Ninth Corps area command. The district was formed by May 1933, and soon after three temporary tent camps, T-4 "Togo" on Deadman Creek, T-5 "Leese" on Lost Lake just northeast of Mount Bonaparte, and T-6 "Midget" on Bolder Creek pass were opened. Camp Leese operated out of a tent camp though the summer doing improvement work across the Bonaparte Mountain area before being disbanded in November 1933.

Mount Bonaparte is within the Mount Bonaparte Potential Wilderness Area, part of the Tonasket Ranger District. The proposed protected area has been evaluated several times since the 1964 federal Wilderness Act was signed into law. During the forest services 1967 Roadless Area Review and Evaluation, "RARE I" review, an area surrounding Mount Bonaparte was identified as a potential reserve area. By the 1970s, with the "RARE II" evaluations, the area was adjusted to a proposed total of 10,790 acres (4,370 ha), which was divided into two segments, a 4,200 acres (1,700 ha) semi-primitive recreation area along with 9,200 acres (3,700 ha) of wildlife management area. The forest service released a 1989 updated evaluation which noted that since 1984 2,600 acres (1,100 ha) had already been impacted by logging and road construction, with the warning that at the rate of development and logging in the region, it would become ineligible for being maintained as wilderness or roadless by 2030. Two decades later the forest service revisited the RARE lands within the Okanogan highlands, covering the area as the Mount Bonaparte Potential Wilderness Area and readdressing its potential as a roadless region. By 2009 the total recommended area was down to 9,477 acres (3,835 ha) due to losses from road building and addition of other land parcels deemed viable wilderness. The report noted that the small area of the proposed wilderness could impact efforts to maintain it as a wilderness area, with human access surrounding the area on all sides and multiple access points around the proposed boundaries.

In the early 2020s efforts led by the Okanogan Land Trust built to conserve the Bonaparte meadows wetlands at the southeastern foot of Mount Bonaparte. The wetlands is located on Bonaparte Creek just downstream from Bonaparte Lake and was confirmed to be a calcareous fen, rare in Washington, in 2025. A $50,000 donation to the conservation effort was made by the North Central Washington Audubon Society in 2026.

== Access and recreation ==
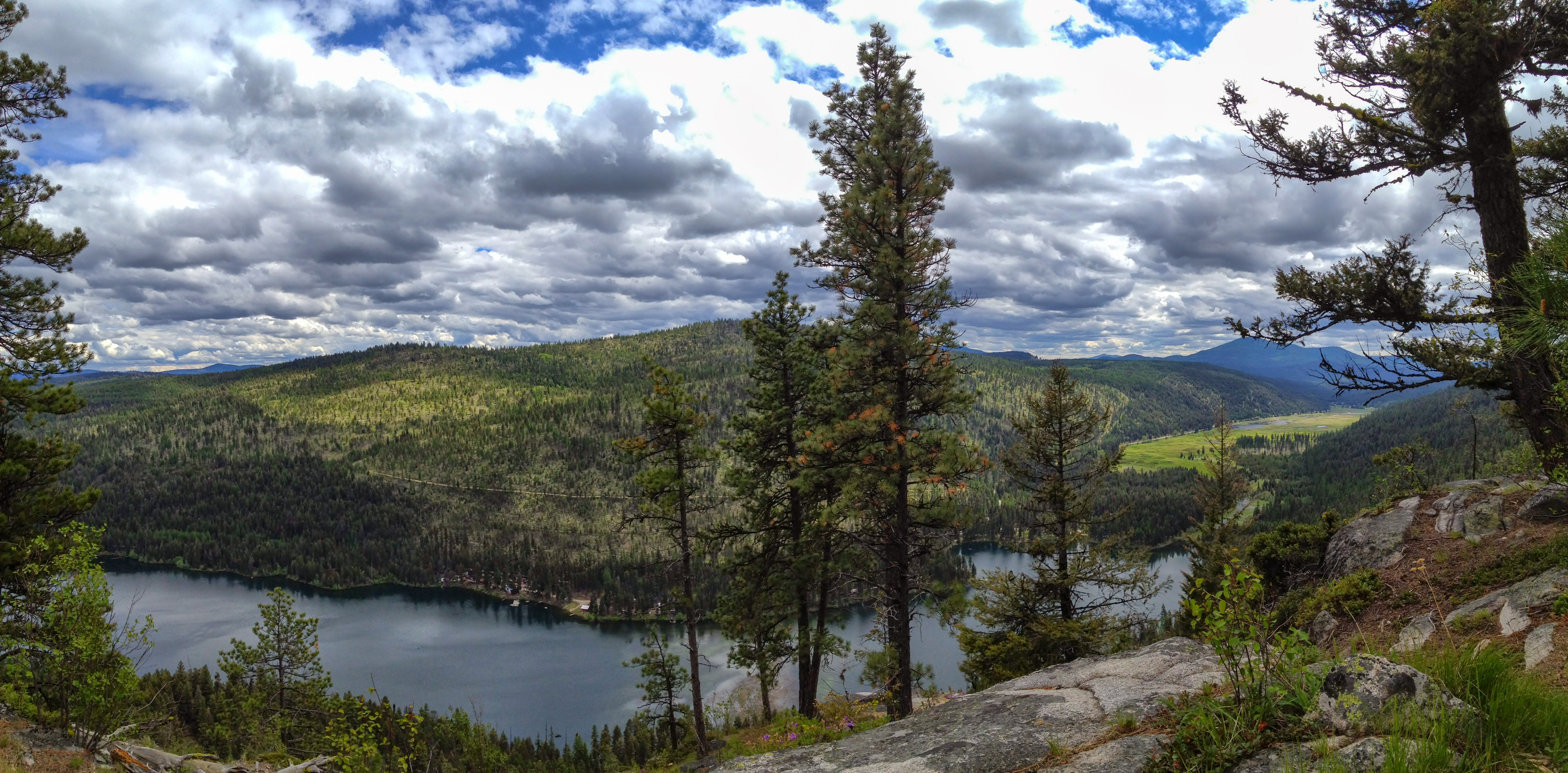
Bonaparte Lake and Strawberry Mountain from the Pacific Northwest Trail

During the spring summer and fall the mountain is a destination spot for hiking, horseback riding, mountain biking, and hunting. Over 15 miles of maintained trails encircle Mount Bonaparte, with some portions open to motorized ATV use as well. The primary route up the mountain is the 5.7 mi (9.2 km) long mixed use Bonaparte #306 trail open to hiking, ORV and horseback. It ascends the northern slope of Mount Boneparte and ends at the fire lookouts on the summit. While it is considered the most direct of the routes, its noted that ORV usage has impacted the trail surface and quality. Passing across along the southern slope of the mountain is the Pacific Northwest Trail, which overlaps several of the local trails including Pipsissewa Trail #383, South Side Trail #308, and Fourth of July Trail Ridge Trail #307 or Antoine Trail #304. The Antoine Trail route passes up the Antoine creek drainiage and passes the Napol cabin site, where the dilapidated trapper cabin was still visible in 2013. Taking the 4th of July Ridge trail will cross over the southwestern slope of Mount Bonaparte and by the Roggow Cabin which is still used seasonally by hikers and hunters.

Day visiting the lookout is a regular summer activity, with the staff working 9:30am to 6:00pm during the summer months. Viewing the surrounding area from the lookout gives sights of the Okanogan Valley, Mount Chopaka, and the North Cascades to the west, while the east is dominated by the ridgeline separating the Okanogan River drainage from the Sanpoil and Kettle River drainages. Due to the close location of Mount Bonaparte to the Canadian border, Chesaw and Buckhorn Mountain in Washington are visible, while Baldy Mountain 7,575 ft (2,309 m) across the border in British Columbia occupies the north horizon. South of the lookout provides vistas over Mount Anne, Moses Mountain, the Colville Reservation, and on very clear days reports have been given that Mount Rainier is visible on the southern horizon.

The region surrounding Mount Bonaparte is the seasonally operated Bonaparte Sno-Park. The Sno-park is maintained by Colville National Forests Tonasket Ranger District and is considered part of the greater Mount Baker/Methow region recreation sites. The site has an approximately 2 acres (0.81 ha) plowed parking area accessible via the Bonaparte Lake Road. Attached to the parking area is a system of motorized groomed snowmobile trails totaling 52 mi (84 km) that traverse parts of Mount Bonaparte, Spurr Mountain, Strawberry Mountain, and Cumberland Mountain. The Forest service opens the sno-park yearly on December 1 and maintains it until closure at March 31, with contracted trail grooming occurring twice a season, once at the start, and once in Late January to early February. As a winter use only park, the site is not improved with potable water or bathroom facilities. On the west northwestern slope of Mount Bonaparte and connecting to the greater Bonaparte sno-park is the Highlands Nordic Sno-park, which is accessed from the Havillah Road to the northwest. Consisting of over 22 mi (35 km) of groomed trails for cross country skiing and snowshoeing. The amenities are limited, with only a vaulted pit toilet, and a warming hut. The peak is also the site of an important regional radio repeater placement.

At the foot of the mountain and on the Northern shore of Bonaparte Lake is Camp Bonaparte, a Scouting America camp owned by the Chief Seattle Council. First opened in 1958, the camp is operated as a wilderness camp with minimal infrastructure on approximately 80 acres (32 ha)s land leased from the Colville National Forest and private logging companies.
