= Mount Bonaparte Lookout =

- Bonaparte Mountain Cabin
- U.S. National Register of Historic Places
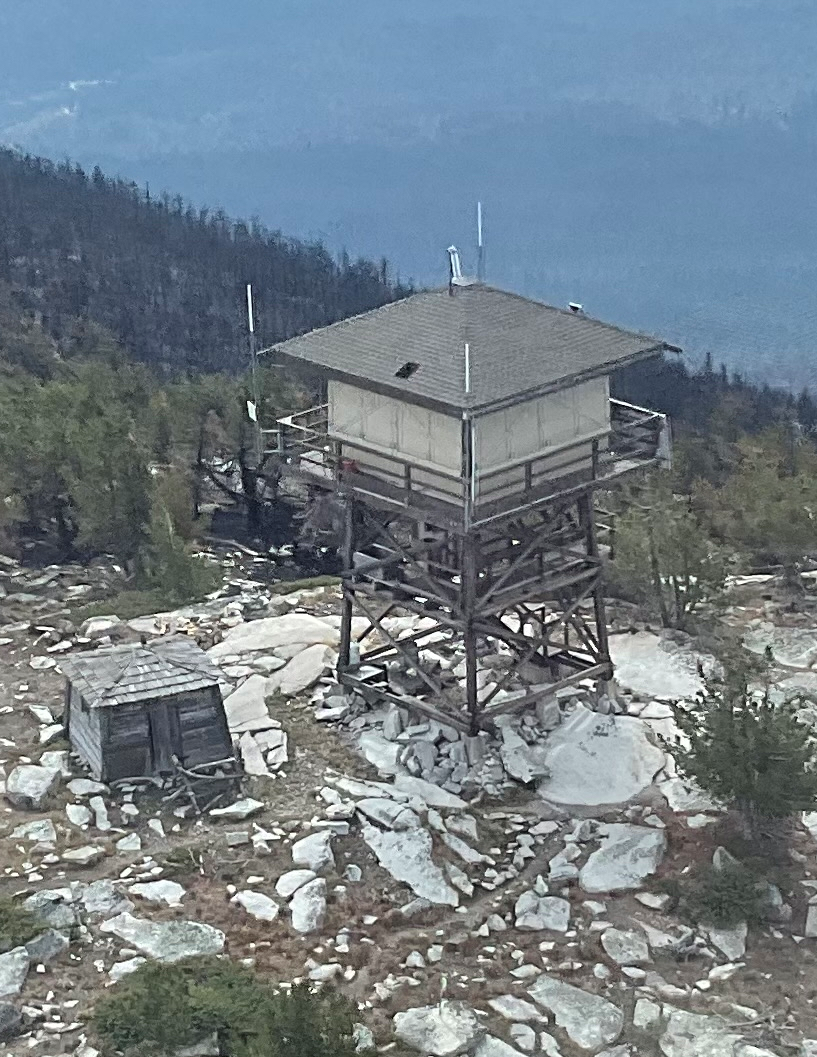
- Cabin and 1961 lookout in 2021

- Location within Washington (state)
- Location: Mount Bonaparte
- Nearest city: Tonasket, Washington
- Coordinates: 48°47′7″N 119°7′20″W
- Area: Less than one acre
- Built: 1914
- Architect: CC Reed
- Architectural style: Pioneer architecture
- Demolished: pre-1980 (tower platform)
- Restored: Summer 1971 (roof/walls)
- Visitation: "Several hundred"
- NRHP reference No.: 81000588
- Added to NRHP: April 20, 1981

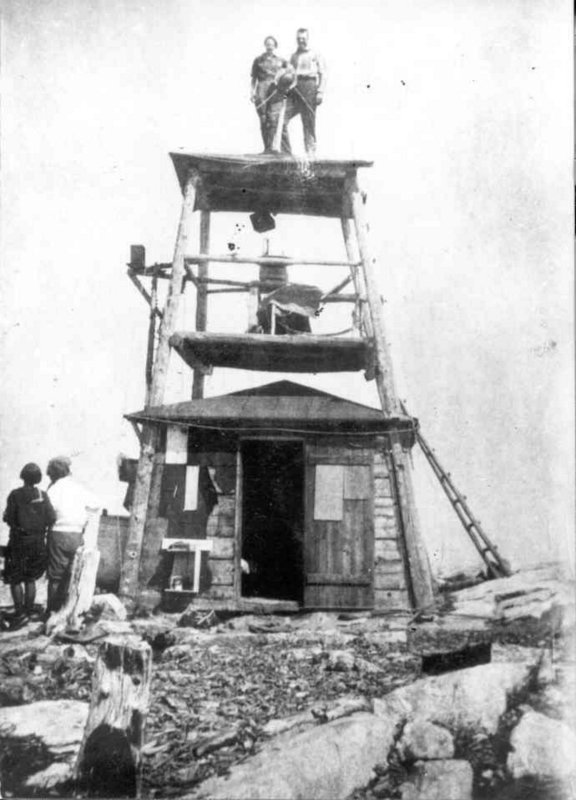
Lookout circa 1921

The Mount Bonaparte Lookout is a series of historic fire lookout towers on Mount Bonaparte in the Okanogan Highlands of Okanogan County, Washington, United States. The current 20 ft (6.1 m) fire tower stands at 7,259.5 ft (2,212.7 m) above sea level in the Colville National Forest. A series of three lookout towers have been in place on Mount Bonaparte since 1914, with fire watching from the site dating back to 1904. The first lookout, Bonaparte Mountain Cabin, was the first permanent lookout of the Colville National Forest. The cabin was actively used until 1930, when a second lookout was next to it to the north. The second lookout was taller with the cabin at the top of the tower, and in service from 1930 through 1960. In about 1961, the current lookout and its 20 ft (6.1 m) tall tower were installed, remaining in forest service control and use until 2025, when the staffing transitioned to volunteers. The original 1914 cabin has been listed in the National Register of Historic Places, while both it and the 1960 lookout are included as a single entry on the National Historic Lookout Register.

The lookout is accessible from several trail bases around Mount Bonaparte and then via the Bonaparte trail, #306, for the last accent. The lookout area has been threatened by wildfires, with the 2021 Walker and Spur Mountain Fires coming very close to the summit area. On clear days the North Cascades are visible, along with Chopaka Mountain, Baldy Mountain, the Colville Reservation and at the very horizon Mount Rainier. In 1997 the four-year average for visits was 400 people and 100 visit days.

== Description ==
The first lookout on Mount Bonaparte, circa 1904, was a solitary man keeping watch from the summit with a tent set for shelter. After ten years of temporary tent shelters for the fire watchers, a cabin with lookout platform was erected in 1914, one of several built in that year designed by Forest Supervisor CC Reed. Now known as the Bonaparte Mountain Cabin, it has a square outline with a 12 ft × 12 ft (3.7 m × 3.7 m) base and a pyramidal outline sloping inwards at about 15° to the low roofline. The walls were constructed from square cut logs stacked horizontally and dovetailed together at the corners with the adjoining wall logs. A mortar was applied to the joints between the logs to fully weatherproof the cabin interior. Placed at the center of the west wall is a solid plank door, and single sash, six paned windows spread between all four walls illuminated the interior by day.Inside the walls are unfinished log, while the floor is smoothed planks. The log ends at the corners were square-sawed and trimmed with the support logs for the view platform set into the corner. With the original building, the roof was made from heavy sheets of corrugated steel, thought to be salvaged from a mining building in the region.

From the four corners of the cabin the long peeled log poles extended above the roof and supported a lookout platform 15 ft (4.6 m) tall with a platform and roof cover. Before telephone lines were installed linking the lookout to the lost Lake Ranger Station to the northeast, a heliograph was fixed into the viewing platform center for signaling information down to observers via Morse code. While being on a mountain top and used for detection of storm cause fires, the original lookout tower did not have any lightning protection system. The tower remained in use through the 1920's before being transitioned to a storage shed after the lookout platform and top roof were removed in 1930. The cabin was refurbished in 1971 to prevent further structural decay at that time, with the roof being replaced with wood shingling, the door was replaced, and the original fixed place windows were changed out for casement windows. Additionally a bed and wood stove were installed inside. By the 1990s several wall logs were rotted through and in need of replacement. On the interior walls of the cabin are nearly a centuries worth of graffiti carved and written on the wall faces.

The 1930 to 1960 era lookout was larger in footprint and taller than the original 1914 cabin. The lookout was comprised of a 16 ft (4.9 m) tall wooden tower which supported a wooden lookout cabin. The cabin was a Region 5 style model, with a 14 ft × 14 ft (4.3 m × 4.3 m) footprint and designed to act as both observatory and residence all in one room for the stationed lookout person. The tower was built to align with the cardinal directions for best use of fire location survey equipment. In furthering that goal, the all four upper walls were made of plate glass windows, and the door had a large window in the upper half as well, providing the least obstruction to sightlines from the cabin. Notably the windows were purposely installed at 1 in (25 mm) off from plumb, true vertical, specifically to reduce the possibility of sun glare when sighting on a fire. The windows were all paired with a tight fitting external shutter which was hinged along the top edge. When occupied the shutters would be fixed in an open position and act as shades for the windows. They would be closed down in the off season or inclement weather and form a tight seal over the single pane glass windows. Affixed to the shingled roof was a lightning prevention system wired down the tower to a grounding point on the rock face of the mountain. Centered inside the cabin was the fire finder stand and telephone with a walkway space around it, while along the walls were a bed, table, stove, and chest. The fourth wall had built in cabinets, sets of drawers, and a cooler.

The 1961 replacement tower is a 20 ft (6.1 m) wood construction with a Region 6 flat top cabin which was made in prefabricated sections. Region 6 cabins were designed in the 1950s by the Pacific Northwest Region Forest service architects. Notably the overall footprint of the cabin was increased to a 15 ft × 15 ft (4.6 m × 4.6 m) square plus external walkway on all sides. The roof was flat and tarred rather than shingled as a cost saving measure and reduction in the hazards of reshingling the elevated cabin. The large pane-windows did not have manual shutters on the outside, and most of the construction used plywood and not timbers. Upgrades to the lookout since 1960 have included newer communications arrays and installation of solar panels.

== Access and recreation ==
The Mount Bonaparte Lookouts are positioned on the summit of Mount Bonaparte at an elevation of 7,259.5 ft (2,212.7 m). The mountain is the highest mountain in the Washington section of the Okanagan Highlands and the third-highest Washington peak east of the Okanogan River. It rises between the unincorporated communities of Havillah and Wauconda, while the closest cities are Tonasket to the southwest and Republic to the southeast.

The primary route up the mountain is the 5.7 mi (9.2 km) long mixed use Bonaparte #306 trail open to hiking, ORV and horseback. It ascends the northern slope of Mount Boneparte and ends at the fire lookouts on the summit. While it is considered the most direct of the routes, it is noted that ORV usage has impacted the trail surface and quality. Passing across along the southern slope of the mountain is the Pacific Northwest Trail, which overlaps several of the local trails including Pipsissewa Trail #383, South Side Trail #308, and Fourth of July Trail Ridge Trail #307 or Antoine Trail #304. The Antoine Trail route passes up the Antoine creek drainage while the 4th of July Ridge trail crosses over to the southwestern slope of Mount Bonaparte from the eponymous ridgeline.

Day visiting the lookout is a regular summer activity, with the staff working 9:30am to 6:00pm during the summer months. Both a hitching post for horses and a picnic table are available for visitors to the summit area. Viewing the surrounding area from the lookout gives sights of the Okanogan Valley, Mount Chopaka, and the North Cascades to the west, while the east is dominated by the ridgeline separating the Okanogan River drainage from the Sanpoil and Kettle River drainages. Due to the close location of Mount Bonaparte to the Canadian border, Chesaw and Buckhorn Mountain are seen in Washington, while Baldy Mountain 7,575 ft (2,309 m) across the border in British Columbia is seen in the distiance. South of the lookout provides vistas over Mount Anne, Moses Mountain, the Colville Reservation, and on very clear days reports have been given that Mount Rainier is visible on the southern horizon. Visitation records published in 1997 documented the lookout, on a four-year average, received 400 people with an average of 100 visitation days.

== History ==
The site of the Bonaparte Lookout stations was first used as a fire lookout spot starting in 1904. From 1904 until 1914 when the first lookout cabin was built, men stationed at the site were sheltered by a tent only. Over the 1914 summer both the Columbia Mountain and Mount Bodie lookout cabins were first constructed, using the same plans. In addition the Bonaparte lookout ranger signaled early warning of a fire near the Republic Brewery and the Republic outskirts of Republic. The phone call alerted the Republic fire crews and the conflagration was extinguished before it grew too large. The first group of permanent Forest service fire lookouts were finished by the end of the 1915 summer and comprised the Mount Bonaparte, First Thought Mountain, Sherman Pass, and Vulcan Mountain lookouts. The summer also saw completion of telephone trunk lines east to Kettle Falls and Marcus along with the "farmers lines" of the route. Westward, a trunk line was constructed south to West Fork on the Sanpoil River and then northwest though the Aeneas Valley and Anglin to Tonasket, Washington, on the Okanogan River. A farmers branch extended up to Wauconda to the southeast of Mount Bonaparte, and another branch passed west of the mountain to reach Havillah just to the north west.

The forest service opened an office at Chesaw in early 1921 which was then connected via telephone to the ranger station at Lost Lake. The station acted as a telephone node for the lookouts on Bonaparte, Bodie Mountain, and east to the forest head office in Republic, Washington. By 1923 the lookout was deemed one of the five primary fire lookouts in the Colville forest, each equipped with telephone connection, tower or cabin, and a standard firefinder. It was supported by a network of secondary lookouts and also a ranger stationed in the Aeneas Valley area patrolling the valley bottom. For the 1929 fire season the Bonaparte Lookout was one of 12 manned fire lookouts spread across the Colville National Forest. All twelve of the lookouts were fitted with telephones which connected to the central reporting hub in Republic.

Forest service monetary funds allocations were received by the district offices in late March 1929. Within the funds a $1,000 (equivalent to about $18,800 in 2025) line item was designated to the Bonaparte Lookout House for work during the summer season. The raw timber and materials for the new lookout had been bought and arrived in Republic by fall. During October the lumber was transported to the mountain summit on 12 horse pack teams and as of November 22 the supplies were prepared for winter storage before construction during 1930. By June 20 the 12 men hired for summer lookout work, including B. Forrester of Chesaw for Bonaparte, were assembled in Republic for a training and instructional day before being sent to the lookouts. The men would serve from late June though the end of September, and only receive supplies restock shipments once a month. Since there were no utilities at the lookout besides a telephone, a lookout employee during the 1929 summer hand carved a water cistern into the granite of the mountain top. The cistern would be filled with snow and snowmelt in the winter and spring, providing enough treatable water to fulfill the lookout needs over the summer. As of 2017 the cistern was still a main water source for lookout staff.

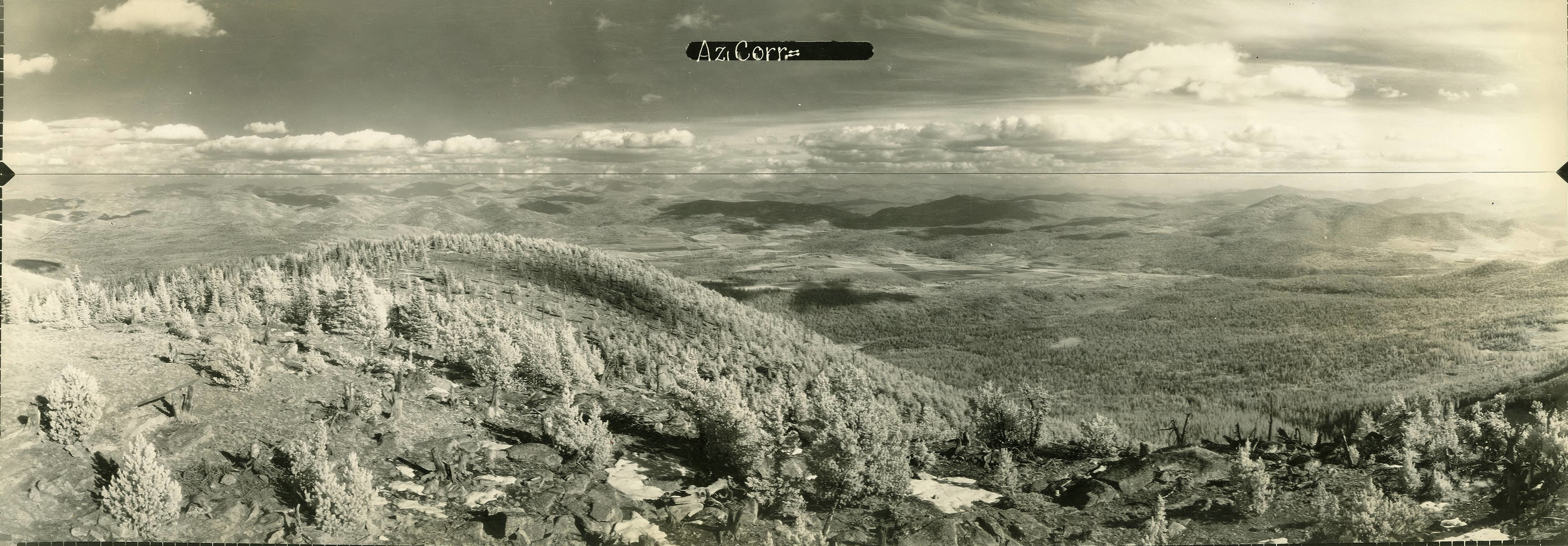
60° to 180°

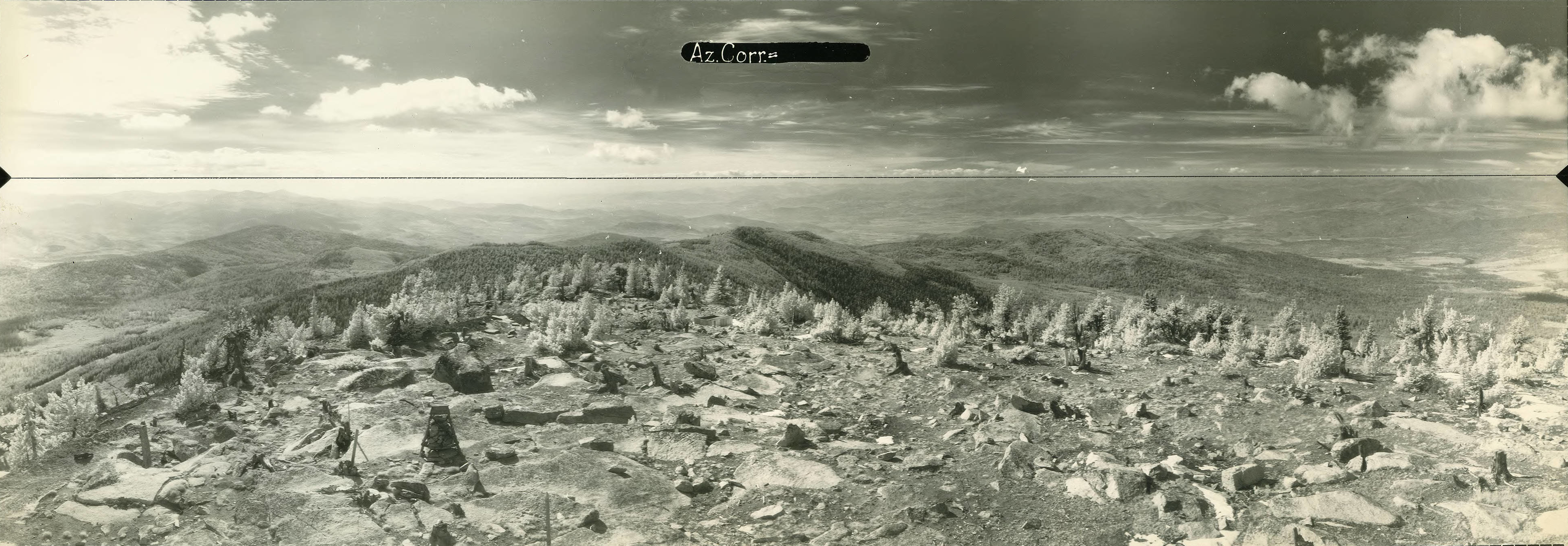
180° to 300°

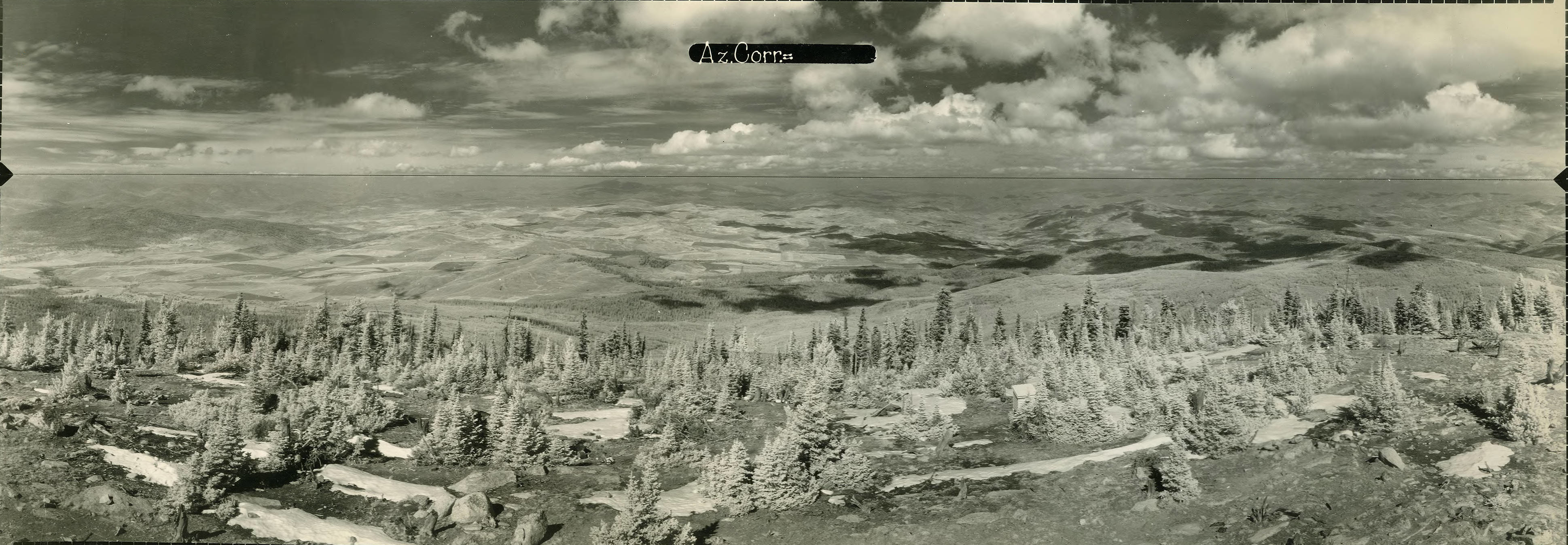
300° to 60°

Mount Bonaparte lookout panoramic azimuths, c. 1934

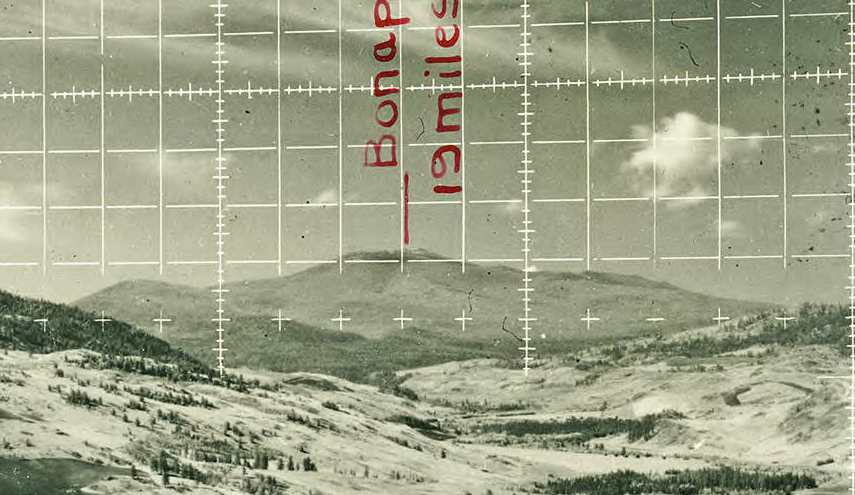
Mount Bonaparte from Lindsay lookout in British Columbia

In 1960–1961, some sources state 1963, a third lookout was commissioned and completed while the 1930 lookout was decommissioned, eventually being fully demolished leaving only the foundation. The 20 ft (6.1 m) replacement tower is topped with a Region 6 flat top cabin. The cabin was brought up the mountain and lowered into place on the tower by a helicopter, rather than brought up the trails as the prior two towers were.

As of 1964, the lookout was staffed with a lookout and restocking happened by two men assisted by a motorized trail crawler machine. It was the center of a group of five lookouts monitoring the northern Okanogan Highlands. To the east it was supported by the Bodie Mountain Lookout, to the southeast, the Cornell Butte Lookout, to the south west the Tunk Mountain Lookout and to the north, the Canadian Kabau Lookout. While all supported each other, Bonaparte, Tunk, and Cornell Butte were operated by the Washington State Department of Natural Resources, while Bodie was a Colville National Forest asset.

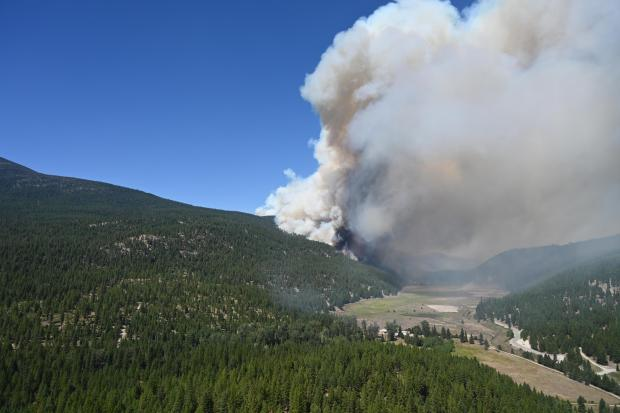
Walker Creek fire smoke plume rising from the north face of Mount Bonaparte in 2021

The greater Bonaparte area was threatened by a wildfire during the summer of 1973 started on a hill near the Boy Scouts of America camp on Lake Bonaparte. The fire was first spotted on July 30 and grew to about 200 acres (81 ha) in size by July 31 with state and federal fire fighting crews working to manage it. The 60 persons in ground crews were supported by three air tankers. A wildlands fire crew from the Wind River Ranger District of southern Washington around the Columbia Gorge drove up and assisted in the containment process during the first week of August 1973, The fire caused evacuations in the Bonaparte region, including summer camps to the north of the Mountain at lost Lake, but did not impact the community of Havillah to the west. By August 2 upwards of 600 personnel were assigned to the fire, which was 1,000–1,200 acres (400–490 ha) in size. It was estimated the fire was fully surrounded by the evening of August 1, and crews were transitioning to mop up work within the fire perimeter.

For a time in the early 1980s the lookout was equipped with a custom salvage and rescue built baby grand piano. In 1982, long time lookout operator Peter Jeter and student at Cornish College of the Arts bought parts from a burnt out piano for $50. The salvaged components including keys, a piano harp, plus assorted other parts, for the remaining needs he mail ordered replacements from New Jersey. He brought the pieces to the lookout via backpack, boxes and a borrowed forest service trail motorcycle. Over the next year he assembled a new frame and legs for the case from scrap wood. It was ready to play within a year and Jeter spent the next two years fine-tuning it.

The original 1914 cabin was nominated to the National Register of Historic Places as the Bonaparte Mountain Cabin by the Okanogan National Forest service in early 1981. The National Parks Service processed the nomination and accepted the placement on the register in April 1981. A decade and a half later in 1996 both surviving lookout structures, the 1914 cabin and the 1960 lookout, were nominated to the National Historic Lookout Register by the Washington Registrar, with both being accepted in February 1996.

In the early 2000s the lookout cabin was renovated and modernized, with the replacement of the flat tar roof with a low hipped roof. During August 2021 the Walker Fire, including the smaller Spur Fire again threatened the lookout. Due to the fire growth Okanogan County Emergency Management issued a level 3 evacuation order for the Mount Bonaparte area, just south of Bonaparte Lake north to Lost Lake. The combined fires burned over portions Mount Bonaparte and neighboring mountains, encompassing around 23,765 acres (9,617 ha), but sparing the peak area and lookouts. Staffed by the forest service yearly, the lookout was slated to officially be decommissioned in 2025; however, staffing was instead turned over to the Forest Fire Lookout Association.
