= Okanagan Basin =

Coordinates: 49°32′N 119°35′W

The Okanagan Basin spans two countries and comprises the basin of Okanagan Lake, the Okanogan River and tributary valleys such as that of the Similkameen and Chelan Rivers. In Canada the basin constitutes two distinct regions within British Columbia, the Similkameen Country to the west and the main Okanagan region running from the communities of Osoyoos in the south to Armstrong in the north – incorporating most of the three Okanagan regional districts and is usually known as "the Okanagan" or as the Okanagan Valley or the Okanagan Country. In the United States, the Okanogan Country is the western, lowland core of Okanogan County, which like its Canadian counterpart has a history and economy based on ranching, gold, fruit orcharding and vineyards, but the basin includes Lake Chelan and other flanking valleys. Communities in Washington's Okanogan Basin include Pateros, Omak, Okanogan, Oroville and Brewster.

Almost 200 km long and 8000 km^{2} in area, the Canadian portion of the Okanagan watershed is approximately 2/3 the size of Vancouver Island. Okanagan Lake dominates the basin which contains many small lakes and watercourses. The Okanagan Valley was carved out by glaciers, and when the ice retreated approximately 10,000 years ago, the Canadian portion of the basin was filled with one huge waterbody, Lake Penticton. The Valley was scoured to something like its current state when an ice dam at the southern end of Lake Penticton melted, emptying most of the valley.

The Canadian Environmental Grantmakers’ Network considers the Okanagan Basin to be the most arid watershed in Canada, with an urgent need for effective water management. The Okanagan Basin Water Board was established more than 35 years ago, to provide leadership on regional water issues, taking a basin-wide perspective and seeking collaborative solutions.

== See also ==
- Okanagan Highland
- Thompson Plateau
