= Trango =

Trango may refer to:

- TranGO, a public transit agency in Washington, US
- Trango Towers, a rock formation in Pakistan
- Trango Glacier, in Pakistan
