= Wauconda Pass =

Mountain pass in Washington

- Interactive map of Wauconda Pass
- Elevation: 4,310 ft (1,310 m)
- Traversed by: State Route 20

Third Approach
- Location: Okanogan County, Washington, United States
- Range: Okanogan Highlands
- Coordinates: 48°43′34″N 118°57′34″W

Wauconda Pass (el. 4310 ft./1314 m.) is a high mountain pass in the state of Washington, east of the town of Wauconda. It is traversed by State Route 20.
