= Aeneas Valley =

Valley in Washington, US

Aeneas Valley Eneas Valley, San Puell Pass
- Valley
- Southern Aeneas Valley
- Interactive map of Aeneas Valley
- Coordinates: 48°32′51″N 118°58′43″W
- Range: Okanogan Highlands
- Part of: Columbia Mountains
- Water bodies: Peony Creek, West Fork Sanpoil Creek
- Age: 61–49 Ma
- Formed by: Okanogan Gneiss Dome emplacement
- Geology: extensional uplift
- Etymology: Chief Aeneas

Dimensions
  - Length: Approx 15 mi (24 km)
  - Width: Approx 8 mi (13 km)
- Highest elevation: approx 6,000 ft (1,800 m)
- Surface elevation: 2,200–2,600 ft (670–790 m)

Aeneas
- Unincorporated community
- Location within Washington (state) Location within the United States
- Coordinates: 48°32′51″N 118°58′43″W
- Country: United States
- State: Washington
- County: Okanogan
- Established: 1908
- Named for: Chief Aeneas
- Elevation: 2,454 ft (748 m)
- Time zone: UTC-8 (Pacific (PST))
  - Summer (DST): UTC-7 (PDT)
- Postal code: 98855
- Area code: 509
- GNIS feature ID: 1515736

Aeneas Valley (/ˈiːniːəs/) is a primarily north–south trending depression located in the western slopes of the Okanogan Highlands in Okanogan County, Washington, United States. It takes its name from Syilx leader Chief Aeneas Someday. The valley is formed between several intrusion plutons and was shaped by activity of the Cordilleran ice sheet. It is part of both the Bonaparte Creek and Sanpoil River watersheds, and contains a group of kettles and kettle lakes.

The valley has one unincorporated community, Aeneas, near the southern end, plus a general store in the south central valley. Access into the valley has changed since the 1890s, with a shift from general travel into the valley from the southeast to regular travel in from the northwest. Mail service was provided via a post office in Aeneas from 1908 to the early 1970s, when the office was closed. Electrification of the valley was not completed until 1952.

The valley is subject to yearly fire seasons due to frequent lightning during dry summer months. Several major fires have come close to sweeping through the valley in the past 20 years.

== Geology ==
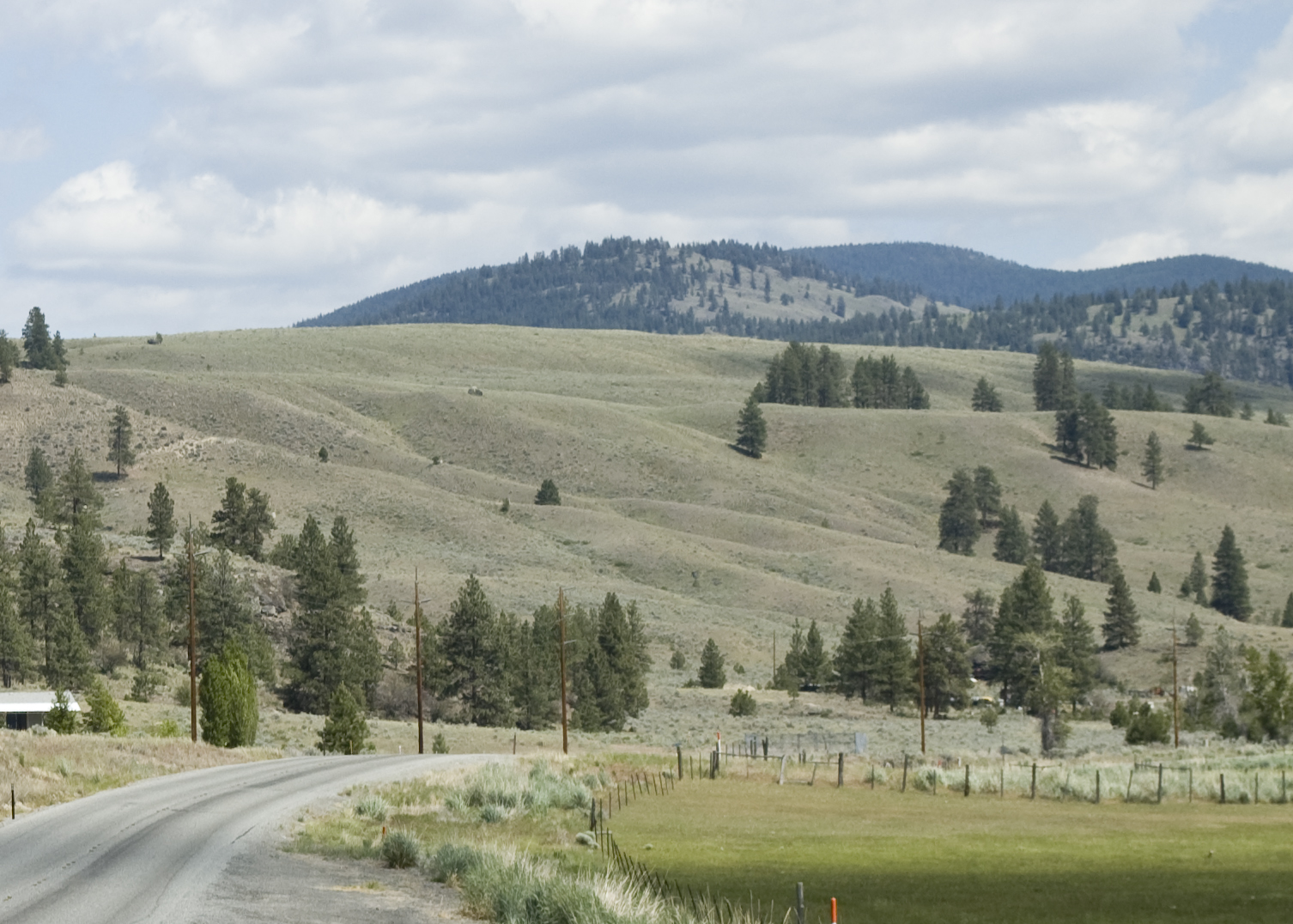
Glacial moraines along the valley sides

The Okanogan Highlands and the Aeneas Valley are in the eastern half of Washington's accreted terranes, which started to meld onto the western edge of the North American plate in the Mesozoic. By the Eocene, deep mantle bubbles of semiliquid rock had pushed up through detachment faults forming the Okanogan Gneiss Dome, with the western slopes of the dome having "slid" from the upper dome areas into their current placement as flatirons along the eastern edge of the Okanogan River Valley. The Aeneas Valley is nested between the ridges of the Okanogan Gneiss Dome proper to the west and southwest, while on the southwest and south are mountains of the Moses Mountain pluton, and to the northeastern side are the slopes and ridges of the Mount Bonaparte pluton. The Aeneas valley ends in the north at its escarpment face junction on Bonaparte Valley while gradually narrowing over the valley course southeast before transforming into the narrow West Fork Sanpoil drainage.

During the last ice age the entire region was engulfed by the Cordilleran ice sheet which rounded much of the upper mountain topography. The valley floor topography was created by glacial advance and then retreat, stagnation, and retreat again. Glacial debris settled into the previously narrow and deep valley structure formed by the gneiss domes filling the floor to its modern contours. Glacial erratics are present along the valley floor, and the valley bottom is dominated by glacial debris and cobble deposits forming terraces and pitted outwash-plains. Glacial kettles are scattered in the central valley area, many now containing varying sized kettle lakes.

== Ecology ==
Land ownership in the valley is mostly a mixture of private properties and those managed by the Washington State Department of Natural Resources, with the valley surrounded by, and in parts, part of the Colville National Forest. The valley bottom has a mix of private land and private forest lands, interspersed with Department of Natural Resources lots. Conversely the upper slopes of the valley along with the southeastern end are all national forest. Of the land not in the national forest, usage is predominantly held as non-agricultural parcels, though there is a scattering of range land areas, dry, and irrigated cropland. The surrounding forests are dominated by ponderosa pine with mixed scattered Douglas fir and the occasional western larch. The United States Environmental Protection Agency classifies the valley as part of the greater Northern Rocky Mountain ecoregion, and is further considered part of the "Western Okanogan semiarid Foothills", an arid temperate steppe.

The northern portion of the valley is in the greater Bonaparte Creek drainage basin (148 sq mi (380 km^{2})) while the southern portion is in the West Fork Sanpoil River drainage and the greater Sanpoil River drainage basin. The area of the kettles in the central valley is between the hydrological divide of the greater Peony Creek and West Fork Sanpoil River drainages. Surface water flow north of the kettle area drains to Bonaparte Creek, while water to the south flows to the Sanpoil, however water in the Kettle area proper flows into the kettle lakes and the underlying aquafer. Many of the smaller streams and some of the larger ones, Such as Cape Labelle Creek, are seasonal. The glacial fill in the north forms a permeable aquafer connected to the Bonaparte Valley. The three largest Kettle lakes are Long, Ell, and Round Lake, all of which have year round water. In contrast some of the shallower kettles may have intermittent lakes when the water table is higher, or after intercepting surface water that pools before slowly seeping into the aquafer below. Groundwater has been measured to gradually flow though the ground between lakes. The groundwater flow is divided between the north and south approximately at Cape Labelle Creek, which is an estimated 2.5 mi (4.0 km) south of the central kettle lakes area and the surface water divide.

Stretches of the slow moving streams along the valley floor are surrounded by marshy grounds. A test bore 1.5 mi (2.4 km) southeast of the former post office site included 5 ft (1.5 m) of weakly acidic peat overlying sands, gravels, and then a clay layer. Plants in the areas of small peatbog on the stream shores include herbaceous cattails, Knotweeds, marsh fivefinger, and sedges while the woody plants include birches and willows. The valley floor is a mixture of isolated areas of scrub and native grasses surrounded by grazing pastures, agricultural fields and stands of ponderosa Pine. Aspen and sumac groves in the upper areas of the valley have been noted for producing "especially beautiful" fall colors.

The three named Kettle lakes are all seeded with rainbow trout each spring for sport fishing. Long lake formerly hosted a population of pumpkinseed sunfish, however the lake was treated with the piscicide rotenone to remove the population and improve trout conditions in the early 2000s.

The valley is a noted breeding spot for Bobolinks near the western edge of the species range, and a possible area of Columbian sharp-tailed grouse habitat.

While the greater Okanogan Highlands are a center for Gray wolf return in Washington, the Aeneas Valley is not part of any established pack range. Historically wolves ranged across the full northern half of the county, but by the early 1900s sightings were becoming sparse, with one report of a pack of about 12 in the Aeneas Valley area. As of 2024, one pack and a lone wolf have ranges that approach the borders of the valley, with Hayden, a lone wolf, and the Strawberry pack to the Southwest and south respectively. Only the Scatter pack has territory that enters the overall valley, with a small area in the southeastern end of the valley, extending from there over the West Fork Sanpoil River course.

=== Wildfires ===
The valley is subject to yearly fire season conditions, with the region being prone to summer lightning strikes. In 2015 the valley was threatened by the Okanogan Complex fires with the Tunk Block fire approaching on the southwest and the Northstar fire on the southeast. Prior to summer 2015, sections of the Colville National Forest along the southern and eastern edges of the valley had been treated to reduce the potential fire fuel load present. Under forest service oversight, the sections were systematically thinned to open up the forest canopy and removed fuel ladder potentials. The sections were then subjected to controlled burns in cool weather conditions to further deplete the fuel sources in the areas. These sections provided buffer against the spread of the two fires, changing the fire direction and facilitating burnouts before the valley proper was impacted. During the fires upwards of 400 firefighters were stationed within the valley.

A large portion of the valley, from Peony Creek Road in the Northwest to just past the Aeneas Valley General Store in the southeastern central valley is included in Okanogan County Fire District#16. The district encompasses a total of 51.5 sq mi (133 km^{2}) including the greater valley sides and some surrounding territory, but is crewed by an all volunteer force averaging 20 people. The equipment of the district is considered aging, with all vehicles being from the 1990s or older and there is only a single 2-bay fire station. Much of the equipment is stored at volunteers private residences, or out in the weather. Additionally there is only well water sourcing in the valley so fires are fought with heavy use of water tenders.

== Chief Aeneas ==
The valley takes its name from Syilx leader Chief Aeneas Someday (/ˈiːniːəs/) who lead a group of Syilx peoples living west of the Okanogan River. The French travelers in the region first gave him the name Chief Ignace (French pronunciation: [iɲas]), but the spelling was changed by early English settlers to Aeneas as a reference to the Greek demigod Aeneas. With the influx of white settlers to the region in the 1860s tensions grew between them and Chief Aeneas' young men. Due to the increasing calls for attacks on miners and settlers, Chief Aeneas chose to give up his leadership and took his family east into the Okanogan Highlands in 1863, settling in the valley. For about 25 years he claimed the full 15 mi (24 km) long stretch as his ranch which he used to raise cattle, horses, and oats. With new settlement laws however, the ranch size was reduced to parcel of 160 acres (650,000 m^{2}) on which Aeneas lived until his death in 1905.

=== Spelling and pronunciation ===
A number of geographic features, including creeks, a lake, a mountain, and the unincorporated community in Okanogan County were named for the Syilx leader. Two variant spelling were in use at the time, Aeneas and Eneas, and a decision was made by the United States Board on Geographic Names and released in December 1903 regarding the approved spelling. The commission decided that the former, Aeneas, was the recognized spelling, with Eneas to be discontinued. The spelling of the valley name has led to perennial mispronunciations of the name. According to Rose Isler, owner of the Aeneas Valley General Store, most visitors do not pronounce the name correctly, with the most frequent variant name being "Anus Valley", while residents of the region use the pronunciation "EE-knee-iss".

== Access ==
The main access though the valley is via County road 64, Aeneas Valley Road, which runs along the valley bottom from State Route 20 southeast to where it changes West Fork Sanpoil Road and then connects with State Route 21. In the 1920s this road was called Okanogan County Permanent Highway Number 22. In April 1927 the Okanogan County Commissioners requested survey work and plan submissions for improvement of the road, which were then approved in September. The improvements, following Washington state ordinances, laid out a straighter route with decreased gradients several sections requiring the seizure of several private plots of land through court proceedings.

A worker from the Tonasket Indian agency sawmill arrived in Spokane in the fall of 1891 reporting a potential railroad pass route to the Okanogan. Lew Wilmott travelled southeast via Bonaparte Creek, then through the Aeneas Valley and over the "San Puell Pass" into the Sanpoil River valley. The route was considered lower and easier than other passes being explored in the region at that time. In 1909 surveying for the proposed Great Northern lines included the Aeneas Valley as a potential route between Republic and the Okanogan Valley, with mineral prospecting in the valley raising the possibility of ore shipments on the future rail line. One initial plan was to build a branch line from the Sanpoil River Valley upstream along the West Fork Sanpoil River into the Aeneas Valley and then on to the Okanogan Valley. The branch was to join the Washington & Great Northern Railway right of way, however the route through the Sanpoil Valley was already in litigation, being contested by the local Spokane and British Columbia Railway. Despite winning the rights to the Sanpoil River right of way in a 1911 U.S. Supreme Court case, Great Northern decided to abandon the section fully in 1913. A Great Northern rail line eventually was put in from Oroville, Washington down the Okanogan River instead. As of 2025, public transit service is offered by TranGO, the Okanogan County Transit Authority, between Tonasket and Aeneas Valley on weekdays. The route has five trips per day, with stops at the Aeneas Valley Road and Route 20 junction and at the Aeneas Valley Store.

=== Communications ===
As of 2024, the Aeneas Valley does not have any cellular network coverage. The valley's overall topography makes radio transmission, reception, and communication spotty in most cases. Emergency contact with valley residents is available from the Okanogan County Emergency Alerts System via Everbridge, which allows for registered accounts to add up to 5 notification locations. The system also allows for emergency and important notifications to be sent on television and radio networks.

== Population ==
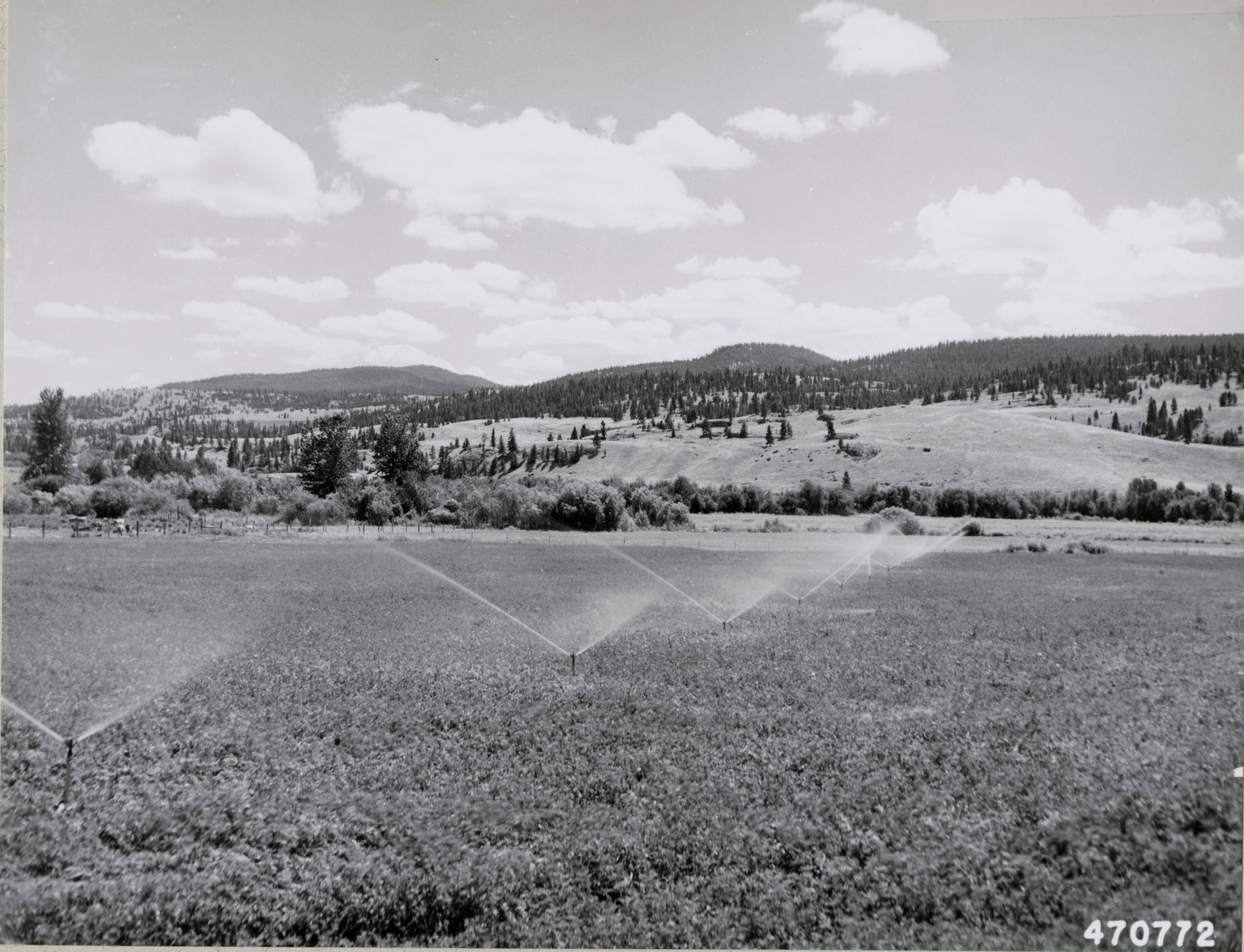
1952 alfalfa field

Soon after the opening of the northern half of the Colville Reservation in 1896, white settlers started to move into the valley. By 1901 mine prospecting was being conducted by the Aeneas Valley Mining Company, who were taking ore loads northeast to Republic for assaying and sale. A 22 ft (6.7 m) deep shaft on one prospect produced 50 lb (23 kg) of pyrite and "copper glace" from a vein about 2.5 ft (0.76 m) ledge. On another prospect, near the Ignace mine, a 10 ft (3.0 m) crosscut produced silver and lead ores that assayed in the Republic offices as gold/silver/lead ore of about $12.10 (equivalent to about $468.27 in 2025) per ton.

In the early 1900s groups of settlers from across the nation were attracted to settle the area. In 1908 a group of 20 Killbourn, Wisconsin men arrived in Republic, Washington via Pullman car intent on claiming land and settling in the valley. The group was preceded by livestock of cattle and horses on an earlier train, while families and home goods were to follow. The group was going to set up a settlement in a pre-platted area of the valley and build a dairy, lumber mill, and farms. The farming operations would be focused on orchards and poultry. Only H. B. Russell, leading the group, had been west before, and was the only one to have visited Aeneas Valley and the townsite.

The unincorporated community of Aeneas is located near the southeastern end of the valley on the north side of the West Fork Sanpoil Creek, and is the easternmost unincorporated community in the county. By 1908 the population in the greater vicinity of Aeneas was approximately 200 people on scattered farms located between .5 mi (0.80 km) and 12 mi (19 km) of the community core. With the closest post offices located at Anglin some 18 mi (29 km) north northwest of Aeneas and Wauconda 16 mi (26 km) north, a proposal for the establishment of a post office location in Aeneas was created. It was submitted on March 26, 1908, to the Post Office Departement's Office of the Assistant Postmaster General which oversaw location candidates and officerly received by the office on April 21, 1908. While the nearest already established mail route was a star route running between Tonasket and Anglin, the closest railroad access was the Washington & Great Northern depot in Republic, Washington 32 mi (51 km) to the northeast in Ferry County. As such, Republic was deemed the best suited location from which the mail service would be based. The route mapped out travelled south from Republic along the Sanpoil River to West Fork, and then northwest up the West Fork Sanpoil River and then northwest along the river to Aeneas. By 1913 the route was in use, listed as number 71206, being a delivery to a "special office", though mail was not always delivered daily, and valley residents were petitioning for daily service from Tonasket. While the nearest railroad access was still in Republic, it was the most distant of post offices in the vicinity, while rail service was being built down the Okanogan River valley from Loomis at the same time. With completion of both the Great Northern mainline along the Okanogan Valley and state route 4, the mail delivery into Aeneas by 1940 had been changed to a star route delivered from Tonasket, with service from Republic discontinued. The office was officially decommissioned sometime in 1974. Modern population growth in the valley is some of the highest inn Okanogan County, though the primary growth is from people of retirement age moving into the valley.

By 1913, Aeneas Valley had its own baseball club which played against other clubs of the region,. During the period of around 1916, church service was sporadic, with one pastor occasionally visiting the area from his home in Tonasket. The Aeneas Valley Club visited Republic for a July 4 tournament on the fair grounds. The tournament of five teams, Aeneas Valley, Grand Forks, Karamin, Republic, and Wauconda competed for a grand prize of $175 (equivalent to about $5,625 in 2025). By the late 1940s the original Aeneas Valley School District had been combined with the surrounding small districts of Beeman, Havillah, Loomis, Tonasket, and Wauconda. The new district became Tonasket District No. 404.

Electrification of the Aeneas Valley was approved by the U.S. federal Rural Electrification Administration in the spring of 1952. Notice was sent to the Ferry County Public Utility District who announced they would start power line construction the week of June 23, 1952. By November 12, 1952, a 69 mi (111 km) section of 79kv power lines had been erected from the Ferry County PUD lines west into the Tunk Creek Valley via Aeneas Valley at a cost of $200,000. A 42 mi (68 km) majority of the section was powered up on 12 November, with the remaining Tunk Creek spur to be turned on in the coming days granting electricity to a total of approximately 75 households.

In the late 1970s, an Okanogan County task force of Brewster and Omak police, the Okanogan County Sheriff, and county wildlife agents was formed to investigate possible marijuana grow operations in the county. On August 31, 1978, it was reported that raids had been conducted on three properties in Aeneas Valley leading to arrests, warrants, and seizure of goods. Around 500 lb (230 kg) of growing and cut cannabis was taken in along with paraphernalia.

== Businesses ==
To the northwest of Aeneas is the Aeneas store and Not Doug's Country Kitchen and Espresso. The store, also called the Aeneas General store or Aeneas Country store, is suggested to have first opened in 1982, but this is not known for certain. During the 2015 Okanogan Complex fires the store ran out of supplies within a few days of firefighters being stationed in the valley. It was bought by new owners in 2019 and supplies food, gas, souvenirs as the only general store store in the valley.

== 2026 plane crash ==
On October 10, 2026 a Piper Cub personal airplane traveling from Penticton, British Columbia to Grangeville, Idaho crashed in the valley, killing both pilot and passenger. While in flight the plane lost contact with the Seattle Air Route Traffic Control Center in the greater U.S. Route 97 near Okanogan, Washington. The Washington State Department of Transportation initiated a reagion wide search for the plane between Oroville and Okanogan, requesting aid from the Colville Confederated Tribes in assisting in ground search resources. The crash site was located in the afternoon of October 11, with family being notified soon after. The crash cause was not known at that time.

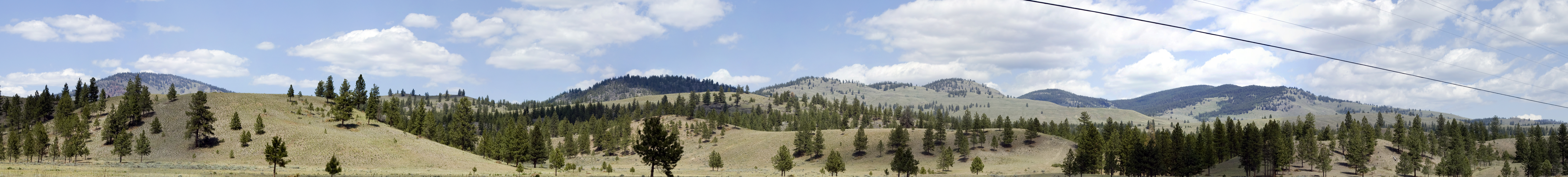
Panoramic of the hills east of Aeneas Valley
