= TranGO =

Bus transit agency in Okanogan County, Washington, US

- Commenced operation: July 1, 2015
- Headquarters: 303 2nd Avenue; Okanogan, Washington
- Locale: Okanogan County, Washington
- Service type: Bus, paratransit, vanpool
- Routes: 7
- Fleet: 24 buses
- Chief executive: Brent Timm
- Website: okanogantransit.com

TranGO, also known as the Okanogan County Transit Authority (OCTA), is a public transit agency that provides bus service in Okanogan County, Washington, United States. It has nine routes throughout the county that run six days a week from Monday to Saturday. The agency is funded by a sales tax within its service area and began service in 2015.

== History ==
The Okanogan County Transit Authority is a public transportation benefit area that was formed by the Okanogan County government and local leaders to provide a formal transit system for the largely rural region. The county had been served by Okanogan County Transportation and Nutrition, a social nonprofit that primarily focused on senior services, but its buses lacked daily service. The transit plan was approved by voters on November 5, 2013. TranGO was adopted as the system's brand name and began operation on its three routes serving the cities of Omak and Okanogan with a month of free service on July 1, 2015. It is funded by 0.4% sales tax applied within the public transportation benefit area, which accounted for $175,000 in monthly revenue in its first year.

TranGO ridership grew steadily in its first years of service, with an annual increase of 10,000 trips each year until the onset of the COVID-19 pandemic in early 2020. The system switched to a reservation-only system from April 2020 to May 2020 to comply with the state government's requirements on social distancing, and resumed its full service on May 17, 2021. TranGO expanded to Aeneas Valley, Conconully, and Mazama in 2023. Ridership returned to pre-pandemic levels in 2025.

== Service ==
As of 2026, TranGO has seven routes serving communities in Okanogan County that converge on three central hubs in Okanogan, Tonasket, and Twisp. The fixed route services run on weekdays and Saturdays from 6 a.m. to 7:30 p.m. with headways that range from 30 minutes to 3 hours. A fare of $1 is collected from passengers over the age of 18. An intercity route to Chelan was launched in September 2024 to provide connections with Link Transit. The system also connects with the Apple Line, a Travel Washington intercity route funded by the Washington State Department of Transportation. The agency also contracts with Okanogan County Transportation and Nutrition to provide service from Okanogan and Omak to the Colville Indian Reservation and Coulee Dam.

In 2025, TranGO carried a total of 62,675 passengers on its fixed route buses.

== Fleet ==
As of 2023, TranGO operates a fleet of 24 vehicles in revenue service that are all gasoline-powered. The fleet comprises 10 cutaway minibuses for fixed route service, 6 cargo vans for paratransit, and 8 other passenger vans for vanpool and other uses. The agency plans to transition to a zero-emissions fleet by 2034 using battery electric and hydrogen fuel cell buses.
