= Havillah, Washington =

Unincorporated community in Washington, US

Havillah
- Unincorporated community
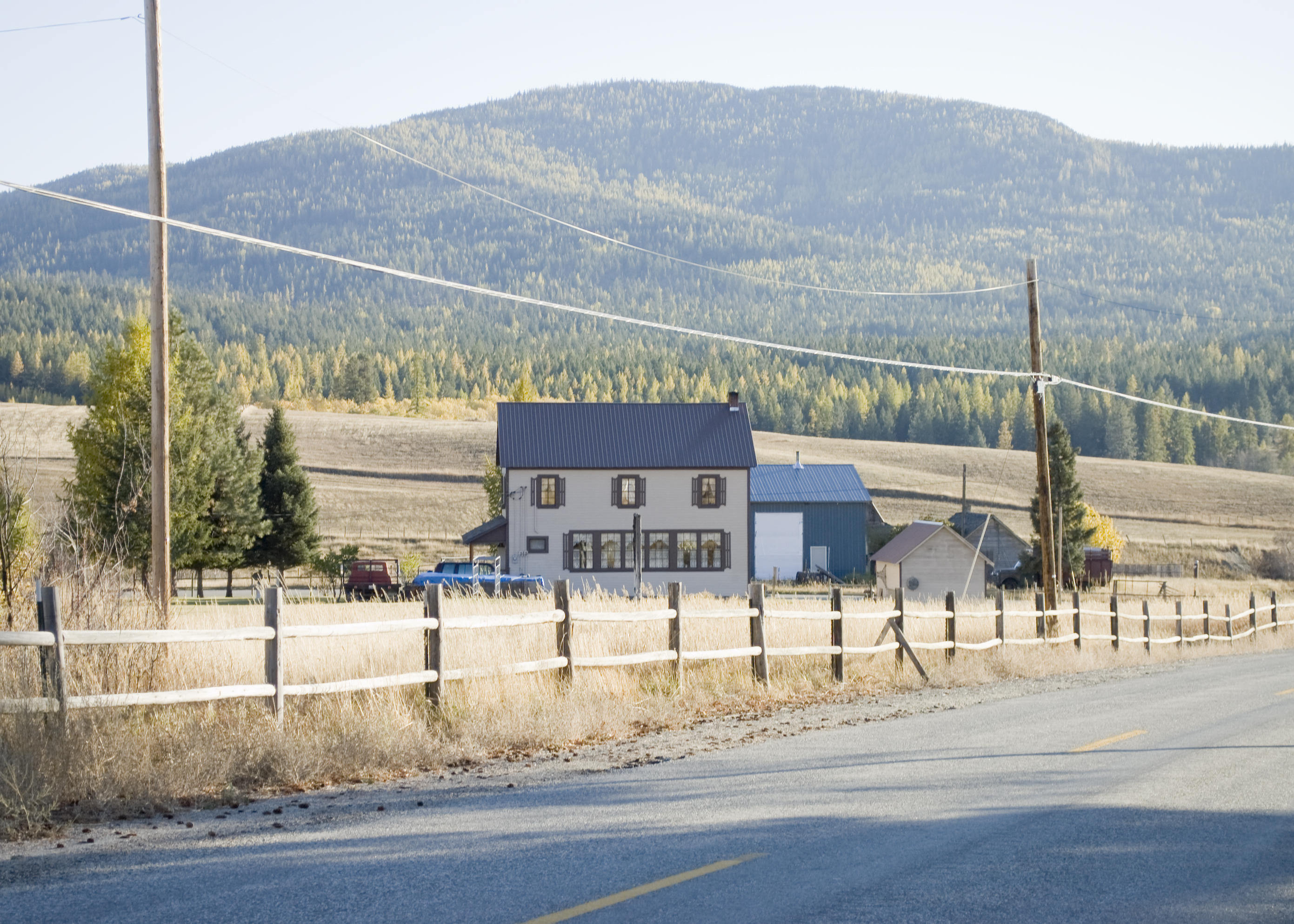
- Old schoolhouse in Havillah

- Location within Washington (state)
- Coordinates: 48°49′41″N 119°12′15″W
- Country: United States
- State: Washington
- County: Okanogan
- Homesteaded: early 1900s
- Elevation: 3,507 ft (1,069 m)
- Time zone: UTC-8 (Pacific (PST))
  - Summer (DST): UTC-7 (PDT)
- GNIS feature ID: 1520610

Havillah is a small unincorporated community located in northeastern Okanogan County, Washington, eighteen miles south of the Canada–US border. Current census searches do not indicate a population count, but estimates are three to four hundred in the immediate and surrounding areas.

== History ==
The area was homesteaded and settled in the early 1900s. Many of the families came from the midwest, and several direct descendants (notably the Schweikert/Kalmas, Duchows, Obergs, Bunches, and Vissers) still live there and farm the land.

At 3500 feet, the climate is considered semi-arid and farming efforts are seasonal due to the cold and snow. Cattle and some sheep are raised, in addition to wheat, oats, barley, and alfalfa hay. Most crops must rely on snowfall and seasonal rains for dry land farming. Many residents who farm or raise livestock in Havillah supplement their income with jobs in the nearest towns of Tonasket or Oroville about twenty miles "down the hill".

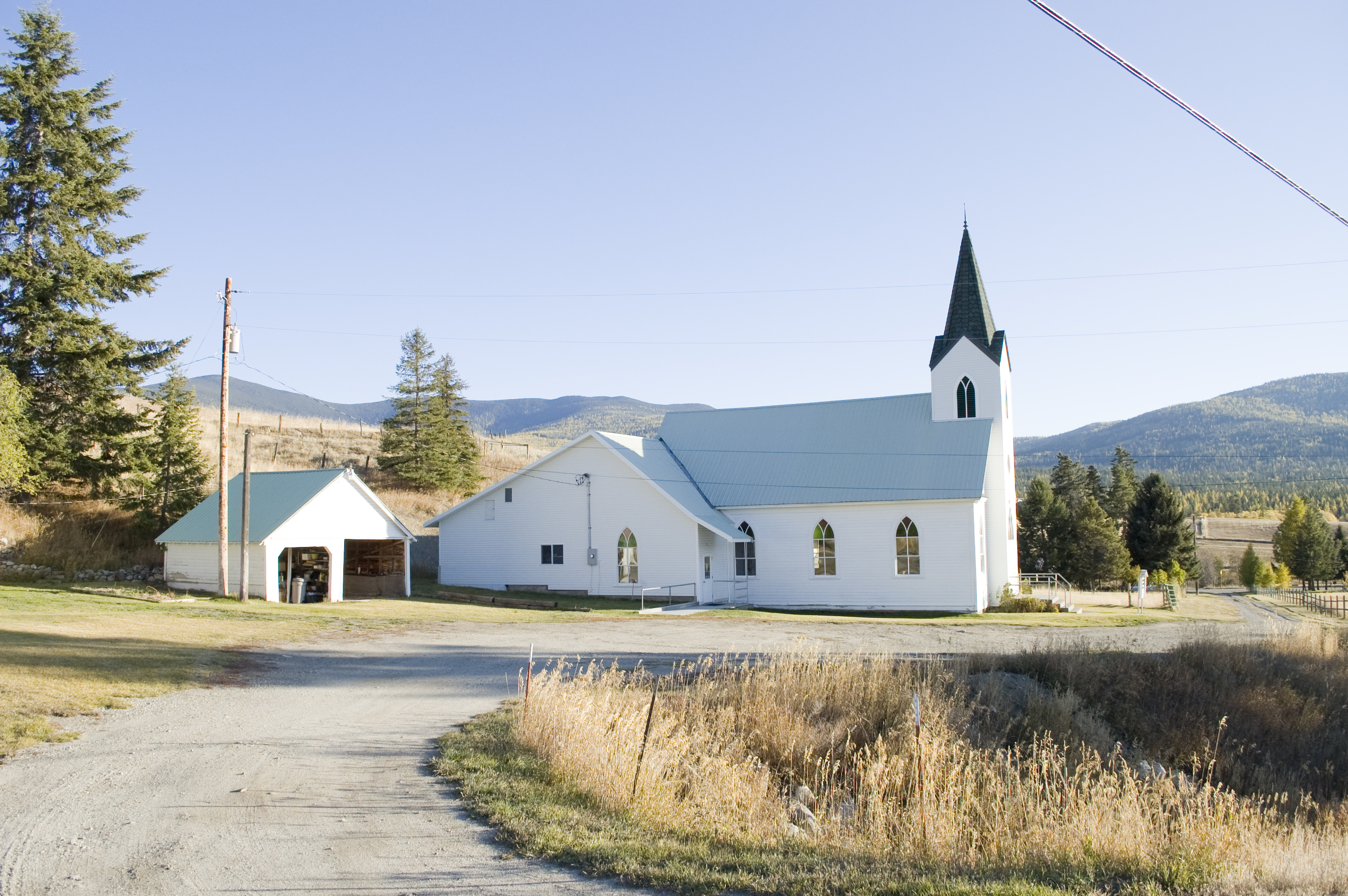
Lutheran Church in Havillah, Washington

Immanuel Lutheran Congregation (organized January 29, 1905) serves as the community hub, and members and non-members alike attend weekly services and other functions there. Up the road, Sitzmark Ski Hill has been a favorite winter recreation area for local folks since it was established by the Schweikert and Dukow family in the mid 1900s. In addition, hunting, hiking, other winter sports, boating, and fishing opportunities have long been the mainstay of recreation in the general area which borders the Okanogan–Wenatchee National Forest and the nearby Pasayten Wilderness.
