= Okanagan Basin Water Board =

Water governance body in British Columbia, Canada

The Okanagan Basin Water Board (OBWB) is a water governance body designated to identify and resolve critical water issues for the Okanagan watershed in British Columbia, Canada. It was set up to implement the recommendations of the Okanagan Basin Study, and to take on a range of responsibilities for water management. The OBWB’s jurisdiction is defined by the geographic borders of the Okanagan Basin rather than political boundaries.

== Overview ==
Water is one of the most precious and important natural assets in the Okanagan Basin. Even though the Basin is endowed with several large lakes, the supply of clean, reliable water is inherently limited by the semi-arid to arid climate, which brings minimal precipitation and high evaporation and evapotranspiration rates. In fact, according to Statistics Canada the Okanagan Basin has the lowest per capita availability of fresh water in Canada. Water shortages have already occurred in some areas of the Basin, and are expected to occur more widely and frequently in the future.

== Powers ==
The OBWB does not have regulatory authority, but has taxation powers to support its activities, there is only one other example of this in the province- The Municipal Finance Authority. The OBWB operates primarily as regional service delivery body focusing on incentive-based programs, which provide support in different ways for projects promoting good water management. As the OBWB assesses funds from all Basin residents, initiatives are focused on activities that have valley-wide benefits. Nine of the twelve Directors are elected officials appointed by the three Okanagan regional districts, and (since 2006) the Okanagan Nation Alliance, the Water Supply Association of BC, and the Okanagan Water Stewardship Council each appoint an additional Director.

At the time of the OBWB’s inception, algal blooms and other signs of deteriorating lake water quality and the explosive invasion of Eurasian watermilfoil (Myriophyllum spicatum) were the most serious water issues in the Basin. For many years the OBWB’s activities focused almost exclusively on these areas, bringing significant improvements to water quality and the aesthetics of Okanagan beaches. Several factors over the past thirty years, including rapid population growth, increased awareness of climate change, and the forest fires and drout, reinforced calls to refresh the OBWB’s mandate. In 2006, the OBWB took on a new Water Management Initiative and a more active leadership role in the valley.

The new Water Management Initiative brought the OBWB closer to its original mandate from 1969-1970. The OBWB’s purpose is now stated as: “Providing leadership to protect and enhance quality of life in the Okanagan Basin through sustainable water resource management”.

== Functions ==
- Implementing Basin-wide programs for watermilfoil control, wastewater infrastructure funding, and water research and management to benefit all Basin residents;
- Advocating and representing local needs to senior government planners and policy makers to protect Okanagan interests;
- Providing science-based information on Okanagan water to local government decision makers and water managers for sustainable long-term planning;
- Communicating and coordinating between government, non-government, universities and businesses to increase the effectiveness of water initiatives; and
- Building funding opportunities by providing leverage grants, securing external dollars and identifying cost-sharing partners to expand local capacity.

Over the period of this initiative, OBWB has been increasingly effective at promoting best practices and improving communication between jurisdictions. The OBWB has also had great success partnering with provincial agencies – especially in support of regional water science and monitoring.
