= Wauconda, Washington =

Unincorporated community in Washington, United States

- Unincorporated community
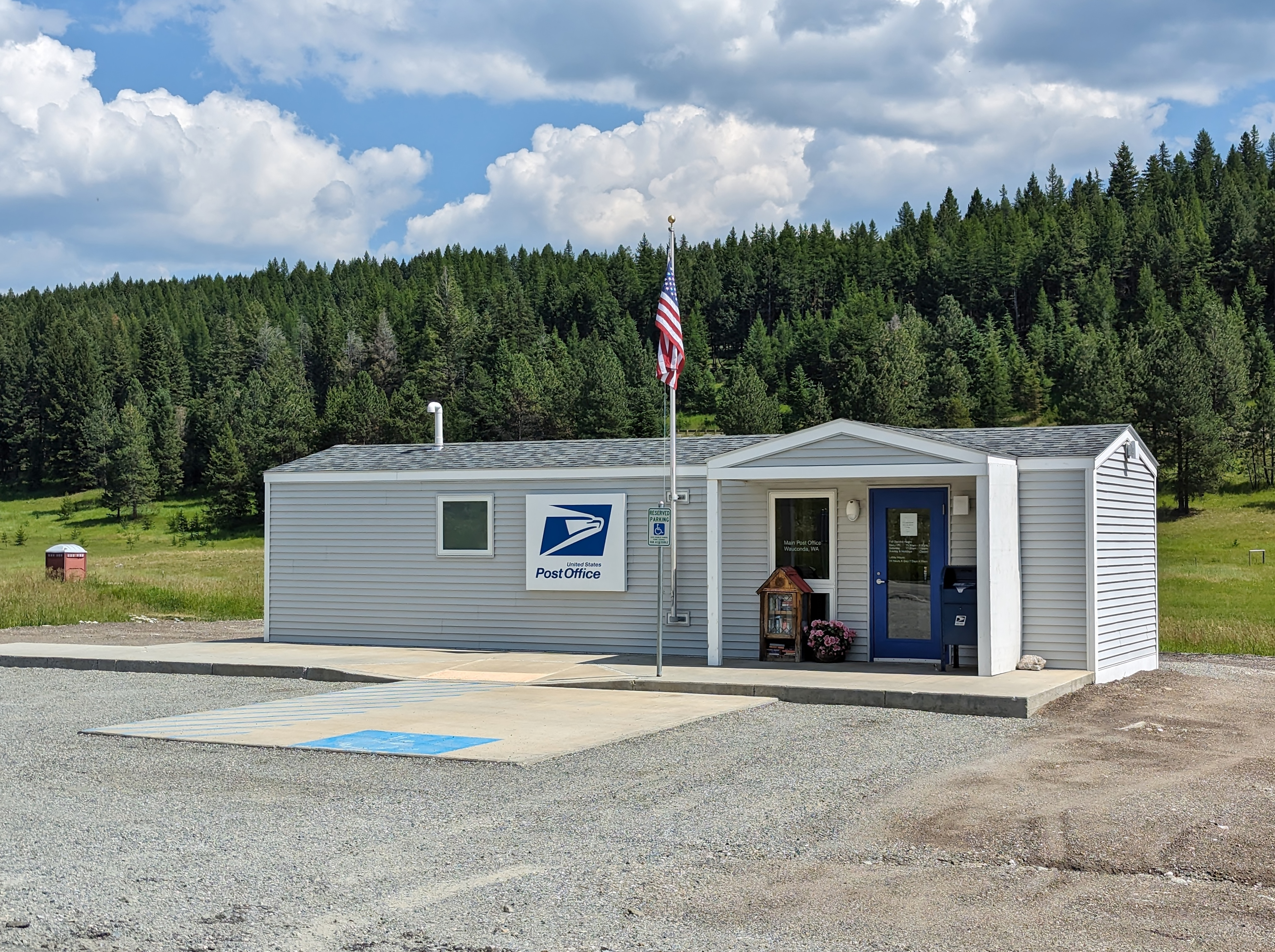
- The post office in Wauconda

- Location within Washington (state) Location within the United States
- Coordinates: 48°43′33″N 119°00′49″W
- Country: United States
- State: Washington
- County: Okanogan
- Founded: 1898
- Elevation: 3,576 ft (1,090 m)

Population (2000)
  - Total: 226
  - Density: 1.8/sq mi (0.69/km^{2})
- Time zone: UTC-8 (Pacific (PST))
  - Summer (DST): UTC-7 (PDT)
- ZIP code: 98859
- Area code: 509
- GNIS feature ID: 1527856

Wauconda is a small unincorporated community in Okanogan County, Washington, United States. Once a boom town, it has dwindled almost to nothing; it is now under single ownership.

== History ==
Wauconda was founded in 1898 as a mining community. Three brothers from Wauconda, Illinois, discovered gold in the area and decided to name the mine after their hometown. Four mines, the Oregonian Mine and three Wauconda Mines, eventually operated in the area, quickly swelling the area's population to over 300. By 1900 the town had a general store, and by 1901 it had a post office, although the location was two miles west of the original camp. At its peak there were about 1,000 residents.

In the early 1900s the output of the mines declined and they were eventually closed. In 1929, the state built Highway 20 on a route that bypassed the town, so the town was relocated to be on the new road. The abandoned former town location is now a ghost town.

Present-day Wauconda is much smaller than the old mining boomtown. Its small commercial district has a post office, gas station, general store, and restaurant, all with a single private owner. In 2008, owner Daphne Fletcher placed the town's commercial properties, along with a residence, up for sale with an asking price of $1,125,000. In March 2010, Fletcher put the combined properties for sale on eBay, promoting the sale as a "town for auction". A couple from Healesville, Victoria, in Australia, won the auction with a purchase price of $370,601, but failed to complete the transaction due to financial and health concerns. Two weeks later, the town was sold to a couple, Neal and Maddie Love, from Bothell, Washington, for $360,000. However, when Neal Love found steady employment in North Dakota, the couple closed the store in June 2015.

== Geography ==
Wauconda is located on a plateau about 23 miles (37 km) east of Tonasket, Washington, near Wauconda Pass and the Okanogan–Wenatchee National Forest. State Route 20 travels through the settlement. It is near the headwaters of a fork of Granite Creek, which empties into the Sanpoil River at nearby Republic, Washington.
