= Okanogan River =

River in North America, tributary of the Columbia River

Okanogan River Okanagan River
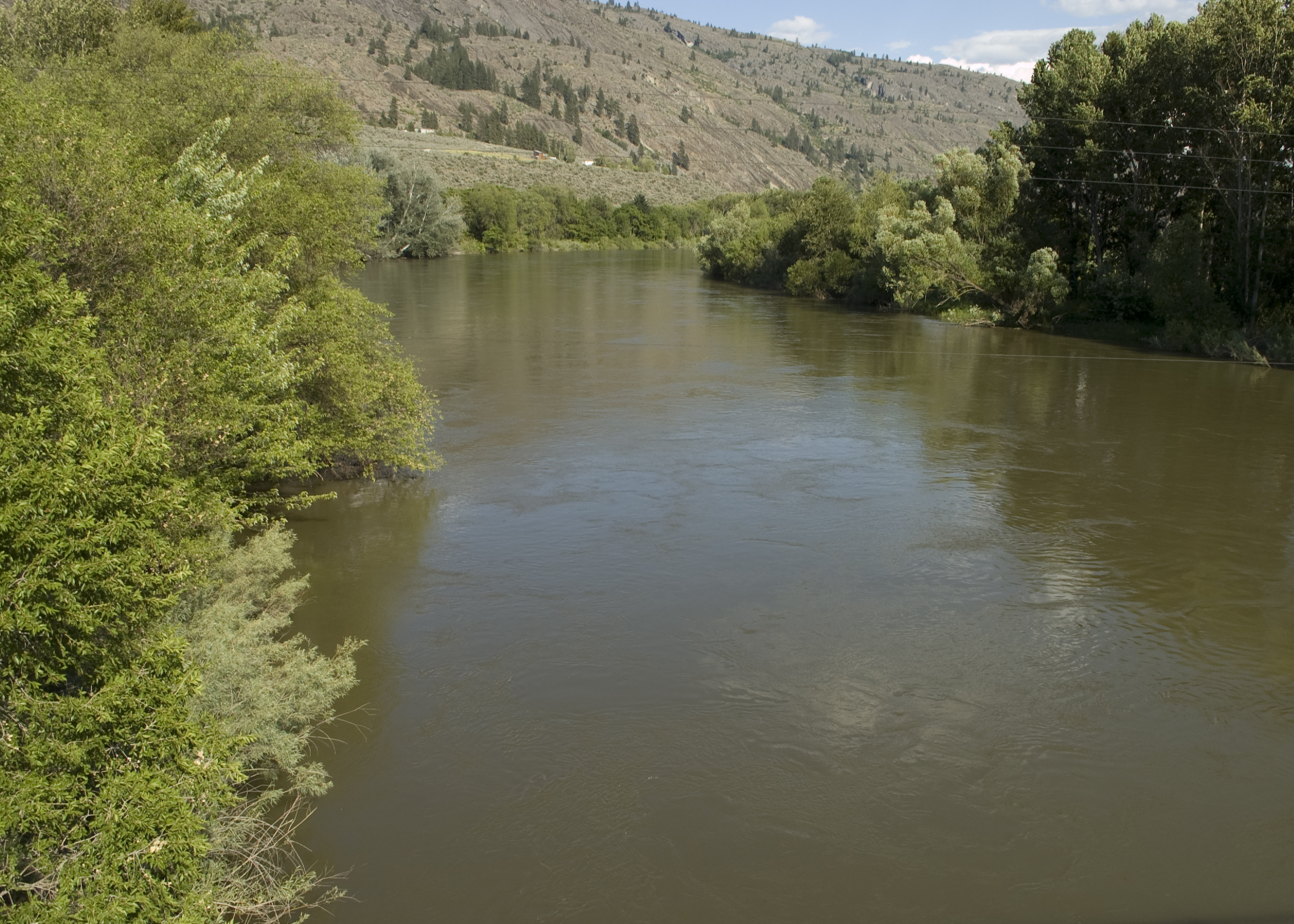

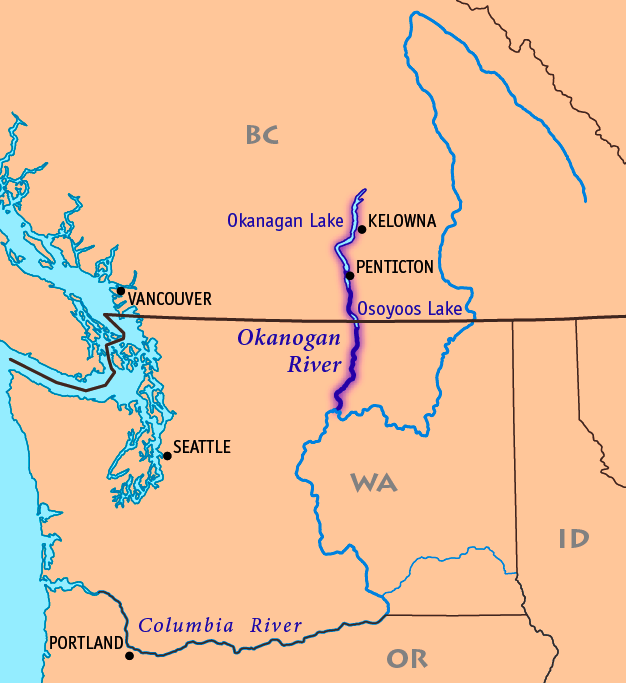
- Map of the Okanogan River, tributary of the Columbia River

Location
- Countries: Canada; United States
- State: Washington
- Province: British Columbia
- Cities: Penticton, BC; Omak, WA

Physical characteristics
- Source: Okanagan Lake
  - location: Penticton, British Columbia, Canada
  - coordinates: 49°30′13″N 119°36′42″W
  - elevation: 1,122 ft (342 m)
- Mouth: Columbia River
  - location: Brewster, Washington, United States
  - coordinates: 48°5′54″N 119°44′3″W
  - elevation: 781 ft (238 m)
- Length: 115 mi (185 km)
- Basin size: 8,200 sq mi (21,000 km^{2})
- Discharge
  - location: Malott, WA
  - average: 3,039 cu ft/s (86.1 m^{3}/s)
  - minimum: 288 cu ft/s (8.2 m^{3}/s)
  - maximum: 45,600 cu ft/s (1,290 m^{3}/s)

Basin features
- Tributaries
  - right: Similkameen River

The Okanogan River (known as the Okanagan River in Canada) is a tributary of the Columbia River, approximately 115 mi (185 km) long, in southern British Columbia and north central Washington. It drains a scenic plateau region called the Okanagan Country east of the Cascade Range and north and west of the Columbia, and also the Okanagan region of British Columbia. The Canadian portion of the river has been channelized since the mid-1950s.

== Course ==
The Okanagan River rises in southern British Columbia, issuing out of the southern end of Okanagan Lake, which is on the north side of the city of Penticton. It flows south past Penticton, through Skaha Lake, past Okanagan Falls, through Vaseux Lake, and past Oliver to Osoyoos and Osoyoos Lake, which spans the Canada–United States border and has its outlet into the Okanogan River at Oroville, on the southern shore of the lake, in Okanogan County. At the border the river's name (and the region and also the name of the Okanagan Highland) changes spelling from Okanagan to Okanogan. Average annual flow of the river at this point is 643 cfs (18.2 m³/s).

From Oroville the Okanogan River flows south through the Okanogan County, past Okanogan and Omak. It forms the western boundary of the Colville Indian Reservation. The Okanogan River enters the Columbia River from the north, 5 miles (8 km) east of Brewster, between the Wells Dam (downstream) and the Chief Joseph Dam (upstream). The reservoir behind Wells Dam, into which the Okanogan empties, is called Lake Pateros.

== Tributaries ==
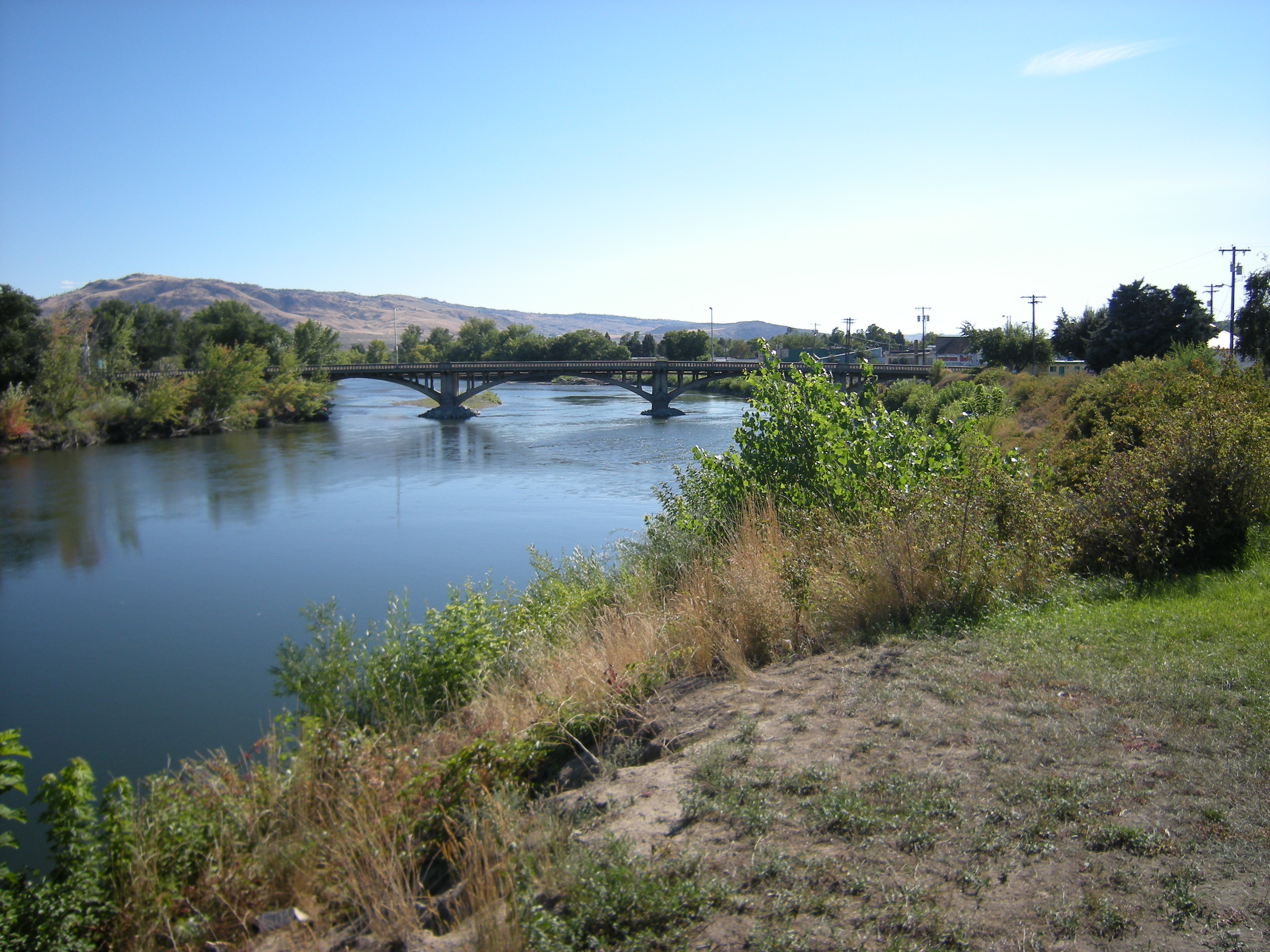
The river at Omak, Washington

The Okanogan River receives the Similkameen River from the west near Oroville. It receives Omak Creek from the east near Omak, Tonasket Creek from the east near Oroville and Bonaparte Creek at Tonasket which flows from Bonaparte Lake near Wauconda and also from Aeneas Valley west of the Sanpoil. It occasionally receives water from Salmon Creek at the town of Okanogan but much of the year this water is diverted for irrigation.

== History ==
The river takes its name from the Okanagan (or Syilx) placename [uk^{w}naqín]. The name Okanagan was subsequently applied to the Syilx people themselves. Early maps of the fur trade era show the Okanagan River as the "Caledonia River", a name conferred as it was the connecting route between the Columbia District and the New Caledonia Fur District (which began north of Okanagan Lake).

Fort Okanogan, a fur-trading post opened by the Pacific Fur Company (PFC) late in 1811, was located at the river's confluence with the Columbia. The isolation and pressures caused by the War of 1812 forced the PFC to sell its property and assets to its Canadian rivals, the North West Company. The NWC was in turn merged into the Hudson's Bay Company in 1821, the latter company maintaining a presence at Fort Okanogan until the 1850s.

During the Fraser Canyon Gold Rush of 1858–1859, parties of armed miners, often at conflict with native peoples in the region, traveled the Okanagan Trail and its western branch, the Similkameen Trail, via the river. After hostilities subsided, the route continued to be important as the southern leg of the overland trail to the Cariboo Gold Rush known then by its fur trade era name as the Brigade Trail.

== See also ==
- List of rivers of British Columbia
- List of rivers of Washington (state)
- Okanagan Basin Water Board
