= Tonasket, Washington =

Tonasket
- City
- Tonasket, Washington
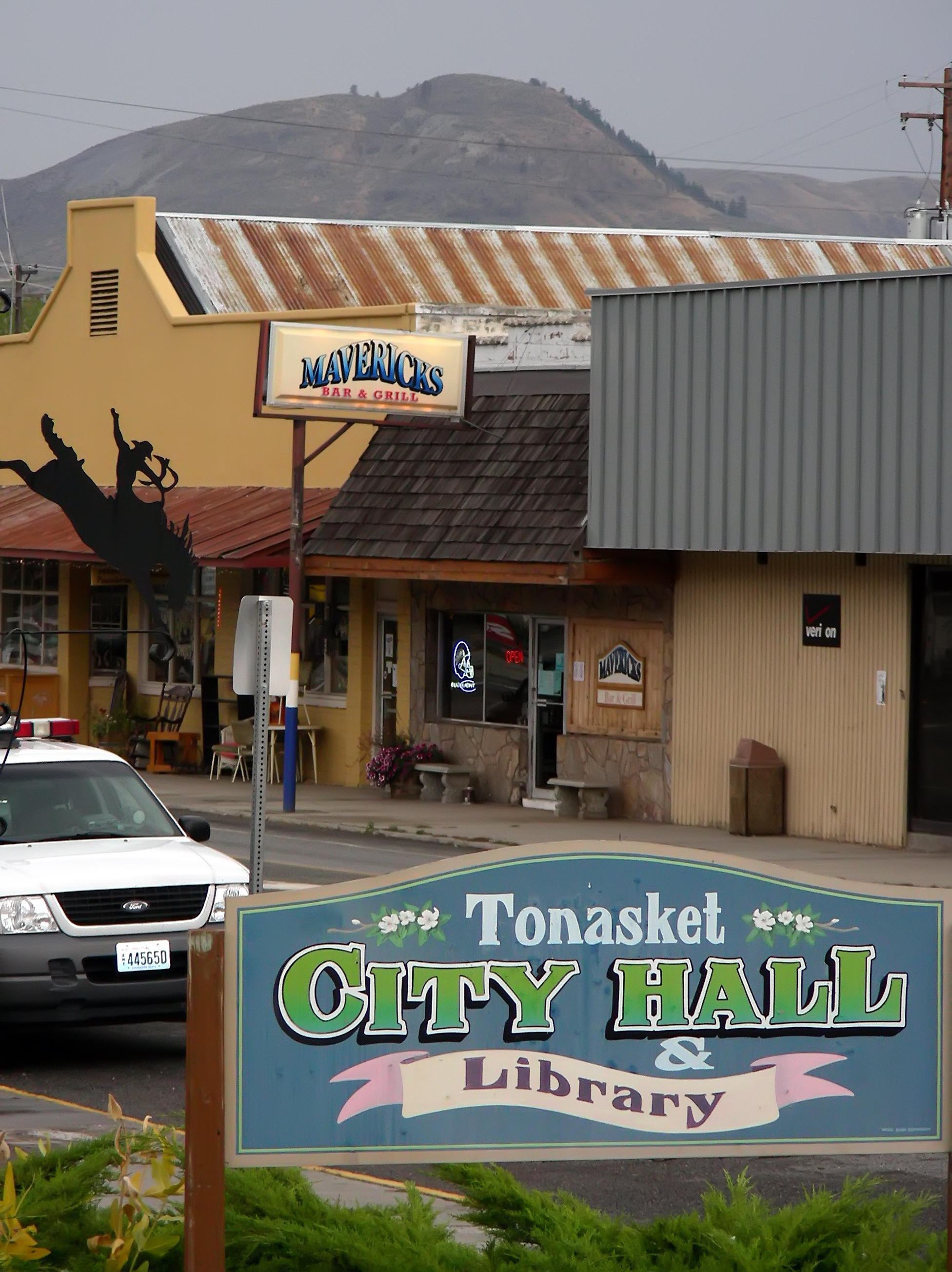
- Tonasket in 2008

- Location of Tonasket, Washington
- Coordinates: 48°42′28″N 119°26′29″W
- Country: United States
- State: Washington
- County: Okanogan

Government
  - Mayor: Alisa Weddle

Area
  - Total: 0.96 sq mi (2.49 km^{2})
  - Land: 0.94 sq mi (2.44 km^{2})
  - Water: 0.019 sq mi (0.05 km^{2})
- Elevation: 899 ft (274 m)

Population (2020)
  - Total: 1,103
  - Density: 1,170/sq mi (452/km^{2})
- Time zone: UTC-8 (Pacific (PST))
  - Summer (DST): UTC-7 (PDT)
- ZIP code: 98855
- Area code: 509
- FIPS code: 53-71890
- GNIS feature ID: 2412082
- Website: City of Tonasket

Tonasket /təˈnæskət/ is a city in Okanogan County, Washington, United States. The population was 1,103 at the 2020 census.

== History ==
Tonasket was officially incorporated on December 16, 1927. It is named after Chief Tonasket of the Okanogan people, a local leader from this area who assumed the status of grand chief of the American Okanogan after the drawing of the Canada–United States border by the Oregon Treaty of 1846, assuming a leadership role in Okanogan territory formerly held by Chief Nicola who lived north of the border.

Tonasket is a city located along the eastern bank of the Okanogan River in north-central Okanogan County, Washington. U.S. Highway 97, the main north–south highway through central Washington, bisects the city on its way north to the Canada–US border approximately twenty miles away. Washington State Route 20 turns east of 97 at 6th St, and continues running across the state. The city is bordered on the north by Siwash Creek, on the south by Bonaparte Creek, and on the west by the Okanogan River.

Tonasket, which has been the site of a U.S. post office since 1901, was platted in 1910 and incorporated in 1927. It serves as a hub for agricultural and forestry industries in north central Okanogan County. It is the location of three major fruit storage and processing facilities and the offices of the Tonasket Ranger District of the Colville National Forest.

Many descendants of pioneer families still reside in Tonasket and the surrounding areas and are interested in preserving and sharing the history of their heritage. A son of one of those pioneer families, Walter H. Brattain, grew up on a cattle ranch near Tonasket, attended Tonasket schools and shared the 1956 Nobel Prize for Physics (with William Shockley and John Bardeen) for the invention of the transistor.

In 1973, Michael Pilarski of the Friends of the Trees Society organized a faire in Tonasket that sought to help community members provision and sell excess produce and goods before the winter months. This faire has become known as the Okanogan Family Barter Faire and attendees buy, sell, and trade art and handicrafts, vintage clothing, and homegrown produce and can learn about sustainable farming techniques and herbal remedies while enjoying live music and entertainment. The annual event draws in thousands of visitors from around the region and has been described as a celebration of sustainable living and communal ties.

== Geography ==
Tonasket is located along the Okanogan River at an altitude of 1,311 ft (400 m).

According to the United States Census Bureau, the city has a total area of 0.80 square miles (2.07 km^{2}), all of it land.

Tonasket Municipal Airport (W01) opened to the public in July 1990 with one paved runway of 3,053 ft (931 m) in length, situated 2 miles (3 km) northwest of town on 100 acres (40 ha) of land.

== Climate ==
Tonasket experiences a dry-summer continental climate (Köppen Dsa).

Climate data for Tonasket 11NE, Washington, 1991–2020 normals, 2012–2022 extremes: 3434ft (1047m)
Month	Jan	Feb	Mar	Apr	May	Jun	Jul	Aug	Sep	Oct	Nov	Dec	Year
Record high °F (°C)	48 (9)	49 (9)	60 (16)	75 (24)	86 (30)	103 (39)	99 (37)	96 (36)	89 (32)	76 (24)	58 (14)	60 (16)	103 (39)
Mean maximum °F (°C)	41.4 (5.2)	44.0 (6.7)	55.1 (12.8)	65.8 (18.8)	76.7 (24.8)	84.5 (29.2)	91.2 (32.9)	91.4 (33.0)	82.8 (28.2)	67.2 (19.6)	53.0 (11.7)	42.0 (5.6)	93.4 (34.1)
Mean daily maximum °F (°C)	28.8 (−1.8)	33.3 (0.7)	41.3 (5.2)	51.3 (10.7)	60.4 (15.8)	66.7 (19.3)	77.1 (25.1)	77.3 (25.2)	68.0 (20.0)	51.8 (11.0)	36.3 (2.4)	27.5 (−2.5)	51.7 (10.9)
Daily mean °F (°C)	22.6 (−5.2)	26.1 (−3.3)	33.4 (0.8)	41.9 (5.5)	50.5 (10.3)	56.4 (13.6)	64.7 (18.2)	64.7 (18.2)	55.9 (13.3)	42.4 (5.8)	30.4 (−0.9)	22.0 (−5.6)	42.6 (5.9)
Mean daily minimum °F (°C)	16.3 (−8.7)	18.9 (−7.3)	25.5 (−3.6)	32.4 (0.2)	40.5 (4.7)	46.1 (7.8)	52.3 (11.3)	52.0 (11.1)	43.7 (6.5)	33.1 (0.6)	24.5 (−4.2)	16.5 (−8.6)	33.5 (0.8)
Mean minimum °F (°C)	1.4 (−17.0)	2.5 (−16.4)	12.0 (−11.1)	22.6 (−5.2)	29.9 (−1.2)	35.4 (1.9)	42.5 (5.8)	43.2 (6.2)	33.6 (0.9)	22.9 (−5.1)	10.2 (−12.1)	−1.8 (−18.8)	−6.7 (−21.5)
Record low °F (°C)	−9 (−23)	−10 (−23)	−2 (−19)	15 (−9)	27 (−3)	30 (−1)	39 (4)	39 (4)	27 (−3)	11 (−12)	−6 (−21)	−22 (−30)	−22 (−30)
Average precipitation inches (mm)	1.73 (44)	1.41 (36)	1.40 (36)	1.23 (31)	2.14 (54)	2.23 (57)	0.82 (21)	0.55 (14)	0.72 (18)	1.17 (30)	1.87 (47)	2.22 (56)	17.49 (444)
Average snowfall inches (cm)	18.2 (46)	11.2 (28)	6.7 (17)	2.1 (5.3)	0.0 (0.0)	0.0 (0.0)	0.0 (0.0)	0.0 (0.0)	0.3 (0.76)	2.3 (5.8)	11.3 (29)	16.1 (41)	68.2 (172.86)
Source 1: NOAA
Source 2: XMACIS2 (records, 2012-2022 monthly max/mins & snowfall)

Climate data for Tonasket, Washington
Month	Jan	Feb	Mar	Apr	May	Jun	Jul	Aug	Sep	Oct	Nov	Dec	Year
Record high °F (°C)	59 (15)	63 (17)	76 (24)	96 (36)	98 (37)	102 (39)	109 (43)	106 (41)	101 (38)	86 (30)	70 (21)	67 (19)	109 (43)
Mean daily maximum °F (°C)	33 (1)	40 (4)	53 (12)	63 (17)	72 (22)	80 (27)	88 (31)	88 (31)	78 (26)	62 (17)	44 (7)	32 (0)	61 (16)
Mean daily minimum °F (°C)	21 (−6)	24 (−4)	31 (−1)	37 (3)	44 (7)	51 (11)	57 (14)	57 (14)	48 (9)	36 (2)	28 (−2)	20 (−7)	38 (3)
Record low °F (°C)	−22 (−30)	−26 (−32)	−7 (−22)	15 (−9)	19 (−7)	30 (−1)	35 (2)	34 (1)	20 (−7)	8 (−13)	−3 (−19)	−21 (−29)	−26 (−32)
Average precipitation inches (mm)	1.69 (43)	1.34 (34)	1.17 (30)	1.05 (27)	1.31 (33)	1.23 (31)	0.81 (21)	0.46 (12)	0.58 (15)	1.10 (28)	1.81 (46)	2.54 (65)	15.09 (385)

== Demographics ==
Historical population
Census	Pop.	Note	%±
1930	513		—
1940	643		25.3%
1950	957		48.8%
1960	958		0.1%
1970	951		−0.7%
1980	985		3.6%
1990	847		−14.0%
2000	994		17.4%
2010	1,032		3.8%
2020	1,103		6.9%
U.S. Decennial Census; 2020 Census

=== 2020 census ===
As of the 2020 census, Tonasket had a population of 1,103. The median age was 49.3 years. 21.6% of residents were under the age of 18 and 31.3% of residents were 65 years of age or older. For every 100 females there were 86.9 males, and for every 100 females age 18 and over there were 81.7 males.

There were 473 households in Tonasket, of which 26.6% had children under the age of 18 living in them. Of all households, 36.2% were married-couple households, 20.3% were households with a male householder and no spouse or partner present, and 38.3% were households with a female householder and no spouse or partner present. About 40.3% of all households were made up of individuals and 23.2% had someone living alone who was 65 years of age or older.

There were 520 housing units, of which 9.0% were vacant. The homeowner vacancy rate was 2.0% and the rental vacancy rate was 5.4%.

0.0% of residents lived in urban areas, while 100.0% lived in rural areas.

Racial composition as of the 2020 census
Race	Number	Percent
White	846	76.7%
Black or African American	3	0.3%
American Indian and Alaska Native	31	2.8%
Asian	5	0.5%
Native Hawaiian and Other Pacific Islander	3	0.3%
Some other race	110	10.0%
Two or more races	105	9.5%
Hispanic or Latino (of any race)	171	15.5%

=== 2010 census ===
As of the 2010 census, there were 1,032 people, 453 households, and 234 families living in the city. The population density was 1,290.0 inhabitants per square mile (498.1/km^{2}). There were 511 housing units at an average density of 638.8 per square mile (246.6/km^{2}). The racial makeup of the city was 81.9% White, 0.6% African American, 2.0% Native American, 1.0% Asian, 11.2% from other races, and 3.3% from two or more races. Hispanic or Latino of any race were 16.5% of the population.

There were 453 households, of which 24.3% had children under the age of 18 living with them, 33.6% were married couples living together, 12.4% had a female householder with no husband present, 5.7% had a male householder with no wife present, and 48.3% were non-families. 42.6% of all households were made up of individuals, and 25% had someone living alone who was 65 years of age or older. The average household size was 2.13 and the average family size was 2.90.

The median age in the city was 47.5 years. 19.3% of residents were under the age of 18; 9.8% were between the ages of 18 and 24; 17.7% were from 25 to 44; 27% were from 45 to 64; and 26.3% were 65 years of age or older. The gender makeup of the city was 47.9% male and 52.1% female.

=== 2000 census ===
As of the 2000 census, there were 994 people, 420 households, and 223 families living in the city. The population density was 1,544.7 people per square mile (599.7/km^{2}). There were 482 housing units at an average density of 749.0 per square mile (290.8/km^{2}). The racial makeup of the city was 88.03% White, 0.40% African American, 1.41% Native American, 0.70% Asian, 0.10% Pacific Islander, 7.75% from other races, and 1.61% from two or more races. Hispanic or Latino of any race were 10.16% of the population.

There were 420 households, out of which 26.9% had children under the age of 18 living with them, 37.6% were married couples living together, 11.4% had a female householder with no husband present, and 46.7% were non-families. 40.2% of all households were made up of individuals, and 21.9% had someone living alone who was 65 years of age or older. The average household size was 2.14 and the average family size was 2.89.

In the city, the population was spread out, with 22.7% under the age of 18, 6.4% from 18 to 24, 20.8% from 25 to 44, 23.0% from 45 to 64, and 27.0% who were 65 years of age or older. The median age was 45 years. For every 100 females, there were 80.4 males. For every 100 females age 18 and over, there were 78.6 males.

The median income for a household in the city was $23,523, and the median income for a family was $28,393. Males had a median income of $28,542 versus $22,250 for females. The per capita income for the city was $13,293. About 22.0% of families and 23.1% of the population were below the poverty line, including 26.7% of those under age 18 and 9.5% of those age 65 or over.

== Education ==
The city is served by the Tonasket School District.

== See also ==
- Okanagan people
