= Boulder–Deer Creek Pass =

Mountain pass in Washington state, U.S.

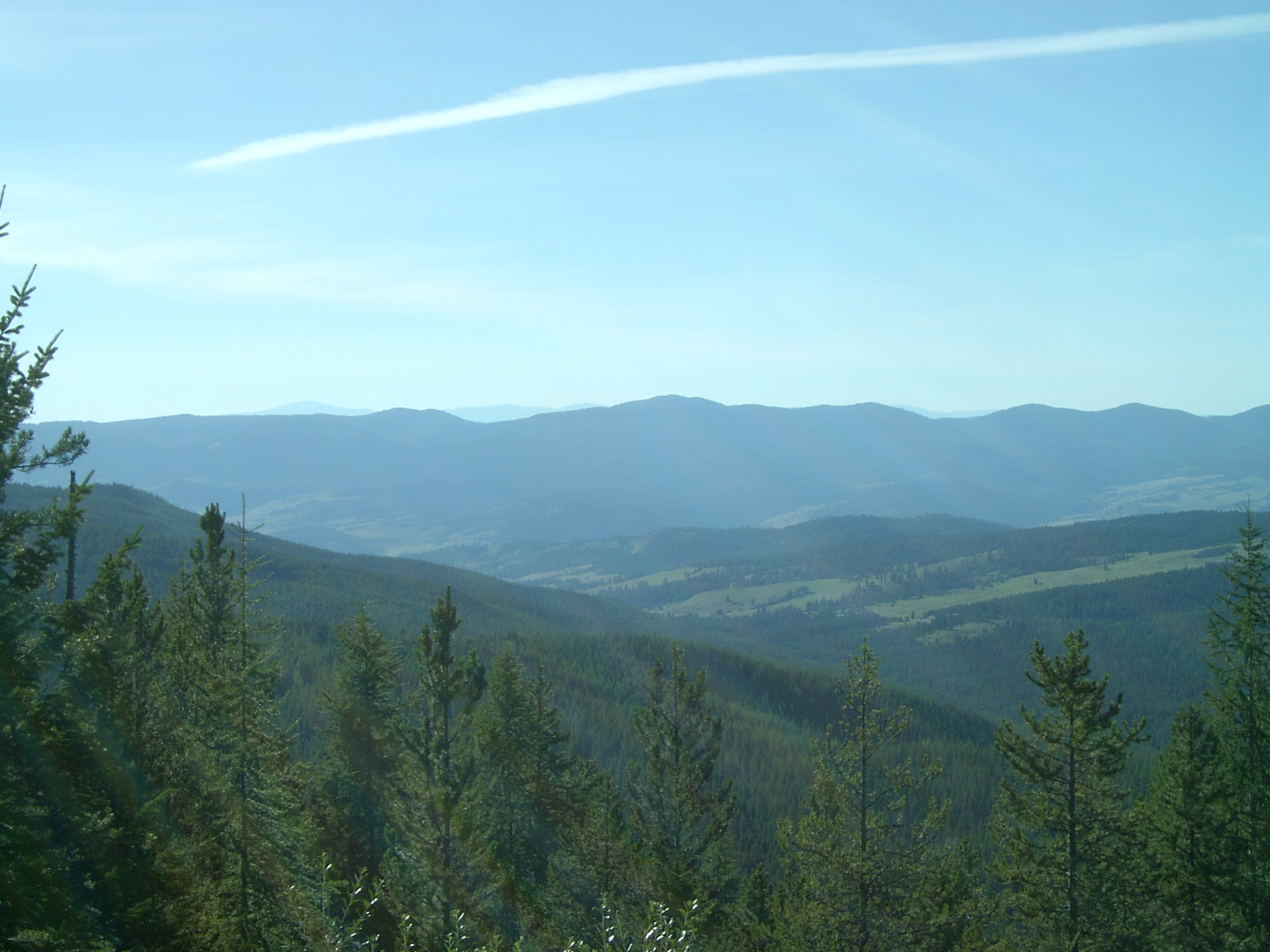
- Deer Creek Valley, 2006

- Location within Washington (state) Location within the United States
- Elevation: 4,600 feet (1,400 m)
- Traversed by: County Road 602

Third Approach
- Location: Ferry County, Washington, U.S.
- Range: Kettle River Range, Columbia Mountains
- Coordinates: 48.863658°N 118.395281°W

Boulder–Deer Creek Pass is a mountain pass through the Kettle River Range of Ferry County, Washington, United States. County Road 602, the Boulder Creek Road, formerly called the Deer Creek-Boulder Creek Road, traverses the pass from Curlew to U.S. Route 395. The pass is located in the northern section of Ferry County and is the northern most pass across the Kettle River Range in the county. With an elevation of 4,600 ft (1,400 m), it is lower than the more frequently traveled Sherman Pass to the south. The pass is the northern terminus of the Kettle Crest Trail, a National Recreation Trail itself part of the greater Pacific Northwest National Scenic Trail.

== Route ==
Boulder–Deer Creek Pass is fully paved two-lane road and one of several critical secondary roads that provide access into and out of Ferry County. Its eastern terminus is with U.S. Route 395 south of Orient, while the western end forms a junction with State Route 21 at Curlew, and the western continuation of the road is labeled as the West Kettle River Road. Boulder Creek Road is one of three passes crossing the Kettle River Range, and the northern most. To the south are Sherman Pass which is traversed by State Route 20, and in the southern Kettle River Range is Bridge Creek Pass between State Route 21 and Inchelium. The road starts at approximately 1,800 ft (550 m) at Curlew and climbs up to a crest of 4,600 ft (1,400 m) and then drops back down to about 1,400 ft (430 m) at Highway 395.

== Ecology ==
Much of northern Ferry County is dominated by temperate coniferous forests maintained by the Colville National Forest and as private land. The forests at the lower elevations of the Kettle River Valley are mixed Douglas fir and ponderosa pine, which intergrade into mixed Douglas fir, lodgepole pine, and western larch at mid-elevation and finally into mixed Engelmann spruce, subalpine fir, and lodgepole pine forests at the highest Kettle Range elevations. Within the Deer Creek and North Boulder Creek stream valleys are well developed groves of alder, dogwood, and larch trees, with intermixed shrubby devilsclub, serviceberry, gooseberry, and thimbleberry. Also noted in close proximity to the streams are four distinct species of moonwort ferns. The entire pass area was burned in the 2015 Stickpin fire and is slowly recovering.

Within the Boulder Creek watershed beaver are present, while in the streams Westslope cutthroat trout, and native subspecies of redband trout are present. The larger Boulder creek area has been identified as potential Grizzly bear reintroduction habitat. The region is an important area of marten habitat, and a noted hybridization zone between Pacific marten and American marten. Snowshoe hare are known to take advantage of the groomed ski trails in winter to move through the region. Large herbivores include mule deer, white-tail deer and moose. With expansion of the American wolf back into Washington starting around 2008, Boulder–Deer Creek Pass has been part of the "Togo pack" territory since 2017. The breeding pair of the pack normally dens to the north of the pass area, and the pack consisted of six members in 2024.

== History ==
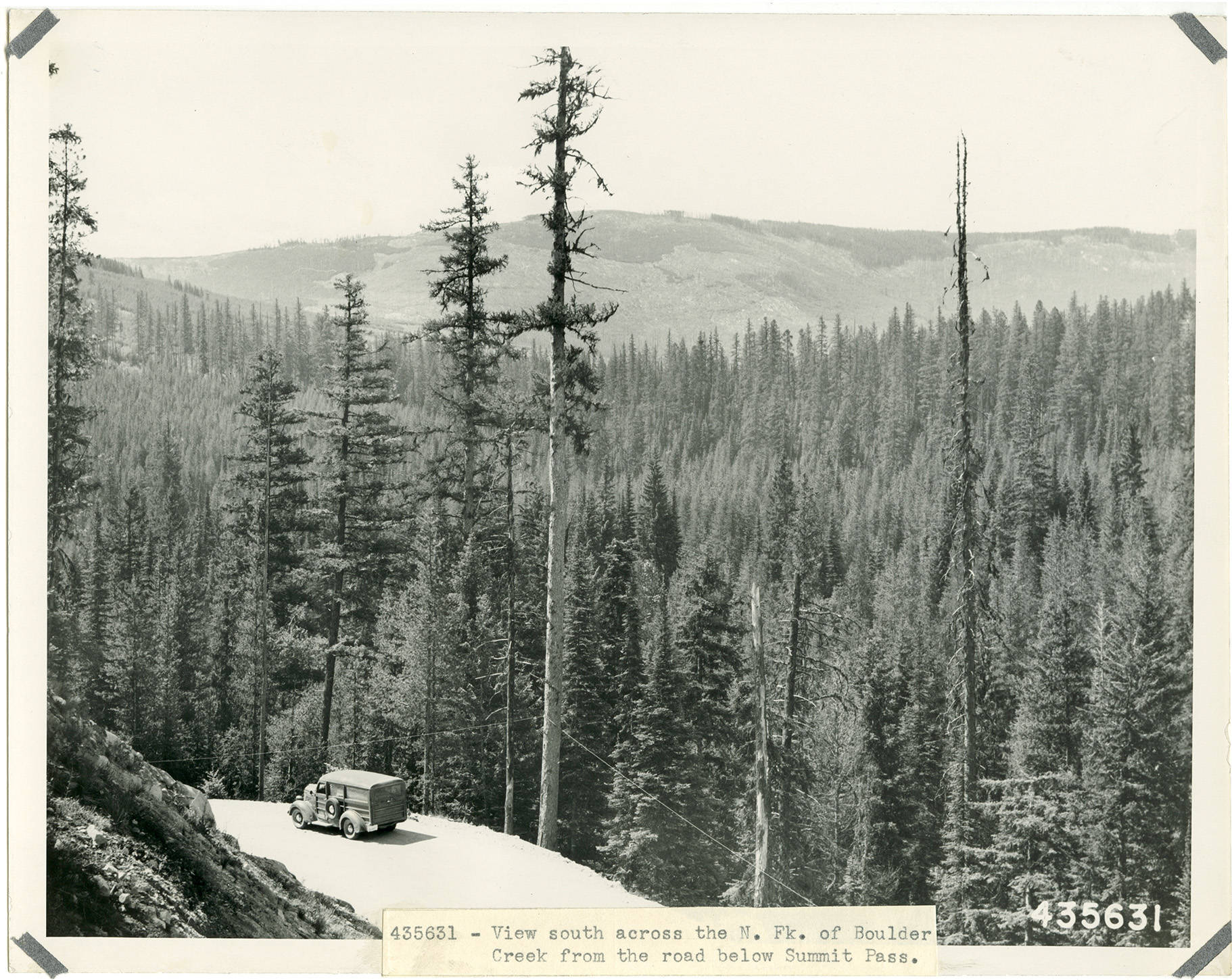
Box truck on the pass, 1946

The route was first used as a wagon route up Boulder Creek, with conversion to an automobile pass happening in the 1920s. Summer work during 1924 was noted to have included grading and extension of the road in conjunction with extension of the road through Orient south towards Barstow. In the early years of the pass the route was closed during the winters due to snow. In the 1928-1929 winter, the pass was closed due to snow and poor road conditions until opening in on May 10, 1929. In 1938 only the lower sections of the pass on the east and west end were snow free as of April 23.

By 1948 a 15.498 mi (24.942 km) section of the pass was in need of resurfacing, and was contracted to be fixed by a Longview, Washington company. Another section was deteriorating by 1964, with a 2.087 mi (3.359 km) section in need of resurfacing. Initial state project bidding was announced by April 4th and opened for bid submission on April 28th. The anticipated cost of the project was set at $15,000 (equivalent to about $155,700 in 2025). The project was elaborated on to include the building of a gravel road bed, a crushed cover stone layer and a crushed surface stone/bituminous surface incorporating 75 short tons (68 t) of asphalt and 9,700 cu yd (7,400 m^{3}) of rock. Bid submission was open until August 13, 1963. The winning bid of $15,385 (equivalent to about $159,700 in 2025), by a Spokane company, was announced April 29, 1964.

The national forest campsite at Boulder–Deer Creek Summit, which had been maintained since the 1940s and had improvements in 1945, was defunded in 1982. The campsite in 1962 had four camping slots, spaces for trailers, and camp stoves, but no drinkable water. Boulder–Deer Creek Summit was one of four campgrounds that were axed by the Colville National Forest with all amenities removed due to budget cuts. It was one of five free use sites in the national forest that the service removed.

The scattered rural housing present along the western slopes of Deer Creek drainage on both sides of Boulder Creek Road are considered part of the greater "Boulder neighborhood", while the area between the summit and the Kettle River to the east is included in the "Boulder – Deadman Neighborhood"

== Recreation ==
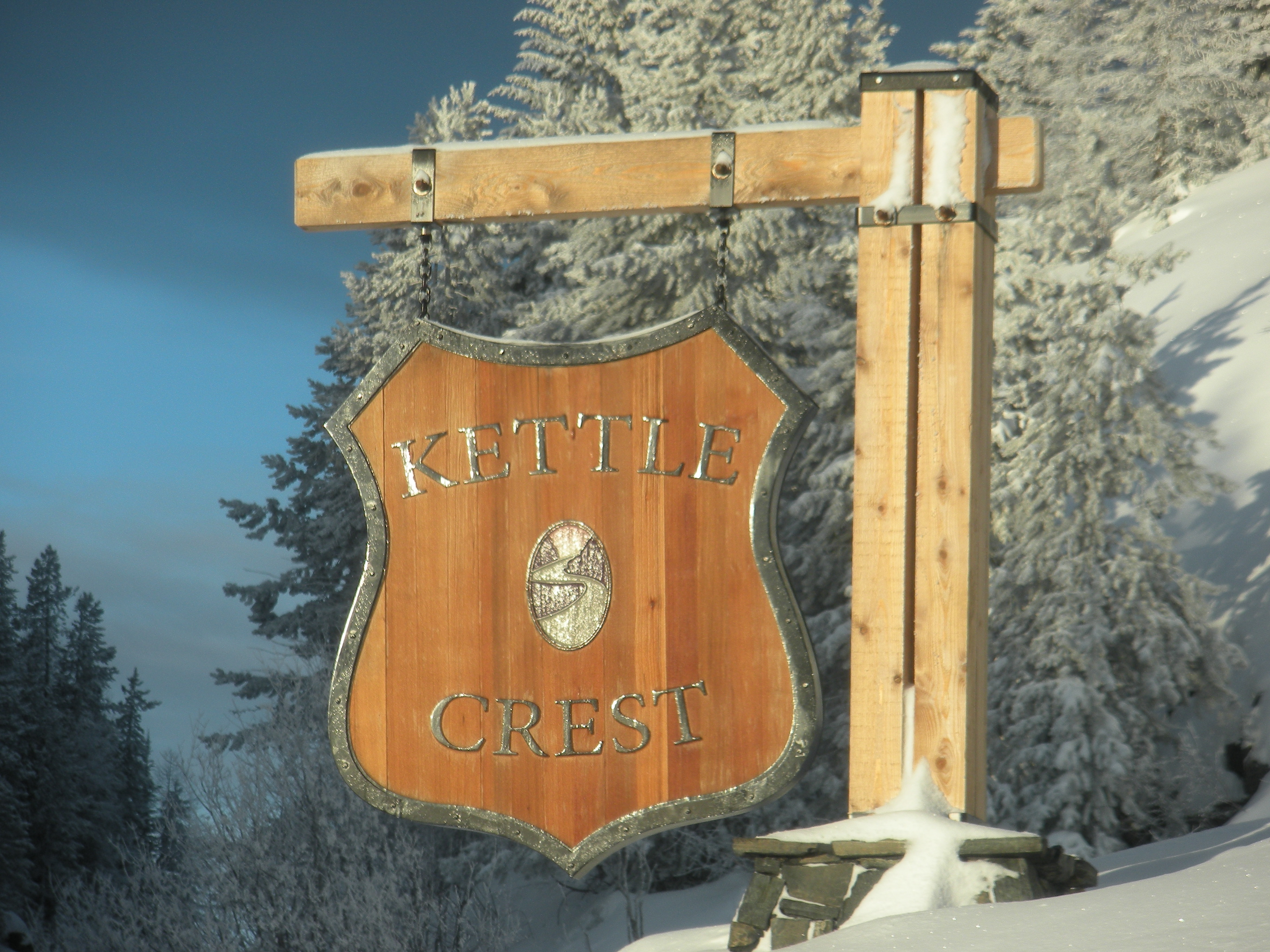
Kettle Crest Trail sign in winter

Parking for a number of trail heads and for the south Sno-park is located on the south side of Boulder–Deer Creek Summit on the south side of 602. The paved parking area has room for 20 vehicles and is equipped with a vault toilet. During the winter 12 mi (19 km) of groomed trails Cross-country ski trails are maintained, for use by Nordic and Skate skiers. Snowshoeing access is allowed along the trail sides. Use of the parking is Free between April 1 and November 31, and with possession of a Sno-park pass December 1 through March 31. The parking area is the northern terminus for the Kettle Crest Trail section 13N, which is a designated section of the larger Pacific Northwest National Scenic Trail.

Across Boulder Creek Road on the north side of the summit is the Deer Creek Forest Campground. Designated as a high altitude campground the site is officially open between May 17 - October 28 with spots for tent and RV camping plus horse corrals. The site is considered more suited to tent camping, with no running water or electricity and each site is equipped with fire-ring, table, and 50–60 ft (15–18 m) parking spur or pull through. There is a vault toilet and a watering trough for horses is available in the south sno-park parking area.

== Wildfires ==
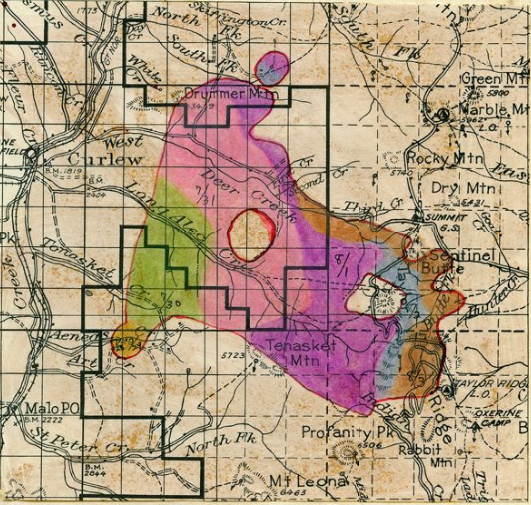
Color coded daily expansion of the 1934 Aeneas Creek Fire

The Kettle River range has a documented history of large wildfires over the past century. Colville National Forest records attribute the smaller fire seasons in the early 1900s to wet summer conditions preventing larger conflagrations, and larger fire seasons such 1910, 1914, and 1920, to dry conditions. 1929 saw abnormally dry conditions across the region, the daily high winds blowing from the south exacerbating the 6% to 10% ambient humidity. Started on the eastern slope of the Kettle Range, the area of Boulder Creek south to around 12 mi (19 km) north of the Colville Reservations northern border was burned in the massive Dollar Mountain Fire which destroyed an low estimate of 98,000 acres (40,000 ha) or up to 142,000 acres (57,000 ha). The fire was finally extinguished in late fall of 1929.

Four years later the pass area was again subjected to a large wildfire, this time coming up the from the south on the western slope of the Kettle Range. The 1934 Aeneas Creek Fire started on July 29th in the Aeneas Creek Watershed by a dropped cigarette and spread northeast across the ridge line towards the Boulder Creek watershed. By July 31 the lower areas of the watershed and the road were in the fire zone. Burning continued along a small area of the highway on August 1 but mostly spread southeast across the mass of Tenasket Mountain. On August 3 the fire flared and spread across the highway again before containment. The fire was controlled by an estimated 2000 firefighters from the region including much of the Civilian Conservation Corps troop stationed at Camp Growden east of Sherman Pass.

A small but persistent fire broke out at the summit near Marble Lookout in early October 1970. The fire was the result of winds whipping flames out of a slash pile burn on October 3 and spreading overnight to about 200 acres (81 ha). A crew of 200 firefighters built 10 mi (16 km) of fire-line containment and several aircraft dropped fire retardants on the fire.

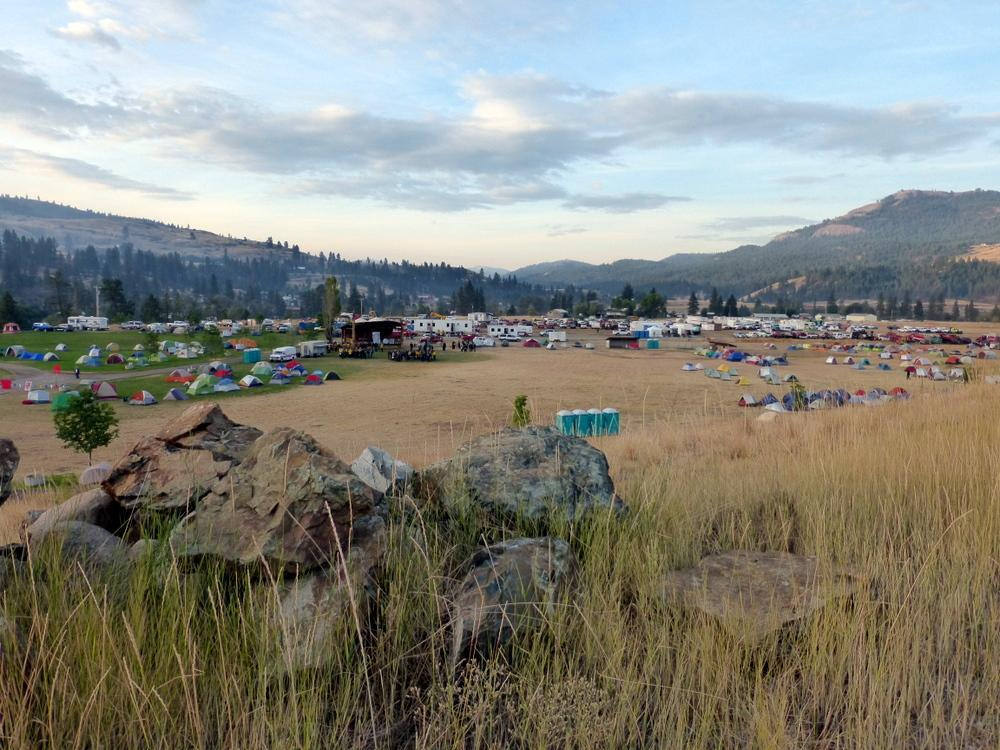
2015 Kettle Complex Fire evacuees at Kettle Falls

In 2015, the Kettle Complex Stickpin Fire started by a lightning strike in the Profanity Peak roadless area south of the Boulder Creek road on August 11. It grew and moved north across the pass area and into areas of recovered Aeneas Creek and Dollar Mountain fire burn. Boulder Creek Pass was closed to though traffic at both Curlew and Highway 395, with traffic being routed south to Sherman Pass. The fire stalled out due to loss of fuels when it burned to the perimeter of the 2003 Togo fire.

The 2015 Ferry County, Washington Community Wildfire Protection Plan (CWPP) outlines the fire response organizations who oversee the Boulder Creek Road. The western stretch from Curlew to just before the summit region is within Ferry County Fire District 13 jurisdiction, with some land tracts in the surrounding watersheds placed under Washington State Department of Natural Resources oversight. The remaining highway is almost all Colville National Forest responsibility, with only the very eastern few miles covered by Ferry county Fire District 3. Boulder Creek is a designated alternate evacuation route from Curlew and the region in cases of wild fires.
