= Dollar Mountain Fire =

1929 wildfire in Washington, U.S.

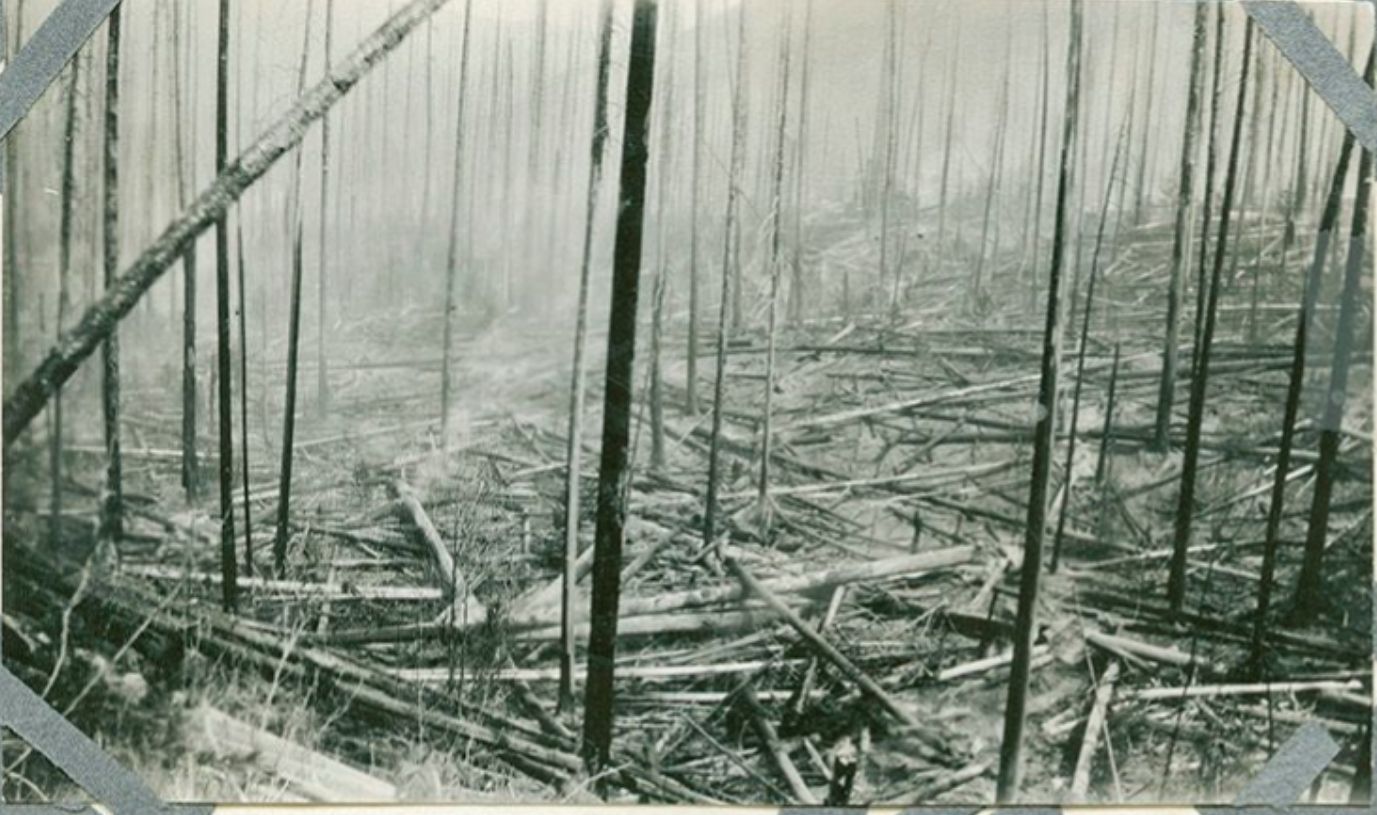
- Fire damage in the Sherman Creek watershed
- Date: August 4, 1929 – "Late Fall"
- Location: Kettle River Range; Ferry County, Washington, U.S.
- Coordinates: 48°36.4′N 118°28.8′W

Statistics
- Burned area: 98,000–142,000 acres (400–570 km^{2})
- Land use: National Forest

Ignition
- Cause: Careless campers or cigarette

Map
- Approximate location of the Dollar Mountain Fire

The Dollar Mountain Fire was one of the earliest large scale wildfires in Ferry County, Washington, United States. Starting on August 4, 1929, and burning an estimated 98,000–142,000 acres (400–570 km^{2}) of Colville National Forest land in the Kettle River Range, east of Republic, Washington, the conflagration was contained by mid-September, but only finally extinguished due to weather changes late in the year. Fire crews came from across the region, including Portland, Oregon, Seattle, and Spokane, Washington, and across British Columbia.

== Background ==
Much of northern Ferry County is dominated by temperate coniferous forests maintained by the Colville National Forest and as private land. The forests at the lower elevation are mixed Douglas fir and ponderosa pine, which intergrade into mixed Douglas fir, lodgepole pine, and western larch at mid-elevation and finally into mixed Engelmann spruce, subalpine fir, and lodgepole pine forests at the highest elevations.

The Kettle River Range had a history of wildfires with fires first reported in the early 1910s. According to Colville National Forest records, the turn of the century through 1910 were wet and fires scant or non-existent. This changed with the 1910 fire season, in which there were five major fires. These included the Lost Creek Fire, which burned all summer and engulfed more area than the other four fires combined. The fire seasons were smaller for the next few years but flared up in 1914 with five fires, none of which was listed as major. The years between 1915 and 1919 saw one large active fire season, 1918, where 50 fires in total were seen, but less than 2,000 acres (810 ha) were burned.

The fire season of 1920 saw the largest acreage losses to that point in the Colville National Forest lands, with four large conflagrations. These were Coco, Golden Harvest, Indian Creek, and Pierre, which burned 3,000 acres (1,200 ha), 5,410 acres (2,190 ha), 7,680 acres (3,110 ha), and 6,465 acres (2,616 ha) respectively. The four in conjunction with 84 other small to medium fires over the season consumed 34,747 acres (14,062 ha).

The following year, 23,298 acres (9,428 ha) were lost to 93 fires, the largest being the Linderman and Flat Creek Fires. Fires were a summer regularity over years 1922-1928 with several "quieter" summers and several heavy summers. Fire lookouts in this time period evolved from the pre-1921 tents, transient wooden structures, or primitive fire lookouts to first and second generation wooden fire lookouts. 1929 saw abnormally dry conditions across the region, the daily high winds blowing from the south exacerbating the 6% to 10% ambient humidity.

== Fire ==
The fire started sometime on August 4 in the Barnaby Creek drainage. This was initially suggested to have been caused by lightning strike; however, no thunderstorms or lightning had been reported that day in the region. Further investigation pinned the start on careless campers who had been in the area at the time, possibly either a smoker's or a blackberry pickers fire. In addition to the windy, hot, and dry conditions, the fire's behavior was unpredictable, with the forest service noting that single day "runs" of 5–6 mi (8.0–9.7 km) were not uncommon and that already burned areas were frequently reigniting.

As many as 300 Canadian Doukhobor firefighters flowed into the area to assist the official recruits and volunteers. On August 8, one such crew of approximately 65 men was surrounded and trapped by flames in the Barnaby Creek area. (Note: Specifically, they were trapped near what was later named Doukhobor Creek. Doukhobor Creek is a tributary of Barnaby Creek.) The group sought shelter overnight with a creek nearby. The next morning the flames had moved far enough away for the whole crew to walk back out of the burn zone over several miles. It was feared that the entire crew had been overtaken by the fire, and one source noted all 65 surviving was "only by good judgement of the overhead". To commemorate the event, the nearby stream was named Doukhobor Creek. Another near miss occurred on August 12 when strong winds drove the fireline towards two camps with 300 total firefighters. The flames engulfed both camps and destroyed equipment and belongings, but the men moved only minutes before the firewall arrived.

One known fatality has been linked to the Dollar Mountain fire, Vasiliy P. Makeiff, or wrongly reported as William Mikaryoff. The Doukhobor firefighter suffered a fracturing of his skull when he was hit by a falling tree on August 15, 1929. He was transported east to Mount Carmel Hospital in Colville, Washington, but died from his wound.

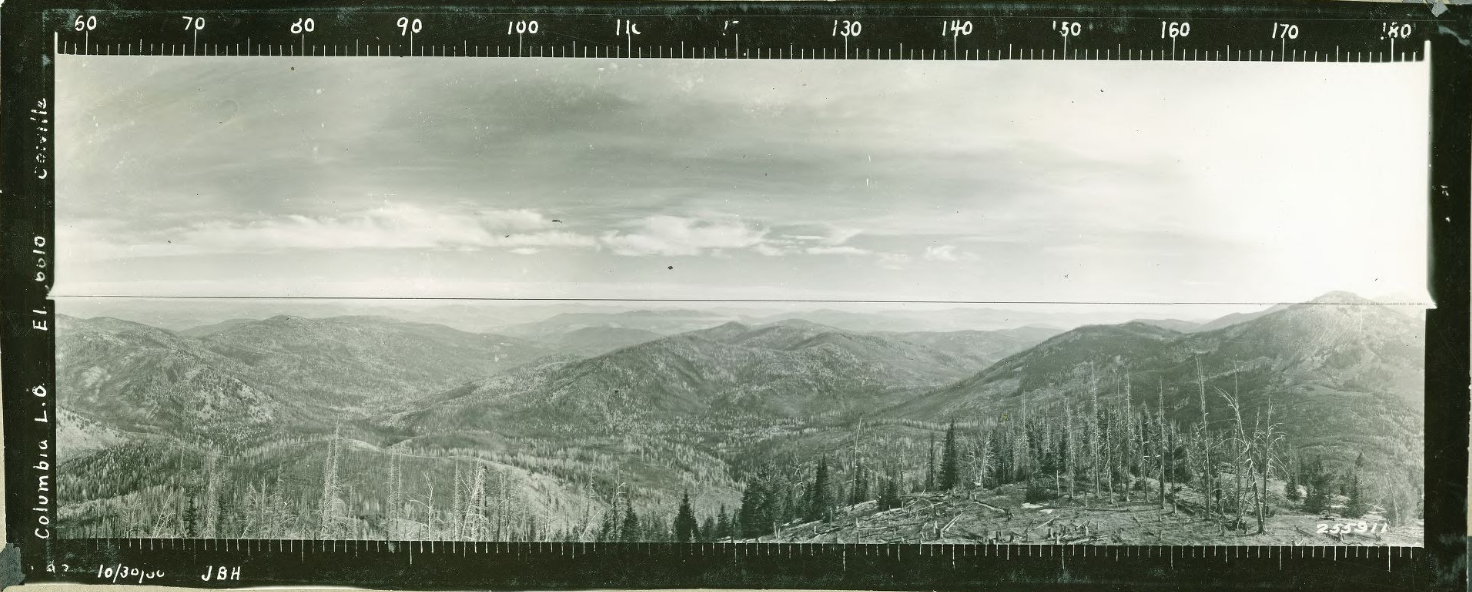
Columbia Mountain Lookout azimuths 55 – 185 looking over Dollar Mountain burn damage

By August 27, 450 men had been garrisoned in the Barnaby Creek area, with additional crews out of the ranger stations at Bangs Mountain, Growden, Sherman Creek, and Trout Lake. The ranger station crews were tasked with forming and maintaining fire lines along the southwestern, southeastern, and southern edges of the fire. The northern edge of the fire was unmaintained and being wind-driven in that direction. At the time of reporting the fires extended in a region about 12 mi (19 km) north of the center of the Colville Reservation north to just south of the Canadian border, and was up to 8 mi (13 km) at its widest.

By September 1, the number of people on the fire had grown to 650 but efforts to check the northward progression of the fire were failing. The northern fireline was then 18 mi (29 km) north of original ignition site, and encompassed about 70,000 acres (280 km^{2}). The fire was reported to be under control on September 14, though the outlook was cautious as heavy winds were still possible and could whip it up again. At the time of containment, the fire was estimated 98,000 acres (400 km^{2}) in size. The fire was fully out by October 13 when an estimate of 100,000 acres (400 km^{2}) burned was given.

== Aftermath ==
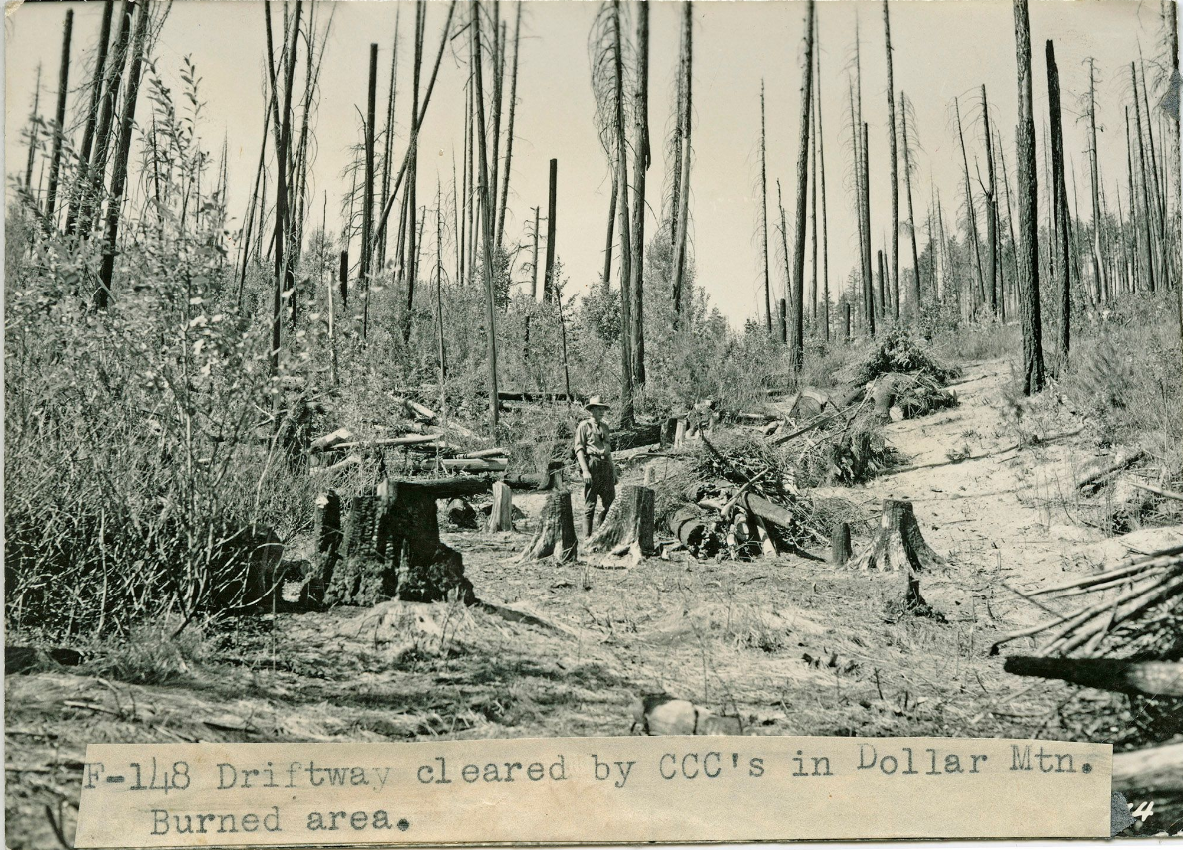
CCC workers clearing a track through Dollar Mountain downed timber

By the time the fire was fully quelled in what the Forest Service estimated was the "late fall" of 1929, the blaze had burned an estimated 98,000 acres (40,000 ha) or 142,000 acres (57,000 ha). The fire was the largest fire for the still young Colville National Forest, and also one of the largest fires in the nation over the 1929 fire season. In the years after the fire, efforts were stepped up to assess the fire detection system in the Colville National Forest as a whole, with a full survey being performed and funding allocated to improvement. A number of additional fire lookouts were approved and built along the backbone of the Kettles, which were seasonally or continuously manned until their eventual decommission. Stations inaccessible to wheeled vehicles had the lumber and building material packed in by men and tandem-horse teams in custom made harnesses.

Originally established in 1927 with 17,000 acres (6,900 ha) of national forest, the San Poil State Game Reserve was expanded after the Dollar Mountain Fire. The new boundaries increased northwards to the Deer Creek-Boulder Creek Road to encompass the majority of the burn zone. Upon expansion, the 345,600 acres (139,900 ha) reserve was renamed the Dollar Mountain Game reserve. The reserve maintained its boundaries for under 10 years, with the northern half being removed from reserve status in 1937. The remaining 188,800 acres (76,400 ha) area was fully opened for hunting in 1940.

In 1938 Civilian Conservation Corps workers living at Camp Growden were tasked with fire hazard mitigation and other cleanup work in the surrounding Dollar Mountain Burn. Major focuses were snag patch cleaning to remove standing dead trees and fire line construction in preparation for controlled burns in service of fire management. Much of the timber cut was put through the small saw mill at Camp Growden and turned into low cost lumber.

The site of Camp Growden and the dry log flume used by the CCC are preserved as national forest sites of interest along the Sherman Pass Scenic Byway in the Sherman Creek Valley. The camp is almost fully gone, and interpretive signage has been put up talking about Growden. The 2 mi (3.2 km) long Log Flume Heritage trail showcases lingering evidence of the log flume from Camp Growden to the Columbia River lumber mills and passing through areas of Dollar Mountain Fire regrowth.
