= Leadpoint, Washington =

Ghost town in Washington, United States

- Ghost town
- Location within Washington (state) Location within the United States
- Coordinates: 48°54′34″N 117°35′15″W
- Country: United States
- State: Washington
- County: Stevens
- Founded: 1890s
- Time zone: UTC-8 (Pacific (PST))
  - Summer (DST): UTC-7 (PDT)

Leadpoint is a ghost town in Stevens County, Washington, United States. The town is located in the mountains southeast of Northport. Leadpoint was a mining town founded during the 1890s. High grade lead was discovered in the area which led to the creation of Leadpoint. Leadpoint had a population of 200. It had a hotel, general store, barbershop, and several other businesses. Eventually, Leadpoint became a ghost town.

The Pacific Northwest National Scenic Trail passes through Leadpoint along its 1,200 mile journey from the Continental Divide in Montana to the Pacific Ocean in Washington.

The Lead Point One Room Schoolhouse still stands in the town.
