= Colville National Forest =

U.S. National Forest in northeastern Washington state

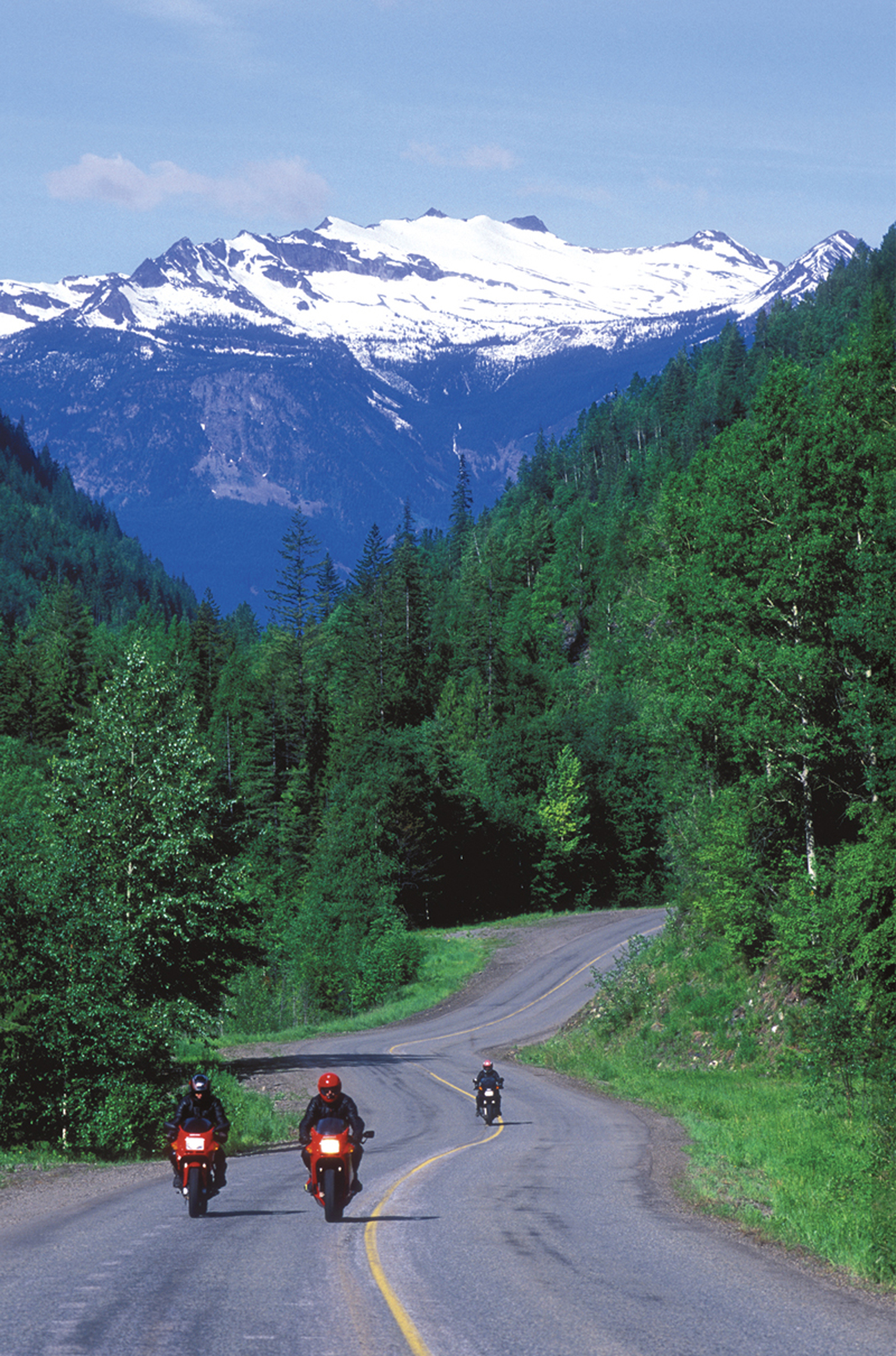

- Location within Washington (state) Location within the United States
- Location: Washington, United States
- Nearest city: Colville, WA
- Coordinates: 48.688°N 117.625°W
- Area: 1,500,000 acres (6,100 km^{2})
- Established: March 1, 1907
- Governing body: U.S. Forest Service
- Website: Colville National Forest

The Colville National Forest is a U.S. National Forest located in northeastern Washington state. It is bordered on the west by the Okanogan–Wenatchee National Forest and the Kaniksu National Forest to the east. The forest also borders Little Pend Oreille National Wildlife Refuge and the Lake Roosevelt National Recreation Area.

As of October 2020, the Colville National Forest now includes the Tonasket Ranger District, which was previously part of the Okanogan–Wenatchee National Forest.

== Geography ==
The forest encompasses a mountainous area consisting of the Kettle River and Selkirk mountain ranges, and the upper reaches of the Columbia River. The mountain ranges and forest are located mostly within the Columbia Mountains, which are part of the western foothills of the Rocky Mountains.

The forest has a total area of 1.5 million acres. A 1993 Forest Service study estimated that the extent of old growth in the Forest was 212,488 acres (85,991 ha). In descending order of forestland area it is located in parts of Ferry, Pend Oreille, Okanogan, and Stevens counties. The forest headquarters is located in Colville, Washington. There are local ranger district offices located in Kettle Falls, Metaline Falls, Newport, Republic, and Tonasket. Most of the Salmo-Priest Wilderness lies within the forest, while its southeastern portion extends into Kaniksu National Forest. With the inclusion of the Tonasket Ranger District, portions of the Pasayten Wilderness are within the forest.

== Fauna ==
Wildlife include grizzly and black bears, wolf packs, bighorn sheep, cougars, bald eagles, Canada lynx, moose, beavers, loons, and up until recently, the last remaining herd of caribou in the lower 48 US states.

== Other protected areas ==
The Pacific Northwest National Scenic Trail passes through the Colville National Forest. It enters the forest on the east side within the Salmo-Priest Wilderness, crosses the Pend Oreille River at Boundary Dam, passes through Leadpoint and Northport, then traverses the Kettle Range and exits the Colville near Republic. The Sullivan Lake Trail, designated a National Recreation Trail in 1978, runs 4.3 miles (6.9 km) between two campgrounds in the forest. The site of the Civilian Conservation Corps only permanent site in the forest, Camp Growden, is preserved as a road side heritage stop between Sherman Pass and Kettle Falls.

== See also ==
- List of national forests of the United States
- International Selkirk Loop
