= Camp Growden =

Former CCC site in Ferry County, Washington

Growden Heritage Site
- CCC Camp Growden
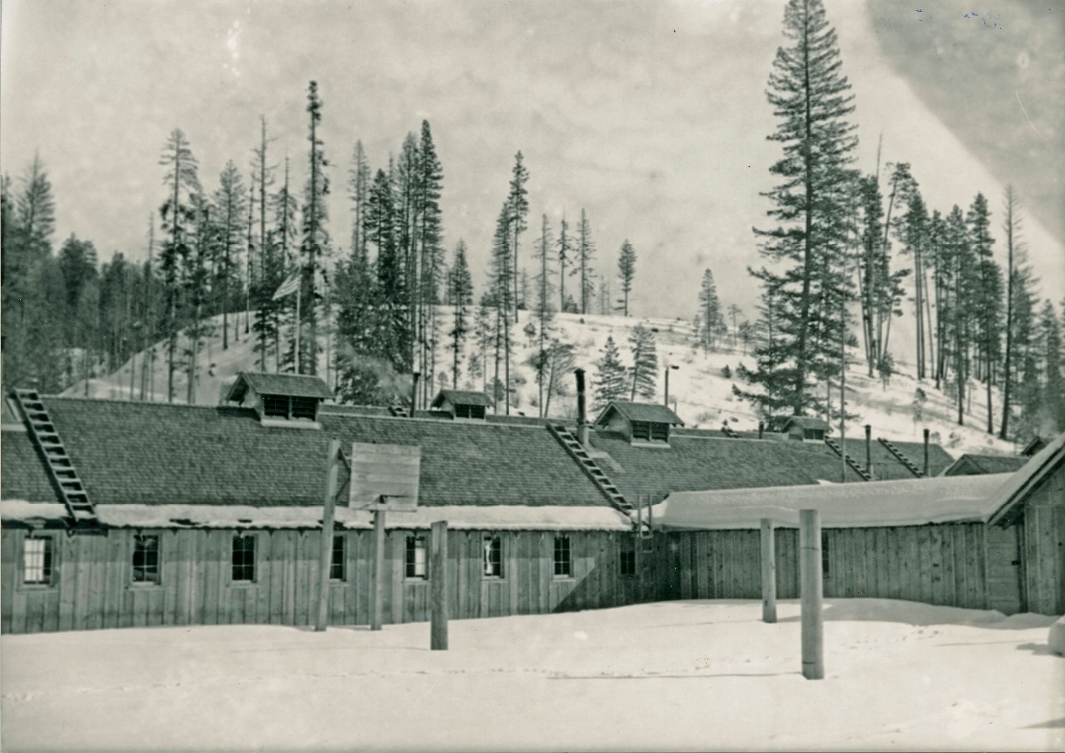
- Camp Growden buildings in winter circa 1934–1941

- Location within Washington (state)
- map showing the location of Camp Growden
- Nearest town: Kettle Falls, Washington, US
- Coordinates: 48°35′8″N 118°18′16″W
- Average elevation: 2,500 ft (760 m)
- Established: April 1934 (CCC Growden)
- Disestablished: Spring 1941 (CCC Growden)
- Named for: CCC Camp Growden
- Administrator: Colville National Forest

Camp Growden was a Civilian Conservation Corps camp, number F-62, located in the Sherman Creek Valley east of Sherman Pass and west of Kettle Falls in Ferry County, Washington, United States. The location had formerly been used as a stage stop on the dirt road between Meyers Falls and Republic, Washington between the 1900s and 1920s, while the whole of the area is land traditionally identified as part of the Colville People's territory. Five years before the establishment of Growden, the region was burned in the Dollar Mountain Fire, the largest wildfire seen in the national forest up to then.

The CCC established a presence in the Colville National Forest in the Spring of 1933 and founded Camp Growden in April 1934 which operated as a main CCC camp for the national forest until it was closed in the spring of 1941. The camp saw year round occupation between the spring of 1936 until May 1940. Growden was one of several CCC camps nationally given the name "Little America", due to the rotation of men stationed there from across the United States. After the decommissioning of the camp and control of the site being transferred to the National Forest all but one of the original buildings on site were removed.

By the 1950s it was a small National Forest campground and later transitioned to a rest stop and heritage site. A single outbuilding remains on site, a former changing room placed by Lake Sherman for the use of the CCC men. Growden Dam and Lake Sherman, built by the Camp on the property in the 1930s were removed in the early 2010s due to a number of concerns regarding flooding instability, water heating, and poor wetlands ecology. Sherman Creek on the site was restored to a free flowing stream with the dam removal and interpretive signage added discussing the history of the stream.

== Early land use ==
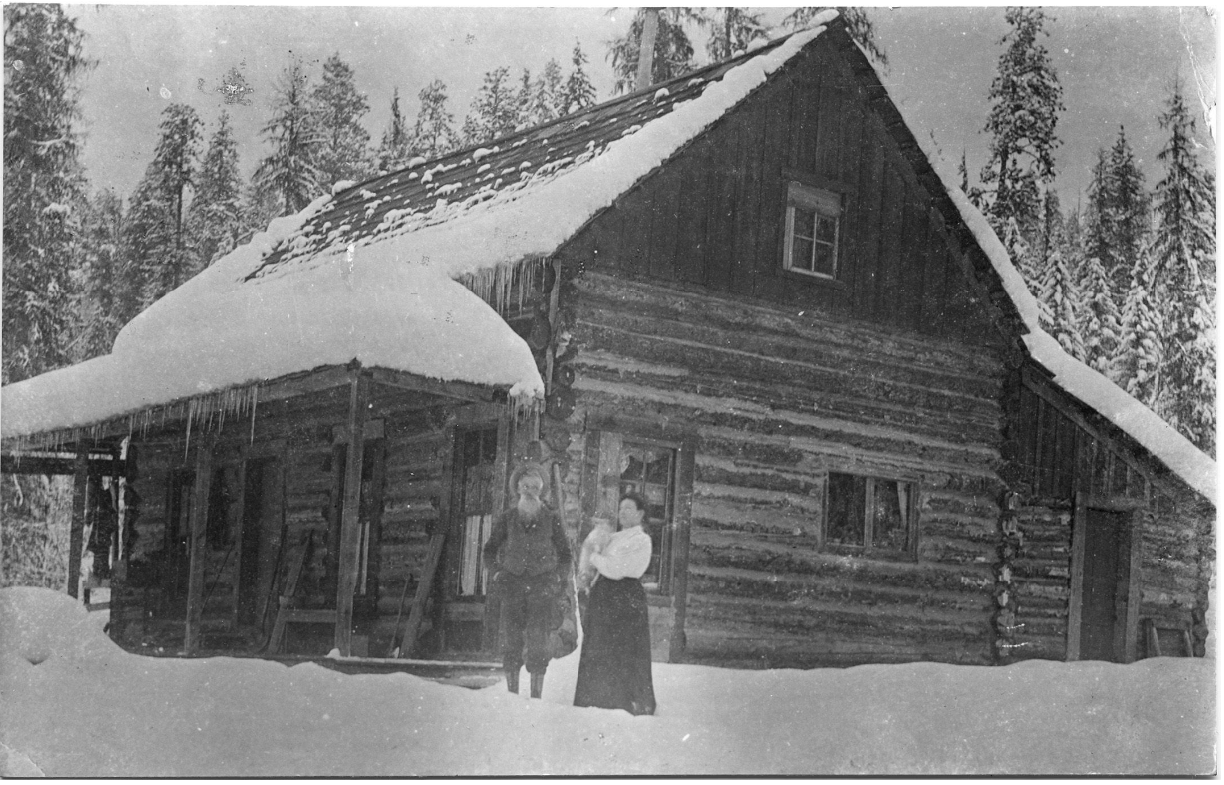
Growden stage station 1900?–1910?

Prior to the 1900s the area that would become Camp Growden was used by the Colville people and as an east-west travel route to the Sanpoil lands over the Kettle River crest. In the late 1800s a series of stage stops up the Sherman Creek valley had been established to facilitate the trade trail between Kettle Falls and Republic, Washington. One of the stops was placed at the confluence of Sherman and Lane Creeks and operated by Edmund and Amanda Growden. The lands around the Growden stage stop were extensively logged in the 1920s by operations of the White Pine Sash Company and then the Hedlund Lumber Company. Both groups developed a network of roads, log flumes, logging railroads, and buildings in the eastern to central regions of Sherman Creek Valley. A good portion of the valley area was burned by the 1929 Dollar Mountain Fire, resulting in the loss of much of the buildings and other infrastructure which had been built from 1900 to 1928. Clear cutting across the south facing mountain slopes and over the valley bottom east of Canyon Creek has been noted as a major fire break that stalled the burn progress through the area. The Growden Ranger Station survived and was still in use in 1931 when the initial survey work for what would become highway 20 passed through the valley.

== 1933 Inland Northwest Civilian Conservation Corps ==
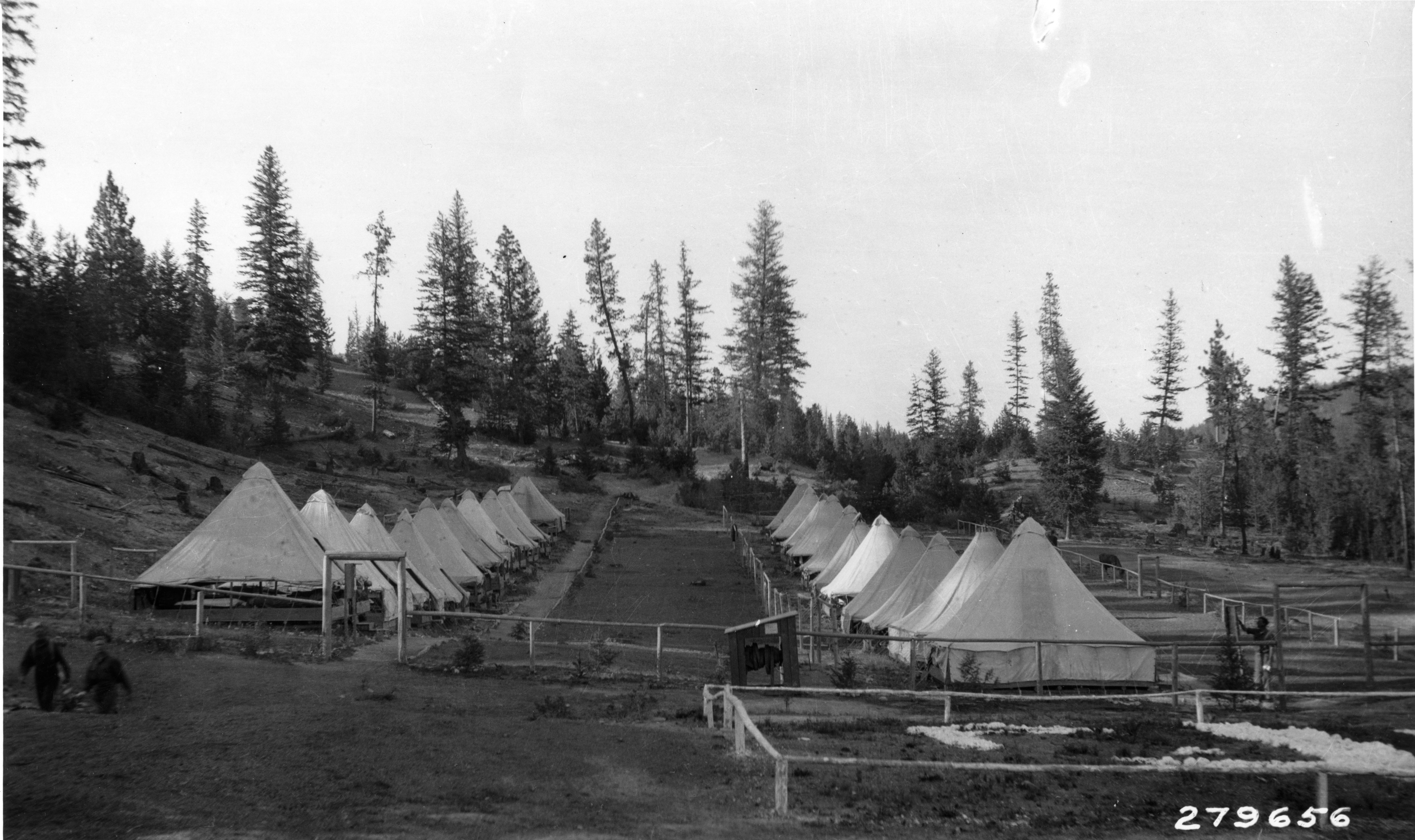
Camp Leese in the Mount Bonaparte area, 1933

In response to the Great Depression, President Franklin D. Roosevelt called for a series of New Deal programs including the establishment of a Civilian Conservation Corps (CCC). The CCC program was set up within a month of its authorization and by May 1933, the CCC's inland Northwest presence was established. The district was named for Fort George Wright in Spokane, Washington, which was the headquarters for the Fort George Wright District, and overseen by the Army Ninth Corps area command. Work in the Colville National Forest by the CCC started in spring 1933 with three temporary tent camps, T-4 Togo on Deadman Creek, T-5 Leese on Lost Lake near Mount Bonaparte, and T-6 Midget on Bolder Creek pass. Each was a tent camp set up with no permanent structures and over the summer worked on a number of projects. In November 1933 all three camps were closed.

== Off and on occupation ==
In Spring 1934 two camps were opened in the forest, F-63 a tent camp south of Republic at Quartz Mountain east of the Sanpoil River named Camp McMann, and the first permanent camp of the forest, F-62 which was called Camp Growden. July 1934 saw the announcement of select "frame" or permanent camps with buildings that would be operating throughout the coming winter of 1934–35. Camp Growden was included among the camps to operate, with new buildings to be constructed in anticipation for winter and the camp would be keeping the company of men present that summer. After the winter thaw, the Growden leadership and company were moved to F-82 Camp Pierre Lake, which was a bit east of Orient in Stevens County, Washington. At the end of fall 1935, all CCC work in the forest was halted and no CCC men were present for that winter. With the start of spring 1936, the CCC returned staffing and men to Camp Growden and maintained that staffing continually through May 1940. At that point the company was moved to F-104 "Camp Lost Lake", a newer camp location a few miles from the original Camp Leese at Mount Boneparte and near Wauconda, Washington. In October 1940 the company was again transferred back to Camp Growden for overwintering, the last time the camp would see occupation. The company was moved back to Camp Lost Lake in the Spring of 1941 for the last time, and CCC activity in the northern Colville National Forest ceased with the coming of fall 1941. The war efforts surrounding World War II having created a growing jobs market resulted in few candidates for the spartan 6 month job stints provided by the CCC, and the whole program was defunded by Congress the next year. The assets of the CCC, including Camp Growden were ordered to be liquidated by congress on July 2, 1942 and the process was reported as essentially complete on June 30, 1943.

== Camp life ==
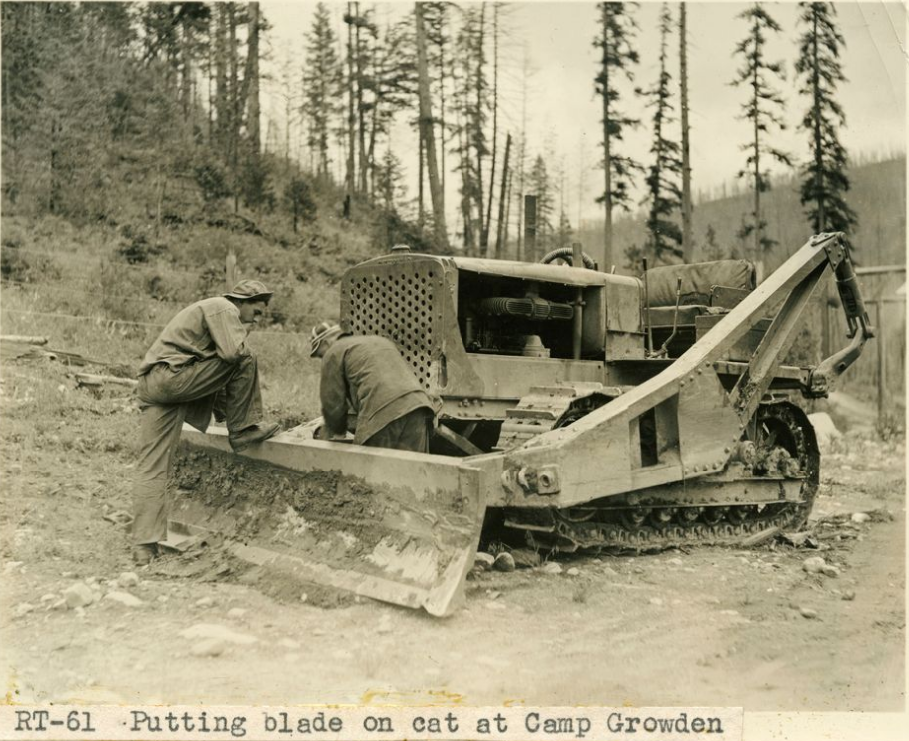
A Camp Growden bulldozer

Camp Growden was located at the junction of Lane Creek and Sherman Creek, in conjunction with the existing Growden Ranger Station. Both were next to what was then the unimproved freight road to Republic and about 10 mi (16 km) west of Kettle Falls, Washington. As a national forest CCC camp, the yearly work included many yearly forest management tasks such as firefighting, logging, and replanting burns. Furthering those tasks was the building of roads, campgrounds, and fire lookouts across the Colville National Forest. CCC camps were structured around 200-person companies, with officers coming from the military branches. The enrollees were allowed two years or four enrollments at most in the CCC, with each enrollment term being 6 months. Meals included items such as beans, mashed potatoes, venison and pie. The pay was given as a monthly salary, and of the $30 (equivalent to about $700 in 2025), the men only got $8 (equivalent to about $200 in 2025) for pay, while the other $22 (equivalent to about $500 in 2025) was deducted and sent to the family as a support during the depression.

By the Spring of 1941, the camp complex included a number of buildings and maintained lawns alongside the now-full Lake Sherman. The campus included barracks, a recreation building, and storage buildings. Housed in the various buildings, the CCC facilities provided a mess hall, library, injury ward and dispensary, machine shop, and education room. There were free classes on various skills and hobby work like shortwave radio, photography, weaving and wood burning. The recreation hall was built to accommodate up to 200 people at a time and included pool tables and a fireplace. Off-duty time could be spent playing board and card games or watching the weekly movie shown in the hall.

The camp worked closely with the Colville National Forest on most of its projects, acting as a body of reserve men for various needs. From 1936 to 1939 cooperative projects between the camp and national forest saw the erection of a number of buildings over the forest, including homes in Kettle Falls, Republic, and Tonasket for Forest Service officers. Scattered over the forest were guard stations and lookout tower units for wildland fire needs, plus machine shops and storage sheds to house needed equipment and supplies. The public benefited from the building and maintenance of range land feedways to feed roaming livestock herds, and with the hazard mitigation work in older fire scars such as the massive 1929 Dollar Mountain burn. Occasionally the CCC men were recruited to assist in game surveys of the forest and grazing land and timber surveying. A number of letters from former enrollees indicated the specialized training needed for the various cooperative projects was key in finding a stable job after the enrollment term finished and the men returned to the workforce.

=== 1934 ===
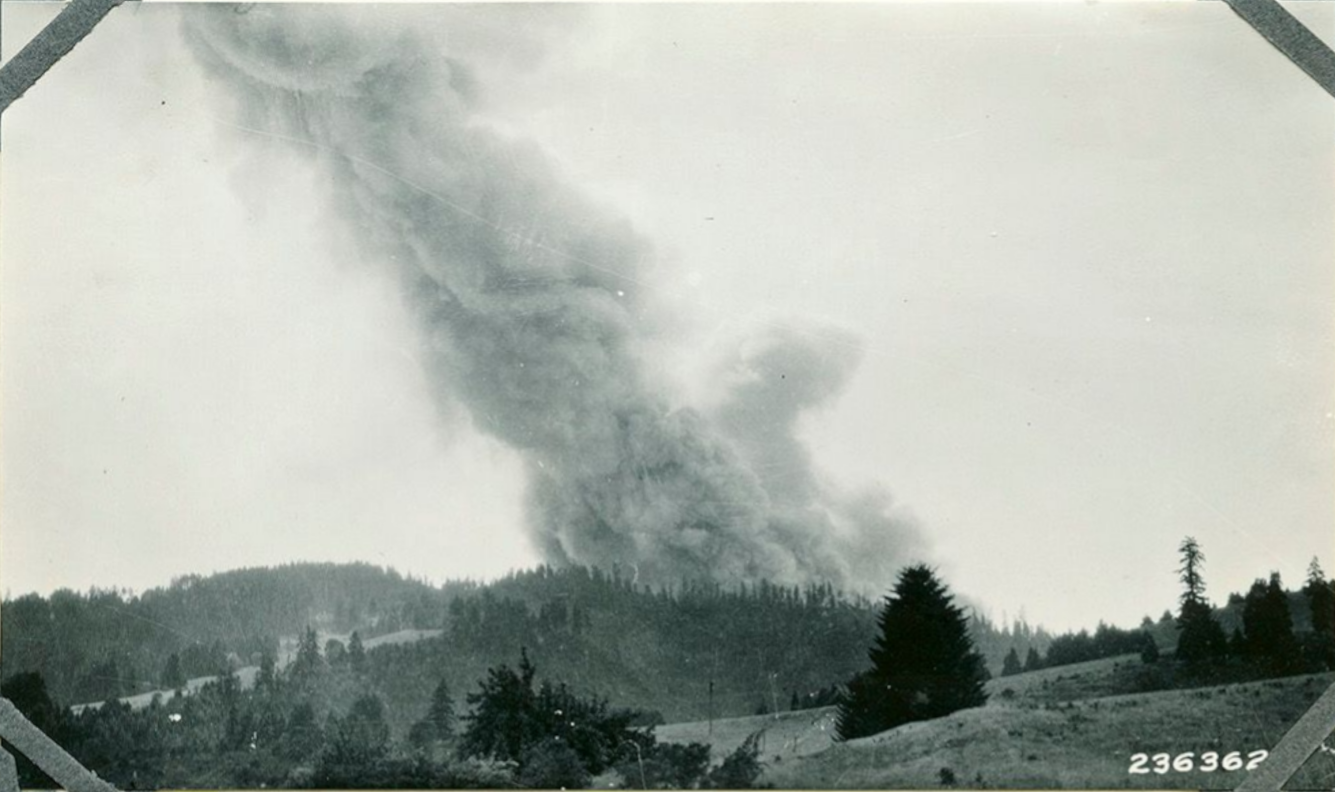
Smoke plume from the 1934 Aeneas Creek Fire

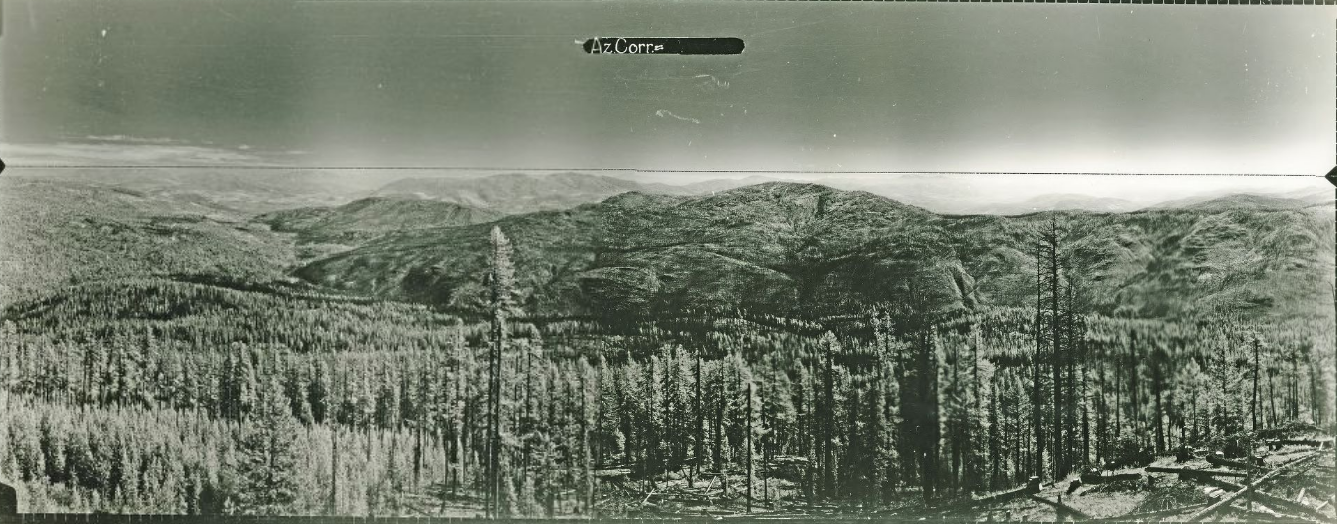
Sherman Creek Valley and Meyers Falls to Republic road Scalawag Ridge Lookout 295° - 65° azimuth

An official announcement of the first Fort Wright District camps of 1934 was published around April 10, 1934. A total of 20 camps were initially to be staffed by April 16 and 20 with nine full companies travelling up from duty in California and 11 "cadres" from California or Vancouver, Washington. Camp Growden, along with Camp McMann south of Republic, was slated to receive the Vancouver cadres arriving in Spokane on the 20th before travelling up to the Colville National Forest. Each of the cadres was composed of an officer and 25 CCC enrollees, who would be in charge of preparing the chosen camp location for the arrival of the main company about 10 days later. The main body of company 602 travelled from Spokane to Camp Growden on April 26 with company 605 who continued west to Camp McMann. The summer of 1934 was mostly dedicated to firefighting in the region, including the massive 20,000 acres (81 km^{2}) Aeneas Creek Fire east of Curlew, Washington that took an estimated 2,000 firefighters to contain. At the same time, other fires in the national forest burned an additional 9,000 acres (36 km^{2}), and fire efforts on all the blazes required help from the neighboring national forest units in the region. As a result, other CCC-designated projects were delayed until late in the year after the fires were contained or out.

On August 28, the contracts to supply construction materials for Camp Growden's winterization and permanent building were announced. Companies in Colville and Lewiston, Idaho each got a contract while groups of businesses in Spokane secured the other five. The materials to be supplied included lumber, millwork, hardware, roofing, plumbing, and electrical. In late September the list of camps in the district which would be remaining operating during the coming winter. Camp Growden was one of only ten camps to be chosen, out of the 41 open over the summer in the district. The major portion of the CCC men, around 8,000 were to be transferred south to California and another 2,000 were sent back east for release. Over the next month the preparations for company transitioning took place, with the last 80 men from Camp McMann moved over to Growden and the whole of the current company 602 working on finishing work for a winterized camp. In addition to the building work, a group of men completed the planting of approximately 65,000 two-year-old ponderosa saplings, covering about 50 acres (20 ha) of Sherman Creek Watershed. Around November 1 the entire company was also transferred to California work and a new company slated to arrive for the winter season.

November 14 saw Lieutenant Commander Clarence L. Bradfield commanding the new 184-man Company 950 had arrived and settled into camp. The company had been relocated from Camp Sullivan Lake in Idaho. The main tasks for 950 would be road building, stringing telephone lines, hazard mitigation and replanting trees. A small 16-man contingent was split out to "spike camp" in Republic. The group was bunked at the Republic ranger station and tasked with continuing Camp McMann tasks such as finishing building two houses for Rangers and a rockery wall. Two major road building projects were taken up by the 950 in November, with the continuation of Barnaby Creek road around Barnaby Butte and connecting Sherman Creek road to the Lake Ellen area in the southeast corner of the national forest. They also started work on the new Skalawag Ridge road, running up from the South Fork Sherman Creek road to the Skalawag Ridge lookout on top of the mountain overlooking Camp Growden. In camp itself, general clean up work accompanied drainage field construction and sidewalk installation. By December 19, 4 mi (6.4 km) of the Skalawag Ridge road had been completed, with CCC personnel estimating it would be finished by January 1935. With snow coming into the region, telephone line work towards Stahley and White Mountains would continue as long as snow allows, with 5 mi (8.0 km) already finished. At camp, early land clearing work was started for the proposed Lake Sherman with about 8 acres (32,000 m^{2}) being impacted. The Republic spike camp was moved into winter housing there and prep work had started in Kettle Falls to establish a similar spike camp situation. As with the Republic crew, the Kettle Falls men would be tasked with building a warehouse, several residences, and a ranger station.

=== 1935 ===
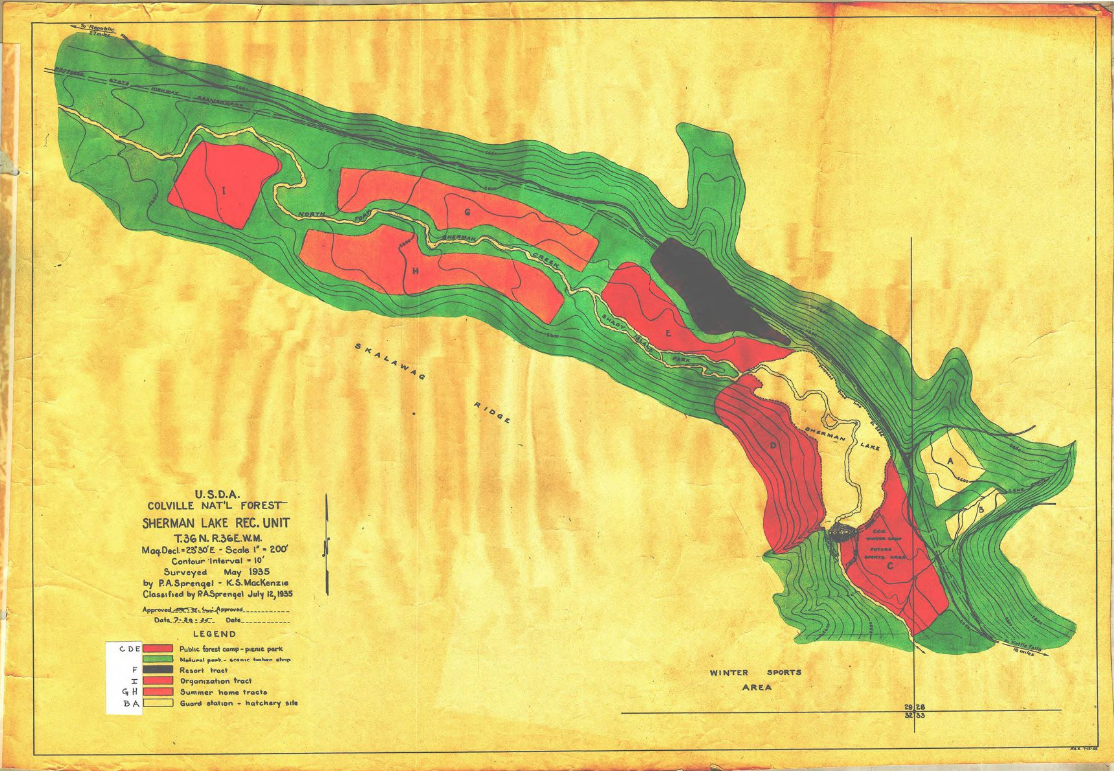
July 12, 1935, planning map of the Sherman Lake Recreation area

By January 11, a major snowfall had hit the region and impacted transportation needs in the Fort Wright District. While most winter camps were only seeing delays, District Commander Colonel Fredrick G. Knabenshue noted that it was likely Camp Growden and Camp Priest Lake may have been fully snowed in. The areas at Growden and Priest Lake already had 2–3 ft (0.61–0.91 m) of snow before the storm had hit. Knabenshue was not too worried, noting the camps were both equipped with bulldozers road clearing equipment, and shovels.

The ponderosa seedlings that were planted the prior October were reported as doing well on May 5. Another 35 acres (14 ha) patch of 40,000 seedlings was planted the prior week on Dollar Mountain in a burn scar area. The civic organizations of Colville, approximately 23 mi (37 km) east of Growden announced they were considering proposed plans to craft the land directly west of camp into a winter sports site. The height of the mountain south of camp and the duration that snow cover stayed was suggested as good conditions for the construction of ski slopes and toboggan runs. The camp started to build the Growden Dam on Sherman Creek and after completion the planned 10 acres (4.0 ha) lake would be usable for ice skating. On May 15 the camp hosted a goodwill program and dinner, inviting both the Colville and Kettle Falls Chamber of Commerce. Twelve representatives from Kettle Falls and twenty-five from Colville attended. The camp was in preparation for the announcement of summer projects involving a number of the men to be sent out as spike camps for the work.

Winter CCC plans were tentatively announced by September 20, with the district looking to have an increased volume of enrollees over what was present for the last winter. The number of camps to be open the coming winter was increased by at least 8 over the past winter's 10, and a group of seven others being tentatively considered. Camp Growden and two other already built camps were not on the open list, but were awaiting authorization to occupy. If the high number of camps were opened the total enrollee count in the district would have been 5,000 men. On September 25 it was announced that the following week, mass enrollee movements would start, with companies moving to the winter camps to the east and south. A group of 345 CCC men from the Republic district were slated to be shipped back to Fort Dix and then discharged.

=== 1936 ===
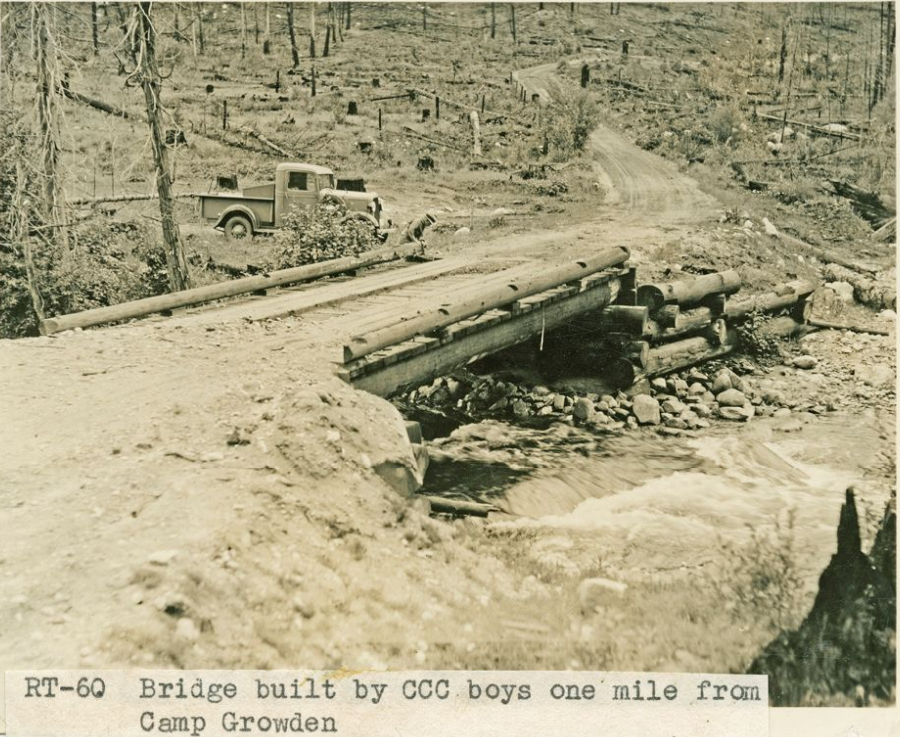
A 1936 build bridge over Sherman Creek

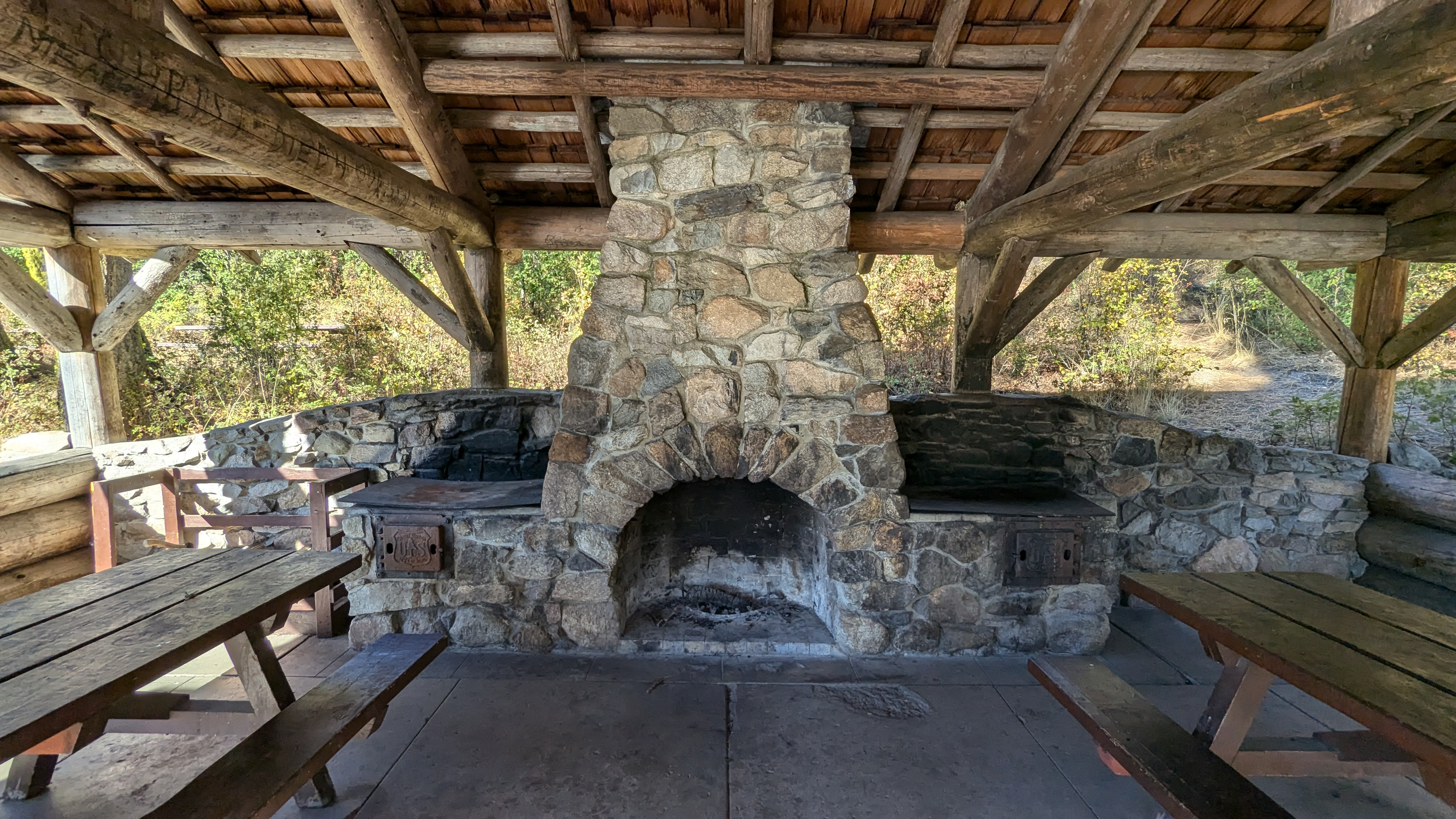
The Swan Lake Kitchen, built during the 1936 season

By late March the district was starting to prepare for incoming enrollees for the spring season. Part of the preparation included confirming that the number of enrollees would be maintained at the 1935 level of 3,000 through March 1937. To accomplish that, decisions were being made on what camps to keep open, reopen, or abandon. Camp Growden was at this point on the tentative list of camps that would be reactivated, though it was noted that reactivation status was subject to change. Within a month of the tentative camp list, the district saw official announcement that Camp Growden, along with four other camps in the district would be indeed be returned to active status after being idled for the winter. The April announcement also noted the incoming CCC company for Growden would be arriving from outside the district. April 21 came with the announcement of the Camp Growden company being transferred into the camp from their winter placement at Camp Entiat. The actual arrival of the company was delayed, however, by widespread flooding from the spring snowmelt in the region. The food contracts for the districts were given out over the week prior, for a total of US$8,686 (equivalent to $201,528 in 2025) in cost.

Planning and development of Growden and Lake Sherman for use as both a summer and winter recreation area for the National Forest continued, with the Growden Dam planned as a 25 ft (7.6 m) tall and 250 ft (76 m) long construction made with enrollee labor. Additional work in the San Poil area included the construction of an outdoor kitchen site at the Swan Lake campground south of Republic, in conjunction with improvements to Scatter Creek Road leading up to the Swan, Ferry, and Long Lakes area.

On October 1, The director of the CCC announced that the organization would be recruiting 100,000 enrollees that fall to bring the western camps, including Growden, back to full capacity. Manpower loss was attributed to men reaching the end of enrollment tenures, dropout rates, and movement to the regular workforces outside the CCC. Due to ongoing wildfires in Oregon, the fall enrollee redistribution across the Northwest CCC camps was delayed. Trains scheduled to take men eastwards were delayed by a week, and the replacements for Growden, first listed as coming from Corps 7 headquartered in Omaha, were included in the delays. A group of 135 enrollees from Growden finally shipped out of Spokane on trains eastward bound Oct 6 for redeployment in their home district or decommissioning. Replacements for the camps were now scheduled to arrive between Oct 10th and 20th from the Little Rock, Arkansas region. Other replacement men for the district were scheduled to arrive October 10 from Bismarck, North Dakota, with a group of them initially reported as Growden replacements. By Oct 14th the Fort Wright District Camps had enrollees from 12 different states placed in the various camps, with Arkansas men being confirmed to arrive in district for Growden on October 15. The Arkansan enrollees, Company 4799, first organized at Camp Pike in Little Rock, Arkansas and numbering 150 men, finally arrived in Growden Camp on Oct 29, filling the openings left by departures nearly a month earlier.

=== 1937 ===
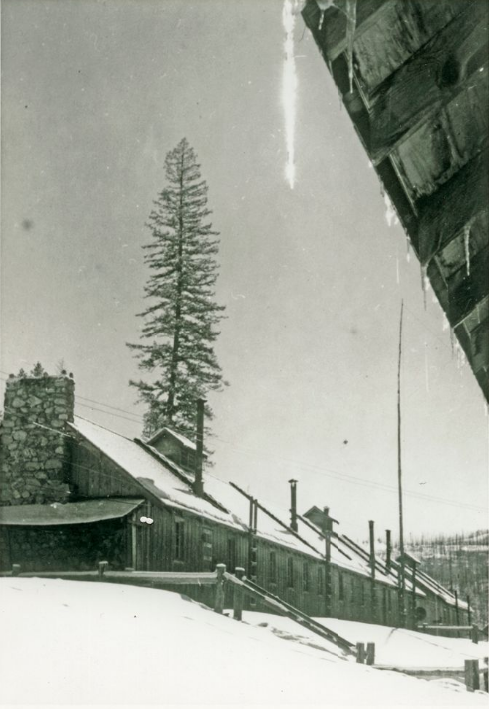
Camp Growden building in winter

By January enrollee attrition required the enlistment and arrival of new men in the Fort Wright District, including a group of 10 new Arkansas men to fill positions at Growden. With the end of the service term at the beginning of March, 86 of the Growden Arkansas men at were shipped eastwards via a Great Northern special leaving Meyers Falls for Spokane. The group returning to Little Rock included unfit workers, men not wanting another term, and men with a fully finished enrollment. Over the following month, as with other camps, Growden conducted preparations for the CCC's annual camp open house and anniversary banquet, which would happen on Sunday April 4.

In the first week of June, men from Camp Growden were called to help control a fire burning along Trout Creek 10 mi (16 km) north of Republic. The fire started June 3 in a dry area along the creek and was rapidly spread by strong gusty winds. By Saturday June 5 the fire had been contained within a fire line by 40 men from Camp Growden & Republic. The 40 acres (16 ha) fire was expected to burn itself out within the fire lines unless heavy wind gusts caused a jump of the fire lines. Over the next two months Growden men focused on the land clearing for the installation of telephone lines running between Tonasket and Kettle Falls with spur lines to each of the fire lookouts in the Kettles and Highlands. By July 30 a total of 600 mi (970 km) of telephone wire had been installed connecting the fire lookouts and the four radio broadcasting stations of the region. July 29 also saw the arrival of 15 new enrollees from Arkansas to replace men that had departed since the March unit swaps. Over the course of the year the enrollees finished the initial dam on Sherman Creek at 25 ft (7.6 m) tall by 150 ft (46 m) across the valley floor and topped with a 16 ft (4.9 m) wide access road. The filling of Sherman Lake was started. The company also completed 5 mi (8.0 km) of forest road along with maintaining and building trail, stock driveways, and bridges.

With the early fall arriving, early planning stages for the Fort Wright District were announced on September 9, with Camp Growden designated a winter camp location to stay open with a total of 22 camps open for winter. With two additional camps open for winter then open over the summer, enrollee shuffling and transitioning of the sites to winter programming or work was scheduled to start soon and be completed by late October. The incoming winter enrollees were first reported on October 2, with new of 426 men being transferred north from the Sacramento District in California. The group, composed of Missouri men, was set to be spread between Growden and Worley in Washington plus two of the Priest Lake area camps in Northern Idaho. Additionally, local recruiting of men was announced, with quotas of 12 junior enrollees from Stevens County and 2 from Ferry. The following week saw the majority of arrivals for the winter camps, with a total of 3780 men reported to be coming as of Monday October 11. Reporting with regards to the total, Sacramento men allocated to Growden confirmed 65 in total, but did not state where they were from. By Monday October 18 the number and origins of the incoming Growden enrollees was changed, with the total anticipated being updated to 130 Arkansas men due to arrive.

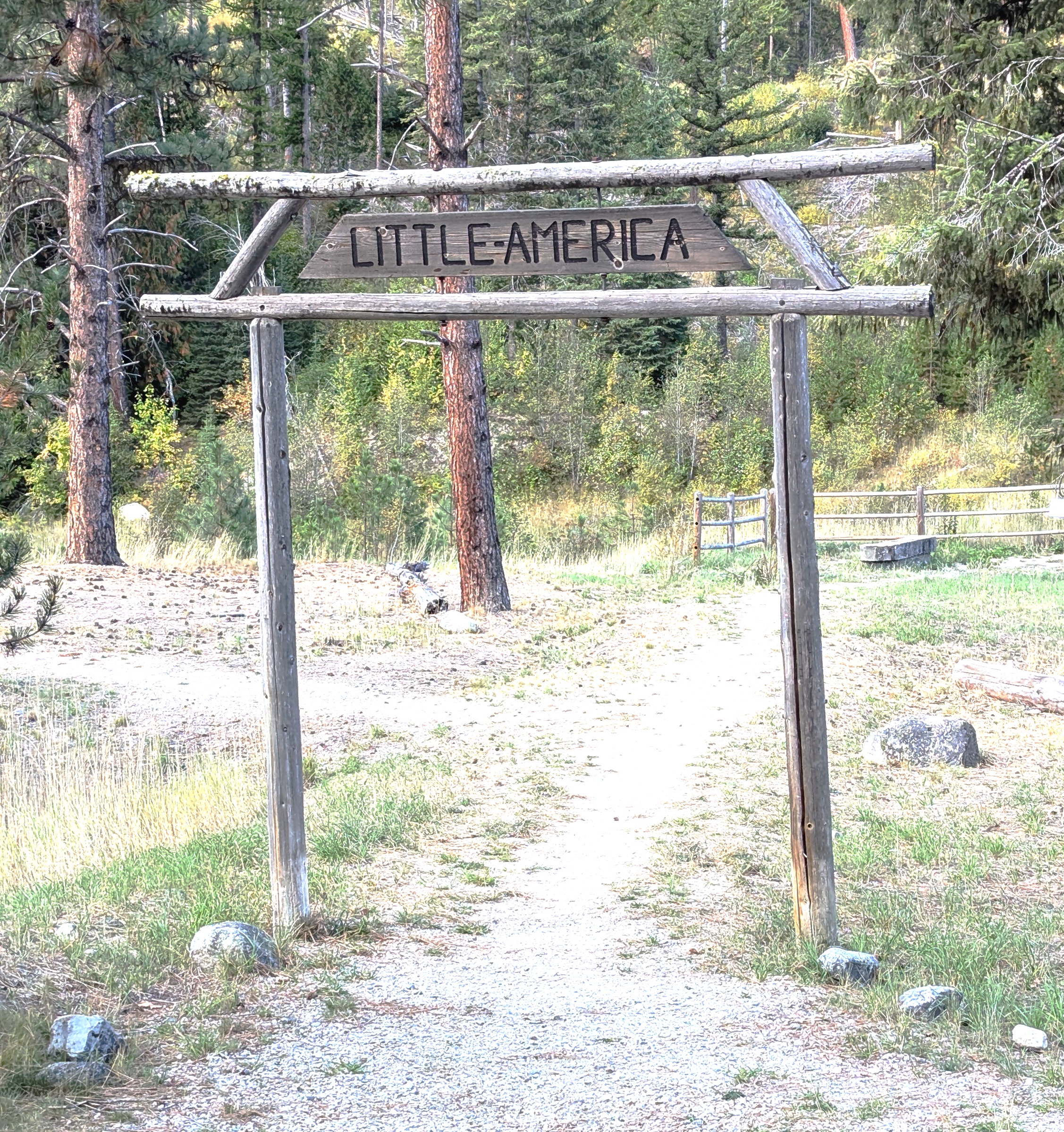
Little America entry arch

In late November, tensions between two Missouri 18-year-olds who arrived at Growden in July boiled over. Roscoe Drennen attacked William Johnson with a knife, dealing Johnson knife wounds to the chest and back. The resulting injuries were severe enough for Johnson's transport to the Forth Worth District military hospital in Spokane. As of December 6, one week later, Drennen had been arrested and was housed in the Republic city jail where he was to remain in custody while military and civil investigations were conducted and awaiting the condition updates of the Johnson. By December 12 of the next week, Drennen had pled guilty to second-degree assault in Ferry County Superior Court. Judge William C. Brown gave a sentence of no more than 10 years in the Washington State Reformatory.

=== 1938 ===
During the week of January 17, a series of camp management classes were held at Camp Seven Mile for 14 CCC officers. Lieutenant A. M. Steele was sent from Growden for the courses which covered camp management and 100–300 person mess hall detail.

It was announced on March 24 that 100 of the Arkansas and Missouri enrollees at Growden and the Republic spike camp would be included in the spring CCC discharge. On Friday the 25th the men were reported to travel east, leaving a small core of 30 men in Growden and 20 in the spike camp until summer replacements arrived. The anticipated transfer of men did not happen and as of June 18 the timeline was updated to have enrollee shuffling done by July 22. A troop from a Sixth Corps Area district was slated to fill the empty Growden beds. The summer replacement enrollee troops begin arriving in the district from eastern locations early July 15. Company 4602 was en route to Fort Wright from Camp McCoy in Wisconsin with an anticipated arrival of July 23. After arrival they were slated to travel on to Camp Growden.

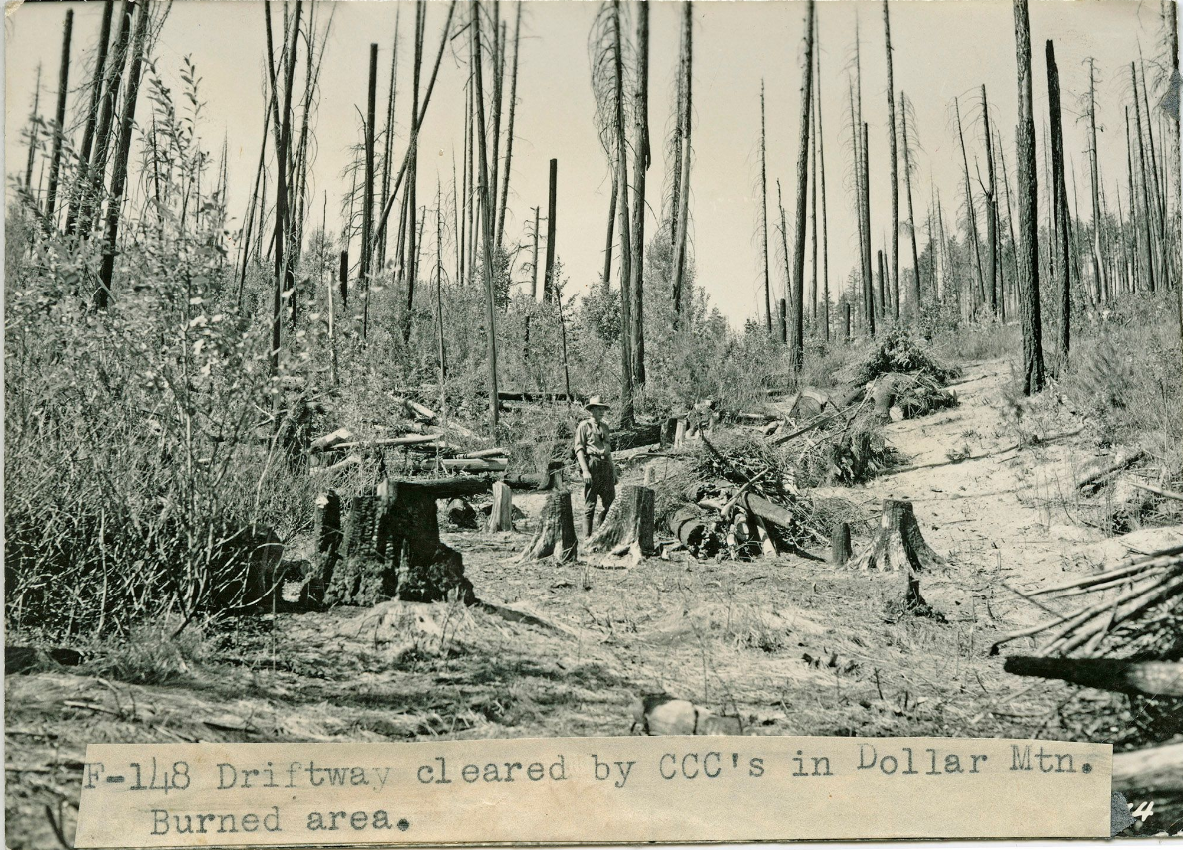
Growden workers clearing Dollar Mountain Fire snags, 1938

The company arrived a day early on July 22, and traveled onto Camp Growden, which by then was known in the district as "Little America". The first order included work repairs and refurbishment of the camp itself, it being in a state of disrepair after the departure of most of Company 4799 early in the spring. A large portion of the summer was spent on wildland fire activities, with a number of small fires contained and managed across the Colville forest lands. An additional fire lookout was completed as well, and hazard mitigation clearing was performed across swaths of the Dollar Mountain Fire scar. Year-round activity included road construction and betterment, telephone line installation and maintenance, and work on a new fire guard station building at Growden. Late season work by Growden enrollees included early December road and grounds improvements at Sweat Creek Campground west of Republic on Highway 20.

As the fall season started, replacement men for the district and Growden were organized at the eastern camps with a trio of special CCC-issue trains bringing the enrollees west. A train from Glenview, Illinois train was slated to bring 10 men for Growden after several stops in Montana. Later in the fall of 1938, special CCC enrollee-only passenger train runs out of Spokane for the Fort George Wright District were announced. The number of CCC enrollees heading east after finishing one or more enlistments that year was around 800, with 91 men all heading to the Chicago area from Camp Growden. The men were mostly taken to Camp Dix in New Jersey for discharge or reassignment, while replacement crews were expected to arrive at Fort Wright between January 10 and 20, 1939 to refill the camps across the district. Two enrollees on a furlough from Growden stole a car November 18 that they drove to Spokane for Thanksgiving week. While speeding on the return from Spokane, they proceeded to crash it through wire railing in Deer Park. They were arrested and held in the Stevens County jail in Colville on November 28. Ancillary winter preparation by the camp and county included the addition of a new snowplow for use on the Kettle Falls-Camp Growden road in the coming winters.

=== 1939 ===
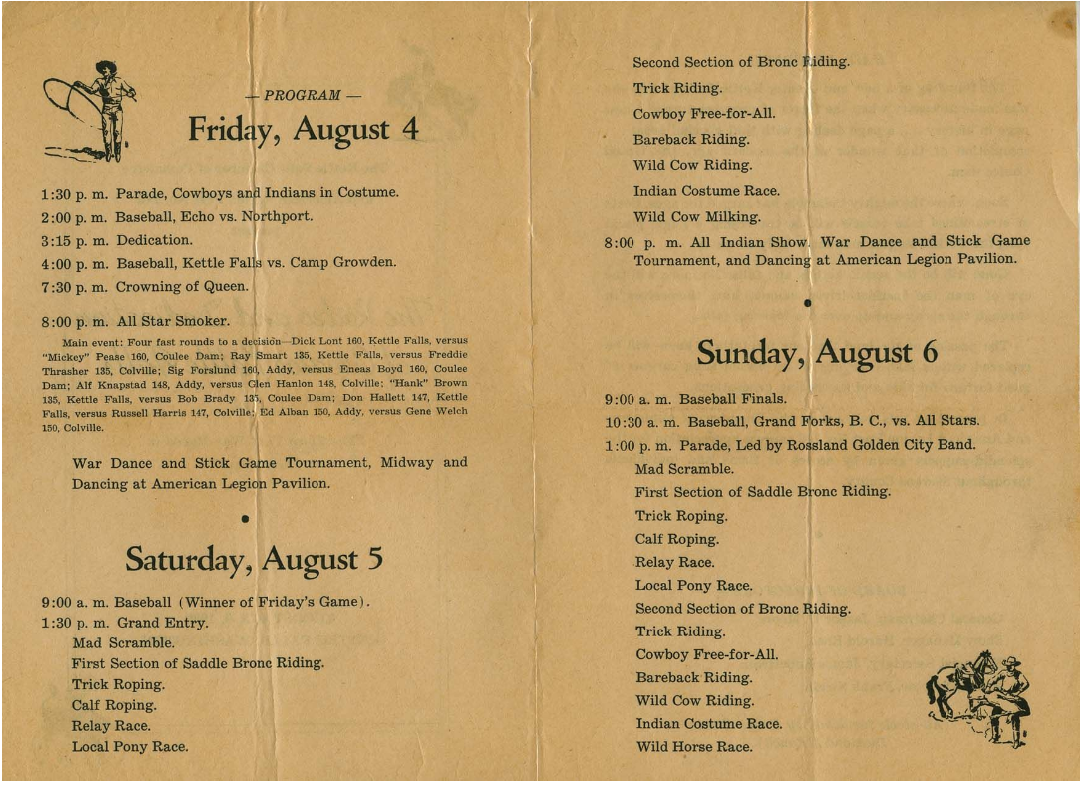
Greater Kettle Falls dedication and Baseball flyer

The Growden harmonica band was one of the invited musical groups who performed for the Stevens County Chamber of Commerce annual banquet and fundraiser on March 20. They played in rotation with the Colville High School Pep band and Trail, British Columbia Scottish bagpipers. In honor of the CCC's sixth anniversary on Wednesday April 5, each of the camps in the district had prepared an open house for the communities close to them. Camp Growden held its open house late in April on Sunday the 23rd. The open house was an anticipated local event in 1939 and many regional residents planned on making the drive to attend. Firefighting was again a major focus of the summer CCC man-hours with a total of 1217 man-days spend by Growden men by November. The efforts were spread across Colville National Forest lands and adjacent areas per camp foreman R.B. Moran.

In the early fall, the camp was subjected to press attention with the arrest of one of the camp cooks early in October. John Lattimer was detained while attempting to transport a large quantity of kitchen supplies into Stevens County. He pled guilty in Ferry County Superior Court to grand larceny and was sentenced by Judge William C. Brown to serve a term in the Washington State Reformatory. The holiday season for the camp was marred by the death of an enrollee on December 10. A truck full of men had driven into Colville to see the movie showing that night and there had been rain earlier in the evening darkening everything. As the truck approached the theater, it stopped and let off Ernest R. McDonald, of Yakima, who then started to cross the street. While crossing a car traveling at no more than 25 mph (40 km/h) hit him with its right front fender, tossing him into its windshield and then about 30 ft (9.1 m) from the impact spot. He died from the injuries sustained before reaching the hospital.

=== 1940 ===
A boxing exhibition and armature matches were held on Wednesday, February 14 in the Kettle Falls High School gym. In addition to the main event fight and a wrestling bout, three armature matches between Stevens County men and Growden enrollees were advertised. The semifinal smoker fight was held by the Colville Athletic Club at The Grove on Saturday March 2. Along with the headline match, a bout between a Growden enrollee and a local Colville man was announced. Sunday April 14 was Camp Growdens annual open house and CCC birthday celebration. The camp was open from 2–4 pm for Ferry and Stevens County residents, and they were given tours of the grounds and projects by enrollees. The spring work at Growden was focused around the reforesting of more land tracts burned by the Dollar Mountain Fire. By the completion of work on May 16, the Growden crew had planted an estimated 45,000 seedling Ponderosa pines according to the camp's principal foreman R. Moran.

Camp Lost Lake CCC near Bonaparte Lake was scouted and officially signed off on after the location was visited by a pair of CCC officers on April 8. Located at the base of Mount Bonaparte near the old 1933 Camp Leese site, the camp would be for summer occupation only and serve as a central location for works on national forest camps at Lost Lake and Bonaparte Lake plus road improvements, telephone line installation, and rangeland work. Improvements to the camp location, including construction of tent housing and a mess hall, were slated to start within 2 weeks of the announcement. The camp was staffed by late spring via the transfer of all Camp Growden personnel and enrollees, including the shift of much of Growden's equipment. With the opening of CCC Lost Lake, Growden saw its first idling since the spring of 1936.

=== 1941 ===
Construction of a fire line with associated Dollar Mountain Fire snag felling and deadwood slashing started January 1 and finished on March 5. The 255 acres (103 ha) parcel in the South Sherman Creek drainage was selected for having good soil to replant in. The parcel was planned to be burned in August and then stocked with 80,000 Ponderosa seedlings later. During that time a contingent of 50 enrollees arrived to fill out the company numbers on February 8 after working a stint at Camp Naches in the Yakima area.

On April 18 the camp hosted the annual open house, celebration for the CCC's 8th anniversary, and luncheon. Following years past, the CCC grounds were open for several hours to the public and enrollees gave tours talking about the work done. According to the tours, as of that spring, Growden men had lain 310 mi (500 km) of forest road, strung 251 mi (404 km) of telephone line, and constructed a number of buildings. In the forest, they had cleared 350 acres (140 ha) and planted over 333,000 tree seedlings along with surveying 119,613 acres (484.06 km^{2}) of land and spending 17,500 man days fighting wildfires. The building work they performed included nine new fire lookouts, ten houses or other dwellings, and 18 storage buildings.

With the increasing war preparation across the country, Army special enlistments from the CCC were occasionally taking place. Though most CCC enrollees were outside the enlistment age, by April 12 four men from Growden had been called up. A notable decline in enrollee numbers across the country, in response to wartime job creation, caused the CCC began to close camps in large numbers.

As had happened the year prior, the company was given orders and in spring moved to Camp Lost Lake, where they stayed until November when the camp there was closed. In late October word reached the Spokane area from Army Command that Camp Growden was being officially closed as a result of the increasing demand for emergency defense needs.

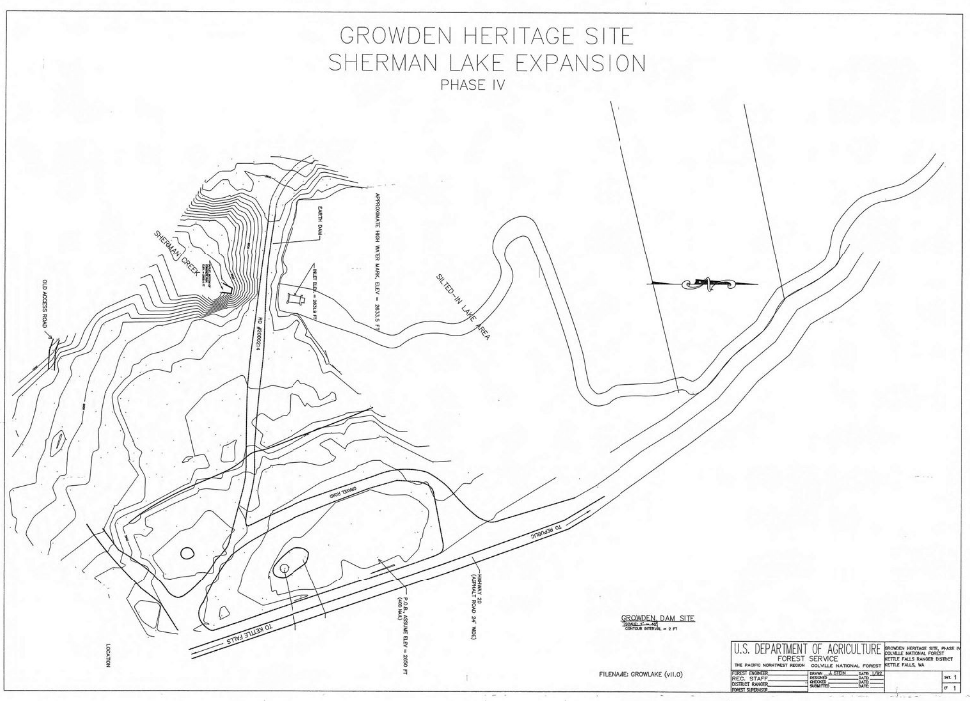
1992 planning map for current heritage site

== Camp Growden site post 1943 ==
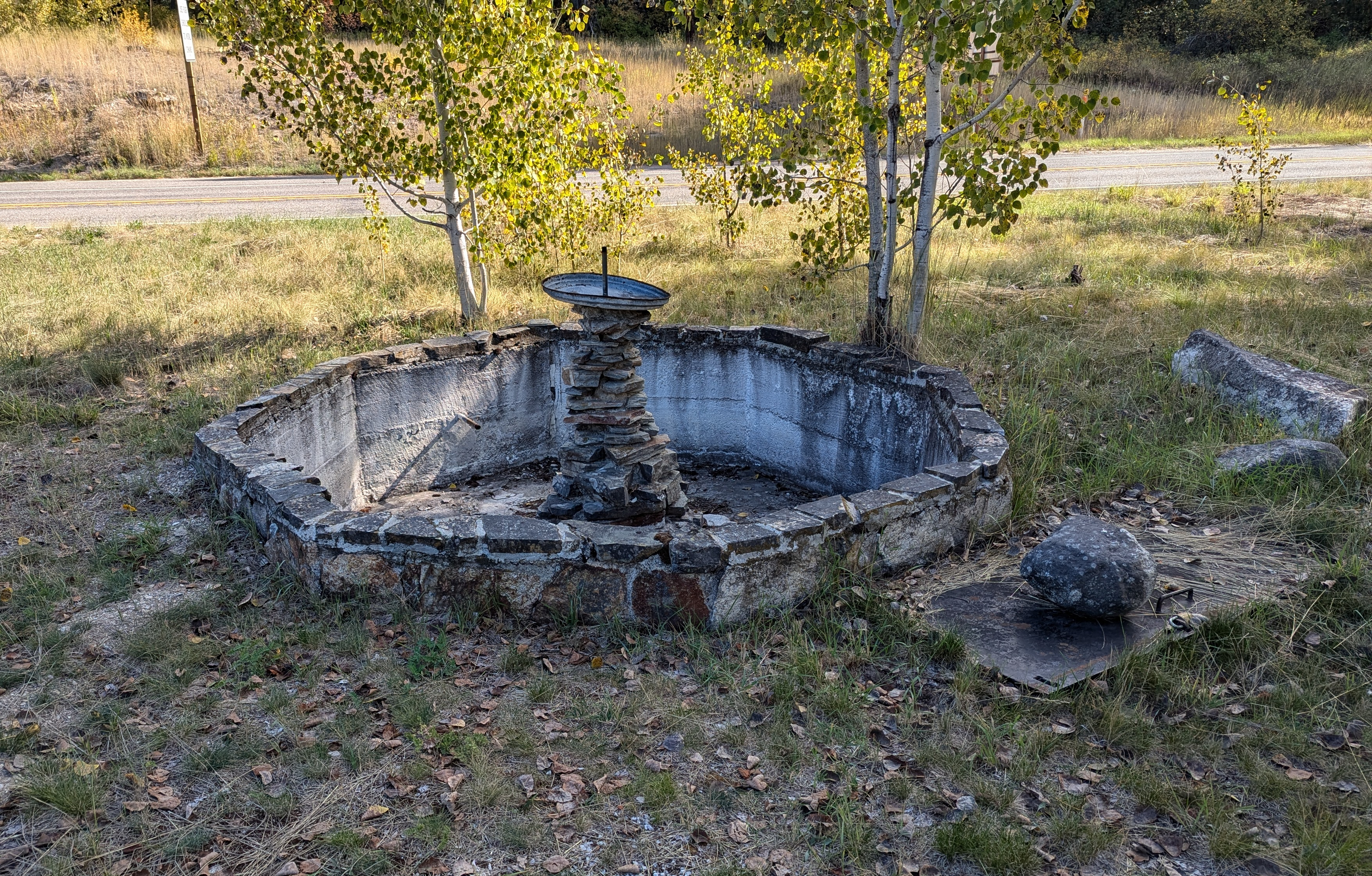
Camp Fountain, preserved but no longer running

After the CCC's end, the site was transitioned into the Growden Guard Station, part of the wildfire lookout tower and fire stations network for the Colville National Forest. The guard station housed firefighters during the summer fire season. Additionally the grounds were converted back into a national forest campground. By the 1980s, the Camp Growden site was listed as a site for the possible development of a cultural interpretive area and campground. Twenty seven visitors to Growden in 1991 were polled as to what the major reason was for stopping at the site. Of the five options provided, twelve people cited using the rest stop, while the options for "visit CCC" and "hunting/fishing" tied in second with 5 votes. The respondents were also asked what they considered the import aspect of the area improvement project under study at that point. The top options picked were "CCC history" at 14 votes and "Rest stop" at 8, while "lake enlargement" only received 3 votes. The forest service chose to implement the top two choices. The proposed pull off drive and horseshoe had been drafted by 1992 and the interpretive signage and site improvements had been completed by the mid-1990s. Estimates were generated in 1993 regarding the cost of dredging out the lake and returning it to a larger size similar to what it had been in the CCC plans. The cost for the work would have been US$1,886,400 (equivalent to $4,204,312 in 2025). After completion it was estimated that every decade it would need additional dredging, at around US$100,000 (equivalent to $222,875 in 2025) each time, to prevent the same infilling problem that swallowed Lake Sherman originally. With the price point for the initial project and need for continual maintenance, the forest service dropped consideration of lake restoration.

=== Lake Sherman and Growden Dam removal ===
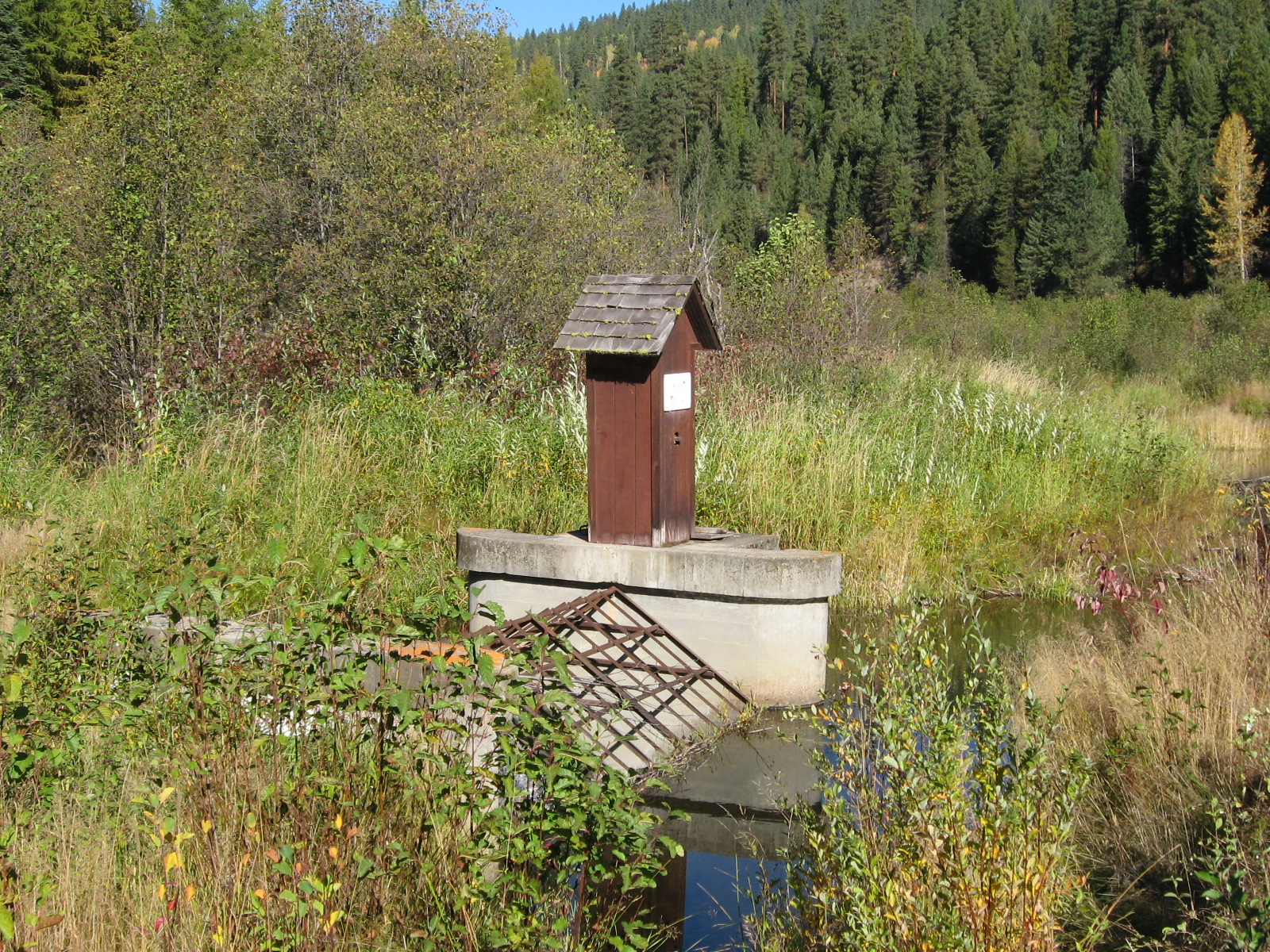
The nearly fully infilled Lake Sherman, 2006

==== Mounting problem ====
Responsibility for the maintenance and operation of Growden Dam was carried out by the Colville National Forest engineering staff. They kept plant growth on the dam sides contained, provided the yearly required safety inspections, and removed debris buildup from the outflow cage during any flooding events. In the early 1970s the earthen Groden Dam had been identified as problematic, harboring a high possibility of overtopping and washing away. Flow from the lake was metered by an outflow structure made of concrete and steel caging. The top was open with a cage cover, and the spillway was "L"-shape with a 16 ft (4.9 m) drop to the tunnel through the dam. During heavy flooding in 1998, the outlet cage became encrusted with branches and other flood debris, raising the level of Lake Growden to within 6 in (15 cm) of the dam top. A Forest Service crew cleared the cage structure in time to avert a dam breach.

Compounding the flow problem was the notedly rapid infilling of Sherman Lake itself with silt from the improvement and realignment of Washington State Route 20 crossing Sherman Pass in 1952–1954. In many places the road was placed across the stream or into the stream bed itself. Sherman Creek was straightened and realigned along the side of the new road bed leading to intense bank erosion through around 1961 when extensive erosional control measures were taken upstream of the Growden area. The rapid silting of Sherman Lake reduced it to a small pond area right at the dam itself and a meandering stream with depauperate wetlands behind. Loss of deep water behind the dam and having a top draining outflow are both noted as potential sources for stream warming below the dam, which combined with warm water inflowing at the confluence of Sherman Creek and South Sherman Creek. Healthy fish stream conditions include average stream temperatures staying below 16 °C (61 °F). While Sherman Creek was on average 15.5 °C (59.9 °F) above the lake, it was 18 °C (64 °F) just below and when South Sherman Creek joins the temperature reaches averages of 20 °C (68 °F).

==== Options ====
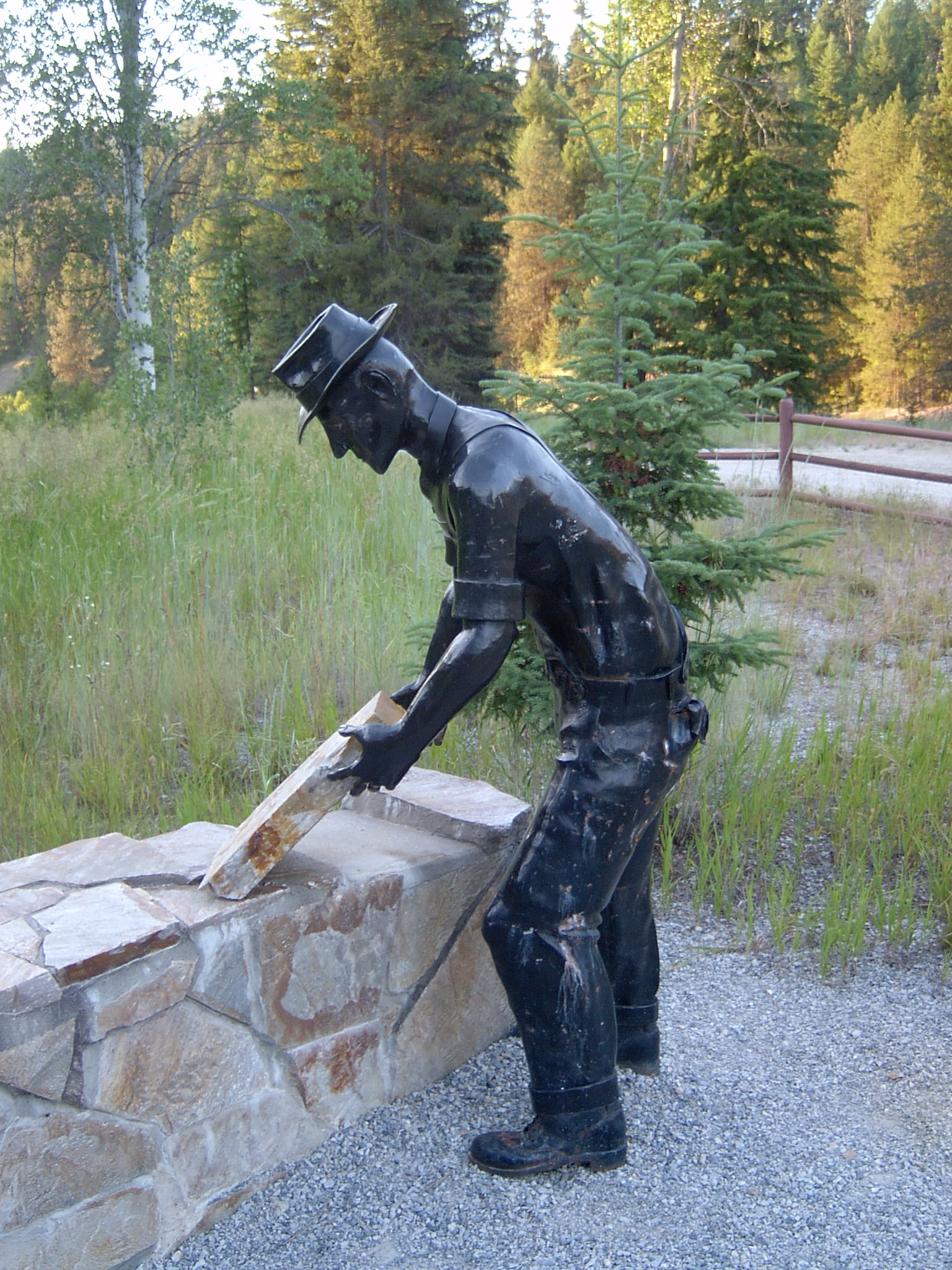
"Step into these shoes" memorial

In accordance with the National Environmental Policy Act and in response to the flooding plus fish habitat issues, a workshop was convened in 2002 to determine ways forward. With input from specialist experts and the general public, three alternative options were crafted along with the initial dam removal option, B, and given extra study.

Option A would have had no action taken at all, with the dam remaining and flooding checks made in emergencies. This option would not have addressed the structural liability of the dam during flooding, the sediment retention downstream, or the fish habitat, passage, and water temperature problems. Noxious weed checks and removal would have continued in the same manner as had already been happening.

Option B was the initially proposed option, which recommended Growden Dam to be partially been removed allowing a free-flowing Sherman Creek through its central opening. The stream would have been graded to pre-dam elevations through the site, passing through the damn itself at bed level. However, the north and south sections of the dam would not have been removed or impacted and would be components of the interpretive signage placed after restoration was completed. A 50 ft (15 m) wide stream area would have been constructed extending 1,400 ft (430 m) along the stream course, and several trout-suitable pools would have been included.

Option C was similar to Alternative A, being the least impactful of the options. It proposed that the wetlands behind the dam stayed and most of the dam as well, but an 8 ft (2.4 m) deep cut be made into the dam top to allow a "run of the river" water flow. The water table behind the dam would have lowered and a sloped stream bed would have been built against the outside of the dam through to the base of the existing water outlet structure creating an inclined rapids type area that ended at the junction with Lane Creek. This proposal would also have eliminated access to Forest Service Road 2000-214.

In option D the wetlands would have been preserved and a 15 ft (4.6 m) wide emergency spillway installed with an overflow chute 6 ft (1.8 m) below the dam top. Water passing through the 30 ft (9.1 m) long by 15 ft (4.6 m) wide chute would flow down the dam face and into the existing pool at its base. The spillways were to be constructed to meet the needs of a 500-year flooding event. With no wetlands loss, downstream bed rehabilitation would not be needed, but no fish passage structure would be constructed to increase habitat range.

An additional group of options were generated but for various reasons, not given extra study. Alternative E would have been very similar to B, however instead of full removal of the dam's center section, a culvert with a 30 ft (9.1 m) wide arch would have been installed through the dam, leaving the greater dam structure in place. It was deemed that the alteration of the dam would not have fully addressed the heritage needs, and would still have needed yearly maintenance. It would have also cost an additional US$243,000 (equivalent to $414,205 in 2025) over the estimate for Alternative B and so was dropped from consideration. Alternative F, cleaning the upstream area of woody debris that could damage the dam, was dropped as it would have not rectified the problems posed in a 500-year flooding event. It also would have violated laws against the removal of wood from stream courses resulting in fish habitat loss, and the dam itself would still block fish passage. Lastly, Alternate G would have added a spillway over the dam, but also an enlargement of Lake Sherman to a 6 acres (24,000 m^{2}) size via dredging. Not only did this option not rectify the water warming issue, but it had already been looked into a decade earlier. The cost of this proposal with the 10-year dredging maintenance, when examined in 1993, eliminated this as an option.

The option that was finally chosen was to follow option B, with a section of the dam fully removed and restoration of around 1.1 mi (1.8 km) of stream bottom to free-flowing stream.

==== Implementation ====
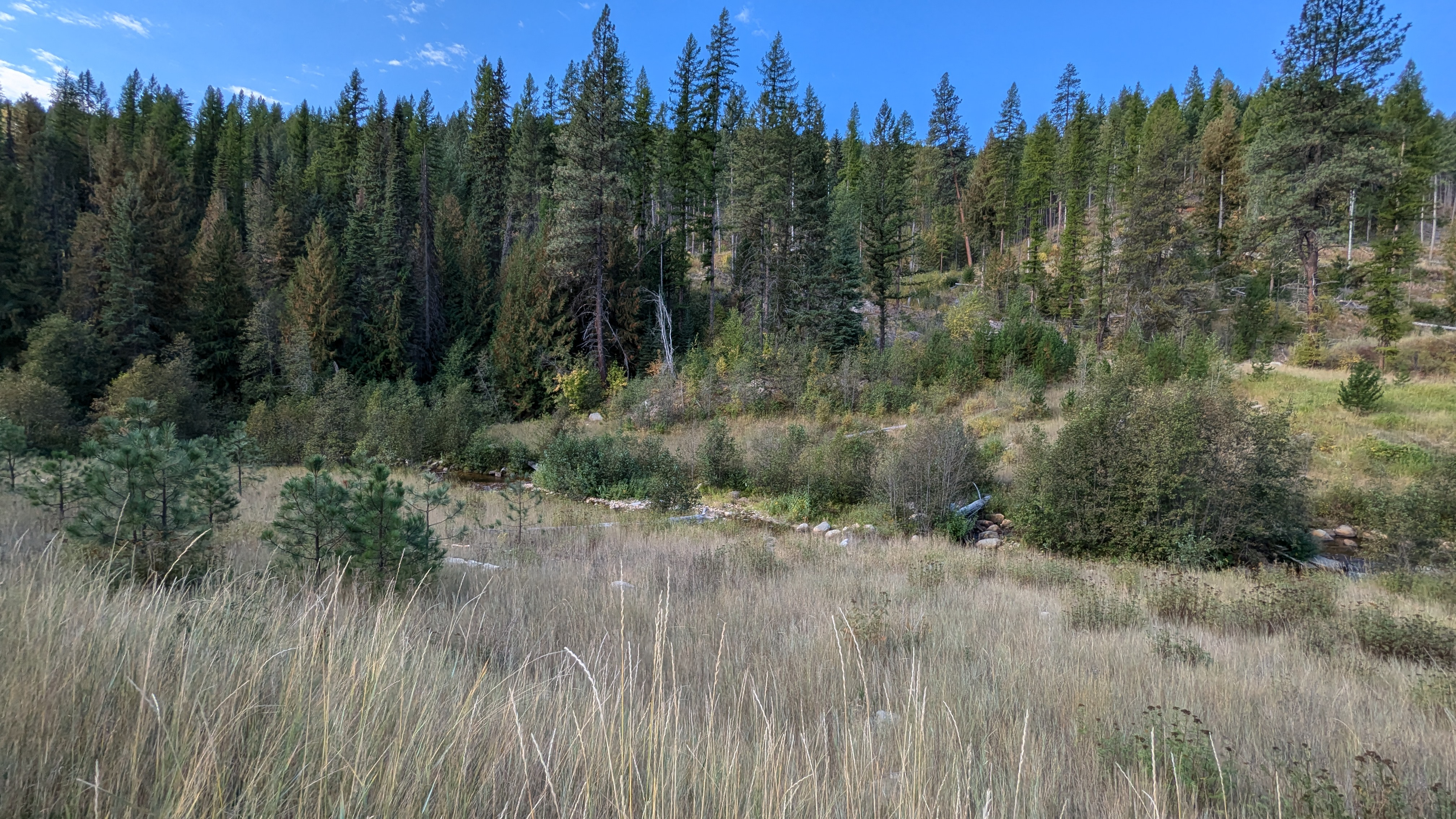
Restored Sherman Creek, September 2024

Beginning in June 2009 the Growden Heritage area was closed to the public to facilitate the reconstruction of a free-flowing Sherman Creek and removal of Growden Dam. Following the outline of Option B, Sherman Creek was temporarily rerouted around the work area and work was performed by United States Air Force reservists. Most of the manpower came through the Armed Forces Innovative Response Training, overseen by Chief Master Sergeant Ray Riel, and belonged to the United States Air Force "Red Horse" reservists. The work removed the main section of dam and stabilized the side areas for preservation while also grading down the infill sedimentation from behind the dam. The removal operations were eventually able to uncover the original valley bottom topography and stream bed where historic 1930s maps showed they should have been. The bed was rehabilitated and prepared for receiving Sherman Creek when it was returned to the stream bed. A small portion of Sherman Creek was officially returned to the rehabilitated stream course on Thursday, September 10, 2009, at 4:18pm with a small celebration attended by 35 people from the Colville National Forest, Ferry Conservation District, and US Air Force. The creek rejoined the main channel at the downstream end of the conservation project at 5:30pm. Work at the surrounding site continued the next year rehabilitating the flora with native species and upgrading the historic markers around the visitors' area.

=== Changing Room House rehabilitation ===
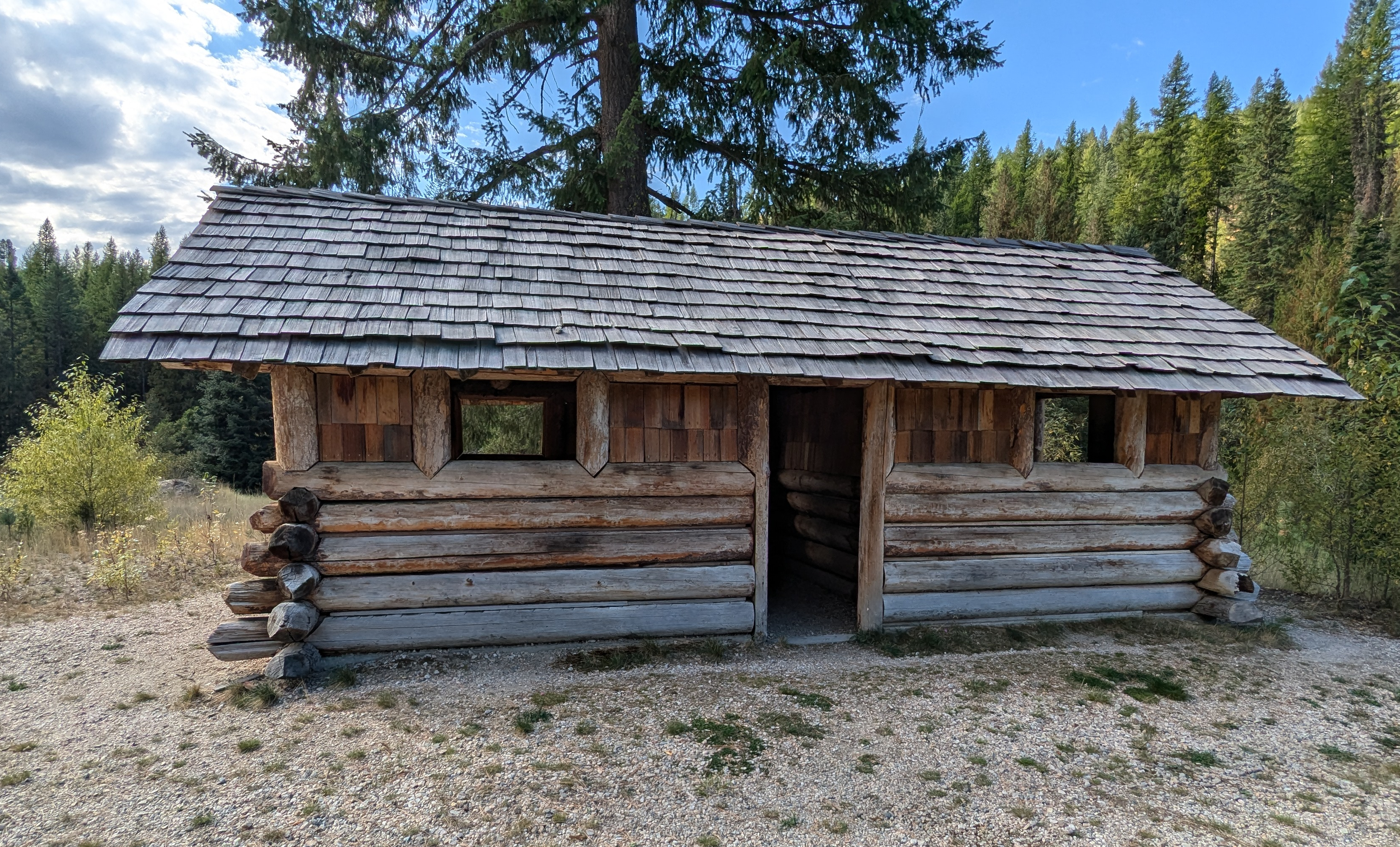
Refurbished and moved changing rooms building

By 2011 the only remaining building from Camp Growden was the changing room house. First built after completion of the Growden Dam, the building served as an outbuilding for the camp residents swimming in the newly filled Lake Sherman. It was intended to be part of the larger Sherman Lake Recreation Area which never fully materialized. The building was initially constructed from rough cut larch logs with a shingle roof. Sometime in the late 2000s to early 2010s a cottonwood fell into the building, damaging the building and going through the roof. During the summer of 2011, a group of volunteers overseen by the Colville National Forest archaeologist took around 3 weeks to disassemble, move, rehabilitate, and restore the building. The group cleared out pack rat nests, took apart the remains of the changing room and moved it to a more accessible location close to the pre-existing interpretive signage. The original components were checked for rot, stability, and usability, with replacements being substituted where needed. New pieces of the building were crafted utilizing the same techniques and tool types as would have been used by the original CCC builders to match the authenticity of the old and new areas. The roof supports and roof were all new construction made from young tresses and cedar shakes. Additional interpretive signage was planned for installation in 2012 to discuss the changing rooms, Growden Dam, and Lake Sherman.

== Growden Heritage Site ==
The site of Camp Growden is preserved as a free access Colville National Forest site of interest along the Sherman Pass Scenic Byway which was put in in the 1950s. Named the "Growden Heritage Site", the interpretive area is open from Memorial Day weekend through the end of October. The interpretive area has picnic tables, toilets, parking, plus day hiking. A 0.2 mi (320 m) paved trail with interpretive signage documents the history of camp Growden, Growden Dam, and Lake Sherman. Oversight of the heritage area falls under the control of Colville National Forests Three Rivers Ranger District. The district provide the regular site cleaning and maintenance. They also perform security patrols and do trail and road work as needed. The site no longer has camping areas as it did in the past, and the nearest national forest camp ground is east at the confluence of Canyon and Sherman Creeks.
