= Washington State Route 124 =

State highway in Walla Walla County, Washington, US

State Route 124

- Map of Walla Walla County in southeastern Washington with SR 124 highlighted in red

Route information
- Auxiliary route of US 12
- Maintained by WSDOT
- Length: 44.72 mi (71.97 km)
- Existed: 1964–present
- Tourist routes: Lewis and Clark Trail

Major junctions
- West end: US 12 in Burbank
- SR 125 near Prescott
- East end: US 12 in Waitsburg

Location
- Country: United States
- State: Washington
- Counties: Walla Walla

Highway system
- State highways in Washington; Interstate; US; State; Scenic; Pre-1964; 1964 renumbering; Former
← SR 123	→ SR 125

State Route 124 (SR 124) is a state highway in Walla Walla County, Washington, United States. It spans 45 miles (72 km) from Burbank in the west to Waitsburg in the east, intersecting U.S. Route 12 (US 12) at both ends. The highway generally follows the Snake and Touchet rivers and intersects SR 125 near Prescott.

SR 124 was previously part of two state highways: Secondary State Highway 3D (SSH 3D) from Burbank to Prescott, and SSH 3E from Prescott to Waitsburg. During the 1964 state highway renumbering, sections of both highways were formed to SR 124, which was officially named Ice Harbor Road and designated as a state scenic byway by the state legislature.

== Route description ==
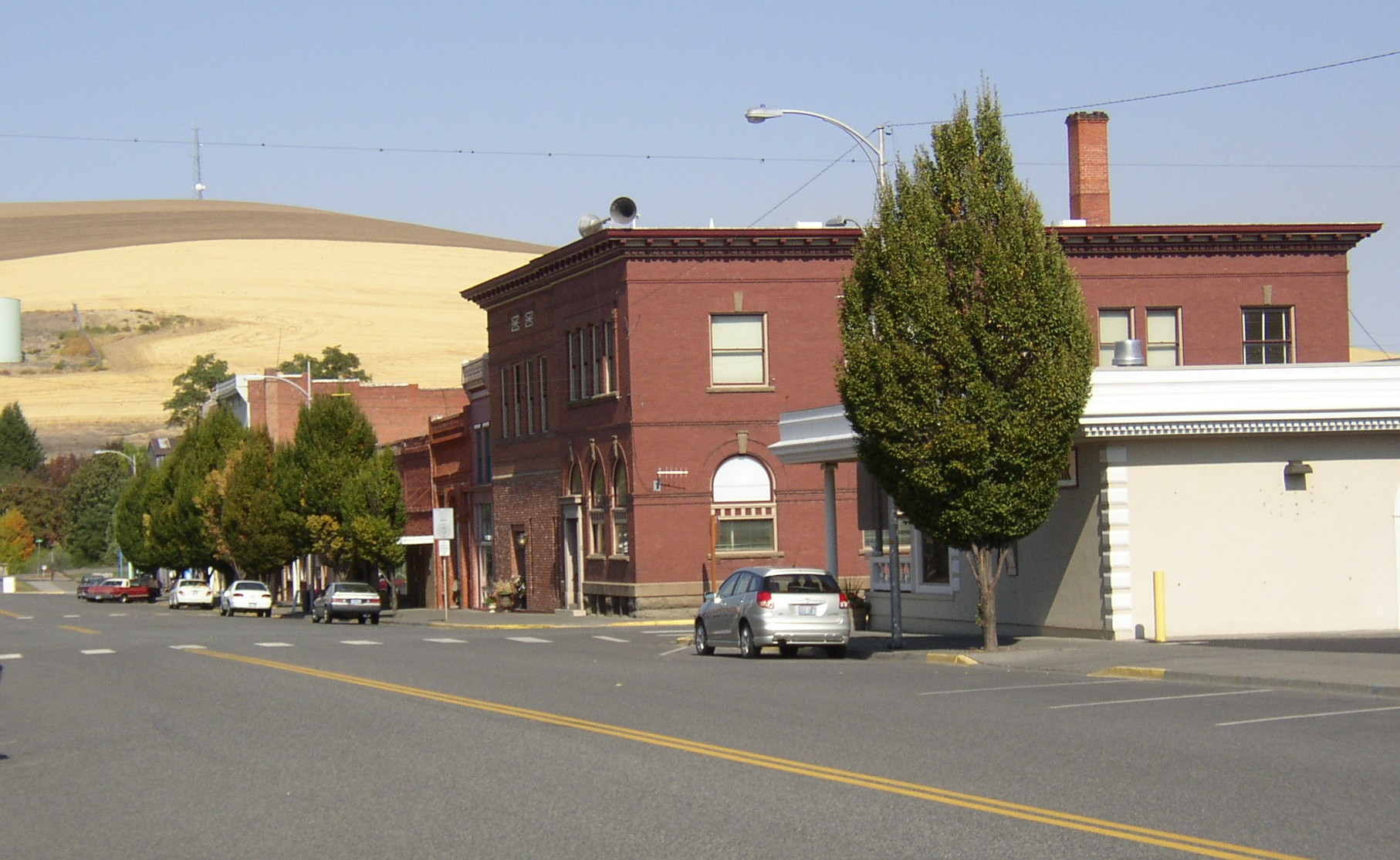
A section of SR 124 passing through downtown Waitsburg near its terminus with US 12

SR 124 begins at a dogbone interchange with US 12 in Burbank on the eastern shore of the Snake River near its confluence with the Columbia River in Pasco (part of the Tri-Cities). The highway travels east from the interchange onto Ice Harbor Drive after passing Hood Park on the shore of the Snake River and a local branch library. The two-lane road is rural with a speed limit of 60 miles per hour (97 km/h) as it passes north of the McNary National Wildlife Refuge. SR 124 dips northeast and crosses over a set of railroad tracks carrying the Ayer Subdivision of the Union Pacific Railroad north towards the Ice Harbor Lock and Dam.

The highway then turns northeast and ascends a ridge that overlooks the Snake River, which continues north while SR 124 travels east through the Eureka Flat. SR 124 descends into the Touchet River Valley below the rolling hills of the Palouse and follows the river east through Lamar and Harsha alongside an abandoned railroad grade. The highway crosses over Lyons Ferry Road with an overpass and intersects the north end of SR 125 on the outskirts of Prescott, approximately 18 miles (29 km) north of Walla Walla. SR 124 continues east through Prescott and turns southeast to follow the Columbia Walla Walla Railroad, a shortline railroad connecting Walla Walla to Dayton. At Bolles, the highway turns south to cross over the Touchet River and makes a gradual turn to the east as it approaches Waitsburg. SR 124 travels through the town on West 2nd Street and briefly turns south on Main Street before continuing east for one block on Preston Avenue to the highway's terminus at US 12. US 12 then continues east on Preston Avenue and beyond Waitsburg to Dayton and Clarkston.

SR 124 is maintained by the Washington State Department of Transportation (WSDOT) and designated as part of the Lewis and Clark Trail Scenic Byway, a state scenic byway. A short section of the highway in Burbank is also listed on the National Highway System. WSDOT conducts an annual survey of average traffic volume on the state highway system that is measured in terms of annual average daily traffic. Traffic volumes on SR 124 range from a minimum of 1,400 vehicles between Prescott and Boles to a maximum of 7,000 vehicles near Hood Park in Burbank.

== History ==
The shields of Secondary State Highway 3D (left) and Secondary State Highway 3E (right).

Most of the current route of SR 124 follows a portion of the Lewis and Clark Trail. The highway from Piper Canyon Road to Waitsburg follows a small section of the route that Lewis and Clark took from Fort Clatsop in May 1806 before splitting in Montana. SR 124 became a state highway during the 1964 highway renumbering, in which the Washington State Department of Transportation (WSDOT) replaced the old system (Primary and Secondary Highways) with a new system (State Routes), which is still in use today. In the Primary and Secondary system, SR 124 from US 12 to SR 125 (then US 410) was Secondary State Highway 3D and SR 124 from SR 125 to SR 126 was Secondary State Highway 3E.

Secondary State Highway 3D (SSH 3D) was added in 1937, during the creation of the Primary State Highway system. The original route started at US 410 in Touchet and went north to Eureka and east to SSH 3E west of Prescott. Later in 1951, SSH 3D was moved to a route from US 410 in Burbank to SSH 3E, the current route of SR 124 and in 1965, the route from Burbank to Ice Harbor Road was designated the Ice Harbor Drive. SSH 3E was also added in 1937 and went from US 410 in Walla Walla north to SSH 3D and east past Prescott to Waitsburg. SSH 3E became SR 125 from Walla Walla to SSH 3D and SR 124 from SSH 3D to Waitsburg.

Before and after the establishment, the route of SR 124 has gone through several documented WSDOT construction projects from 1941 to 2004. Many were small, minor projects including repavings and intersection improvements. The first was a construction project that constructed SSH 3E from SSH 3D to Waitsburg, which took place in 1941. The latest project was a realignment project along SR 124 east of Burbank. The project straightened a curve along the highway. It cost $145,589 USD and took place in 2004.

A $22 million interchange with US 12 was completed in May 2012 to replace the intersection in Burbank that marks the western terminus of SR 124. The intersection, along with a nearby junction with Humorist Road that was replaced with an overpass, had been the sites of several fatal collisions that killed five people in the late 2000s. A railroad crossing south of the Ice Harbor Dam was replaced in October 2017 with an overpass that cost $11 million to construct and realigned a dangerous intersection with a nearby road.

== Major intersections ==
The entire highway is in Walla Walla County.

Location	mi	km	Destinations	Notes
Burbank	0.00	0.00	US 12 – Pasco, Walla Walla	Interchange
	34.65	55.76	SR 125 south – Walla Walla	
Waitsburg	44.72	71.97	US 12 – Walla Walla, Lewiston	
1.000 mi = 1.609 km; 1.000 km = 0.621 mi
