= Washington State Route 125 =

State highway in Walla Walla County, Washington, US

State Route 125
- A map of the Walla Walla area with SR 125 highlighted in red

Route information
- Auxiliary route of US 12
- Maintained by WSDOT
- Length: 23.65 mi (38.06 km)
- Existed: 1964–present

Major junctions
- South end: OR 11 near College Place
- North end: SR 124 near Prescott

Location
- Country: United States
- State: Washington
- Counties: Walla Walla

Highway system
- State highways in Washington; Interstate; US; State; Scenic; Pre-1964; 1964 renumbering; Former
← SR 124	→ SR 127

State Route 125 (SR 125) is a state highway in Walla Walla County, Washington, United States. It travels 24 miles (39 km) south from the city of Walla Walla to the Oregon state border and north to a junction with SR 124 near Prescott. The highway continues south towards Pendleton, Oregon, as OR 11. SR 125 also has a spur route in Walla Walla that connects it to an interchange with U.S. Route 12 (US 12).

SR 125 follows a historic wagon road, the Mullan Road, and several railroads that were built in the late 19th century. The road from the Oregon border to Walla Walla was added to the state highway system in 1923 as a branch of State Road 3 (later US 410), while the remainder of the highway from Walla Walla to Prescott was designated as part of Secondary State Highway 3E in 1937. The two highways were combined to form SR 125 during the 1964 state highway renumbering.

The Oregon–Walla Walla highway was originally a two-lane road that was the site of hundreds of collisions in the 1960s, prompting the state government to consider new designs. After proposals to build a bypass to carry SR 125 around Walla Walla were shelved, the state began construction of a four-lane divided highway in 1987. It was completed the following year and improved with traffic signals in the late 1990s.

== Route description ==
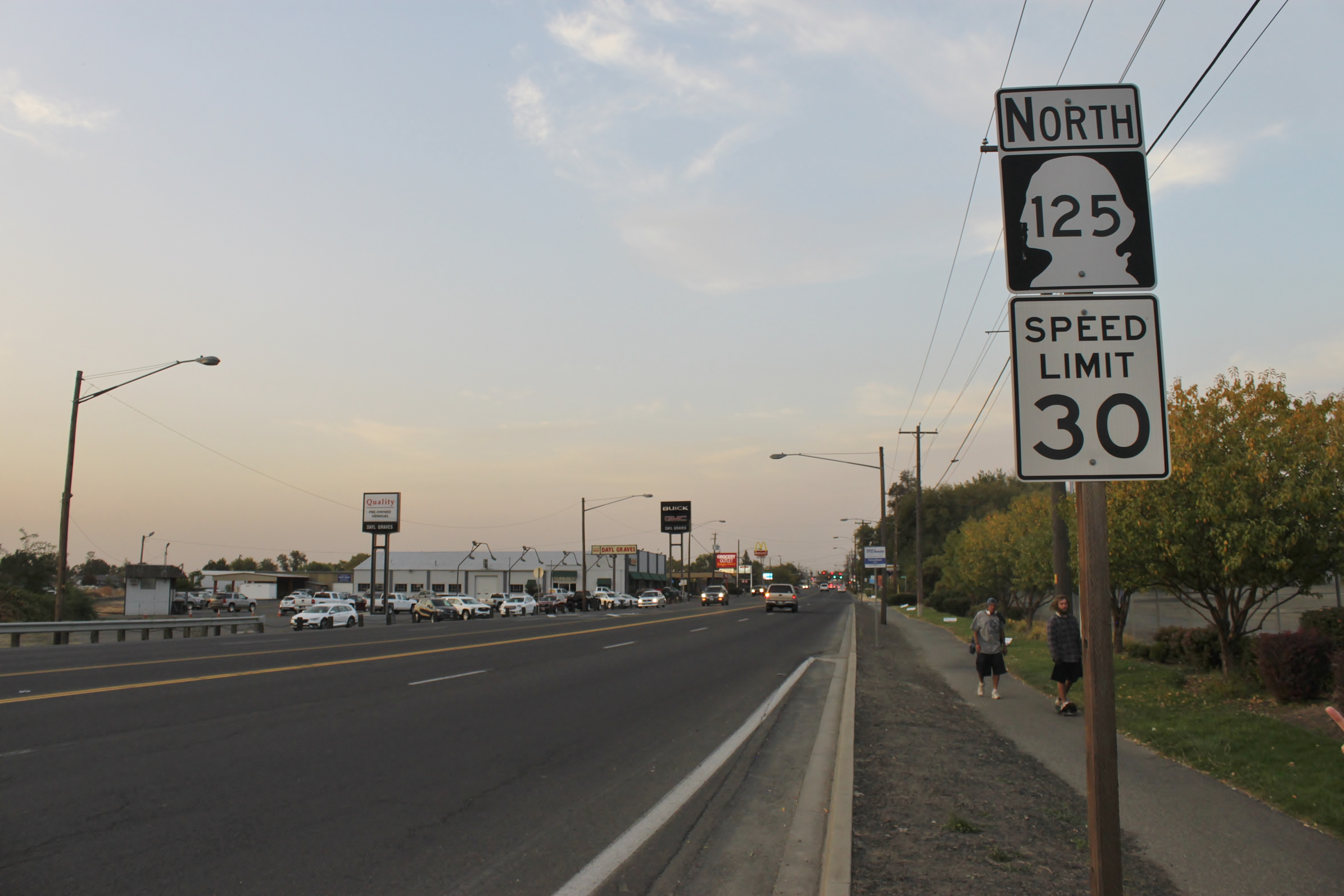
A section of SR 125 near downtown Walla Walla

SR 125 begins at the Oregon–Washington state border as an extension of Oregon Route 11, which continues south to Milton-Freewater and a junction with Interstate 84 in Pendleton. The four-lane divided highway carrying SR 125 follows the Walla Walla River downstream as it travels north through a collection of wineries in a flat section of rural Walla Walla County. After intersecting the Old Milton Highway, SR 125 veers northeast into suburban College Place and passes Fort Walla Walla Park as it follows Stone Creek through residential neighborhoods. The highway loses its raised concrete median after entering the city of Walla Walla and intersecting Plaza Way near the Walla Walla County Fairgrounds. SR 125 then turns north onto 9th Avenue and crosses over a railroad carrying a branch of the Union Pacific Railroad.

The highway passes through a commercial district west of downtown Walla Walla on 9th Avenue and crosses over Mill Creek before turning west onto Pine Street. SR 125 travels parallel to U.S. Route 12 (US 12) on Pine Street for four blocks, crossing under a railroad viaduct in the process, before turning north onto 13th Avenue and passing under US 12. Pine Street continues west as a spur route that connects directly to US 12 at an interchange with Myra Road. SR 125 continues north through an industrial area with several railroad crossings and warehouses to the Washington State Penitentiary. The two-lane highway serves the main entrance of the penitentiary and travels along its eastern and northern boundary before leaving Walla Walla city limits.

SR 125 begins its ascent from the Walla Walla Valley into the hilly Palouse near Valley Grove and begins following the Columbia Walla Walla Railroad, a shortline railroad connecting Walla Walla to Dayton. The highway and railroad travel northwest along the floor of Spring Valley, making several turns as they pass through the rural communities of Hadley, Berryman, and Ennis. SR 125 then turns northeast near Dry Creek and descends from the hills to reach a bridge crossing the Touchet River. The highway terminates beyond the bridge at a junction with SR 124, located west of Prescott.

SR 125 is maintained by the Washington State Department of Transportation (WSDOT). The Oregon–Walla Walla section of the highway is designated as a Highway of Statewide Significance and as part of the National Highway System. WSDOT conducts an annual survey of average traffic volume on the state highway system that is measured in terms of annual average daily traffic. Daily traffic volumes on SR 125 range from a minimum of 430 vehicles near its northern terminus in Prescott to a maximum of 21,000 vehicles near Fort Walla Walla Park.

== History ==
The shield of SSH 3E, one of two predecessor highways that formed SR 125

SR 125 follows a section of the Mullan Road, the first American wagon road constructed in the Pacific Northwest. It was built by the U.S. military in the early 1860s and connected Fort Walla Walla to Fort Benton in Montana, following Spring Valley towards modern-day Prescott and continuing north to Spokane and east across the Idaho Panhandle. The Mullan Road, itself a part of the Fort Colville Military Road, was the primary means of overland transport from Walla Walla until the completion of the Walla Walla and Columbia River Railroad in 1875. The railroad, which later came under the ownership of the Oregon Railroad and Navigation Company (OR&N), was joined by a southern branch built in 1883 to connect Walla Walla and Milton, Oregon.

The OR&N Company also built a northern branch in 1881 along the Mullan Road from Walla Walla to Prescott (named for a railroad official) and Waitsburg. A second north–south railroad between Walla Walla and Milton was built in 1907 to the west for interurban service, operated by the Walla Walla Valley Railway until it was converted to freight use in 1931. The existing roads from Milton-Freewater to Prescott were improved and partially paved at the behest of Good Roads Movement promoters and automobile clubs. By the early 1920s, the Walla Walla–Milton section was part of two signed auto trails: the Theodore Roosevelt International Highway and the California-Banff Bee Line. This section was also incorporated into the Washington state highway system in 1923 as a branch of the Inland Empire Highway (numbered State Road 3 and U.S. Route 410).

State Road 3 was replaced in 1937 by Primary State Highway 3 (PSH 3) in a major reorganization of the state highway system that also added suffixed secondary routes. The unpaved Walla Walla–Prescott road was assigned the designation of Secondary State Highway 3E (SSH 3E), which continued east from Prescott to Waitsburg. SSH 3E was fully paved by the mid-1940s and sections were rebuilt and realigned in 1955 after floods damaged the road. The Walla Walla city government suggested several unmade changes to SSH 3E in the 1950s and 1960s, including rerouting of its approach to the city to use North 9th Avenue, and a western bypass to directly link to the Milton-Freewater Highway in College Place.

During the 1964 state highway renumbering, SSH 3E was split between two new state routes: SR 124, which would be combined SSH 3D to form a continuous route from Burbank to Waitsburg, and SR 125, which would use the PSH 3 branch to the Oregon state line and the remainder of SSH 3E. During the routing debate for Interstate 82 in the late 1960s, the SR 125 and OR 11 corridor was considered as a potential option, but was rejected in favor of the Umatilla Bridge compromise. The state governments of Oregon and Washington began considering expansion and modernization of the two-lane highway carrying SR 125 and OR 11 in the mid-1960s, following over 400 collisions and 15 deaths in less than a decade.

The four-lane limited-access highway with a wide median and signalized intersections would also include a western bypass of downtown Walla Walla for SR 125 and a direct connection to a proposed east–west freeway carrying US 12 (the successor to both US 410 and PSH 3). Three principal routes were presented for public consideration in 1967, each with varying levels of opposition due to potential costs, impacts to homes and businesses, and the taking of protected lands near Fort Walla Walla Park. The rejection of several new options presented by the state highway department contributed to the project being delayed into the mid-1970s, along with inflation and the ongoing oil crisis. The US 12 freeway was completed in October 1973 without a direct connection to SR 125, which would use the 13th Avenue underpass.

The state legislature delayed funding for the SR 125 project while the new state department of transportation re-evaluated the Fort Walla Walla Park plan. An abridged version of the project, consisting solely of the four-lane highway expansion without the western bypass, was approved for construction in 1985 and its $4.2 million cost was fully funded using a new state gas tax. Construction began in August 1987 to build the divided highway, which would smooth out curves, include a frontage road, and use a concrete median barrier instead of a center turn lane like the expanded OR 11. The four-lane, six-mile (9.7 km) section of SR 125 was completed and opened to traffic in August 1988.

The widening project did not relieve the highway of major collisions, however, due to the merging of traffic from side streets into the fast-moving mainline lanes with a posted speed limit of 55 miles per hour (89 km/h). The state government approved $2.3 million to equip five intersections with traffic signals in 1999 due to increased traffic and development along SR 125. The western bypass was ultimately built by the College Place city government in November 2008 as an extension of Myra Road, which was connected to US 12 with a new interchange that opened in 2010. The intersection of SR 125 and Plaza Way is the busiest in the Walla Walla area and was replaced by a roundabout in August 2021 to improve traffic flow and safety.

== Spur route ==
State Route 125 Spur
- Location: Walla Walla, Washington
- Length: 0.73 mi (1,170 m)
- Existed: 1990–present

SR 125 has a short spur route in Walla Walla that connects the mainline to an interchange with US 12. The spur route travels west for 0.73 miles (1.17 km) along Pine Street from SR 125 at 13th Avenue to a roundabout with Myra Road, where it turns north and terminates at a dogbone interchange with US 12. An estimated 4,600 vehicles use the spur route on a daily basis, based on average daily traffic volumes calculated by WSDOT.

The spur route was established in 1990, providing a direct connection from mainline SR 125 to US 12. The original intersection with US 12 at Myra Road was replaced by an interchange that opened on July 23, 2010. The new interchange extended the length of SR 125 Spur from 0.67 miles (1.08 km) to its present 0.73 miles (1.17 km).

== Major intersections ==
The entire highway is in Walla Walla County.

Location	mi	km	Destinations	Notes
	0.00	0.00	OR 11 south – Pendleton	Southern terminus, continuation into Oregon
Walla Walla	6.08	9.78	SR 125 Spur (Pine Street) to US 12 – Pasco, Lewiston	
Walla Walla	6.70	10.78	Washington State Penitentiary	
	23.65	38.06	SR 124 – Pasco, Waitsburg	
1.000 mi = 1.609 km; 1.000 km = 0.621 mi
