= 1964 state highway renumbering (Washington) =

Highway renumbering in Washington

- 1964 state highway renumbering

Highway names
- Interstates: Interstate X (I-X)
- US Highways: U.S. Route X (US X)
- State: State Route X (SR x)

System links
- State highways in Washington; Interstate; US; State; Scenic; Pre-1964; 1964 renumbering; Former

The 1964 state highway renumbering was a reorganization of state highways in the U.S. state of Washington. The new system, based on sign routes (SR, later changed to state routes), replaced the primary and secondary highway system implemented in 1937. It was first signed in January 1964 and codified into the Revised Code of Washington in 1970.

== History ==
The former numbering system of primary and secondary state highways, using lettered suffixes and unnamed branches, created confusion for motorists as the system expanded. The system also ignored, or conflicted with, the federal highway system and the then-developing Interstate Highway System. The state highway department originally planned for a major highway renumbering in 1957, expanding on the existing primary and secondary system with numbers as high as 59, but serious consideration of a full-scale renumbering began in 1962. It had the specific goal of replacing letter suffixes with two- and three-digit numbers, which would not repeat or conflict with each other or with federal route numbers.

In 1963, the Washington State Legislature passed a law authorizing the creation of a new state highway numbering system under the direction of the Washington State Highway Commission. The law came in response to confusion experienced by tourists visiting during the 1962 World's Fair, held in Seattle. The highway commission approved its numbering plan on June 19, 1963, using even numbers for east–west routes and odd numbers for north–south routes; primary routes would have lower numbers, while secondary routes would use the first digit to indicate its parent route. Federal highways, including Interstate highways, would retain their designations and be incorporated into the system. The new numbering system took effect on January 15, 1964, and new signs were posted at a cost of $115,000.

== Route renumbering ==
=== New Sign Route numbers ===
This article is part of the highway renumbering series.
Alabama	1928, 1957
Arkansas	1926
California	1964
Colorado	1953, 1968
Connecticut	1932, 1963
Florida	1945
Indiana	1926
Iowa	1926, 1969
Louisiana	1955
Maine	1933
Massachusetts	1933
Minnesota	1934
Missouri	1926
Montana	1932
Nebraska	1926
Nevada	1976
New Jersey	1927, 1953
New Mexico	1926, 1988
New York	1927, 1930
North Carolina	1934, 1937, 1940, 1961
North Dakota	1926
Ohio	1923, 1927, 1962
Pennsylvania	1928, 1961
Puerto Rico	1953
South Carolina	1928, 1937
South Dakota	1927, 1975
Tennessee	1983
Texas	1939, 1990
Utah	1962, 1977
Virginia	1923, 1928, 1933, 1940, 1958
Washington	1964
Wisconsin	1926
Wyoming	1927

New number	Section	Old number	Notes
SR 2	I-5 in Everett to US 97 in Peshastin	PSH 15	
SR 2	US 97 in Peshastin to I-90 in Spokane	PSH 2	
SR 2	I-90 in Spokane to US 395 in Mead	PSH 3	
SR 2	US 395 in Mead to Idaho state line	PSH 6	
SR 3	US 101 in Shelton to SR 106 in Belfair	SSH 14A	
SR 3	SR 106 in Belfair to SR 104 at the Hood Canal Bridge	PSH 21	
SR 5	entire route	PSH 1	
SR 6	entire route	PSH 12	
SR 7	entire route	PSH 5	
SR 8	entire route	PSH 9	
SR 9	entire route	SSH 1A	
SR 10	US 99 in Seattle to US 97 in Teanaway	PSH 2	U.S. Route 10 was truncated to Coeur d'Alene, Idaho, in 1971. SR 10 from Cle Elum to Ellensburg still remains as a state highway. SR 90 (I-90) was also renumbered from the same Primary State Highways (see below).
SR 10	US 97 in Teanaway to I-82 in Ellensburg	PSH 3	U.S. Route 10 was truncated to Coeur d'Alene, Idaho, in 1971. SR 10 from Cle Elum to Ellensburg still remains as a state highway. SR 90 (I-90) was also renumbered from the same Primary State Highways (see below).
SR 10	I-82 in Ellensburg to SR 281 in Burke	PSH 7	U.S. Route 10 was truncated to Coeur d'Alene, Idaho, in 1971. SR 10 from Cle Elum to Ellensburg still remains as a state highway. SR 90 (I-90) was also renumbered from the same Primary State Highways (see below).
SR 10	SR 281 in Burke to US 395 in Ritzville	PSH 18	U.S. Route 10 was truncated to Coeur d'Alene, Idaho, in 1971. SR 10 from Cle Elum to Ellensburg still remains as a state highway. SR 90 (I-90) was also renumbered from the same Primary State Highways (see below).
SR 10	US 395 in Ritzville to US 2 in Spokane	PSH 11	U.S. Route 10 was truncated to Coeur d'Alene, Idaho, in 1971. SR 10 from Cle Elum to Ellensburg still remains as a state highway. SR 90 (I-90) was also renumbered from the same Primary State Highways (see below).
SR 10	US 2 in Spokane to Idaho state line	PSH 2	U.S. Route 10 was truncated to Coeur d'Alene, Idaho, in 1971. SR 10 from Cle Elum to Ellensburg still remains as a state highway. SR 90 (I-90) was also renumbered from the same Primary State Highways (see below).
SR 11	entire route	PSH 1	
SR 12	entire route	PSH 8	In 1967, U.S. Route 12 was extended into Washington. At that time, SR 14 was renumbered as a portion of US/SR 12, and SR 12 was renumbered as a portion of current SR 14.
SR 14	entire route	PSH 5	In 1967, U.S. Route 12 was extended into Washington. At that time, SR 14 was renumbered as a portion of US/SR 12, and SR 12 was renumbered as a portion of current SR 14.
SR 16	entire route	PSH 14	
SR 17	US 395 in Eltopia to SR 28 in Soap Lake	SSH 11G	
SR 17	SR 28 in Soap Lake to US 2 in Coulee City	PSH 7	
SR 17	US 2 in Coulee City to US 97 near Brewster	PSH 10	
SR 18	entire route	PSH 2	
SR 20	entire route	PSH 16	Extended in 1973
SR 21	US 395 near Lind to US 2 in Wilbur	SSH 4B	
SR 21	US 2 in Wilbur to SR 30 in Republic	PSH 4	
SR 21	SR 30 in Republic to Canadian border	SSH 4A	
SR 22	US 410 in Buena to US 97 in Toppenish	PSH 8	
SR 22	US 97 in Toppenish to US 410 in Prosser	SSH 3A	
SR 23	US 195 in Steptoe to I-90 in Sprague	PSH 18	
SR 23	I-90 in Sprague to SR 28 in Harrington	SSH 11F	
SR 24	entire route	SSH 11A	
SR 25	entire route	PSH 22	
SR 26	I-90 in Vantage to SR 261 in Washtucna	SSH 7C	
SR 26	SR 261 in Washtucna to US 295 in Dusty	SSH 11B	
SR 27	US 195 in Pullman to SR 271 in Oakesdale	PSH 3	
SR 27	SR 271 in Oakesdale to I-90 in Opportunity	SSH 3H	
SR 28	US 2 in East Wenatchee to SR 281 in Quincy	PSH 10	
SR 28	SR 281 in Quincy to US 2 in Davenport	PSH 7	
SR 30	US 97 in Tonasket to SR 21 in Republic	PSH 4	Renumbered in 1973 as a portion of SR 20
SR 30	SR 21 near Republic to US 395 near Kettle Falls	SSH 3P	Renumbered in 1973 as a portion of SR 20
SR 31	entire route	PSH 6	SR 31 was truncated to Tiger in 1973. The portion south of Tiger was renumbered as a portion of SR 20.
SR 82	entire route	PSH 3	
SR 90	I-5 in Seattle to US 97 in Teanaway	PSH 2	Interstate 90 was still under construction in 1964. While it was under construction, the Primary State Highway numbers listed referred to both the old alignment (US 10), and the new alignment (I-90).
SR 90	US 97 in Teanaway to I-82 in Ellensburg	PSH 3	Interstate 90 was still under construction in 1964. While it was under construction, the Primary State Highway numbers listed referred to both the old alignment (US 10), and the new alignment (I-90).
SR 90	I-82 in Ellensburg to SR 281 in George	PSH 7	Interstate 90 was still under construction in 1964. While it was under construction, the Primary State Highway numbers listed referred to both the old alignment (US 10), and the new alignment (I-90).
SR 90	SR 281 in George to US 395 in Ritzville	PSH 18	Interstate 90 was still under construction in 1964. While it was under construction, the Primary State Highway numbers listed referred to both the old alignment (US 10), and the new alignment (I-90).
SR 90	US 395 in Ritzville to US 2 in Spokane	PSH 11	Interstate 90 was still under construction in 1964. While it was under construction, the Primary State Highway numbers listed referred to both the old alignment (US 10), and the new alignment (I-90).
SR 90	US 2 in Spokane to Idaho state line	PSH 2	Interstate 90 was still under construction in 1964. While it was under construction, the Primary State Highway numbers listed referred to both the old alignment (US 10), and the new alignment (I-90).
SR 92	entire route	SSH 15A	
SR 95	entire route	PSH 3	In the mid-1970s, US 95 was rerouted to no longer serve the state of Washington. The segment in Washington was renumbered as US 195 Spur and a portion of U.S. Route 195.
SR 97	Oregon state line to SR 22 in Toppenish	PSH 8	Concurrencies with SR 90 and SR 2 are skipped in this list.
SR 97	SR 22 in Toppenish to I-82 in Union Gap	SSH 3A	Concurrencies with SR 90 and SR 2 are skipped in this list.
SR 97	I-82 in Union Gap to I-90 in Ellensburg	PSH 3	Concurrencies with SR 90 and SR 2 are skipped in this list.
SR 97	I-90 in Teanaway to US 2 in Peshastin	PSH 2	Concurrencies with SR 90 and SR 2 are skipped in this list.
SR 97	US 2 in Wenatchee to British Columbia, Canada border	PSH 10	Concurrencies with SR 90 and SR 2 are skipped in this list.
SR 99	entire route	PSH 1	US 99 was deleted in 1969. A portion of SR 99 remains as a state highway from Fife to Everett.
SR 99 Alt	entire route	SSH 1B	Renumbered SR 539 in 1969
SR 99 Temp	entire route	PSH 1	This was a temporary state highway designation for West Marginal Way while the West Marginal Way Freeway was under construction in the 1960s. The West Marginal Way Freeway is now a portion of SR 99. West Marginal Way is no longer a state highway.
SR 101	Oregon state line to SR 6 in Raymond	PSH 12	
SR 101	SR 6 in Raymond to US 410 in Aberdeen	PSH 13	
SR 101	US 410 in Aberdeen to I-5 in Tumwater	PSH 9	
SR 103	entire route	SSH 12A	
SR 104	US 101 in Discovery Bay to SR 3 at the Hood Canal Bridge	SSH 9E	
SR 104	SR 3 at the Hood Canal Bridge to the Kingston ferry	PSH 21	
SR 104	Edmonds ferry to I-5 at the King-Snohomish county line	SSH 1W	
SR 104	I-5 at the King-Snohomish county line to SR 522 in Lake Forest Park	SSH 2B	
SR 105	entire route	SSH 13A	
SR 106	entire route	PSH 21	
SR 107	entire route	PSH 9	
SR 108	entire route	SSH 9D	
SR 109	entire route	SSH 9C	
SR 111	entire route	SSH 9G	Removed from state highway system in 1971
SR 112	entire route	SSH 9A	
SR 113	US 101 in Discovery Bay to the Port Townsend ferry	PSH 9	SR 113 was renumbered as a portion of SR 20 in 1973. An unrelated road was designated SR 113 in 1992.
SR 113	Keystone ferry to SR 525 on Whidbey Island	SSH 1D	SR 113 was renumbered as a portion of SR 20 in 1973. An unrelated road was designated SR 113 in 1992.
SR 120	entire route	SSH 8B	SR 120 was renumbered as SR 140 in 1967, and was removed from state highway system in 1992
SR 121	entire route	SSH 8D	SR 121 was renumbered as SR 141 in 1967. SR 801 was renumbered as a new SR 121 at the same time.
SR 122	entire route	SSH 8E	SR 122 was renumbered as SR 142 in 1967. An unrelated road was designated SR 122 in 1992.
SR 124	US 395 in Burbank to SR 125 near Prescott	SSH 3D	
SR 124	SR 125 near Presoctt to US 410 in Waitsburg	SSH 3E	
SR 125	Oregon state line to US 410 in Walla Walla	PSH 3	
SR 125	US 410 in Walla Walla to SR 124 near Prescott	SSH 3E	
SR 126	entire route	SSH 3L	Removed from state highway system in 1992
SR 128	entire route	SSH 3K	
SR 129	entire route	PSH 3	
SR 131	entire route	SSH 2I	SR 131 was renumbered in 1975 as a portion of US 97. An unrelated road was designated SR 131 in 1992.
SR 141	entire route	SSH 5L	SR 141 was dropped from the state highway system in 1967, and the designation was reapplied to former SR 121.
SR 143	entire route	PSH 5	SR 143 was renumbered as SR 123 in 1967. An unrelated road was designated SR 143 from 1973 to 1985.
SR 150	entire route	SSH 10C	
SR 151	entire route	SSH 10D	The SR 151 designation was deleted in 1987, the roadway having become a portion of US 97 and an eastern extension of SR 150.
SR 153	entire route	PSH 16	
SR 155	US 2 in Coulee City to the Grand Coulee Dam	SSH 2F	
SR 155	Grand Coulee Dam to US 97 in Omak	SSH 10A	
SR 160	entire route	PSH 14	
SR 161	Eatonville to SR 512 in South Hill	SSH 5N	
SR 161	SR 512 in South Hill to US 410 in Puyallup	SSH 5G	
SR 161	US 410 in Puyallup to I-5 near Auburn	SSH 5D	
SR 162	entire route	SSH 5E	
SR 163	entire route	PSH 5	SR 163 was renumbered as a portion of SR 167 in 1969. An unrelated road was designated SR 163 in 1992.
SR 165	entire route	PSH 5	
SR 167	entire route	PSH 5	
SR 168	entire route	PSH 5	The Naches Pass Highway has been part of the state highway system since 1943, and was numbered SR 168 in 1964, but has yet to be constructed.
SR 169	entire route	PSH 5	
SR 171	entire route	SSH 7E	
SR 172	entire route	SSH 10B	
SR 173	entire route	PSH 10	
SR 174	SR 17 in Leahy to SR 155 in Grand Coulee	SSH 10B	
SR 174	SR 155 in Grand Coulee to SR 21 near Wilbur	SSH 4C	
SR 181	SR 18 in Auburn to US 99 in Duwamish	SSH 2M	
SR 181	US 99 in Duwamish to SR 900 in South Seattle	PSH 1	
SR 195	entire route	PSH 3	
SR 202	entire route	PSH 15	In 1970, SR 202 was renumbered as a portion of SR 522. SR 522 from Woodinville to North Bend was renumbered as the new SR 202.
SR 203	entire route	SSH 15B	
SR 204	entire route	SSH 15A	
SR 205	entire route	PSH 1	
SR 207	US 2 near Winton to SR 209 at Lake Wenatchee State Park	SSH 15C	The portion of SR 207 north of Lake Wenatchee was dropped from the state highway system in 1992.
SR 207	SR 209 at Lake Wenatchee State Park to Telma	SSH 15D	The portion of SR 207 north of Lake Wenatchee was dropped from the state highway system in 1992.
SR 209	entire route	SSH 15C	Removed from state highway system in 1992
SR 220	entire route	SSH 3B	Dropped from the state highway system in 1992
SR 221	entire route	PSH 8	
SR 223	entire route	SSH 3T	
SR 224	entire route	SSH 3R	
SR 230	entire route	PSH 18	
SR 231	I-90 in Sprague to US 2 in Reardan	SSH 2G	
SR 231	US 2 in Reardan to US 395 in Chewelah	SSH 3J	
SR 240	SR 24 in Cold Creek to SR 224 in Richland	SSH 11C	
SR 240	SR 224 in Richland to US 410 in Richland	SSH 3R	
SR 243	entire route	SSH 7C	
SR 251	entire route	SSH 22A	Removed from the state highway system in 1983
SR 260	SR 17 near Mesa to US 395 in Connell	SSH 11A	
SR 260	US 395 in Connell to SR 26 in Washtucna	SSH 11B	
SR 261	US 410 in Delaney to SR 26 near Washtucna	SSH 11B	
SR 261	SR 26 near Washtucna to I-90 in Ritzville	SSH 11E	
SR 270	entire route	PSH 3	
SR 271	entire route	PSH 3	
SR 272	US 195 in Colfax to SR 27 in Palouse	SSH 3F	
SR 272	SR 27 in Palouse to Idaho state line	PSH 3	
SR 274	entire route	SSH 3H	
SR 281	entire route	PSH 7	
SR 281 Spur	entire route	PSH 18	
SR 282	entire route	SSH 11G	
SR 283	entire route	PSH 7	
SR 290	entire route	SSH 2H	
SR 291	entire route	SSH 3S	
SR 292	entire route	SSH 3J	
SR 294	entire route	SSH 6A	Renumbered in 1970 as a portion of SR 20
SR 295	entire route	PSH 3	In 1970, US 295 was dropped from the U.S. Highway System, and was renumbered SR 127. In 1979, the section from Dusty to Colfax was renumbered from SR 127 to a portion of SR 26.
SR 300	entire route	SSH 21C	
SR 302	entire route	SSH 14A	
SR 303	SR 304 in Bremerton to Keyport	SSH 21B	
SR 303	Keyport to SR 3	PSH 21	
SR 304	entire route	PSH 21	
SR 305	entire route	SSH 21A	
SR 306	entire route	SSH 21B	Removed from the state highway system in 1992
SR 311	entire route	SSH 6B	
SR 395	Oregon state line to US 410 in Pasco	PSH 3	Concurrencies with SR 90 and SR 2 are skipped in this list.
SR 395	US 410 in Pasco to I-90 in Ritzville	PSH 11	Concurrencies with SR 90 and SR 2 are skipped in this list.
SR 395	US 2 in Mead to British Columbia, Canada border	PSH 3	Concurrencies with SR 90 and SR 2 are skipped in this list.
SR 401	entire route	SSH 12B	
SR 402	entire route	SSH 12G	The proposed SSH 12-G / SR 402 highway from Grays River to Pe Ell was never built, and was dropped from the state highway system in 1971.
SR 403	entire route	SSH 12C	Removed from the state highway system in 1992
SR 405	entire route	PSH 1	I-405 was signed as a state highway until it was improved to Interstate Highway standards in 1970-71.
SR 407	entire route	SSH 12D	Dropped from the state highway system in 1992
SR 409	entire route	SSH 12F	
SR 410	US 101 in Aberdeen to US 101 at Mud Bay	PSH 9	In 1967, US 410 was dropped from the U.S. Highway System, and became US 12, except from Elma to Naches. From Elma to Mud Bay, SR 410 was renumbered SR 8. From Mud Bay to Tacoma, the designation was removed from concurrencies with US 101 and I-5/US 99 (this section is skipped in this list). From Tacoma to Naches, the highway remained numbered SR 410. In 1973, the section of SR 410 from Tacoma to Sumner was renumbered as a portion of SR 167.
SR 410	I-5 in Tacoma to I-82 in Yakima	PSH 5	In 1967, US 410 was dropped from the U.S. Highway System, and became US 12, except from Elma to Naches. From Elma to Mud Bay, SR 410 was renumbered SR 8. From Mud Bay to Tacoma, the designation was removed from concurrencies with US 101 and I-5/US 99 (this section is skipped in this list). From Tacoma to Naches, the highway remained numbered SR 410. In 1973, the section of SR 410 from Tacoma to Sumner was renumbered as a portion of SR 167.
SR 410	I-82 in Union Gap to Idaho state line	PSH 3	In 1967, US 410 was dropped from the U.S. Highway System, and became US 12, except from Elma to Naches. From Elma to Mud Bay, SR 410 was renumbered SR 8. From Mud Bay to Tacoma, the designation was removed from concurrencies with US 101 and I-5/US 99 (this section is skipped in this list). From Tacoma to Naches, the highway remained numbered SR 410. In 1973, the section of SR 410 from Tacoma to Sumner was renumbered as a portion of SR 167.
SR 411	entire route	SSH 12H	
SR 500	entire route	SSH 8A	
SR 501	entire route	SSH 1T	
SR 502	entire route	SSH 1S	
SR 503	SR 500 in Orchards to SR 502 in Battle Ground	SSH 1U	
SR 503	SR 502 in Battleground to I-5 in Woodland	SSH 1S	
SR 504	entire route	SSH 1R	
SR 505	entire route	SSH 1Q	
SR 506	entire route	SSH 1P	
SR 507	I-5 in Centralia to Tenino	SSH 1N	
SR 507	Tenino to SR 7 in Roy	SSH 5H	
SR 508	entire route	SSH 5K	
SR 509	I-5 in Tacoma to SR 516 in Des Moines	SSH 1V	
SR 509	SR 516 in Des Moines to US 99 at the Duwamish River	SSH 1K	
SR 510	entire route	SSH 5I	
SR 512	entire route	SSH 5G	
SR 513	entire route	SSH 1J	The portion of SR 513 south of SR 520 was dropped from the state highway system in 1971. The portion north of NE 65th Street in Seattle was dropped in 1992.
SR 514	entire route	SSH 1X	Dropped from the state highway system in 1992
SR 515	entire route	SSH 5C	
SR 516	SR 509 in Des Moines to I-5 in Midway	SSH 1K	
SR 516	I-5 in Midway to SR 169 in Summit	SSH 5A	
SR 518	entire route	SSH 1L	
SR 520	entire route	PSH 1	
SR 522	entire route	PSH 2	In 1970, SR 522 east of Bothell was renumbered as SR 202, and old SR 202 from Bothell to Monroe became a portion of SR 522.
SR 524	entire route	SSH 1W	
SR 525	US 99 in Martha Lake to Mukilteo ferry	SSH 1I	
SR 525	Clinton ferry to SR 536 near Anacortes	SSH 1D	
SR 526	entire route	SSH 1I	
SR 527	entire route	SSH 2J	
SR 528	entire route	PSH 1	
SR 530	entire route	SSH 1E	
SR 532	entire route	SSH 1Y	
SR 534	entire route	SSH 1H	
SR 536	entire route	PSH 1	In 1973, the portion of SR 536 west of its current western terminus in Fredonia was renumbered as a portion of SR 20.
SR 537	entire route	SSH 1C	In 1975, SR 537 was renumbered SR 237. In 1992, it was dropped from the state highway system.
SR 538	entire route	SSH 1G	
SR 540	entire route	SSH 1Z	Dropped from the state highway system in 1992.
SR 542	entire route	PSH 1	
SR 543	entire route	PSH 1	
SR 544	entire route	SSH 1A	
SR 546	entire route	SSH 1B	
SR 603	entire route	SSH 12E	In 1992, SR 603 north of Winlock was dropped from the state highway system. SR 603 south of Winlock was renumbered as a portion of SR 505.
SR 702	entire route	SSH 5J	
SR 706	entire route	PSH 5	
SR 801	entire route	SSH 1M	In 1967, SR 801 was renumbered as SR 121. Although SR 121 still exists, the section that had been SR 801 was dropped from the state highway system in 1992.
SR 830	US 101 in Johnsons Landing to I-5 in Kelso	PSH 12	In 1968, US 830 was dropped from the U.S. Highway system. The portion west of I-5 was renumbered as SR 4; the portion east of I-5 was renumbered as a portion of SR 14.
SR 830	I-5 in Vancouver to US 97 in Maryhill	PSH 8	In 1968, US 830 was dropped from the U.S. Highway system. The portion west of I-5 was renumbered as SR 4; the portion east of I-5 was renumbered as a portion of SR 14.
SR 831	entire route	PSH 12	In 1968, SRs 831, 832, and 833 were renumbered SRs 431, 432, and 433 respectively.
SR 832	entire route	PSH 12	In 1968, SRs 831, 832, and 833 were renumbered SRs 431, 432, and 433 respectively.
SR 833	entire route	PSH 12	In 1968, SRs 831, 832, and 833 were renumbered SRs 431, 432, and 433 respectively.
SR 900	entire route	PSH 2	
SR 901	entire route	SSH 2D	In 1971, the portion of SR 901 from Bellevue to downtown Redmond was renumbered as SR 908. In 1992, the remaining portion of SR 901 was dropped from the state highway system.
SR 902	entire route	SSH 11D	
SR 903	entire route	SSH 2E	
SR 904	entire route	SSH 11H	The SR 904 designation was assigned in 1964. However, it remained posted as a section of US 10/395 (and not as SR 904) until I-90 was completed past Cheney in 1966.
