= Washington State Route 128 =

State highway in Washington, United States

State Route 128

- A map of Washington's highway system in the Clarkston area with SR 128 highlighted in red.

Route information
- Auxiliary route of US 12
- Maintained by WSDOT
- Length: 2.30 mi (3.70 km)
- Existed: 1964–present

Major junctions
- West end: US 12 in Clarkston
- SR 193 near Clarkston
- East end: SH-128 at Idaho state line near Clarkston

Location
- Country: United States
- State: Washington

Highway system
- State highways in Washington; Interstate; US; State; Scenic; Pre-1964; 1964 renumbering; Former
← SR 127	→ SR 129

State Route 128 (SR 128) is a Washington state highway located in Asotin and Whitman counties, west of the Idaho state line. The 2.30-mile (3.70 km) long route runs north from U.S. Route 12 (US 12) in Clarkston to cross the Snake River and turn east after intersecting SR 193 to terminate at State Highway 128 (SH 128) on the Idaho state line. The highway was originally created in 1964 on a Pomeroy–Clarkston route, replacing Secondary State Highway 3K (SSH 3K), which had been established in 1937; in 1991, the route was changed to its present form.

== Route description ==
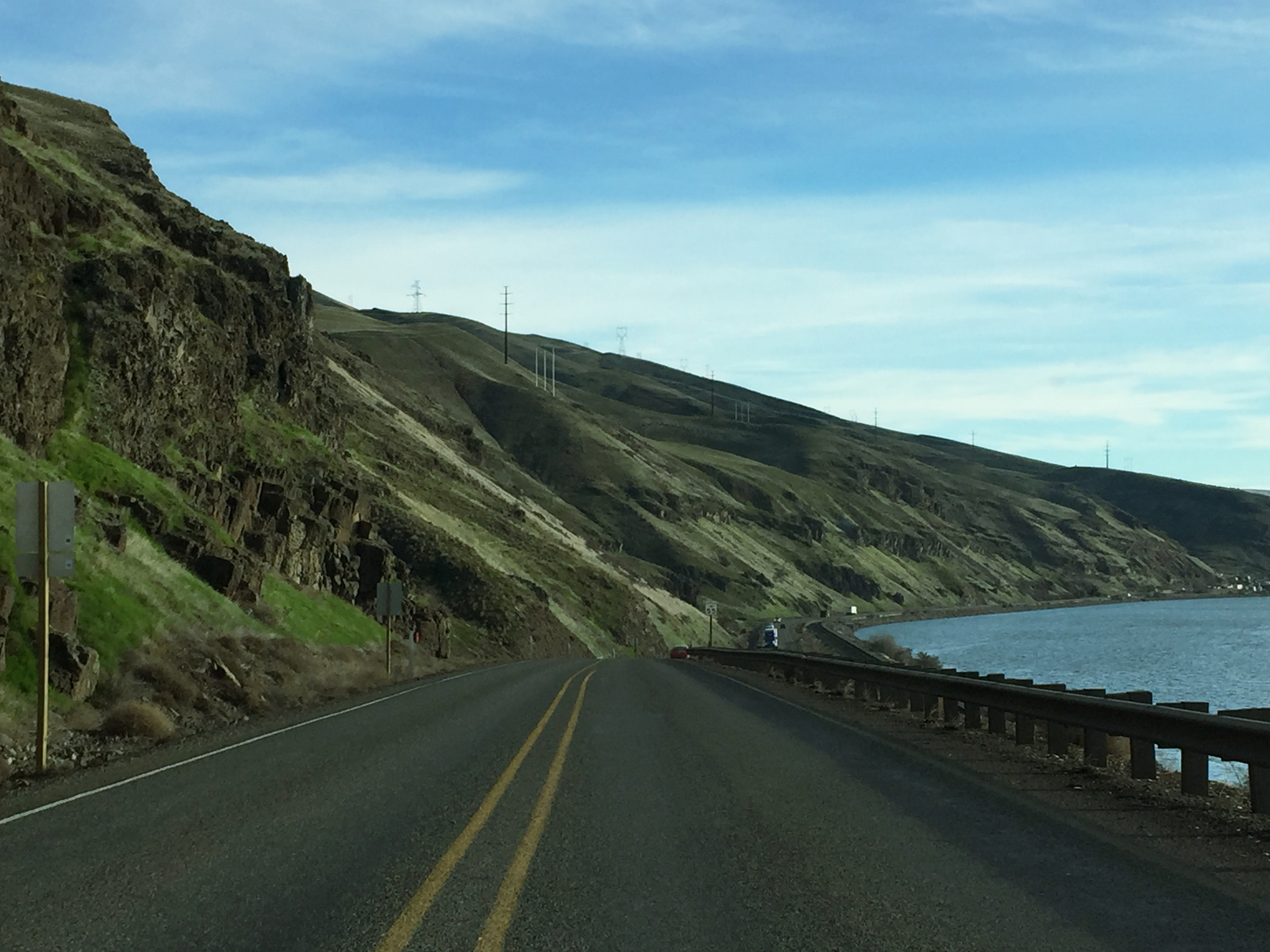
Route 128 along the Snake River

State Route 128 (SR 128) begins at an intersection with U.S. Route 12 (US 12) in Clarkston, a city in Asotin County. The road then crosses the Snake River over the Red Wolf Crossing into Whitman County, where it crosses the Starbuck, WA–Spalding, ID route of the Great Northwest Railroad and intersects the eastern terminus of SR 193. At the SR 193 intersection, the highway turns east and continues to the Idaho state line, where it becomes Idaho State Highway 128 (SH-128); which continues for another 2.198 miles (3.537 km) before ending at US-12 north of Lewiston, Idaho. SR 128 after the US 12 intersection was used by 5,000 motorists daily in 2007 based on annual average daily traffic (AADT) data collected by the Washington State Department of Transportation.

== History ==
The shield of Secondary State Highway 3K (SSH 3K) from 1937–1964

The first highway that would later become SR 128 was Secondary State Highway 3K (SSH 3K), which was first designated in 1937. The road ran from Pomeroy in Garfield County southeast to Peola and later northeast to Clarkston, terminating at Primary State Highway 3 (PSH 3), co-signed with U.S. Route 410 (US 410) at both termini. During the 1964 highway renumbering, SSH 3K became SR 128, which ran 42.19 miles (67.90 km); the current route of the highway was occupied by SR 193, which was Secondary State Highway 3G from 1969 to 1970.

In 1990, the state legislature approved an extension of SR 128 across the Red Wolf Crossing (replacing a section of SR 193) and east to the Idaho state line. The extension was in response to the state of Idaho designating Idaho State Highway 128 on the other side of the border. A year later, SR 128 was truncated from Pomeroy to Clarkston along its current route, a loss of 42.19 miles (67.90 km) in total. The transfer was estimated to cost the county government $250,000 for maintenance, due in part to 1 mile (1.6 km) of new pavement required near Peola.

== Major intersections ==
County	Location	mi	km	Destinations	Notes
Asotin	Clarkston	0.00	0.00	US 12 – Walla Walla, Pullman, Yakima	
Snake River		0.39	0.63	Red Wolf Crossing	
Whitman		0.51	0.82	SR 193 (Wawawai River Road)	
Whitman		2.30	3.70	SH-128 at the Washington – Idaho state line	
1.000 mi = 1.609 km; 1.000 km = 0.621 mi
