= U.S. Route 12 in Washington =

Section of U.S. Highway in Washington, United States

U.S. Route 12
- US 12 highlighted in red

Route information
- Maintained by WSDOT
- Length: 430.52 mi (692.85 km)
- Existed: 1967–present
- Tourist routes: Lewis and Clark Trail; White Pass Scenic Byway

Major junctions
- West end: US 101 in Aberdeen
- SR 8 in Elma; I-5 near Chehalis; SR 7 near Morton; SR 123 near Mount Rainier; SR 410 near Naches; I-82 / US 97 in Yakima; I-182 / US 395 in Pasco; US 730 near Wallula; SR 125 in Walla Walla
- East end: US 12 in Clarkston

Location
- Country: United States
- State: Washington
- Counties: Grays Harbor, Thurston, Lewis, Yakima, Benton, Franklin, Walla Walla, Columbia, Garfield, Asotin

Highway system
- United States Numbered Highway System; List; Special; Divided; State highways in Washington; Interstate; US; State; Scenic; Pre-1964; 1964 renumbering; Former
← SR 11	→ SR 14

U.S. Route 12 (US 12) is a major east–west U.S. Highway, running from Aberdeen, Washington, to Detroit, Michigan. It spans 430.5 miles (692.8 km) across the state of Washington, making it the second longest highway in the state. It is also the only numbered highway to span the entire state from west to east, starting near the Pacific Ocean, and crossing the Idaho state line near Clarkston. It crosses the Cascade Range over White Pass, south of Mount Rainier National Park. Portions of it are concurrent with Interstate 5 (I-5) and Interstate 82 (I-82), although the majority of the route does not parallel any interstate highway. The route is also entirely concurrent with I-82's auxiliary route, Interstate 182.

Although US 12 was not extended into Washington until 1967, portions of it have been part of Washington's state highway system since as early as 1905. The last part of the highway to open was over White Pass in 1951, although it was added to the state highway system by the legislature in 1931. Most of the route (except for the approximately 160 miles (260 km) between Elma and Naches) had been part of the U.S. Highway System since its inception in 1926 as part of U.S. Route 410. The portion between Napavine and Grand Mound was also designated a U.S. Highway in 1926 as part of U.S. Route 99.

== Route description ==
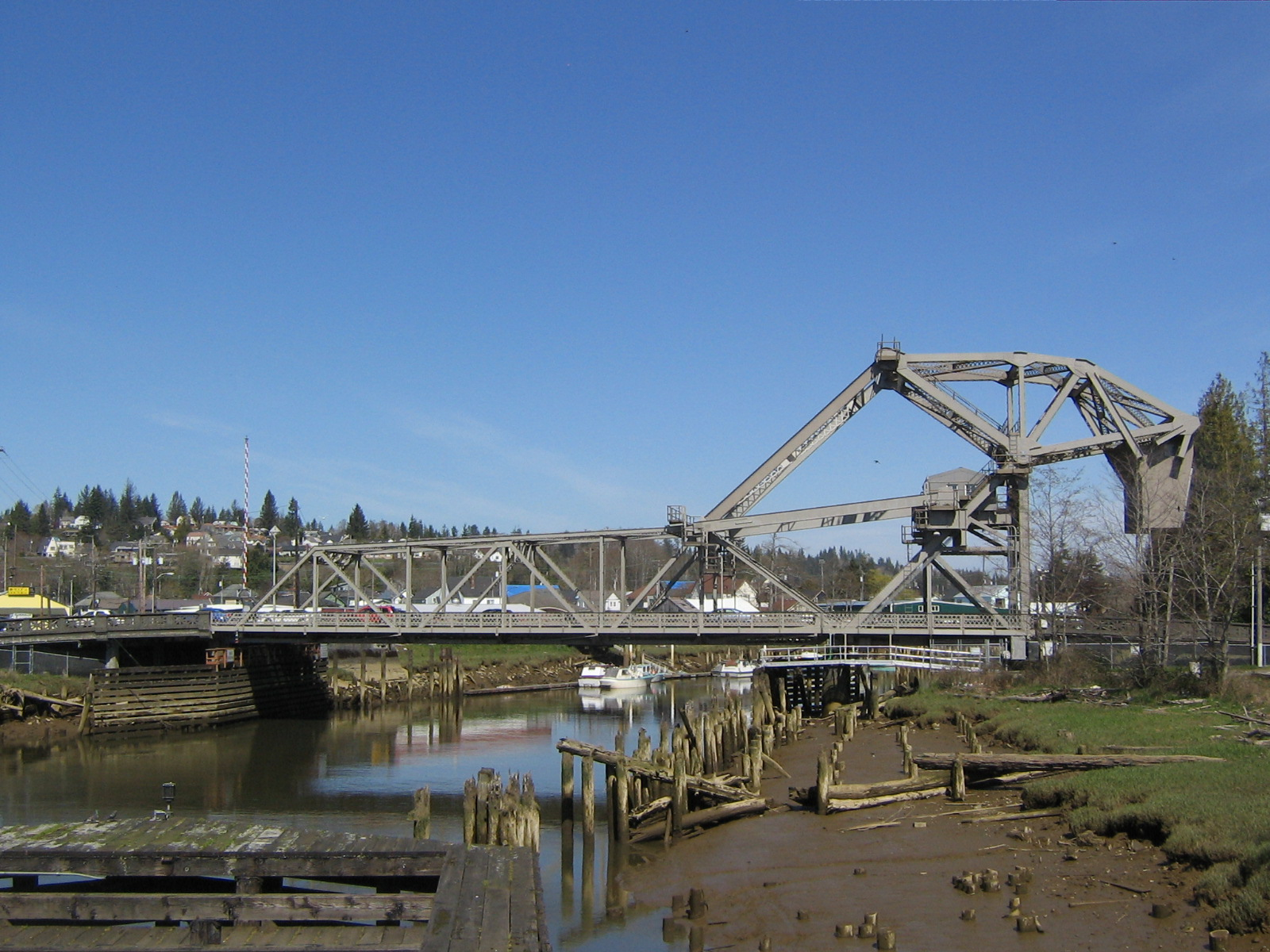
US 12 crossing the Wishkah River near Aberdeen

US 12 begins in downtown Aberdeen on the Pacific Coast as a pair of one-way streets: Heron Street for eastbound traffic and Wishkah Street for westbound traffic. The streets travel from the highway's western terminus at US 101, which continues west to Hoquiam and south to Cosmopolis, across the Wishkah River and merge onto Wishkah Street near a shopping center. US 12 leaves Aberdeen and follows the Chehalis River east through Central Park as a four-lane divided highway. The highway bypasses the towns of Montesano and Elma, which are served by interchanges as well as a junction with SR 107 in the former.

In Elma, US 12 exits at a diamond interchange, while the highway continues east to Olympia as SR 8. US 12 heads southeast towards Oakville and Rochester, still following the Chehalis River. East of Oakville, US 12 runs north of the Chehalis Indian Reservation. It then continues east through the town of Rochester, and interchanges with I-5 at exit 88 in the town of Grand Mound.

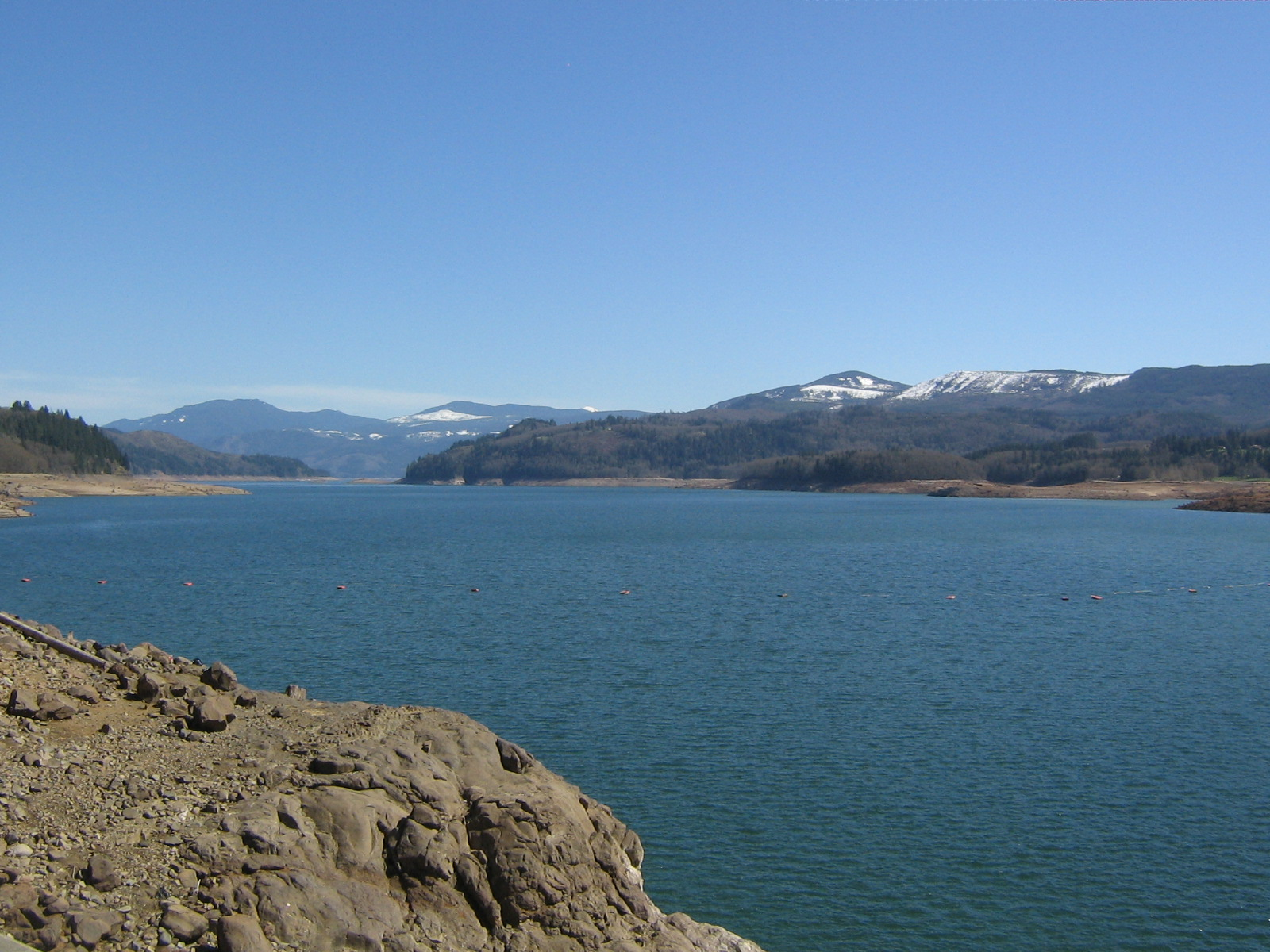
Riffe Lake

US 12 continues south concurrent with I-5 through Chehalis and Centralia before exiting again at exit 68 south of Napavine. The highway then heads east along the Cowlitz River and passes through the town of Mossyrock, where it intersects SR 122. East of Mossyrock, US 12 runs just north of Mossyrock Dam and Riffe Lake. In the town of Morton, it intersects SR 7, which heads north to Tacoma. It then ascends the Cascade Range, passing south of Mount Rainier, and intersects SR 123, which serves the Stevens Canyon entrance of Mount Rainier National Park. 12 miles (19 km) east of this intersection, US 12 crosses the Cascades over White Pass at an elevation of 4,500 feet (1,372 m). White Pass is the only crossing of the Cascades open year-round between I-90 over Snoqualmie Pass and SR 14 through the Columbia River Gorge.

After it descends the mountains, US 12 intersects SR 410 (formerly US 410) west of Naches, which serves Chinook Pass, Cayuse Pass, and the White River entrance of Mount Rainier National Park. East of Naches, US 12 widens once again to four lanes as it approaches the city of Yakima. There, it has an interchange with I-82 and US 97 at exit 31. US 12 then runs concurrently with I-82, bypassing the towns of Toppenish and Prosser and paralleling the Yakima River, until exit 102 near the Tri-Cities. At exit 102, it meets the western terminus of Interstate 182. US 12 and I-182 then run concurrently east over Goose Gap and through the Tri-Cities. In Pasco, I-182 ends, and US 12 intersects US 395.

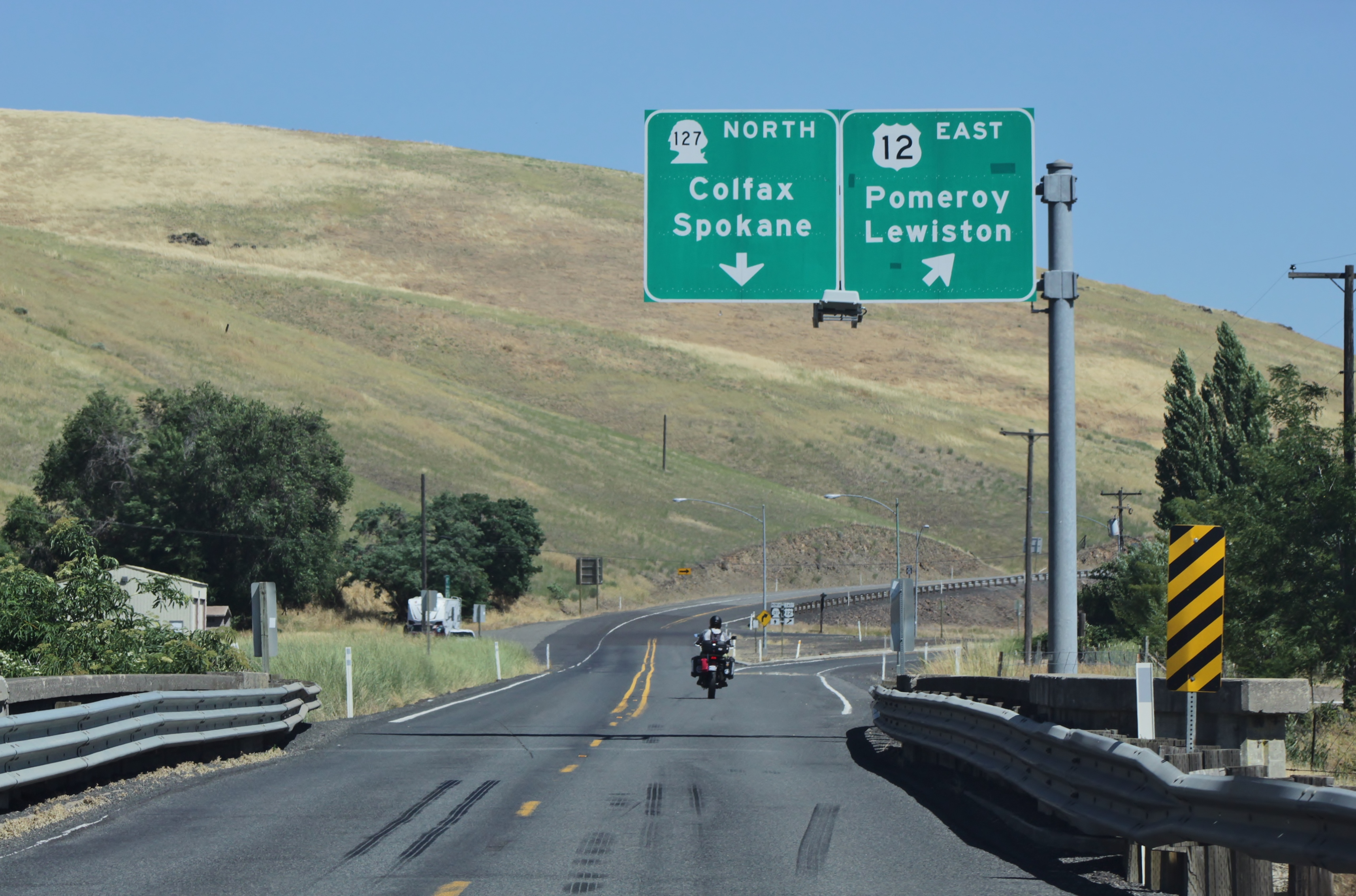
US 12 at a junction with SR 127 in rural Garfield County

US 12 then heads south to the town of Wallula, intersecting US 730, then east to Walla Walla, north to Dodge, and east to Clarkston before crossing the Idaho state line over the Snake River just outside Lewiston. US 12 through Walla Walla consists of a four-lane bypass, also known as Inland Empire Highway. The alignment of US 12 through Walla Walla County passes by a number of historical landmarks, such as Whitman Mission and Fort Walla Walla.

== History ==
The Washington section of US 12 was originally developed as a state highway in the early 20th century. It was incorporated into several later highways, including US 410.

=== Early years ===
State Road 5 (brown) as defined in 1905 and shifted west in 1907 and 1923

The Washington State Legislature created the State Highway Board in 1905 and appropriated funds to construct—but not maintain—twelve highways in sparsely settled areas of the state. Main highways in more populated areas would continue to be entirely under county control, though sometimes built with 50% state funding. Six of these highways were east-west crossings of the Cascades, including one in the corridor currently served by U.S. Route 12—State Road 5, the Cowlitz Pass State Road, climbing east from a point near Salkum via the Cowlitz River, over Cowlitz Pass, and down towards Yakima. A 1907 amendment renamed State Road 5 the Cowlitz-Natches Road, moved the Cascade crossing north to Carlton Pass, and defined the portion east of the pass to follow the Bumping River and Naches River to a point near Naches. East of the mouth of the American River, this replaced part of State Road 1 (North Yakima and Natches State Road), which had been defined in 1897 to cross the Cascades north of Chinook Pass and included in the 1905 appropriations.

Under a 1909 law, the State Highway Board surveyed a connected network of proposed state roads. Included was a westerly extension of SR 5 via Chehalis to South Bend and Aberdeen and an easterly extension to Pullman. A route from Yakima southeast and east via the Tri-Cities to Idaho was also surveyed, mostly as an extension of State Road 8 (Columbia River Road). The legislature added most of these routes to the state highway system in 1913, when they formed a two-tiered system of primary and secondary roads. Primary roads were completely controlled by the state, including maintenance, and received only names, while secondary roads kept their numbers and county maintenance. The National Park Highway replaced State Road 5 west of Riffe, and extended as surveyed to and beyond South Bend, and the McClellan Pass Highway replaced State Road 1 and continued via State Road 5 to Yakima. The majority of the route from Yakima via Connell to Pullman was not added at that time; it was finally taken over in 1937 as Secondary State Highways 11A and 11B. Only the route via the Tri-Cities, forming part of the Inland Empire Highway, continued from Yakima to Idaho. East of Pomeroy, the original survey had curved south, using State Road 16 to near the Oregon state line; this was bypassed by the 1913 designation, which instead continued directly east to Clarkston. Unlike the earlier state roads, these primary roads mostly followed existing passable county roads. The incomplete roadway between Riffe and the American River remained as part of secondary State Road 5, and the legislature designated the surveyed route from the National Park Highway near Raymond north to Aberdeen as secondary State Road 20 in 1915.

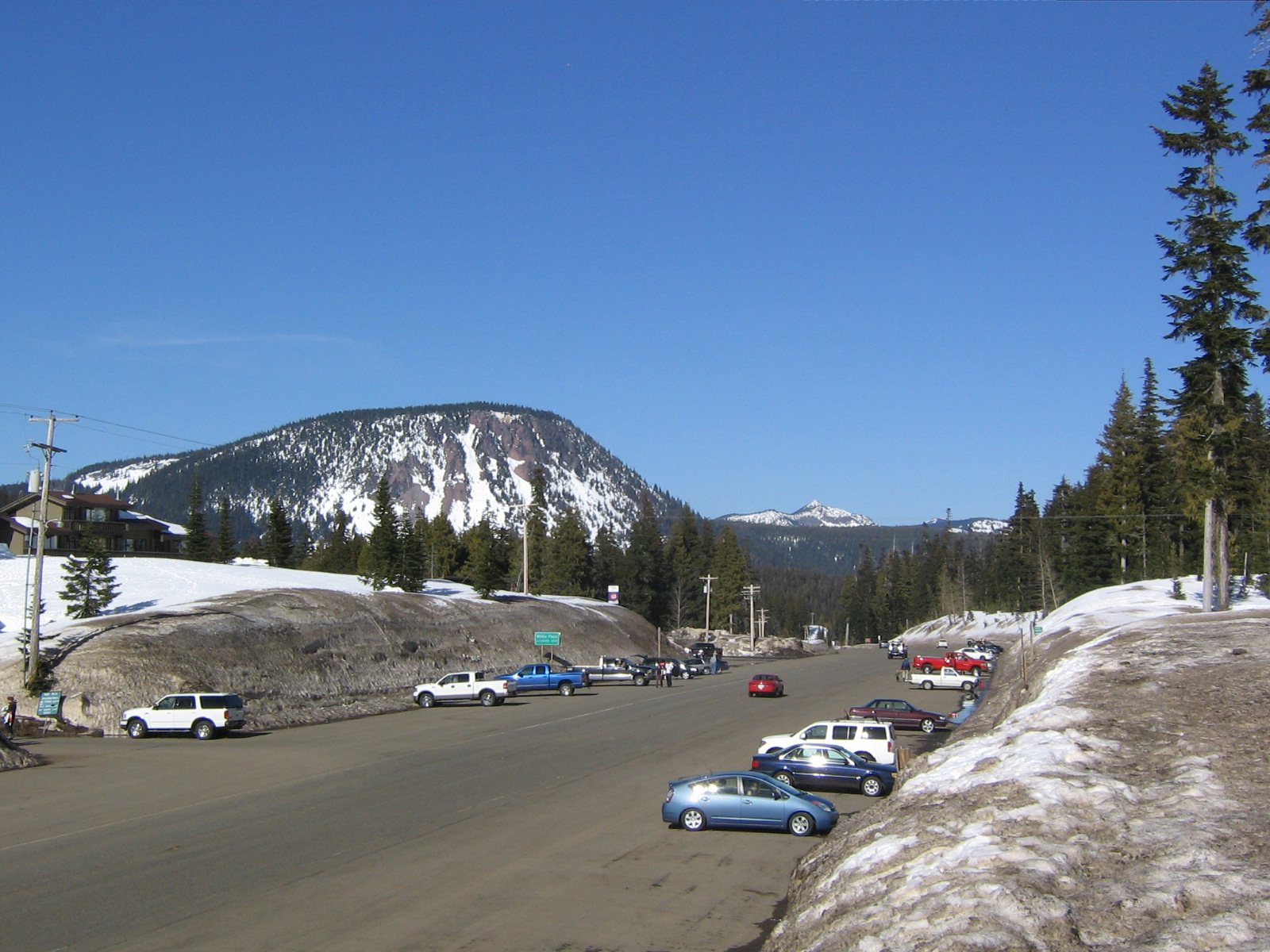
US 12 through White Pass

A 1923 restructuring of the system reassigned numbers to almost all the primary state highways. State Road 5 became a primary route and was greatly expanded, taking over the entire McClellan Pass Highway and the National Park Highway east of the Pacific Highway. The former secondary State Road 5 was realigned starting from near Packwood, heading north instead of east, alongside the Ohanapecosh River to the old McClellan Pass Highway at Cayuse Pass, west of the summit of the Cascades. The new State Road 5, named the National Park Highway System, now included four roads in the vicinity of Mount Rainier National Park, but as the road across the Cascades at Chinook Pass was not yet built, these roads did not connect with each other. Also included in this numbering was the designation of the Inland Empire Highway, including Yakima to Clarkston, as State Road 3. In 1925, a spur was added to State Road 9—the Olympic Highway, looping around the Olympic Peninsula—connecting Elma to the Pacific Highway at Grand Mound, and creating a shortcut between the Cowlitz River route and Aberdeen. The Olympic Highway from Elma west to Aberdeen had been added to the state highway system in 1905 west of and 1913 east of Montesano.

=== U.S. Route 410 ===
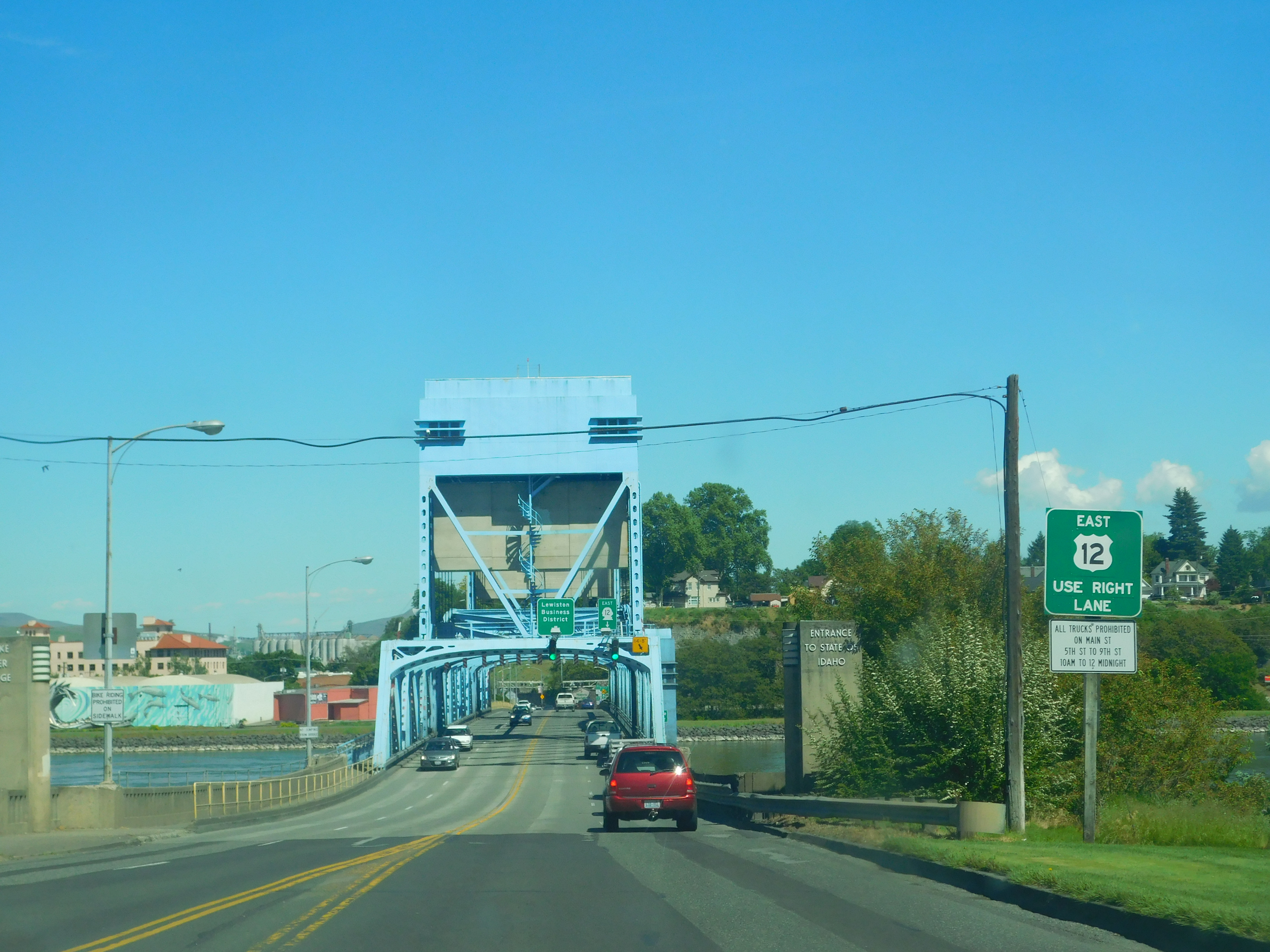
Photo taken from Clarkston, Washington of the Interstate Highway Bridge (built in 1939), with Lewiston, Idaho in the background. This bridge carries U.S. Route 12 between Washington state and Idaho.

As part of the U.S. Highway system laid out in 1925 and finalized in late 1926, US 410 connected Aberdeen with Clarkston, following the Olympic Highway (State Road 9) to Olympia, the Pacific Highway (State Road 1)—concurrent with US 99—to Tacoma, the National Park Highway System (State Road 5) to Yakima, and the Inland Empire Highway (State Road 3) to Clarkston. This differed from present US 12 between Elma and Naches in that it followed the route through Olympia and Tacoma rather than along the Cowlitz River. However, despite being part of the state highway system since 1897, US 410's crossing of the Cascades, the first between the Columbia River Gorge and Snoqualmie Pass, was not opened to traffic until 1931. The new highway, named the Mather Memorial Highway for conservationist Stephen Mather, was dedicated on July 2, 1932. A shortcut from near Packwood east across White Pass to Naches, very close to the original plan for the east half of State Road 5, was added to the state highway system in 1931 as another branch of the highway. The roadway between Packwood and Cayuse Pass, added to the state highway system on a different alignment in 1905, was finally completed in 1940, and the White Pass Highway was dedicated on August 12, 1951, opening a shortcut between southwest Washington and Yakima.

When the U.S. Highways were first established in 1926, US 12 ended in Miles City, Montana, and most of US 12's current routing in Washington was followed by US 410. U.S. Route 12 was extended westward in stages; an extension to Lewiston, Idaho, was approved on June 19, 1962. At various times in the early 1960s, the states of Idaho, Washington, and Oregon submitted plans for further westward extension to the American Association of State Highway Officials (AASHO) to either Vancouver, Washington or Boardman, Oregon—or, a plan submitted in 1963 had the highway going only as far as Pasco—but all of these plans were rejected. Washington introduced a new system of sign route numbers in 1964. While US 410 was still signed as such, present US 12 became State Route 8 between US 410 at Elma and US 99/I-5 at Grand Mound and State Route 14 between US 99/I-5 at Chehalis and US 410 at Naches.

=== Renumbering and realignments ===
The extension of US 12 to Aberdeen was approved on June 20, 1967, with US 12 taking over much of US 410's former routing. However, where US 410 had crossed the Cascades at Chinook Pass, US 12 used the all-weather White Pass, replacing SR 8 and SR 14. Signs were changed in late December 1967, and the bypassed segments of US 410 became a new SR 8 between Elma and Olympia, and SR 410 between Tacoma and Naches. Due to construction of the Mossyrock Dam on the Cowlitz River, which would create Riffe Lake and inundate parts of the valley, US 12 was relocated in December 1967 on a 16-mile (26 km) route that traveled through Morton. The detour was opened early after the Nesika Bridge over the Cowlitz River was destroyed in a fire started accidentally by construction crews a month earlier. The final project near the dam, a 1,136-foot (346 m) arch bridge over the Cowlitz River, opened in May 1968 and was primarily financed by Tacoma City Light; at the time, it was the longest concrete arch bridge in North America.

The Montesano–Elma section of US 12 was moved to a new, 9-mile (14 km) divided highway in February 1969 after construction was completed on the last section of the Ocean Freeway. Construction of a 6.5-mile (10.5 km) freeway to bypass downtown Walla Walla began in 1971 and was completed three years later at a cost of $13 million—about $5 million over the original estimate due to inflation. The freeway opened on October 17, 1973, despite local opposition that compared the elevated overpasses to the Berlin Wall. In 1985, US 12 was moved onto I-182 in the Tri-Cities, while its former route through Kennewick was replaced with an extension of SR 240. The change was not formally submitted to the AASHTO until 2006. The White Pass Scenic Byway was designated as a National Scenic Byway in October 2009.

Local officials in Walla Walla County began lobbying for the replacement of two-lane sections on US 12 between the Tri-Cities and Walla Walla with a four-lane divided highway in the 1970s. The project was funded by the state government in 2001 and broken up into eight phases, of which six were completed between 2004 and 2012 at a cost of $180 million. The seventh phase, bypassing Touchet and constructing 11 miles (18 km) of four-lane highway with two interchanges, began construction in 2021 and opened to traffic on June 2, 2023. It was deemed "operationally complete" on August 1. The original opening date of May 26 was delayed by a week after issues with a paint truck needed for road striping. Construction of the final phase, bypassing Wallula Junction, remains partially funded as of 2025 and construction is estimated to begin in 2027 and finish by 2030`.

== Major intersections ==
County	Location	mi	km	Exit	Destinations	Notes
Grays Harbor	Aberdeen	0.00	0.00		US 101 to SR 105 / SR 109 – Westport, Grayland, Raymond, Port Angeles, Hoquiam	
Grays Harbor		9.41	15.14		Devonshire Road	
Grays Harbor	Montesano	10.24	16.48		SR 107 – Montesano, Raymond	
Grays Harbor	Elma	20.19	32.49		3rd Street – Satsop Development Park	Interchange
Grays Harbor	Elma	20.99	33.78		SR 8 east – Olympia	Interchange
Thurston	Rochester	41.58	66.92		Albany Street	Former SR 121
Thurston	Grand Mound	46.07	74.14		Old Highway 99 – Grand Mound	Former US 99 south
Thurston	Grand Mound	46.32	74.54	88	I-5 north / Old Highway 99 – Seattle, Tenino	Western end of I-5 concurrency; western end of freeway; former US 99 north
Lewis	Centralia	51.92	83.56	82	Harrison Avenue / Factory Outlet Way	
Lewis	Centralia	52.98	85.26	81	SR 507 (Mellen Street)	Southbound exit is via exit 82.
Lewis	Chehalis	55.57	89.43	79	Chamber Way	
Lewis	Chehalis	56.68	91.22	77	SR 6 west – Pe Ell, Raymond	
Lewis	Chehalis	58.10	93.50	76	13th Street	
Lewis	Chehalis	60.27	97.00	74	Labree Road	
Lewis	Napavine	61.87	99.57	72	Rush Road	
Lewis	Napavine	63.60	102.35	71	SR 508 east – Onalaska, Napavine	
Lewis		66.24	106.60	68	I-5 south – Portland	Eastern end of I-5 concurrency; eastern end of freeway
Lewis	Mary's Corner	68.86	110.82		Jackson Highway – Lewis and Clark State Park	Former US 99
Lewis	Silver Creek	79.98	128.72		SR 122 east	
Lewis	Mossyrock	86.59	139.35		SR 122 west	
Lewis	Morton	97.40	156.75		SR 7 north – Morton, Mount Rainier, Tacoma	
Lewis	Randle	114.72	184.62		SR 131 south to FR 23 / FR 25 – Mount St. Helens	
Lewis		138.34	222.64		SR 123 north – Mount Rainier National Park	
Lewis–Yakima county line		150.79	242.67	White Pass		
Yakima		185.08	297.86		SR 410 west – Chinook Pass	
Yakima		199.06	320.36	Western end of freeway		
Yakima	Yakima	199.64	321.29		Fruitvale Boulevard, North 40th Avenue	
Yakima	Yakima	201.25	323.88		North 16th Avenue	
Yakima	Yakima	202.19	325.39		North 1st Street	
Yakima	Yakima	202.44	325.80	31	I-82 west / US 97 north (SR 823 north) – Selah, Ellensburg	Western end of I-82 and US 97 concurrencies
Yakima	Yakima	203.72	327.86	33A	Fair Avenue, Lincoln Avenue	Eastbound exit only
Yakima	Yakima	204.27	328.74	33B	Yakima Avenue – Terrace Heights	Signed as exit 33 westbound
Yakima	Yakima	205.80	331.20	34	SR 24 east / Nob Hill Boulevard – Moxee	
Yakima	Union Gap	207.32	333.65	36	Valley Mall Boulevard – Union Gap	
Yakima		208.87	336.14	37	US 97 south – Goldendale	Eastern end of US 97 concurrency; eastbound exit and westbound entrance
Yakima		209.13	336.56	38	Union Gap	Westbound exit and eastbound entrance
Yakima		211.37	340.17	40	Thorp Road, Parker Road	
Yakima		215.35	346.57	44	Wapato	
Yakima		221.14	355.89	50	SR 22 east – Toppenish, Buena	
Yakima	Zillah	223.11	359.06	52	Zillah, Toppenish	
Yakima	Zillah	225.11	362.28	54	Division Road – Zillah	
Yakima	Granger	229.53	369.39	58	SR 223 south – Granger	
Yakima	Outlook	234.67	377.66	63	Sunnyside, Outlook	
Yakima	Sunnyside	237.96	382.96	67	Sunnyside, Mabton	
Yakima	Sunnyside	239.97	386.19	69	SR 241 – Vernita Bridge, Sunnyside, Mabton	
Yakima	Grandview	243.64	392.10	73	Stover Road – Grandview	
Yakima	Grandview	246.08	396.03	75	County Line Road – Grandview	
Benton	Prosser	250.96	403.88	80	CR 12 (Wine Country Road) / Gap Road – Prosser	
Benton	Prosser	253.37	407.76	82	SR 22 to SR 221 – Mabton, Paterson	
Benton		259.58	417.75	88	Gibbon Road	
Benton		264.64	425.90	93	Yakitat Road	
Benton	Benton City	267.61	430.68	96	SR 224 east / SR 225 north – West Richland, Benton City	
Benton		273.62	440.35	102	I-82 east – Umatilla, Pendleton I-182 east – Richland, Pasco	Eastern end of I-82 concurrency; western end of I-182 concurrency; exit 102 on I-82 eastbound, unnumbered exit on I-182 westbound
Benton	Richland	276.55	445.06	3	Queensgate Drive	Signed as exits 3A (south) and 3B (north) westbound
Benton	Richland	277.45	446.51	4	SR 240 west / Wellsian Way – Vantage	Western end of SR 240 concurrency
Benton	Richland	278.57	448.31	5	SR 240 east (George Washington Way) – Kennewick	Eastern end of SR 240 concurrency; signed as exits 5A (south) and 5B (north)
Columbia River		279.66	450.07	Interstate 182 Bridge		
Franklin	Pasco	280.93	452.11	7	Broadmoor Boulevard	
Franklin	Pasco	282.95	455.36	9	Road 68	
Franklin	Pasco	285.86	460.05	12A	US 395 south – Kennewick, Pendleton	Western end of US 395 concurrency
Franklin	Pasco	286.30	460.76	12B	North 20th Avenue – Columbia Basin College	
Franklin	Pasco	287.38	462.49	13	North 4th Avenue – Pasco City Center	
Franklin	Pasco	287.99	463.47	14	US 395 north / SR 397 south (Oregon Avenue) – Spokane, Finley	Eastern end of US 395 concurrency; signed as exits 14A (south) and 14B (north)
Franklin	Pasco	288.85	464.86		I-182 ends	Eastern end of I-182 concurrency
Franklin	Pasco	289.57	466.02		East Lewis Street – Kahlotus	
Franklin	Pasco	290.80	468.00	Eastern end of freeway		
Walla Walla	Burbank	292.58	470.86		SR 124 east – Prescott, Waitsburg	Interchange
Walla Walla		304.66	490.30		US 730 west – Umatilla, Pendleton	
Walla Walla		315.19	507.25		Old Highway 12 – Touchet	Interchange
Walla Walla		321.46	517.34		Lower Dry Creek Road	Interchange
Walla Walla	Walla Walla	332.17	534.58		SR 125 to OR 11 (via SR 125 Spur) – Prescott, Pendleton	Interchange
Walla Walla	Walla Walla	333.47	536.67		2nd Avenue – Walla Walla City Center	Interchange
Walla Walla	Walla Walla	334.76	538.74		Rees Avenue	No access across US 12
Walla Walla	Walla Walla	336.66	541.80		Airport Road – Port of Walla Walla, Walla Walla Regional Airport	Interchange
Walla Walla	Walla Walla	338.16	544.22		Isaacs Avenue	Interchange
Walla Walla	Waitsburg	354.01	569.72		SR 124 west – Prescott	
Columbia		369.09	593.99		Turner Road	Former SR 126 east
Columbia		378.64	609.36		SR 261 north	
Garfield		387.22	623.17		SR 127 north – Colfax, Spokane	
Garfield		394.45	634.81		Marengo Road	Former SR 126 west
Garfield	Pomeroy	400.36	644.32		15th Street	Former SR 128 east
Asotin	Clarkston	428.96	690.34		SR 128 east to SR 193 – North Lewiston	
Asotin	Clarkston	430.34	692.57		SR 129 south – Asotin	
Asotin	Clarkston	430.40	692.66		1st Street – Port of Clarkston	
Snake River		430.52	692.85	Washington–Idaho state line (Lewiston–Clarkston Bridge)		
Snake River		430.52	692.85		US 12 east – Lewiston	Continuation into Idaho
1.000 mi = 1.609 km; 1.000 km = 0.621 mi: Concurrency terminus; Incomplete access

== See also ==
U.S. Route 12
Previous state: Terminus	Washington	Next state: Idaho
