= Washington State Route 127 =

State highway in eastern Washington, US

State Route 127

- SR 127 highlighted in red

Route information
- Auxiliary route of US 12
- Maintained by WSDOT
- Length: 27.05 mi (43.53 km)
- Existed: 1970–present

Major junctions
- South end: US 12 near Pomeroy
- North end: SR 26 at Dusty

Location
- Country: United States
- State: Washington
- Counties: Garfield, Whitman

Highway system
- State highways in Washington; Interstate; US; State; Scenic; Pre-1964; 1964 renumbering; Former
← SR 125	→ SR 128

State Route 127 (SR 127) is a 27.05-mile-long (43.53 km) state highway serving the eastern region of the U.S. state of Washington. The highway, listed on the National Highway System, begins in rural Garfield County at U.S. Route 12 (US 12) and travels north across the Snake River on the Elmer Huntley Bridge. The roadway continues into Whitman County before it ends at SR 26 in Dusty. SR 127 formed a section of the Inland Empire Highway and Primary State Highway 3 (PSH 3) prior to becoming US 295 in 1926. US 295 was decommissioned in 1968 and replaced by a longer SR 127, traveling its full length from Dodge to Colfax from its establishment in 1970 until an extension of SR 26 to Colfax in 1979.

== Route description ==
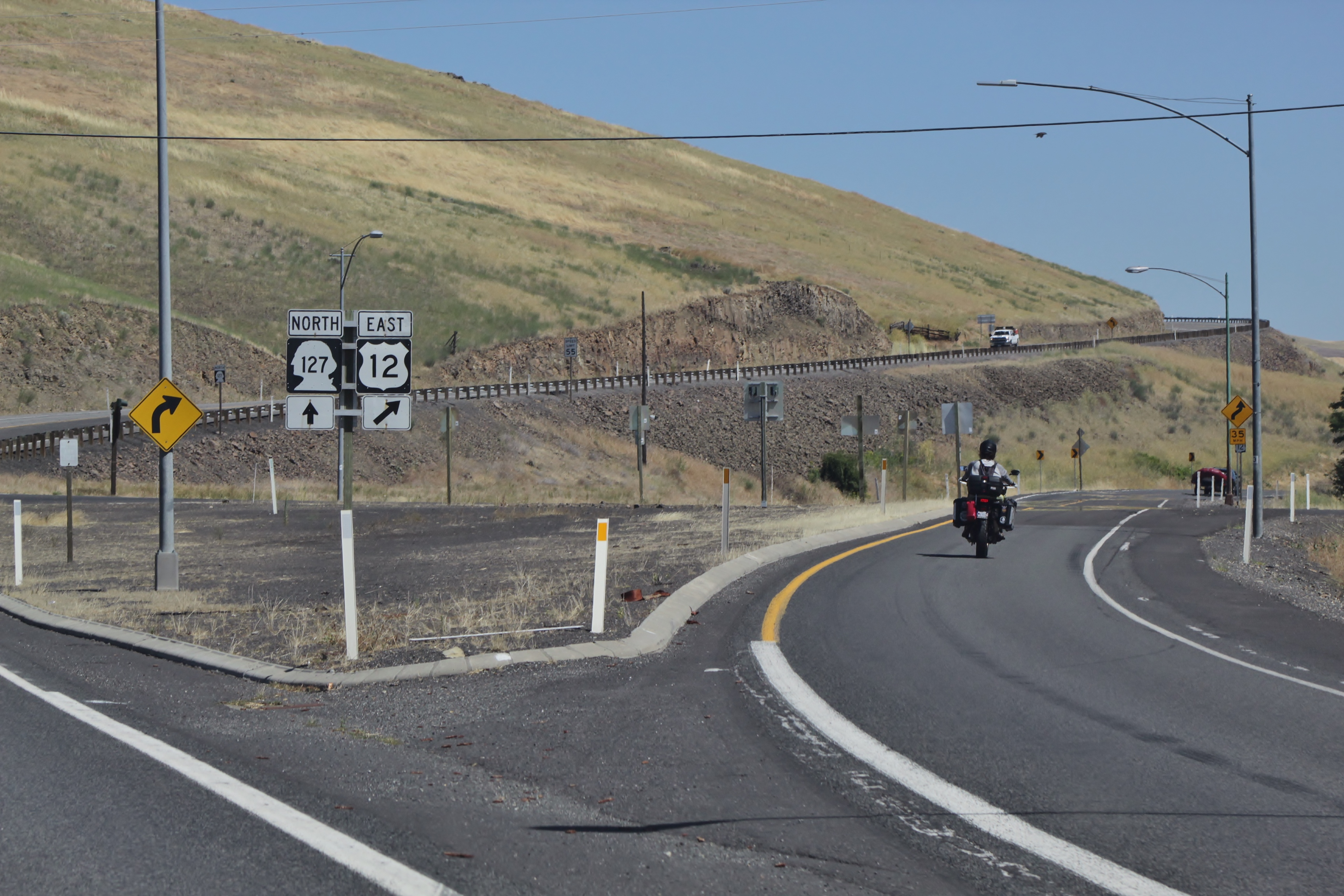
The southern terminus of SR 127 at a junction with US 12

SR 127 begins at an intersection with US 12 in the unincorporated community of Dodge, located between Starbuck and Pomeroy in rural Garfield County. The highway travels north around Dodge Hill and into the hills along New York Gulch before reaching the Snake River. SR 127 crosses the Snake River on the Elmer Huntley Bridge into Whitman County east of the former Central Ferry State Park. The highway continues northeast up the Central Ferry grade to Dusty, where SR 127 ends at an intersection with SR 26.

Every year, the Washington State Department of Transportation (WSDOT) conducts a series of surveys on its highways in the state to measure traffic volume. This is expressed in terms of annual average daily traffic (AADT), which is a measure of traffic volume for any average day of the year. In 2012, WSDOT calculated that the busiest section of SR 127 was its northern terminus at SR 26, serving 1,000 vehicles. The entire route of SR 127 is designated as part of the National Highway System, a highway system that includes roadways important to the national economy, defense, and mobility; and as a Highway of Statewide Significance by WSDOT, which includes highways that connect major communities in the state of Washington.

== History ==
U.S. Route 295
- Location: Dodge – Colfax
- Existed: 1926–1968

The present route of SR 127 was added to the Washington state highway system in 1913 as part of the Inland Empire Highway, traveling in a circular arc from Ellensburg through the Yakima Valley and into the Palouse towards the Canadian border in Laurier. The Inland Empire Highway was numbered as State Road 3 in 1923 and PSH 3 in 1937 as part of the primary and secondary state highways. The United States Highway System was adopted on November 11, 1926, by the American Association of State Highway Officials (AASHO) and included US 295, traveling northeast from US 410 at Dodge to US 195 in Colfax and crossing the Snake River at Central Ferry. US 295 succeeded PSH 3 during the 1964 state highway renumbering, but was decommissioned in 1968 before the new state highway system was codified. The roadway was re-designated as SR 127 after the new sign route number system was codified into the Revised Code of Washington in 1970, traveling 43.82 miles (70.52 km) from US 12 at Dodge to US 195 in Colfax and crossing the Snake River on the Elmer Huntley Bridge, completed in 1969. SR 127 was truncated to its present route after SR 26 was extended east to Colfax over the former route of SR 127.

== Major intersections ==
County	Location	mi	km	Destinations	Notes
Garfield		0.00	0.00	US 12 – Pomeroy, Lewiston, Walla Walla	Southern terminus
Snake River		9.65– 10.00	15.53– 16.09	Elmer Huntley Bridge	
Whitman	Dusty	27.05	43.53	SR 26 to US 195 – Othello, Vantage, Colfax, Pullman, Spokane	Northern terminus
1.000 mi = 1.609 km; 1.000 km = 0.621 mi
