= Washington State Route 121 =

State highway in Thurston County, Washington, US

State Route 121

- SR 121 highlighted in red

Route information
- Auxiliary route of US 12
- Maintained by WSDOT
- Length: 7.67 mi (12.34 km)
- Existed: 1967–present

Major junctions
- South end: I-5 near Maytown
- North end: I-5 near Tumwater

Location
- Country: United States
- State: Washington
- Counties: Thurston

Highway system
- State highways in Washington; Interstate; US; State; Scenic; Pre-1964; 1964 renumbering; Former
← SR 119	→ SR 122

State Route 121 (SR 121) is a state highway located entirely in Thurston County, Washington, United States. The highway serves Millersylvania State Park, forming a 7.67-mile (12.34 km) loop between two interchanges with Interstate 5 (I-5) near Maytown. It is an auxiliary route of U.S. Route 12 (US 12).

The highway follows roads constructed in the early 20th century and maintained by the Thurston County government until their incorporation into the state highway system. The state government created Secondary State Highway 1M (SSH 1M) in 1937, initially connecting Rochester to Tumwater before its north end was truncated to Maytown in 1959. SSH 1M was renumbered in 1964 to the short-lived SR 801, which was then replaced by SR 121 in 1967. The Rochester–Maytown section of SR 121 was replaced by the route through Millersylvania State Park in 1991, severing its connection to US 12.

== Route description ==
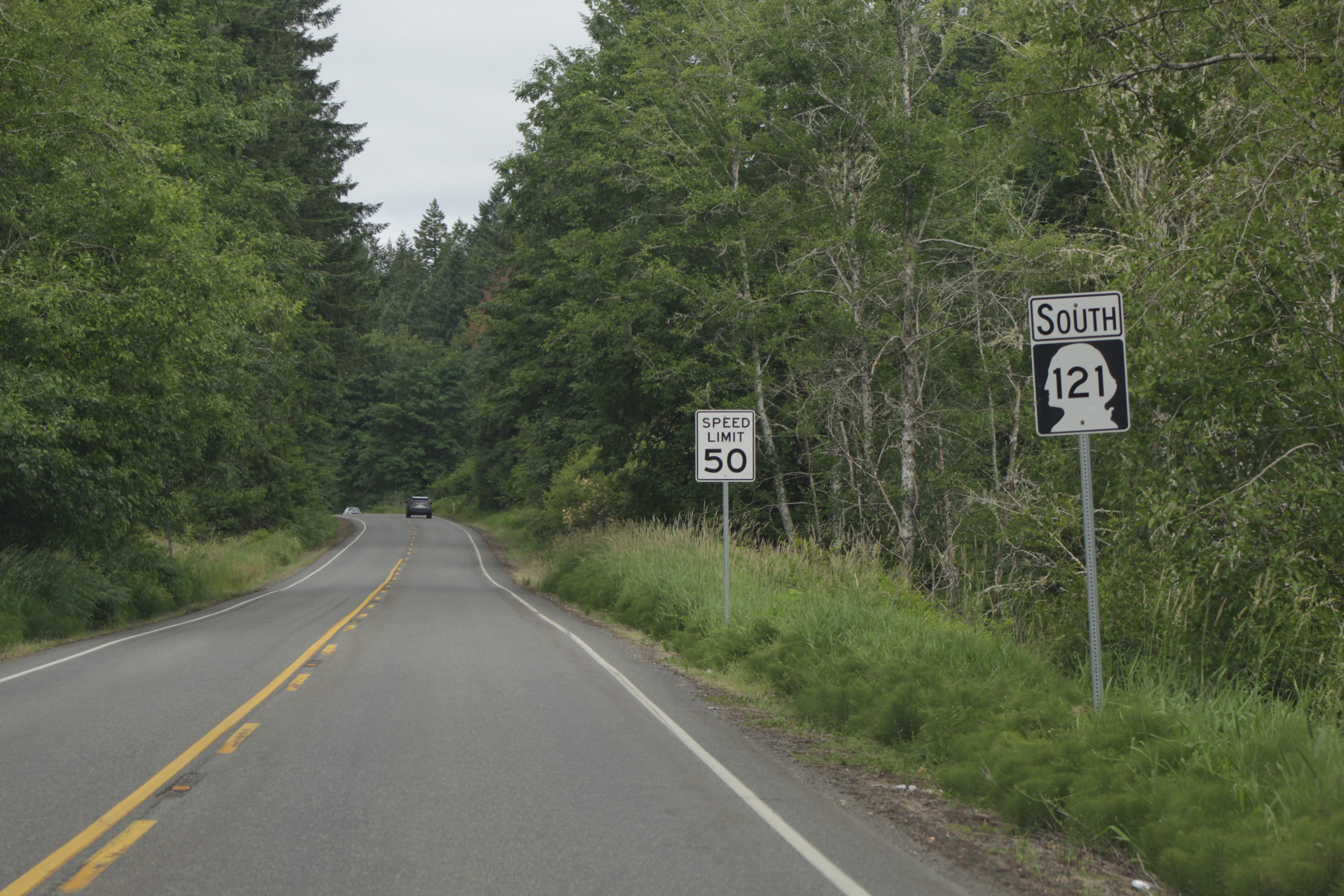
Looking southbound on SR 121 near Maytown

SR 121 begins at a partial cloverleaf interchange with I-5 and Maytown Road near the community of the same name, located east of Littlerock in southern Thurston County. It travels east along a railroad owned by Tacoma Rail, crossing Beaver Creek twice and entering a forested area. The highway then turns north onto Tilley Road and crosses over the railroad, traveling around Deep Lake and reaching Millersylvania State Park. SR 121 travels through the state park, serving its main entrance and the park headquarters, and continues north across Salmon Creek into farmland. The highway turns west onto 93rd Avenue Southeast near the runway of Olympia Regional Airport and travels through an industrial area and past a truck stop before reaching its northern terminus an interchange with I-5 in southern Tumwater.

The two-lane highway is 7.67 miles (12.34 km) long and travels through predominantly rural areas, serving primarily as a connector to Millersylvania State Park and Olympia Regional Airport. SR 121 is maintained by the Washington State Department of Transportation (WSDOT), which conducts an annual survey on state highways to measure traffic volume in terms of annual average daily traffic. Average traffic volumes on the highway in 2016 ranged from a minimum of 1,000 vehicles at its turn onto Tilley Road to a maximum of 16,000 vehicles near its northern interchange with I-5.

== History ==
A road following the Milwaukee Road from Littlerock to Maytown and continuing north towards Bush Prairie in modern-day Tumwater was constructed by the 1910s. Millersylvania State Park was established in 1924 and the north–south road through it (named Tilley Road) was improved and paved by its Civilian Conservation Corps camp in the 1930s. The westernmost section of the road near Littlerock was incorporated into the state highway system as part of Secondary State Highway 1M (SSH 1M), created in 1937 to connect Rochester to Tumwater. Maytown Road remained under Thurston County's maintenance, which included a major rebuilding project in 1954 following the completion of a freeway interchange with U.S. Route 99 (US 99), later part of I-5.

The shield of SR 801, used from 1964–1967

SSH 1M was truncated to the Maytown interchange in 1959, taking over a portion of Maytown Road. During the 1964 renumbering of state highways, which introduced a new numbering system, SSH 1M was replaced with SR 801, a auxiliary route of SR 8. Following the replacement of SR 8 by the cross-state extension of US 12 in 1967, the highway was renumbered to SR 121. The designation was previously used by a branch of SR 12 (now SR 14) between Bingen and White Salmon that was renumbered to SR 141.

In 1991, the Rochester–Maytown highway was removed from the state highway system and replaced by a loop through Millersylvania State Park as the new alignment of SR 121. The new alignment would use Maytown Road, Tilley Road, and Lathrop Road (now 93rd Avenue Southwest), terminating at an interchange with I-5 that opened in 1968. The rerouting also severed the connection between SR 121 and its parent route, US 12.

== Major intersections ==
The entire route is in Thurston County.

Location	mi	km	Destinations	Notes
	0.00	0.00	I-5 – Portland, Olympia, Seattle	Continues west as Maytown Road Southwest
	7.67	12.34	I-5 – Portland, Olympia, Seattle	Continues west as 93rd Avenue Southwest
1.000 mi = 1.609 km; 1.000 km = 0.621 mi
