= 1964 renumbering =

1964 renumbering may refer to:

- 1964 state highway renumbering (California)
- 1964 state highway renumbering (Washington)
