= McNary National Wildlife Refuge =

Protected area in the united States

- IUCN category IV (habitat/species management area)
- Location within Washington (state)
- Location: Walla Walla County, Washington, United States
- Nearest city: Pasco, Washington
- Coordinates: 46°11′49″N 118°57′19″W
- Area: 14,664.54 acres (5,935 ha)
- Established: 1956
- Governing body: U.S. Fish and Wildlife Service
- Website: McNary National Wildlife Refuge

McNary National Wildlife Refuge is a wildlife preserve, one of the national wildlife refuges operated by the United States Fish and Wildlife Service. Extending along the east bank of the Columbia River in southeastern Washington, from the confluence of the Snake River to the mouth of the Walla Walla River, and downstream into Oregon, McNary NWR is located in rural Burbank, but very close to the rapid development of the Tri-Cities (Kennewick, Pasco and Richland). In fact, the refuge meets the definition of an "urban refuge". Few areas in North America support waterfowl populations in the extraordinary numbers found here. There are spectacular concentrations of Canada geese, mallards, and other waterfowl. More than half the mallards in the Pacific Flyway overwinter at some time in this portion of the Columbia River Basin.

The refuge encompasses backwater sloughs, shrub-steppe uplands, irrigated farmlands, river islands, delta mudflats, and riparian areas. Particularly important to Canada geese, mallards, and wigeons, as well as shorebirds and wading birds, the refuge also includes wetlands and shoreline bays that serve as an important nursery for developing fall chinook salmon. Other waterfowl species using the refuge include green-winged teal, shoveler, canvasback, ring-necked ducks, and lesser scaups. Birds, including bald eagles and peregrine falcons, are found here, as are thousands of colonial nesting water birds using river islands for safe nesting.
