= U.S. Route 410 =

Former highway in Washington and Idaho, United States

U.S. Route 410
- US 410 highlighted in red on a modern map

Route information
- Auxiliary route of US 10
- Length: 469 mi (755 km)
- Existed: 1926–1967

Major junctions
- West end: US 101 in Aberdeen, WA
- US 101 near Olympia, WA; US 99 in Olympia, WA; US 97 in Yakima, WA; US 395 in Pasco, WA; US 730 near Wallula, WA
- East end: US 95 in Lewiston, ID

Location
- Country: United States
- States: Washington, Idaho
- Counties: WA: Grays Harbor, Thurston, Pierce, King, Yakima, Benton, Franklin, Walla Walla, Columbia, Garfield, Asotin; ID: Nez Perce

Highway system
- United States Numbered Highway System; List; Special; Divided
← US 401	→ US 411

U.S. Route 410 (US 410) was a U.S. Highway in Washington and Idaho that existed from 1926 to 1967. It ran 469 miles (755 km) from US 101 in Aberdeen, Washington, to US 95 in Lewiston, Idaho, passing through the cities of Olympia, Tacoma, Yakima, the Tri-Cities, and Walla Walla.

The highway had concurrencies with SR 8, US 99, and US 395. Even though the number indicates that US 410 was a spur of US 10, US 410 never connected with US 10, which is the same case with US 830 and US 30, although like the latter pair, they ran parallel in close proximity. When US 12 was extended into Washington in 1967, US 410 was decommissioned.

== Route description ==
US 410 was a spur of US 10 that traveled between Aberdeen, Washington and Lewiston, Idaho. Much of the route was renumbered to U.S. Route 12.

=== Washington ===
US 410 started at an intersection with US 101 in Aberdeen, Washington, the current western terminus of US 12. Then, US 410 went east to Olympia, where it formed a short concurrency with US 101 into Downtown Olympia. Then, US 410 followed US 99 out of Olympia and into Tacoma. In Tacoma, US 410 turned southeast and went to Sumner, through Enumclaw, and then across Chinook Pass. After going across Chinook Pass, US 410 turned east towards Pasco. In Pasco, US 410 became concurrent with US 395 and then continued east to Walla Walla. After passing Walla Walla, US 410 went into Clarkston where it crossed over the Snake River (via the Lewiston–Clarkston Bridge) into Idaho.

=== Idaho ===
After US 410 crossed the Lewiston–Clarkston Bridge over the Snake River into Idaho, the road went east and northeast to US 95, where it ended. The successor highway ("US 12") continued east to Lolo Pass and through Montana.

== History ==
US 410 was an original U.S. Highway. It was established in 1926 and decommissioned in 1967 when US 12 was extended into Washington. The Chinook Pass section was completed in 1931 and dedicated on July 2, 1932; it was named the Mather Memorial Highway for conservationist Stephen Mather.

US 410 is now separated into six different highways including the concurrences with US 101 and US 99. From US 101 to Elma, Washington, US 410 became part of US 12. From Elma, Washington, to US 101 near Olympia, Washington, US 410 became SR 8. The concurrency with US 101 stayed as part of US 101 for the full length from SR 8 to US 99 (now I-5). From US 101's end to Tacoma, Washington, US 410 became part of US 99, which was replaced by I-5. From Tacoma, Washington, to Sumner, Washington, US 410 became part of SR 167. From Sumner, Washington, to Naches, Washington, US 410 retained its original number, as SR 410. From Naches, Washington, to Lewiston, Idaho, US 410 became US 12.

In 1957, the Washington State Highway Commission applied for an expansion of the Interstate Highway System to cover the entire US 410 corridor, but were rejected. A second attempt, using a tunneled route under Naches Pass, was made in 1959 and also rejected.

== Major intersections ==
County	Location	mi	km	Destinations	Notes
Grays Harbor	Aberdeen	0	0.0	US 101 – Raymond, Forks	
Grays Harbor	Montesano	10	16	SR 107 – Montesano, Raymond	
Grays Harbor	Elma	20	32	SR 8 east – Oakville, Centralia	
Grays Harbor	McCleary	26	42	SR 108 east – McCleary, Kamilche	
Thurston		41	66	US 101 north – Shelton	Interchange; eastbound exit and westbound entrance
Thurston		55	89	Black Lake Boulevard – West Olympia	
Thurston	Tumwater	57	92	I-5 south / US 99 south – Seattle, Portland	Western end of I-5 and US 99 overlap
Thurston	Olympia	58	93	State Capitol, Olympia City Center	Signed as exit 105 northbound
Thurston	Olympia	60	97	SR 510 (Pacific Avenue)	
Thurston	Olympia	61	98	Sleater–Kinney Road	
Thurston	Lacey	62	100	Martin Way	
Pierce	DuPont	72	116	Steilacoom–DuPont Road	
Pierce	Fort Lewis	74	119	Gray Field	
Pierce	Lakewood	76	122	Berkeley Street	
Pierce	Lakewood	77	124	Thorne Lane	
Pierce	Lakewood	78	126	Gravelly Lake Drive	
Pierce	Lakewood	79	127	Bridgeport Way – McChord Field	
Pierce	Lakewood	80	130	SR 512 east / South Tacoma Way – Puyallup	
Pierce		81	130	South 84th Street	
Pierce	Tacoma	82	132	South 72nd Street, South 74th Street, South 84th Street	
Pierce	Tacoma	83	134	South 56th Street – University Place	
Pierce	Tacoma	85	137	South 38th Street	
Pierce	Tacoma	86	138	SR 7 south / SR 16 west (Pacific Avenue)	
Pierce	Tacoma	87	140	Portland Avenue	Southbound exit is via exit 135
Pierce	Tacoma	87	140	I-5 north / US 99 north – Seattle	Eastern end of I-5 and US 99 overlap
Pierce	Puyallup	93	150	SR 161 north	Western end of SR 161 overlap
Pierce	Puyallup	94	151	SR 161 south	Eastern end of SR 161 overlap
Pierce	Sumner	97	156	SR 163 (Valley Avenue East)	
Pierce	Buckley	108	174	SR 165 south – Wilkeson	
White River		110	180	Bridge over White River	
King	Enumclaw	113	182	SR 167 west (Griffin Avenue)	
Greenwater River		131	211	Bridge over Greenwater River	
Pierce		146	235	Mount Rainier National Park gate (entrance)	
Pierce		154	248	Cayuse Pass; elevation 4,630 feet (1,410 m)	
Pierce		154	248	SR 143 south	Northern terminus of SR 143
Chinook Pass		157	253	Chinook Pass; elevation 5,440 feet (1,660 m)	
Yakima	Wenatchee National Forest	157	253	Mount Rainier National Park gate (entrance)	
Yakima	Naches	204	328	SR 14 – White Pass	
Yakima	Yakima	220	350	SR 24 east (Nob Hill Boulevard) – Moxee	
Yakima	Union Gap	223	359	US 97	
Yakima	Buena	235	378	SR 22 east – Toppenish	
Yakima	Granger	245	394	SR 223 south – Granger	
Benton	Prosser	270	430	SR 22 to SR 221 – Mabton, Paterson	
Benton	Benton City	283	455	SR 224 east	
Benton	Richland	295	475	SR 240 west – Vantage	
Benton	Kennewick	300	480	SR 12 west	
Columbia River		300	480	Blue Bridge	
Franklin	Pasco	301	484	Lewis Street	Northbound exit and southbound entrance
Franklin	Pasco	305	491	US 395 north	Western end of US 395 overlap
Snake River		310	500	Vaughn Hubbard Bridge	
Walla Walla	Burbank	310	500	SR 124 east – Prescott, Waitsburg	
Walla Walla		322	518	US 395 south / US 730 west – Umatilla, Pendleton	Eastern end of US 395 overlap
Walla Walla	Walla Walla	350	560	SR 125 north (N. 13th Avenue)	Western end of SR 125 overlap
Walla Walla	Walla Walla	350	560	SR 125 south (S. 9th Avenue)	Eastern end of SR 125 overlap
Walla Walla	Waitsburg	371	597	SR 124 west – Prescott	
Columbia		386	621	SR 126 east	
Garfield	Dodge	404	650	US 295 north – Colfax, Spokane	
Garfield		411	661	SR 126 west	
Garfield	Pomeroy	417	671	SR 128 east	
Asotin	Clarkston	447	719	SR 128 east	
Asotin	Clarkston	447	719	SR 129 south – Asotin	
Snake River		448 0	721 0.0	Lewiston–Clarkston Bridge; Washington–Idaho state line	
Nez Perce	Lewiston	3	4.8	US 95 north – Moscow, Coeur d'Alene	
1.000 mi = 1.609 km; 1.000 km = 0.621 mi

== See also ==
Browse numbered routes
← SR 409	WA	→ SR 411
← SH-200	ID	→ US 630
