= Telma, Washington =

Unincorporated community in Washington, US

- Unincorporated community
- Location within Washington (state)
- Coordinates: 47°50′35″N 120°48′56″W
- Country: United States
- State: Washington
- County: Chelan
- Elevation: 1,890 ft (580 m)
- Time zone: UTC-8 (Pacific (PST))
  - Summer (DST): UTC-7 (PDT)
- ZIP code: 98826
- Area code: 509
- GNIS feature ID: 1526978

Telma is an unincorporated community in Chelan County, Washington, United States. Telma is assigned the ZIP code 98826. Telma consists of many vacation homes and cabins for people visiting Lake Wenatchee.

Telma is on the Lake Wenatchee U.S. Geological Survey Map.
