= Dodge, Washington =

Unincorporated community in Washington, United States

- Unincorporated community
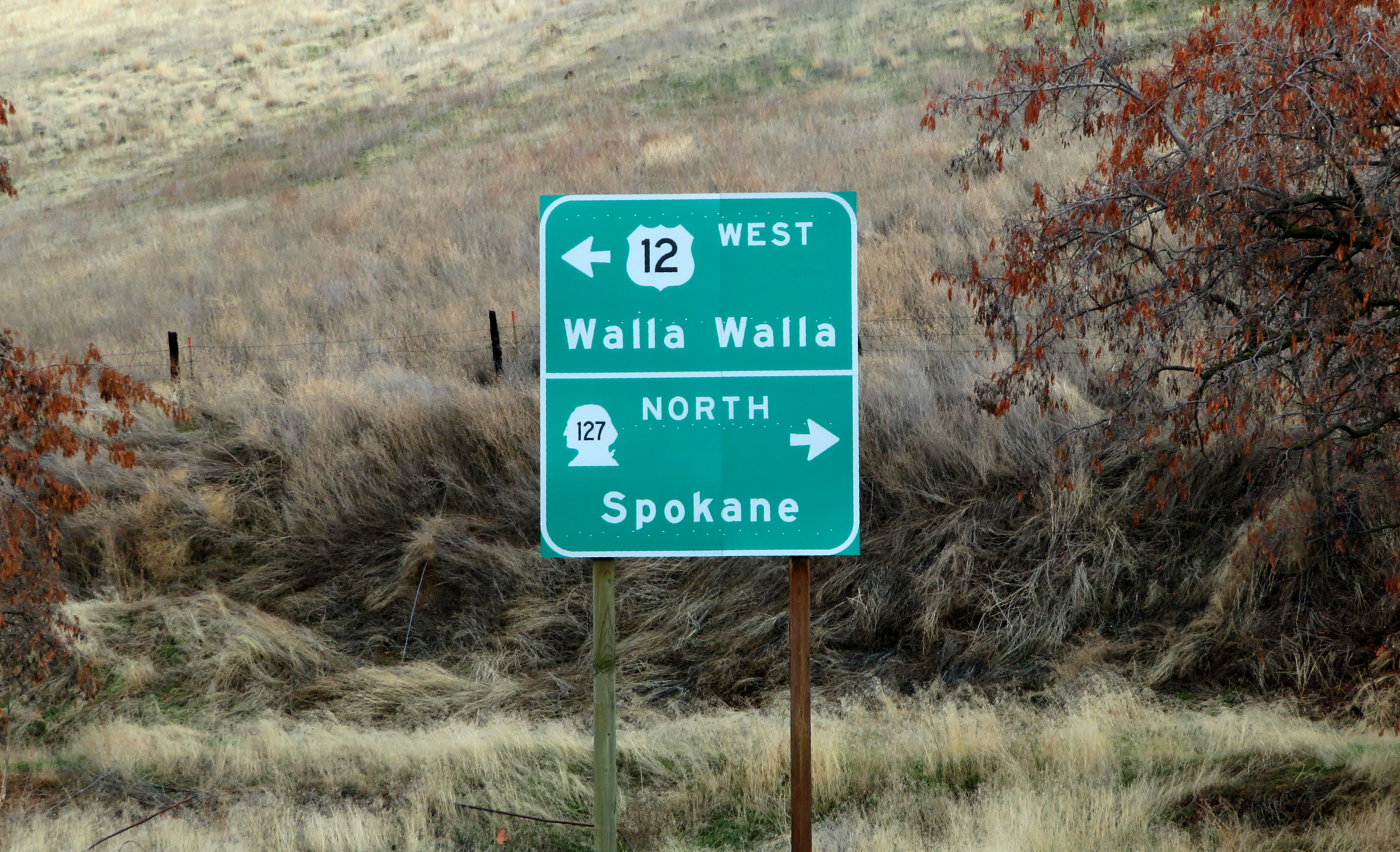
- A prominent road sign in Dodge.

- Location within Washington (state) Location within the United States
- Coordinates: 46°31′29″N 117°49′18″W
- Country: United States
- State: Washington
- County: Garfield
- Elevation: 1,273 ft (388 m)
- Time zone: UTC-8 (Pacific (PST))
  - Summer (DST): UTC-7 (PDT)
- ZIP code: 99347
- Area code: 509
- GNIS feature ID: 1530858

Dodge is an unincorporated community in Garfield County, in the Palouse region of southeastern Washington. It is located at the junction of U.S. Route 12 and State Route 127, northwest of Pomeroy.
