= Burke, Washington =

Unincorporated community in Washington, US

- Unincorporated community
- Location within Washington (state) Location within the United States
- Coordinates: 47°05′16″N 119°52′27″W
- Country: United States
- State: Washington
- County: Grant
- Established: 1907
- Time zone: UTC-8 (Pacific (PST))
  - Summer (DST): UTC-7 (PDT)
- Area code: 509
- GNIS feature ID: 1511824

Burke is an unincorporated community in Grant County, in the U.S. state of Washington.

== History ==
A post office called Burke was established in 1907, and remained in operation until 1925. James M. Burke, an early postmaster, gave the community his name.
