= List of U.S. Routes in Washington =

U.S. Routes in Washington
- Highway markers in different years for former U.S. Route 10 (1926), former U.S. Route 99 (1961), and current U.S. Route 101 (1970)

- The state highway system of Washington, with U.S. routes highlighted in red.

System information
- Length: 1,869.9 mi (Note: The mileage is a sum of the lengths listed and cited on this page and includes overlapping sections.) (3,009.3 km)
- Formed: November 11, 1926
- Notes: Maintained by WSDOT

Highway names
- US Highways: U.S. Route nn (US nn)
- Alternate Routes: U.S. Route nn Alternate (US nn Alt)
- Spur Routes: U.S. Route nn Spur (US nn Spur)

System links
- State highways in Washington; Interstate; US; State; Scenic; Pre-1964; 1964 renumbering; Former

The U.S. Routes in Washington are segments of the United States Numbered Highway System that are owned and maintained by the U.S. state of Washington through the Washington State Department of Transportation (WSDOT). The United States Numbered Highway System in Washington covers 1,870 miles (3,009.5 km) and consists of eight highways, divided into four primary routes and four auxiliary routes.

The United States Numbered Highway System was approved and established on November 11, 1926 by the American Association of State Highway Officials (AASHO) and included eleven routes traveling through Washington.

In 1961, the state introduced a set of route markers in Olympia that were colored based on destination and direction rather than route.

== Mainline routes ==
Number	Length (mi)	Length (km)	Southern or western terminus	Northern or eastern terminus	Formed	Removed	Notes
US 2	326.34	525.19	SR 529 in Everett	US 2 in Newport	1946	current	
US 10	306.77	493.70	US 99 in Seattle	US 10 at State Line	1926	1969	Replaced by I-90 and SR 10
US 12	430.52	692.85	US 101 in Aberdeen	US 12 in Clarkston	1967	current	Longest U.S. route in Washington
US 95	0.87	1.40	US 95 near Uniontown	US 95 near Uniontown	1926	1979	Rerouted to bypass Washington; now US 195
US 97	321.60	517.57	US 97 at Maryhill	BC 97 near Oroville	1926	current	
US 99	275.25	442.97	US 99 in Vancouver	BC 99 in Blaine	1926	1969	Replaced by I-5 and SR 99
US 101	365.56	588.31	US 101 at Megler	I-5 in Tumwater	1926	current	
US 195	93.37	150.26	US 195 near Uniontown	I-90/US 2/US 395 in Spokane	1926	current	
US 197	2.76	4.44	US 197 near Dallesport	SR 14 near Dallesport	c. 1952	current	Shortest U.S. route in Washington
US 295	44.34	71.36	US 410 near Pomeroy	US 195 in Colfax	1926	c. 1968	Replaced by SR 127 and SR 26
US 395	275.00	442.57	US 395 near Plymouth	BC 395 at Laurier	1926	current	
US 410	442.63	712.34	US 101 in Aberdeen	US 410 in Clarkston	1926	1967	Replaced by US 12, I-5, and SR 410
US 730	6.08	9.78	US 730 near Wallula	US 12 near Wallula	1926	current	
US 830	204.51	329.13	US 101 at Johnston's Landing	US 97 near Maryhill	1926	c. 1968	Replaced by SR 4, I-5, and SR 14
1.000 mi = 1.609 km; 1.000 km = 0.621 mi

== Special routes ==
Number	Length (mi)	Length (km)	Southern or western terminus	Northern or eastern terminus	Formed	Removed	Notes
US 10 Alt.	—	—	US 10/US 99 in Seattle	US 10 Alt. in Newport	c. 1940	1946	Replaced by US 2
US 10 Alt.	—	—	US 10 in Seattle	US 10 in Issaquah	1940	1955	Replaced by SR 900
US 97 Alt.	39.95	64.29	US 97/US 2 in Sunnyslope	US 97 near Chelan	1987	current	Longest special U.S. route in Washington, serves Entiat and Chelan
US 97 Alt.	—	—	US 97/SSH 3A in Toppenish	US 97 in Union Gap	1955	1973	Replaced by US 97
US 97 Spur	0.26	0.42	US 97 near Orondo	US 2 near Orondo	—	—	Shortest special U.S. route in Washington
US 97 Bus.	—	—	US 97 near Okanogan	US 97/SR 20 near Omak	c. 1967	c. 1973	Replaced by SR 215
US 99 Alt.	—	—	US 99 in Bellingham	BC 13 near Lynden	c. 1954	1969	Replaced by SR 539
US 99 Alt.	—	—	US 99 in Burlington	US 99 in Bellingham	c. 1937	c. 1968	Replaced by SR 11
US 99T	—	—	I-5 in Tukwila	US 99 in Tuwkila	c. 1957	c. 1964	Replaced by SR 599
US 101 Alt.	0.63	1.01	US 101 near Ilwaco	US 101 near Ilwaco	1970	current	Recognized by AASHTO in 2006, bypasses Ilwaco and Seaview
US 101 Truck	—	—	US 101 in Port Angeles	US 101 in Port Angeles	c. 1966	c. 1991	Replaced by SR 117
US 195 Spur	0.54	0.87	US 195 near Uniontown	US 195 Spur near Uniontown	1979	current	Previously part of US 95
US 395 Spur	6.99	11.25	Freya Street near Spokane	US 395 near Mead	proposed	—	Named the North Spokane Corridor freeway, bypasses Spokane
US 730 Spur	0.30	0.48	US 730 near Wallula	US 12 near Wallula	—	—	
1.000 mi = 1.609 km; 1.000 km = 0.621 mi
