= State highways in Washington =

State Highways in Washington
- Standard route signage in Washington

- Map of Washington's highways

System information
- Length: 7,000 mi (11,000 km)
- Notes: Defined by RCW 47.17; maintained by WSDOT

Highway names
- Interstates: Interstate X (I-X)
- US Highways: U.S. Route X (US X)
- State: State Route X (SR X)

System links
- State highways in Washington; Interstate; US; State; Scenic; Pre-1964; 1964 renumbering; Former

The State Highways of Washington in the U.S. state of Washington comprise a network of over 7,000 miles (11,270 km) of state highways, including all Interstate and U.S. Highways that pass through the state, maintained by the Washington State Department of Transportation (WSDOT). The system spans 8.5% of the state's public road mileage, but carries over half of the traffic. All other public roads in the state are either inside incorporated places (cities or towns) or are maintained by the county. The state highway symbol is a white silhouette of George Washington's head (whom the state is named after).

== System description ==
All state highways are designated by the Washington State Legislature and codified in the Revised Code of Washington (RCW), namely Chapter 47.17 RCW. These routes are defined generally by termini and points along the route; WSDOT may otherwise choose the details, and may bypass the designated points as long as the road serves the general vicinity. WSDOT's duties include "locating, designing, constructing, improving, repairing, operating, and maintaining" these state highways, including bridges and other related structures. Within cities and towns, the local governments are responsible for certain aspects of the streets maintained as parts of a state highway, including their grade and the portion not used for highway purposes. All routes, even Interstate and U.S. Highways, are defined as "state route number" plus the number; for instance, Interstate 5 is "state route number 5" and U.S. Route 395 is "state route number 395". Also included in the RCW are "state route number 20 north" (signed as State Route 20 Spur) and "state route number 97-alternate" (signed as U.S. Route 97 Alternate). Some other spurs, such as State Route 503 Spur, are defined as part of the main routes, as is U.S. Route 101 Alternate. WSDOT has also defined some spurs that mainly serve to provide full access between intersecting routes. (Note: The only ones listed in the 2006 log that do not provide such "missing movements" are SR 9 Spur to the truck customs in Sumas and SR 504 Spur and SR 906 Spur to WSDOT maintenance areas.)

Although most state highways as defined by law are open to traffic, State Route 109 dead-ends at Taholah, State Route 501 has a gap in the middle, and State Routes 35, 168, 230, 276, and most of SR 171, 213, and 704, have not been constructed. Notable sections of state highways include the six crossings of the Cascade Range - the Columbia River Gorge (SR 14), White Pass (US 12), Chinook Pass (SR 410), Snoqualmie Pass (I-90), Stevens Pass (US 2), and the North Cascades Highway (SR 20). Of the 13 public road crossings of the Canada–US border in Washington, nine are on state highways. Major bridges include the Tacoma Narrows Bridge and three floating bridges: the Evergreen Point Bridge, Hood Canal Bridge, and Lake Washington Bridge. The Washington State Ferries, except the route to Sidney, British Columbia, were legally included in the state highway system in 1994; a new State Route 339 was created at that time for the passenger-only Seattle-Vashon Ferry. According to the Washington State Department of Licensing, ocean beaches are legally state highways with a general speed limit of 25 mph (40 km/h), many only open to vehicles between the day after Labor Day and April 14, but state law places the beaches under the control of the Washington State Parks and Recreation Commission and only designates them as "public highways".

Most state routes are numbered in a grid, with even-numbered routes running east–west and odd-numbered routes running north–south. (Note: Only SR 501, SR 523, SR 531, and SR 548 run in a perpendicular direction.) Even two-digit routes increase from south to north in three "strips", with SR 4, SR 6, and SR 8 in the western part of the state, SR 14, SR 16, SR 18, and SR 20 along the Interstate 5 corridor, and SR 22, SR 24, SR 26, SR 28, and former SR 30 in the east. Odd numbers similarly increase from west to east, with SR 3, Interstate 5, SR 7, SR 9, SR 11, SR 17, SR 21, SR 23, SR 25, SR 27, and SR 31 following this general progression. (SR 19 was added in 1991, and lies west of SR 3; SR 35 and SR 41 are extensions of highways in adjacent states.) Three-digit routes (and SR 92 and SR 96) are usually numbered by taking the first one or two digits of a route it connects to and adding another digit or two. In some cases, instead of using the two-digit route's actual number, a number that would fit the grid is used instead. Three-digit routes have been numbered as follows:

| Main | Branches | Notes |
|---|---|---|
| SR 9 | 92, 96 | |
| US 101 | 100-119 | |
| SR 11 | 110 | Only existed from 1967 to 1975; SR 110 has since been re-applied to a spur of US 101 |
| US 12 | 121-131 | |
| US 830, SR 12, US 410 | 120-129 | Only existed from 1964 to 1967, when US 830 and SR 12 became SR 14 and US 410 became US 12 |
| US 97 | 131 | Fits in the grid as SR 13; only existed from 1964 to 1975, when US 97 replaced SR 131; SR 131 has since been re-applied to a spur of US 12 |
| SR 14 | 140-143 | |
| SR 14 | 141-143 | Only existed from 1964 to 1967, when SR 14 became US 12 |
| US 97 | 150-155 | Fits in the grid as SR 15 |
| SR 16, SR 410 | 160-169 | |
| SR 17 | 170-174 | |
| SR 18 | 181 | |
| US 195 | 193-194 | |
| US 2 | 202-209 | |
| SR 20 | 211-215, 237 | SR 237 replaced SR 537 in 1975 after SR 20 replaced part of SR 536. SR 237 was then decommissioned in 1991. |
| SR 22 | 220-225 | |
| SR 23 | 230-232 | |
| SR 24 | 240-243 | |
| SR 25 | 251 | |
| SR 26 | 260-263 | |
| SR 27 | 270-278 | |
| SR 28 | 281-285 | |
| US 395 | 290-294 | Fits in the grid as SR 29 |
| SR 3 | 300-310, 339 | |
| SR 31 | 311 | SR 311 became SR 211 in 1975 after SR 20 replaced part of SR 31 |
| US 395 | 397 | |
| SR 4 | 401-409, 411, 431-433 | 431-433 replaced 831-833 in 1967 when SR 4 replaced US 830 |
| I-5 | 500-548, 599 | |
| SR 6 | 603 | |
| SR 7 | 702-706 | |
| SR 8 | 801 | Only existed from 1964 to 1967, when SR 8 became part of US 12 and SR 801 became SR 121 |
| I-82 | 821-823 | |
| US 830 | 831-833 | Only existed from 1964 to 1967, when US 830 became SR 4 and 831-833 became 431-433 |
| I-90 | 900-908, 920 | |
| US 97 | 970-971 | |

== History ==
Washington's first connected state highway system, 1913

After passing several early laws designating state roads starting in 1893, the Washington State Legislature created the State Highway Board in 1905 and appropriated funds to construct - but not maintain - twelve numbered "state roads" in sparsely settled areas of the state. (Main highways in more populated areas would continue to be entirely under county control, though sometimes built with 50% state aid.) Six of these highways were east–west crossings of the Cascades; others included a portion of Chuckanut Drive and a road around the west side of the Olympic Peninsula. Under a 1909 law, the State Highway Board surveyed a connected network of proposed state roads, The legislature added most of these routes to the state highway system in 1913, when they formed a two-tiered system of primary and secondary roads. Primary roads were completely controlled by the state, including maintenance, and received only names, while secondary roads kept their numbers and county maintenance. Unlike the earlier state roads, these primary roads mostly followed existing passable county roads.

A 1923 restructuring of the system reassigned numbers to almost all the primary state highways, which were soon marked on signs. In 1937, the old primary/secondary split was abolished, and a new system of primary and secondary state highways was created, all to be maintained by the state in the same manner. The old state roads all kept their numbers as new primary state highways, and secondary state highways were created as alphanumeric branches of those primary highways (for instance SSH 8D was a branch of PSH 8). The final renumbering was authorized by law in 1963 and posted in January 1964, when new "sign route" numbers were assigned that matched the inter-state systems and otherwise formed the present grid. Until 1970, these numbers coexisted with the older primary and secondary state highways, when the legislature adopted the sign route numbers as "state routes", finally eliminating all vestiges of the 1905 numbering. (Note: For example, SR 4 from 1905 kept its number as PSH 4 until 1970.)

The state legislature adopted new standards for designating state highways in 1990, following a three-year study from the Road Jurisdiction Committee. Among the changes were recommending highways serving state parks and ferry terminals be added to the system. A major restructure was passed by the legislature in 1991 and took effect on April 1, 1992.
