= Prescott, Washington =

City in Washington, United States

Prescott
- City
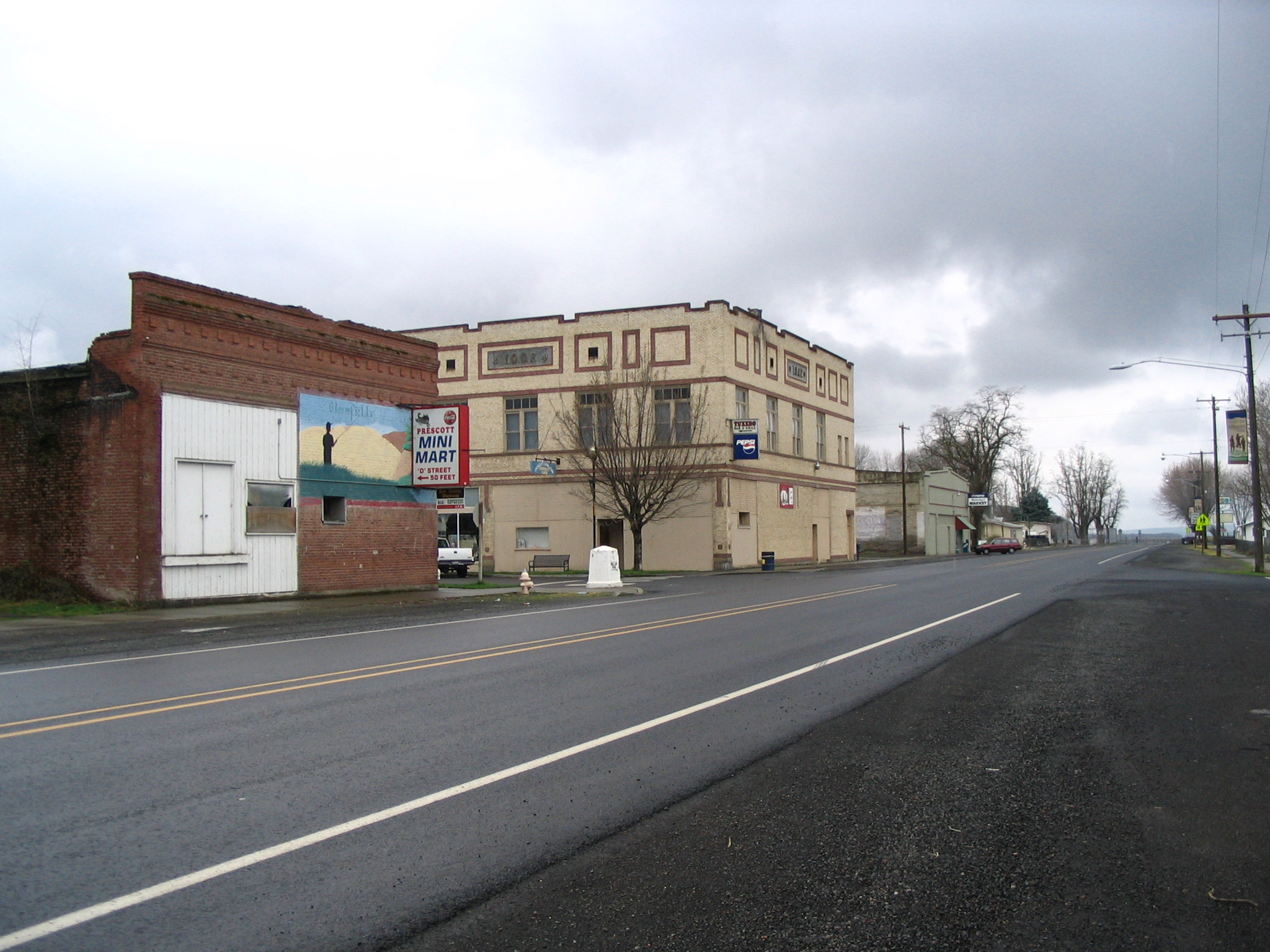
- Main intersection in Prescott

- Location of Prescott, Washington
- Coordinates: 46°17′56″N 118°18′45″W
- Country: United States
- State: Washington
- County: Walla Walla

Government
  - Type: Mayor–council
  - Mayor: Jay Potts

Area
  - Total: 0.40 sq mi (1.03 km^{2})
  - Land: 0.40 sq mi (1.03 km^{2})
  - Water: 0 sq mi (0.00 km^{2})
- Elevation: 1,047 ft (319 m)

Population (2020)
  - Total: 372
  - Density: 935/sq mi (361/km^{2})
- Time zone: UTC-8 (Pacific (PST))
  - Summer (DST): UTC-7 (PDT)
- ZIP code: 99348
- Area code: 509
- FIPS code: 53-56240
- GNIS feature ID: 2412506
- Website: www.cityofprescottwa.com

Prescott is a city in central Walla Walla County, Washington. The population was 372 at the 2020 census.

== History ==
A post office called Prescott has been in operation since 1881. The city was named after C.H. Prescott, a railroad official.

Prescott was officially incorporated on March 13, 1903.

== Geography ==
According to the United States Census Bureau, the city has a total area of 0.40 square miles (1.04 km^{2}), all of it land.

=== Climate ===
According to the Köppen Climate Classification system, Prescott has a semi-arid climate, abbreviated "BSk" on climate maps.

== Demographics ==
Historical population
Census	Pop.	Note	%±
1890	313		—
1900	657		109.9%
1910	502		−23.6%
1920	559		11.4%
1930	275		−50.8%
1940	324		17.8%
1950	244		−24.7%
1960	269		10.2%
1970	242		−10.0%
1980	341		40.9%
1990	267		−21.7%
2000	314		17.6%
2010	318		1.3%
2020	372		17.0%
U.S. Decennial Census; 2015 Estimate

=== 2020 census ===
As of the 2020 census, Prescott had a population of 372. The median age was 40.0 years. 26.6% of residents were under the age of 18 and 15.1% of residents were 65 years of age or older. For every 100 females there were 117.5 males, and for every 100 females age 18 and over there were 103.7 males age 18 and over.

0.0% of residents lived in urban areas, while 100.0% lived in rural areas.

There were 139 households in Prescott, of which 33.8% had children under the age of 18 living in them. Of all households, 43.2% were married-couple households, 22.3% were households with a male householder and no spouse or partner present, and 21.6% were households with a female householder and no spouse or partner present. About 22.3% of all households were made up of individuals and 12.3% had someone living alone who was 65 years of age or older.

There were 152 housing units, of which 8.6% were vacant. The homeowner vacancy rate was 5.3% and the rental vacancy rate was 0.0%.

Racial composition as of the 2020 census
Race	Number	Percent
White	322	86.6%
Black or African American	2	0.5%
American Indian and Alaska Native	5	1.3%
Asian	5	1.3%
Native Hawaiian and Other Pacific Islander	0	0.0%
Some other race	10	2.7%
Two or more races	28	7.5%
Hispanic or Latino (of any race)	36	9.7%

=== 2010 census ===
At the 2010 census there were 318 people in 136 households, including 84 families, in the city. The population density was 795.0 inhabitants per square mile (307.0/km^{2}). There were 156 housing units at an average density of 390.0 units per square mile (150.6 units/km^{2}). The racial makeup of the city was 89.9% White, 0.6% African American, 0.9% Native American, 6.0% from other races, and 2.5% from two or more races. Hispanic or Latino of any race were 9.4%.

Of the 136 households 30.1% had children under the age of 18 living with them, 44.9% were married couples living together, 10.3% had a female householder with no husband present, 6.6% had a male householder with no wife present, and 38.2% were non-families. 28.7% of households were one person and 9.6% were one person aged 65 or older. The average household size was 2.34 and the average family size was 2.90.

The median age was 44.8 years. 23.3% of residents were under the age of 18; 8.5% were between the ages of 18 and 24; 18.6% were from 25 to 44; 35.5% were from 45 to 64; and 14.2% were 65 or older. The gender makeup of the city was 50.3% male and 49.7% female.

=== 2000 census ===
At the 2000 census, there were 314 people in 123 households, including 87 families, in the city. The population density was 919.9 people per square mile (355.2 people/km^{2}). There were 152 housing units at an average density of 445.3 units per square mile (171.9 units/km^{2}). The racial makeup of the city was 94.59% White, 0.32% African American, 0.96% Native American, 1.59% from other races, and 2.55% from two or more races. Hispanic or Latino of any race were 4.14% of the population.

Of the 123 households 36.6% had children under the age of 18 living with them, 54.5% were married couples living together, 11.4% had a female householder with no husband present, and 28.5% were non-families. 22.8% of households were one person and 5.7% were one person aged 65 or older. The average household size was 2.55 and the average family size was 3.01.

In the city, the age distribution of the population shows 27.4% under the age of 18, 5.4% from 18 to 24, 32.2% from 25 to 44, 22.6% from 45 to 64, and 12.4% 65 or older. The median age was 38 years. For every 100 females, there were 127.5 males. For every 100 females age 18 and over, there were 107.3 males.

The median household income was $39,500 and the median family income was $47,708. Males had a median income of $34,750 versus $23,250 for females. The per capita income for the city was $16,931. About 13.8% of families and 18.4% of the population were below the poverty line, including 24.4% of those under age 18 and 10.3% of those age 65 or over.
