= Burbank, Washington =

- CDP
- Location of Burbank, Washington
- Coordinates: 46°12′14″N 119°00′02″W
- Country: United States
- State: Washington
- County: Walla Walla

Area
  - CDP: 15.0 sq mi (38.8 km^{2})
  - Land: 13.3 sq mi (34.4 km^{2})
  - Water: 1.7 sq mi (4.4 km^{2})
- Elevation: 341 ft (104 m)

Population (2020)
  - CDP: 3,499
  - Density: 263/sq mi (102/km^{2})
  - Urban: 210,975 (US: 171st)
  - Metro: 64,614 (US: 379th)
- Time zone: UTC-8 (Pacific (PST))
  - Summer (DST): UTC-7 (PDT)
- ZIP code: 99323
- Area code: 509
- FIPS code: 53-08780
- GNIS feature ID: 2407925

Burbank is a census-designated place (CDP) in Walla Walla County, Washington, United States, where the Snake River meets the Columbia. As of the 2020 census, Burbank had a population of 3,499. Named for Luther Burbank, the city is located just east of Pasco and Kennewick, across the Snake and Columbia Rivers, respectively. Burbank is part of the Tri-Cities, WA urban area, despite being located in the Walla Walla metropolitan area (which includes all of Walla Walla and Columbia counties).

== Geography ==
According to the United States Census Bureau, the CDP has a total area of 15.0 square miles (39 km^{2}), of which, 13.3 square miles (34 km^{2}) of it is land and 1.7 square miles (4.4 km^{2}) of it (11.36%) is water.

== History ==
Originally home to the Walla Walla tribe, who lived at the confluence of the Snake and the Columbia rivers. Meriwether Lewis and William Clark passed through the location October 16, 1805 on their way to the Pacific Ocean.

A town was founded in 1907 along the river. It was named by the Northern Pacific Railway for Burbank Power & Water Company, which had been named for the famous horticulturist Luther Burbank.

A bridge built in 1921 over the Snake River connected the community with Pasco. This bridge burned in 1949, and was rebuilt in 1952.

=== Climate ===
According to the Köppen Climate Classification system, Burbank has a semi-arid climate, abbreviated "BSk" on climate maps.

== Demographics ==
Historical population
Census	Pop.	Note	%±
1990	1,745		—
2000	3,303		89.3%
2010	3,291		−0.4%
2020	3,499		6.3%
U.S. Decennial Census; 1970 1980 1990; 2000 2010

Burbank first appeared as a census designated place in the 1990 U.S. census.

=== Racial and ethnic composition ===
Burbank CDP, Washington – Racial and ethnic composition Note: the US Census treats Hispanic/Latino as an ethnic category. This table excludes Latinos from the racial categories and assigns them to a separate category. Hispanics/Latinos may be of any race.
Race / Ethnicity (NH = Non-Hispanic)	Pop 2000	Pop 2010	Pop 2020	% 2000	% 2010	% 2020
White alone (NH)	2,855	2,698	2,499	86.44%	81.98%	71.42%
Black or African American alone (NH)	10	25	18	0.30%	0.76%	0.51%
Native American or Alaska Native alone (NH)	25	23	30	0.76%	0.70%	0.86%
Asian alone (NH)	12	6	22	0.36%	0.18%	0.63%
Native Hawaiian or Pacific Islander alone (NH)	4	2	4	0.12%	0.06%	0.11%
Other race alone (NH)	2	4	9	0.06%	0.12%	0.26%
Mixed race or Multiracial (NH)	67	50	123	2.03%	1.52%	3.52%
Hispanic or Latino (any race)	328	483	794	9.93%	14.68%	22.69%
Total	3,303	3,291	3,499	100.00%	100.00%	100.00%

=== 2000 census ===
As of the census of 2000, there were 3,303 people, 1,089 households, and 908 families residing in the CDP. The population density was 249.0 people per square mile (96.1 people/km^{2}). There were 1,124 housing units at an average density of 84.7 units per square mile (32.7 units/km^{2}). The racial makeup of the CDP was 90.16% White, 0.30% African American, 0.82% Native American, 0.36% Asian, 0.12% Pacific Islander, 5.81% from other races, and 2.42% from two or more races. Hispanic or Latino of any race were 9.93% of the population.

There were 1,089 households, out of which 41.7% had children under the age of 18 living with them, 71.7% were married couples living together, 7.3% had a female householder with no husband present, and 16.6% were non-families. 13.1% of all households were made up of individuals, and 5.3% had someone living alone who was 65 years of age or older. The average household size was 3.03 and the average family size was 3.29.

In the CDP, the age distribution of the population shows 31.1% under the age of 18, 7.6% from 18 to 24, 28.8% from 25 to 44, 24.6% from 45 to 64, and 8.0% who were 65 years of age or older. The median age was 35 years. For every 100 females, there were 100.2 males. For every 100 females age 18 and over, there were 100.5 males.

The median income for a household in the CDP was $50,522, and the median income for a family was $52,146. Males had a median income of $40,343 versus $28,580 for females. The per capita income for the CDP was $17,105. About 3.4% of families and 6.5% of the population were below the poverty line, including 11.5% of those under age 18 and none of those age 65 or over.

== Notable residents ==
- Chuck Palahniuk, author
