= U.S. Route 830 =

Former U.S. Highway in Washington, United States

U.S. Route 830

Route information
- Maintained by Washington Dept. of Highways
- Length: 209 mi (336 km)
- Existed: 1926–1968

Major junctions
- West end: US 101 / PSH 12 in Johnson's Landing
- US 99 / PSH 1 in Kelso; US 99 in Vancouver
- East end: US 97 / PSH 8 in Maryhill

Location
- Country: United States
- State: Washington
- Counties: Pacific, Wahkiakum, Cowlitz, Clark, Skamania, Klickitat

Highway system
- United States Numbered Highway System; List; Special; Divided; State highways in Washington; Interstate; US; State; Scenic; Pre-1964; 1964 renumbering; Former
← SR 823	→ SR 900

U.S. Route 830 (US 830) was a U.S. Highway in Washington, which ran between a junction with US 97 near the city of Maryhill and a junction with US 101 near Naselle. The route still (mostly) exists; however it is currently signed as State Route 14 (SR 14) between Maryhill and Vancouver, Interstate 5 (I-5) between Vancouver and Longview, SR 432 for a short stretch through Longview; and SR 4 from Longview to the western terminus near Naselle. The number suggests that US 830 was an auxiliary route of US 30. While US 30 and US 830 never connected, they ran parallel to each other for the entire length of US 830. This route ran on the northern bank of the Columbia River (through Washington) whereas US 30 runs on the river's southern bank, through Oregon.

== History ==
US 830 was created in 1926 as part of the initial set of United States Numbered Highways, running from US 101 at Megler to US 97 near Maryhill. It was 232 miles (373 km) in 1932. When it existed, US 830 was the highest-numbered route in the U.S. Highway System (and remains the highest U.S. route number ever used). The highest numbered route still in existence is US 730.

The stretch of (former) US 830 which is now I-5 ran concurrently with US 99 at one point. The stretch of US 830 between Maryhill and Dalleport was formerly concurrent with US 197 from 1952 onward; now Dallesport is the northern terminus of US 197.

US 830 was decommissioned in 1968 and was replaced by SR 4, I‑5, and SR 14.

== Major intersections ==
County	Location	mi	km	Destinations	Notes
Pacific		81.82 (Note: Mileposts from PSH 12)	131.68	US 101 / PSH 12 – Seaview, Raymond	Western terminus
Pacific		87.15	140.25	SSH 12-B south – Naselle, Knappton–Astoria Ferry	Connects to US 30 in Astoria; car and driver toll was $1 (in 1941, $21 in 2024)
Wahkiakum		97.64	157.14	SSH 12-C south – Eden, Altoona	
Wahkiakum		117.57	189.21	SSH 12-D north	
Cowlitz	Kelso	145.03	233.40	US 99 / PSH 1 – Portland, Tacoma, Seattle	Western end of US 99 concurrency
Cowlitz	Woodland	21.16 (Note: Mileposts from PSH 1)	34.05	SSH 1-S east – Cougar, Battle Ground	
Clark		14.17	22.80	SSH 1-T west – Ridgefield	
Clark		9.26	14.90	SSH 1-S east – Battle Ground	
Clark	Vancouver	1.52	2.45	SSH 8-A east – Orchards	
Clark	Vancouver	1.06	1.71	SSH 1-T west – Sara	
Clark	Vancouver	0.00 (Note: Mileposts from PSH 8)	0.00	US 99 south / PSH 8 east – Portland	Eastern end of concurrency with US 99
Clark	Camas	13.79	22.19	SSH 8-A north – Sifton	
Clark	Washougal	16.16	26.01	SSH 8-B north	
Skamania		25.80	41.52	SSH 8-B north	
Skamania		47.19	75.94	SSH 8-C north – Carson	
Klickitat		66.06	106.31	SSH 8-D north – Town Lake	
Klickitat		83.42	134.25	US 197 south – Dallesport	Western end of US 197 concurrency
Klickitat	Maryhill	100.92	162.41	US 97 north / PSH 8 – Goldendale, Toppenish	Eastern terminus; eastern end of US 197 concurrency
1.000 mi = 1.609 km; 1.000 km = 0.621 mi: Concurrency terminus

== See also ==
- List of United States Numbered Highways
