= Washington State Route 140 =

State highway in southwestern Washington, US

State Route 140
- Washougal River Road
- Former route of SR 140 highlighted in red.

Route information
- Auxiliary route of SR 14
- Maintained by WSDOT
- Length: 14.08 mi (22.66 km)
- Existed: 1968–1992

Major junctions
- West end: SR 14 in Washougal
- East end: SR 14 in Prindle

Location
- Country: United States
- State: Washington
- Counties: Clark, Skamania

Highway system
- State highways in Washington; Interstate; US; State; Scenic; Pre-1964; 1964 renumbering; Former
← SR 131	→ SR 141

State Route 140 (SR 140) was a state highway in Clark and Skamania counties in southwestern Washington. The highway began and ended at SR 14 in Washougal and Prindle, respectively, and followed the Washougal River and Canyon Creek. The roadway first appeared as Canyon Creek Road in a 1911 map and was designated Secondary State Highway 8B (SSH 8B) in 1937. SSH 8B was a spur route of Primary State Highway 8 (PSH 8), which became SR 12 in the 1964 highway renumbering. SR 120 replaced SSH 8B in the same renumbering and SR 12 was renumbered in 1967 to SR 14 after U.S. Route 12 was extended into Washington. SR 120 was also renumbered to SR 140, decommissioned in 1992.

== Route description ==
State Route 140 (SR 140) originated as 15th Street at an intersection with SR 14 in Washougal, located about 1.47 miles (2.37 km) east of the eastern terminus of SR 500 on the shoreline of the Columbia River. 15th Street traveled north through Downtown, crossing the Vancouver–White Salmon rail route of the BNSF Railway and intersecting the former alignment of SR 14, E Street, before turning northeastward onto 17th Street. The highway crossed the Washougal River out of Washougal in a large forest and became the Washougal River Road. The roadway paralleled the river northeast and later east into the forests and mountains of Skamania County until the river turned north. SR 140, renamed Canyon Creek Road, turned southeast and encountered a series of sharp turns until terminating at SR 14 in Prindle.

== History ==
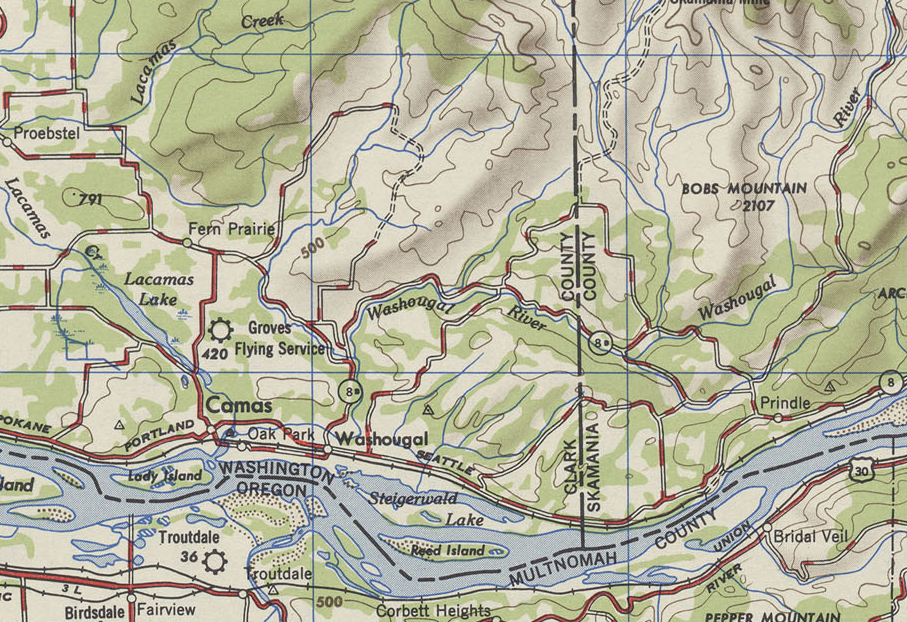
A 1949 map of the Vancouver area featuring Secondary State Highway 8B (SSH 8B), the early predecessor to SR 120 and SR 140 was designated between 1937 and 1964.

SR 140 began as Canyon Creek Road and first appeared on a map in 1911. The first numbered highway on the road was Secondary State Highway 8B (SSH 8B), established in 1937. The roadway traveled along the Washougal River and Canyon Creek between Primary State Highway 8 (PSH 8), co-signed as U.S. Route 830 (US 830), between Washougal and Prindle. SSH 8B remained unchanged until the 1964 highway renumbering, when the route was renumbered as State Route 120 and PSH 8 became State Route 12. After US 12 was extended west across Washington in 1967, SR 12 became SR 14 and SR 120 became SR 140. In 1968, US 830 was deleted and SR 14 was realigned south onto a newer alignment. In 1992, SR 140 was removed from the state highway system.

== Major intersections ==
County	Location	mi	km	Destinations	Notes
Clark	Washougal	0.00	0.00	SR 14 west (Lewis and Clark Highway) – Camas, Vancouver	Western terminus
Clark	Washougal	0.00	0.00	E Street / Evergreen Boulevard	Former SR 14
Skamania	Prindle	14.08	22.66	SR 14 east (Lewis and Clark Highway) – Stevenson, Dallesport	Eastern terminus
1.000 mi = 1.609 km; 1.000 km = 0.621 mi
