= Skamania, Washington =

Unincorporated community in Washington, United States

- Unincorporated community
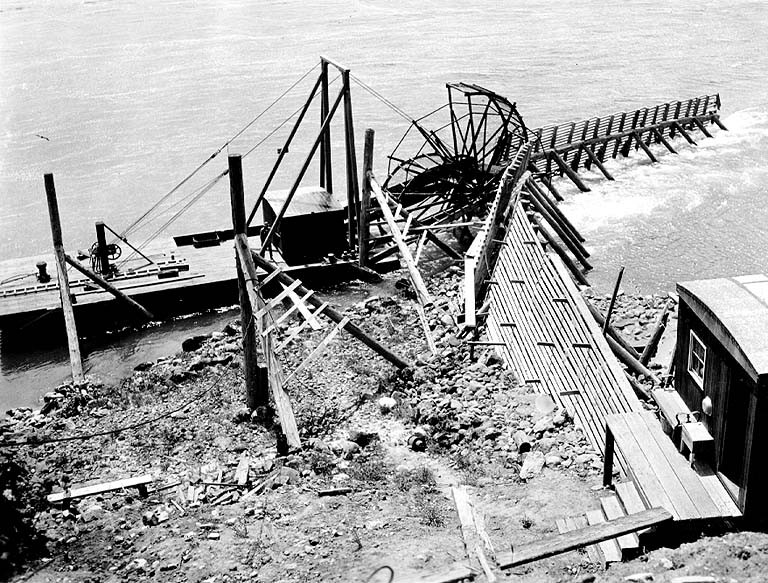
- Fish wheel on a scow near Skamania on the Columbia River, June 1924

- Location within Washington (state) Location within the United States
- Coordinates: 45°37′02″N 122°02′30″W
- Country: United States
- State: Washington
- County: Skamania
- Elevation: 102 ft (31 m)
- Time zone: UTC-8 (Pacific (PST))
  - Summer (DST): UTC-7 (PDT)
- GNIS feature ID: 1508378

Skamania is a small unincorporated community in Skamania County in the southwestern part of the U.S. state of Washington.

== History ==
The Stevenson area has been home to Native American settlements for thousands of years. Their villages were focal points for commerce and social gatherings as they came to trade and fish along the riverbanks. Some of the first explorers and missionaries in the area included Lewis & Clark, David Thompson and Dr. Spaulding. They used the Columbia River to get through the Cascade Mountains on their way to the Pacific Ocean. In 1843, the Oregon Trail brought the first settlers there. Pioneers portaged around the Cascade Rapids on their way to the Willamette Valley. Some of these pioneering families chose to stay there. The Stevenson family, who settled there in the 1800s from Missouri, founded the town of Stevenson on the old Shepard donation land claim. Under the supervision of the Stevenson Land Company, George Stevenson purchased the original town site for $24,000 in 1893, building the town along the lower flat near the river. Settlers expanded the original dock to serve the daily arrivals of sternwheelers unloading passengers, cargo and loading logs.

== Geography ==
Skamania is located within the Columbia River Gorge National Scenic Area on Washington State Route 14. The community lies between Prindle to the west and North Bonneville to the east.

== Parks and recreation ==
Beacon Rock State Park is located east of Skamania. The town is also near the Sams Walker Day Use Site, which is maintained by the US Forest Service. The community is sandwiched between Pierce National Wildlife Refuge and Franz Lake National Wildlife Refuge, home to wintering grounds for tundra swans and 35 acres (140,000 m^{2}) of wapato, previously extinct in Washington and endangered in Oregon, now scarce but stable in both states.

== Education ==
Young students attend Skamania Elementary School.
