= Tygh Grade Summit =

Mountain pass in Oregon, United States

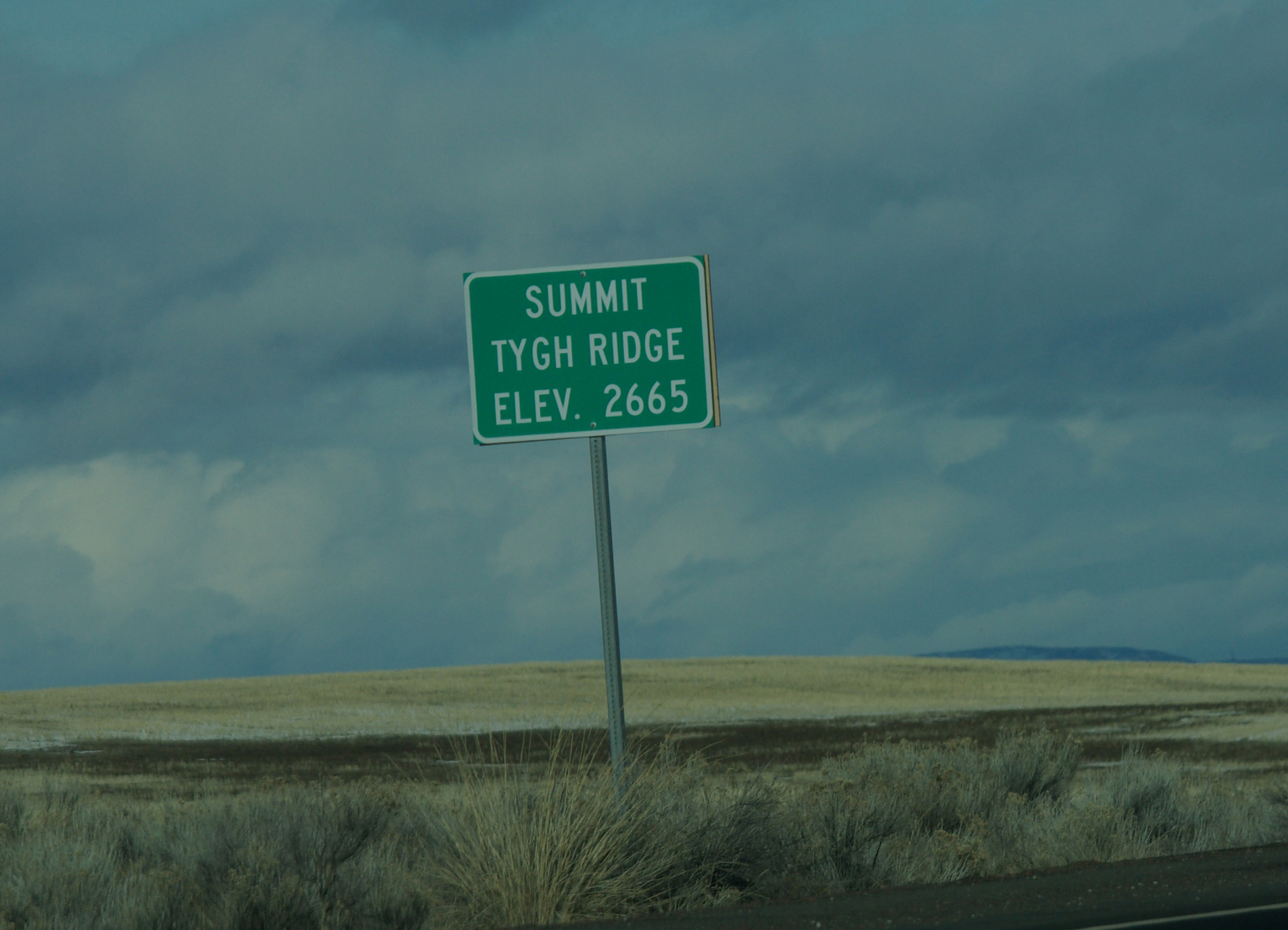
- Interactive map of Tygh Grade Summit
- Elevation: 2,697 ft (822 m)
- Traversed by: US 197

Third Approach
- Location: Wasco County, Oregon, United States
- Coordinates: 45.3249°N 121.15034°W

Tygh Grade Summit (el. 2697 ft.) is a mountain pass in Oregon traversed by U.S. Route 197 and is located about 6.5 miles north of Tygh Valley.
