= U.S. Route 197 =

Highway in Oregon and Washington

U.S. Route 197
- US 197 highlighted in red

Route information
- Auxiliary route of US 97
- Maintained by ODOT and WSDOT
- Length: 69.93 mi (Note: Total mileage is a summation of the state mileages.) (112.54 km)
- Existed: 1952–present

Major junctions
- South end: US 97 near Shaniko, OR
- OR 216 near Maupin, OR; I-84 / US 30 in The Dalles, OR
- North end: SR 14 near Dallesport, WA

Location
- Country: United States
- States: Oregon, Washington
- Counties: OR: Wasco; WA: Klickitat

Highway system
- United States Numbered Highway System; List; Special; Divided
- Oregon Highways; Interstate; US; State; Named; Scenic
- State highways in Washington; Interstate; US; State; Scenic; Pre-1964; 1964 renumbering; Former
← OR 194	OR	→ US 199
← US 195	WA	→ SR 202

U.S. Route 197 (US 197) is a north–south United States Highway, of which all but 2.76 miles of its 69.93 miles (4.44 of 112.54 km) are within the state of Oregon. The highway starts in rural Wasco County in Central Oregon at an intersection with US 97. US 197 travels north as a continuation of The Dalles-California Highway No. 4 through the cities of Maupin, Tygh Valley, and Dufur to The Dalles. Within The Dalles, the highway becomes concurrent with US 30 and intersects Interstate 84 (I-84) before it crosses over the Columbia River on The Dalles Bridge into Washington. The highway continues through the neighboring city of Dallesport in Klickitat County and terminates at a junction with State Route 14 (SR 14).

US 197 was established in 1952 using the existing The Dalles-California Highway, itself created as a part of the initial named Oregon highways in 1917. US 197 traveled from its current northern terminus at Dallesport to US 97 in Maryhill along Primary State Highway 8 (PSH 8) and US 830, successors to the original State Road 8 designated along the corridor in 1907. The Dallesport–Maryhill section was transferred to SR 14 in 1979, but was not recognized by the American Association of State Highway and Transportation Officials (AASHTO) until 2006.

== Route description ==
US 197 runs 69.93 miles (112.54 km) in Oregon and Washington and is maintained by the Oregon Department of Transportation (ODOT) and Washington State Department of Transportation (WSDOT).

=== Oregon ===
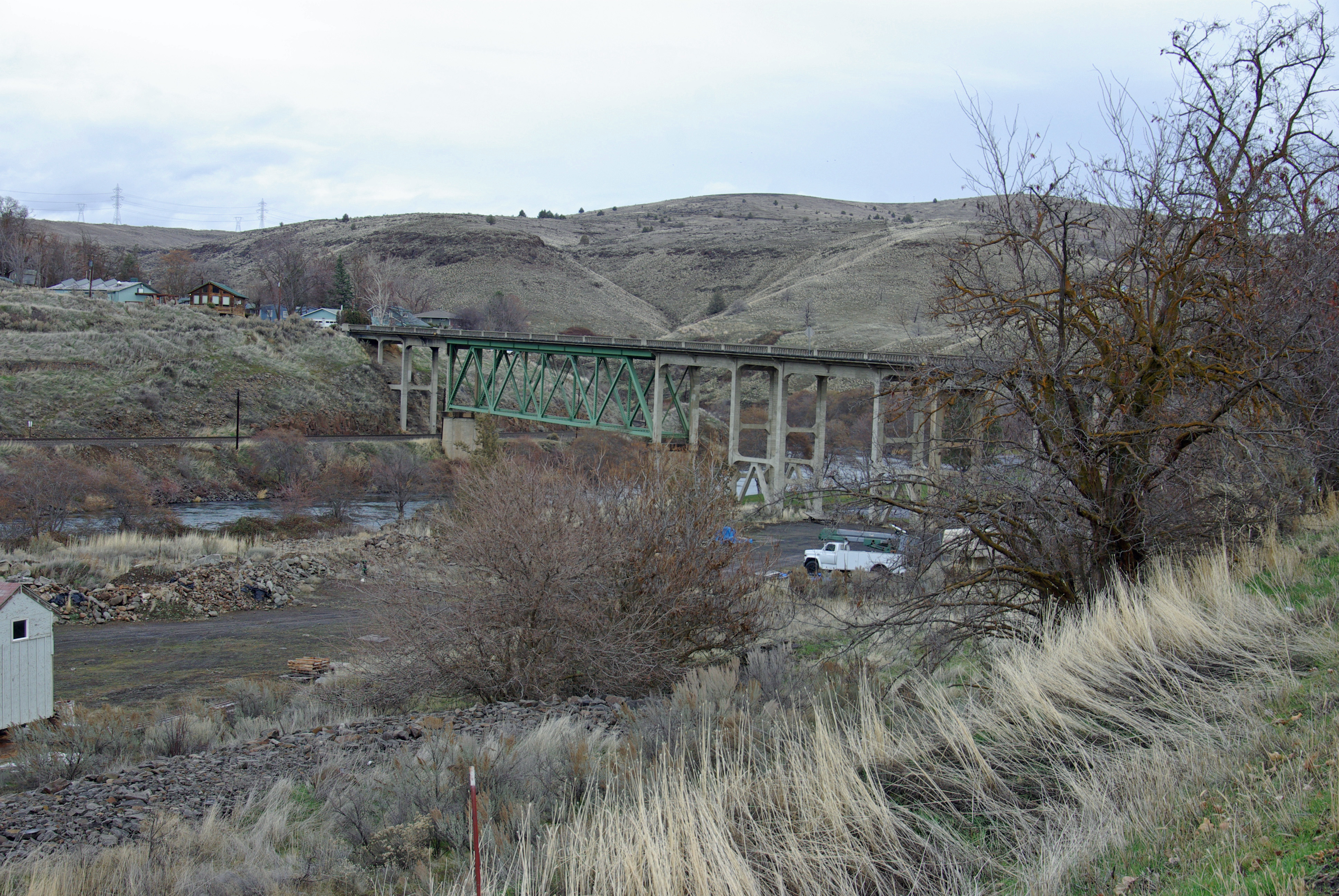
US 197 crossing the Deschutes River into Maupin in rural Wasco County

US 197 begins at an intersection with US 97 at Shaniko Junction in Wasco County, located between the cities of Madras and Shaniko in Central Oregon. The highway, a continuation of The Dalles-California Highway No. 4, travels northwest over the 3,363-foot-high (1,025 m) Criterion Summit and down along Stag Canyon through the community of Criterion towards Maupin. US 197 crosses the Deschutes River and a BNSF rail line on a warren truss bridge, becoming Deschutes Avenue as it passes South Wasco County High School and through the city of Maupin. The highway continues west into the Juniper Flat and intersects Oregon Route 216 (OR 216), designated as Wapinitia Highway No. 44, and forms a concurrency. US 197 and OR 216 travel north and northwest to Tygh Valley, where OR 216 leaves the concurrency and heads east on Sherars Bridge Highway No. 290 towards Grass Valley. The lone highway continues north up Butler Canyon onto Tygh Ridge, passing through the 2,710-foot-high (830 m) Tygh Grade Summit. US 197 travels east of Dufur and down into the Columbia River Gorge, entering the city of The Dalles. The highway begins a 0.24-mile-long (0.39 km) concurrency with US 30, traveling north over an east–west BNSF rail line to a diamond interchange with I-84. US 197 leaves the interchange and the state of Oregon on The Dalles Bridge, crossing over the Columbia River into Washington. An ODOT survey measuring traffic volume for any average day of the year, expressed in terms of annual average daily traffic (AADT), was conducted in 2011 on US 197 and calculated that the busiest section of the highway in Oregon was on The Dalles Bridge, serving 5,800 vehicles, while the least busiest section of the highway was north of its terminus at US 97, serving 390 vehicles.

=== Washington ===
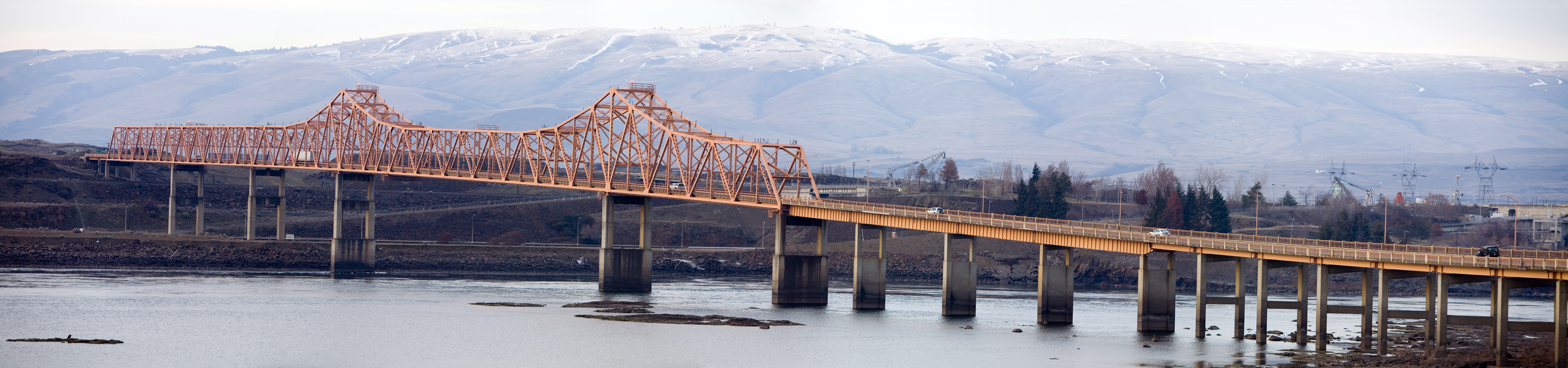
US 197 is carried by The Dalles Bridge over the Columbia River into Washington

US 197 enters Washington on The Dalles Bridge, a steel cantilever truss bridge that crosses the Columbia River downstream of The Dalles Dam, and travels into Dallesport in Klickitat County. The highway continues north for 2.76 miles (4.44 km) past Columbia Gorge Regional Airport to its northern terminus, an intersection with SR 14. US 197 is defined by the Washington State Legislature as SR 197, part of the Revised Code of Washington as §47.17.382. Every year, WSDOT conducts a series of surveys on its highways in the state to measure traffic volume, expressed in terms of AADT. In 2012, WSDOT calculated that the Washington section of US 197 served between 3,700 and 6,100 vehicles, mostly on The Dalles Bridge.

== History ==
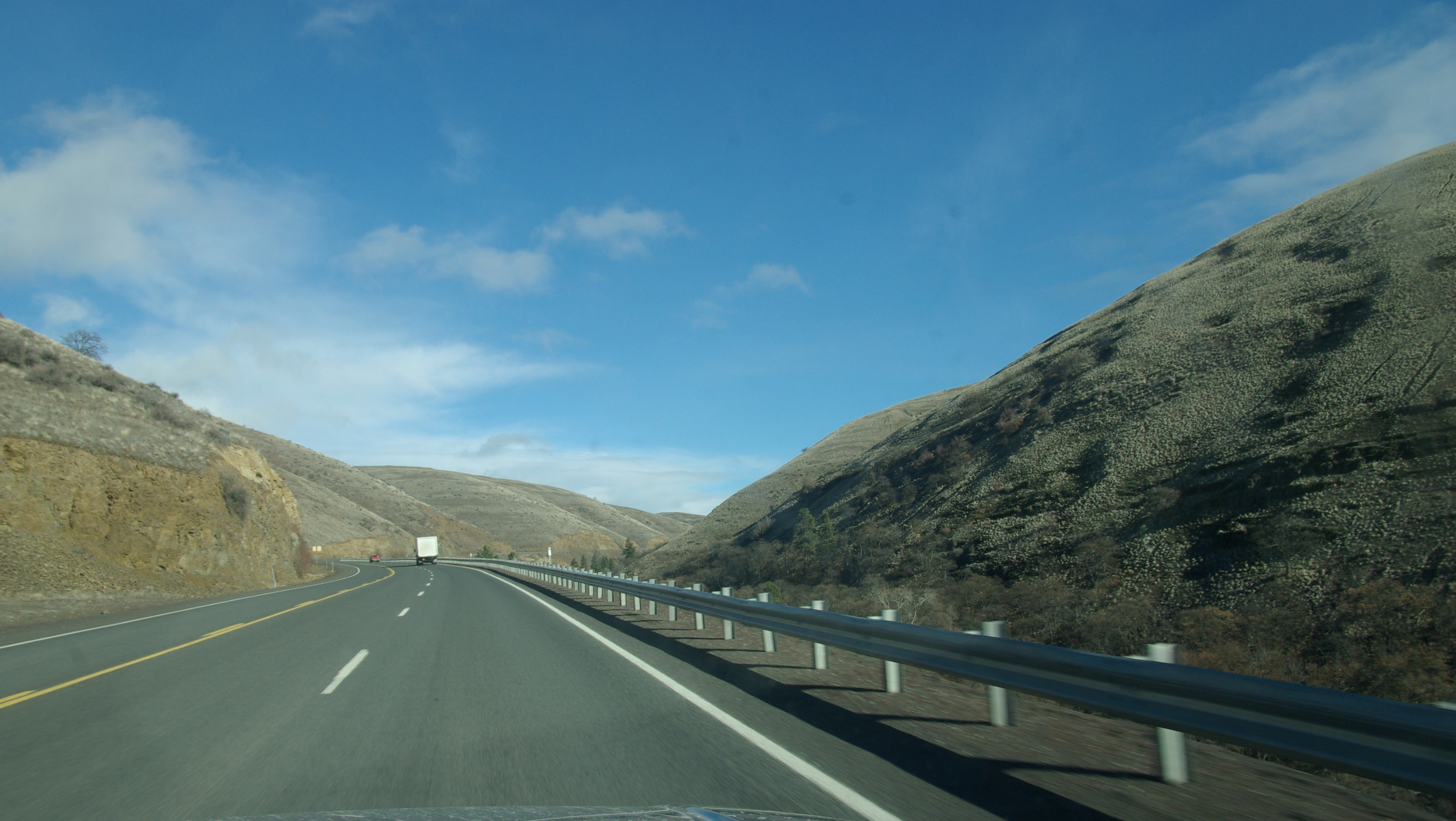
US 197 northbound on Tygh Grade between Tygh Valley and Dufur

US 197 within Washington was added to the state highway system in 1907 as State Road 8, later designated as PSH 8 in 1937, traveling east along the Columbia River from Vancouver to Maryhill. US 197 within Oregon is designated as a segment of The Dalles-California Highway No. 4, created as part of the initial named state highway system, adopted by the Oregon State Highway Commission on November 27, 1917. The highway traveled south from The Dalles through Central Oregon to the California state line south of Klamath Falls. Under the United States Numbered Highway system, approved by the American Association of State Highway Officials (AASHO) on November 11, 1926, State Road 8 in Washington was co-signed with US 830 from Vancouver to Maryhill and The Dalles-California Highway in Oregon was co-signed with US 97 from Shaniko Junction to the California state line. The Oregon State Highway Department created a numbered state highway system to complement the U.S. route system on May 18, 1937, and The Dalles-California Highway from Shaniko Junction to The Dalles was numbered as OR 50. OR 50 was renumbered to OR 23 on May 26, 1950, and became the Oregon section of US 197 when it was established in 1952.

US 197 traveled north onto the newly constructed The Dalles Bridge over the Columbia River to US 830 and PSH 8 northeast of Dallesport and traveled east with the two highways to end at US 97 in Maryhill. US 830 and its concurrency with US 197 were removed from the U.S. route system in 1968, leaving US 197 concurrent with the successor to PSH 8, SR 14, after the 1964 state highway renumbering. The concurrency with SR 14 was removed from the Washington state highway system in 1979, but remained as a part of US 197 as defined by the American Association of State Highway and Transportation Officials (AASHTO) until September 22, 2006.

== Major intersections ==
State	County	Location	mi (Note: Milepost numbers reset at the Oregon–Washington state line crossing.)	km	Destinations	Notes
Oregon	Wasco		0.00	0.00	US 97 – Madras, Bend, Shaniko, Biggs	Southern terminus
Oregon	Wasco		24.74	39.82	OR 216 west – Government Camp, Portland	South end of OR 216 overlap
Oregon	Wasco	Tygh Valley	33.28	53.56	OR 216 east – Tygh Valley, Wamic, Sherars Bridge, Grass Valley	North end of OR 216 overlap
Oregon	Wasco	The Dalles	66.24	106.60	US 30 west – The Dalles	South end of US 30 overlap
Oregon	Wasco	The Dalles	66.48– 66.56	106.99– 107.12	I-84 / US 30 east – The Dalles, Portland, Arlington	Interchange, north end of US 30 overlap
Columbia River			67.17 0.00	108.10 0.00	The Dalles Bridge; Oregon–Washington state line	
Washington	Klickitat		2.76	4.44	SR 14 to I-82 – Vancouver, Kennewick	Northern terminus
1.000 mi = 1.609 km; 1.000 km = 0.621 mi: Concurrency terminus
