= Prindle, Washington =

Unincorporated community in Washington, United States

- Unincorporated community
- Location within Washington (state) Location within the United States
- Coordinates: 45°35′07″N 122°09′22″W
- Country: United States
- State: Washington
- County: Skamania
- Elevation: 13 ft (4.0 m)
- Time zone: UTC-8 (Pacific (PST))
  - Summer (DST): UTC-7 (PDT)
- GNIS feature ID: 1507637

Prindle is an unincorporated community located within the Columbia River Gorge National Scenic Area along the Columbia River in Skamania County, Washington, United States. The community is located on Washington State Route 14 and lies between Washougal to the west and Skamania to the east.

== History ==
The community was named after Ernest Hinsdale Prindle, an early settler. A post office called Prindle was established in 1909, and remained in operation until 1938.

== Parks and recreation ==
The Franz Lake National Wildlife Refuge is east of the community.
