= The Dalles Bridge =

Highway bridge over the Columbia River near The Dalles, Oregon, U.S.

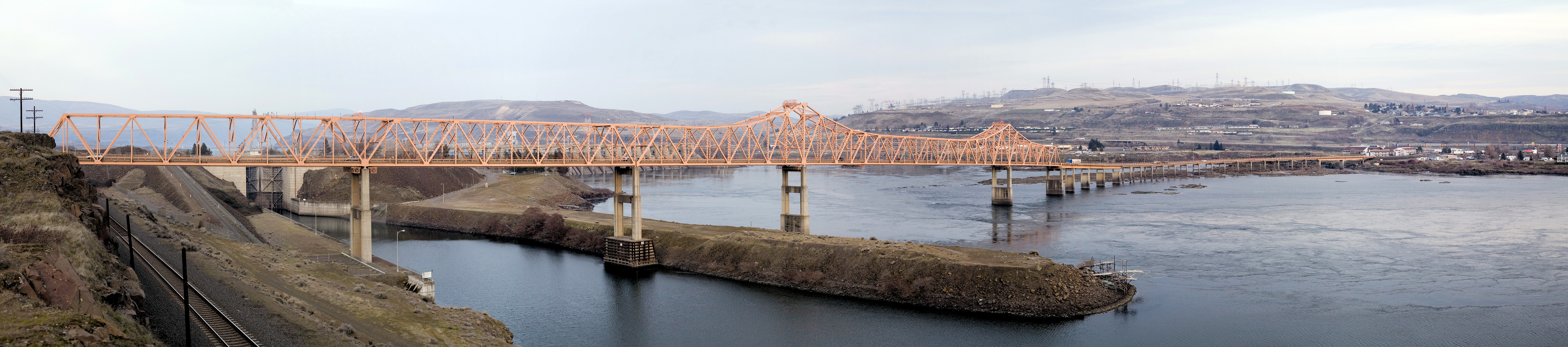
- West side of The Dalles Bridge, as viewed from the north shore of the Columbia River, January 2008
- Coordinates: 45.610136°N 121.139099°W
- Carries: US 197
- Crosses: Columbia River
- Locale: The Oregon-Washington state line (between The Dalles, Oregon and Dallesport, Washington)
- Named for: The city of The Dalles
- Maintained by: Oregon Department of Transportation
- NBI number: 06635 004 00077
- Preceded by: Oregon Trunk Rail Bridge
- Followed by: Hood River Bridge

Characteristics
- Design: Cantilever truss
- Material: Steel
- Total length: 3,339 feet (1,018 m)
- Traversable?: Yes
- Longest span: 576 feet (176 m)
- No. of spans: 33 sub-spans

History
- Construction cost: $2.4 million
- Opened: December 18, 1953
- Replaces: Ferry service

Statistics
- Daily traffic: nearly 8,400

Location
- Interactive map of The Dalles Bridge

The Dalles Bridge is a bridge on U.S. Route 197 (US 197) that spans the Columbia River in the United States between The Dalles, Oregon and Dallesport, Washington.

== Description ==
The steel cantilever truss bridge is located just downstream from The Dalles Dam. Although the bridge reaches into the state of Washington, it is maintained by the Oregon Department of Transportation. The average daily traffic on the bridge (US 197) is nearly 8,400. US 197 connects Washington State Route 14, a few miles to the north of the bridge, with Interstate 84 and US 30, both just south of the bridge, and with U.S. Route 97, about 67 miles [108 km] to the south.

== History ==
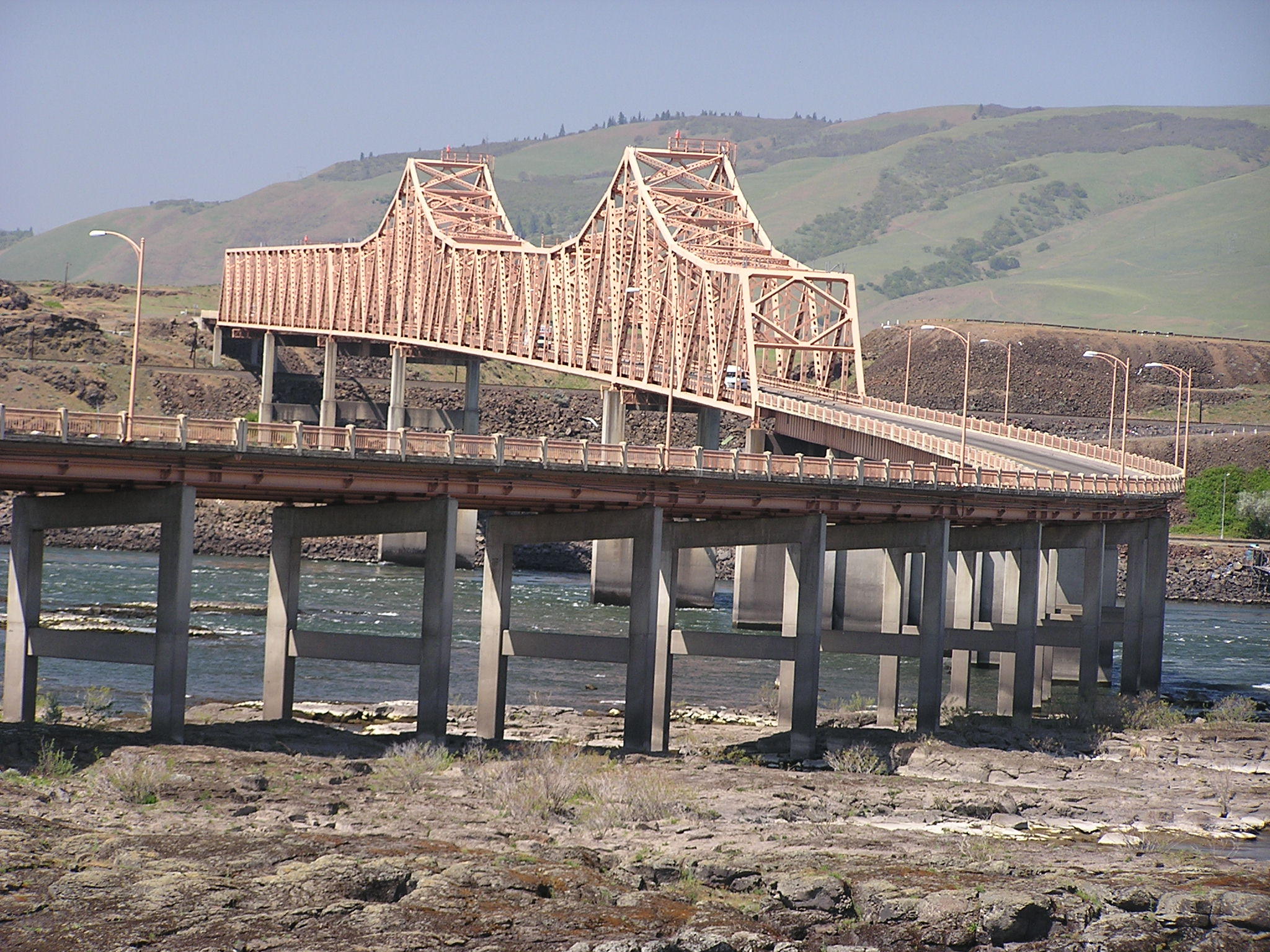
West side of The Dalles Bridge, as viewed from the southern shore of the Columbia River

Ferry service operations began at the site in 1854, but just over a decade later, in 1865, plans for a bridge began. However, it took about another 85 years and the construction of The Dalles Dam before the bridge was finally built. Although the bridge was built in connection with the dam, the bridge opened December 18, 1953, but the dam was not completed until 1957. Due to issues with the dam, the bridge had to be redesigned as a longer one and the location moved slightly farther downstream than originally planned. Notwithstanding, the already fabricated steel components (for the original bridge design) were successfully modified and used in the newly designed bridge. The cost of construction was $2.4 million (equivalent to $92.88 million in 2025).

The bridge had a toll from its opening until November 1, 1974, when the bridge's construction bond (which had been issued by Wasco County in Oregon) was paid off.
