= Skamania =

Skamania, a Chinookan word meaning swift water, may refer to:

- Skamania County, Washington, USA
- Skamania, Washington, USA
