= Oregon Route 216 =

State highway in northern Oregon, US

Oregon Route 216
- Route 216 highlighted in red

Route information
- Maintained by ODOT
- Length: 61.30 mi (98.65 km)
- Existed: 1952–present

Major junctions
- West end: US 26 in Warm Springs Junction
- US 197 near Maupin; US 197 in Tygh Valley
- East end: US 97 in Grass Valley

Location
- Country: United States
- State: Oregon
- Counties: Sherman, Wasco

Highway system
- Oregon Highways; Interstate; US; State; Named; Scenic
← OR 214	→ OR 217

Oregon Route 216 is an Oregon state highway running from U.S. Route 26 at Warm Springs Junction to U.S. Route 97 in Grass Valley. OR 216 is 61.30 miles (98.65 km) long and runs east–west.

== Route description ==
OR 216 begins at an intersection with US 26 at Warm Springs Junction on the Warm Springs Indian Reservation. It heads east along the border between the reservation and Mt. Hood National Forest, then continues through Pine Grove, and past Wapinitia to an intersection with U.S. Route 197 about two miles (3 km) west of Maupin. At this intersection, OR 216 overlaps U.S. 197 and continues north to Tygh Valley. The concurrency ends at Tygh Valley, and OR 216 continues east to Grass Valley, ending at an intersection with US 97.

=== Highways comprising ===
OR 216 comprises the following named highways (see Oregon highways and routes):

- The Wapinitia Highway No. 44;
- Part of The Dalles-California Highway No. 4; and
- The Sherars Bridge Highway No. 290.

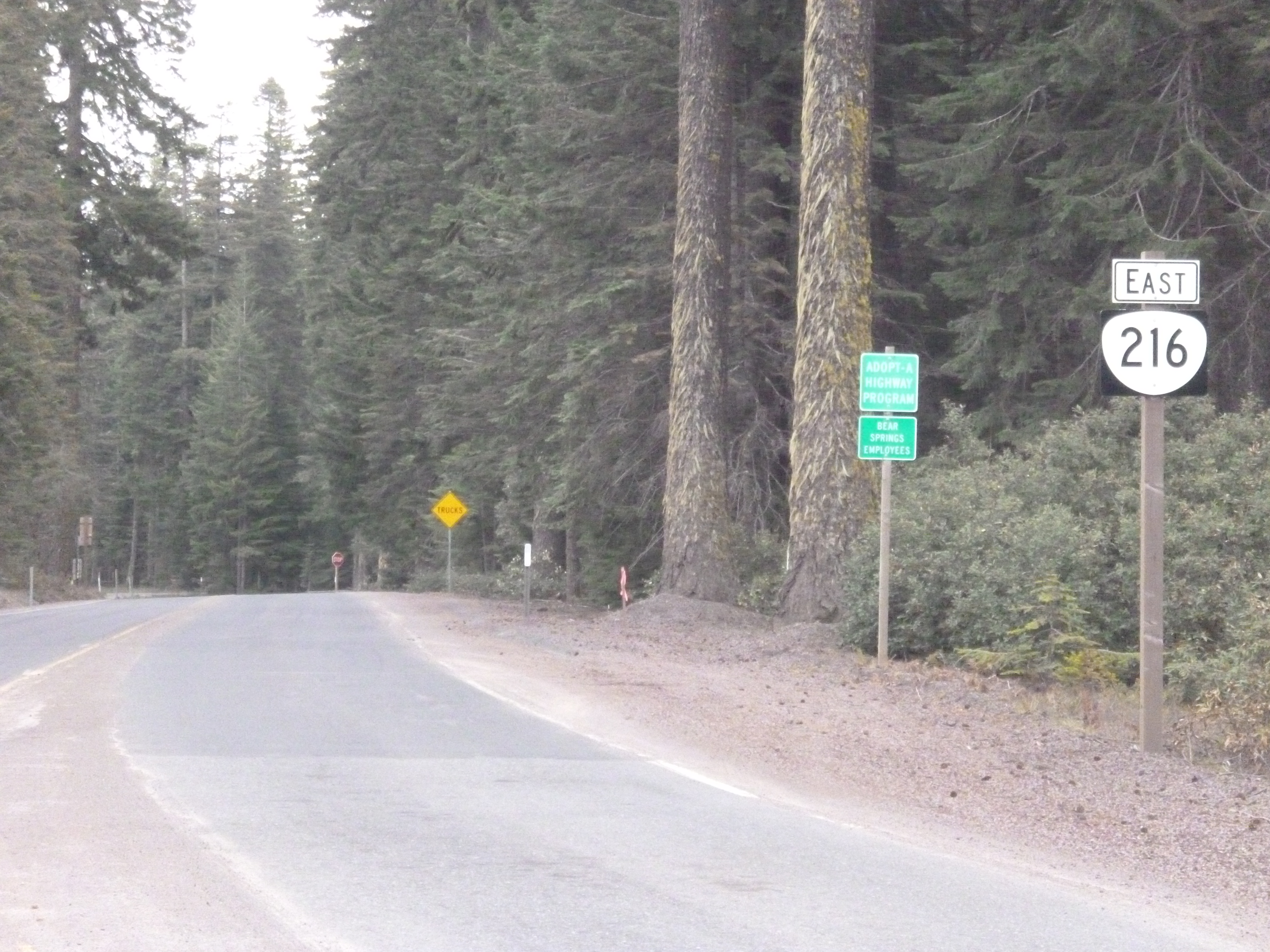
Start of Oregon Route 216

== History ==
The Wapinitia Highway was originally designated part of OR 50. In 1950, it was redesignated OR 52, as the OR 50 designation was moved to the Warm Springs Highway No. 53, and is now part of US 26. In 1952, when the former OR 90 was renumbered OR 52 to conform to its intersection with ID 52, the Wapinitia Highway was renumbered as part of OR 216.

The Sherars Bridge Highway can be traced to a bridge over the Deschutes River, built in 1860 and rebuilt in 1862. Joseph Sherar and his wife, Jane, bought the log bridge in 1871, replaced it with a wooden toll bridge, and improved 60 miles (97 km) of an existing wagon road that crossed the bridge. The bridge was purchased by Deschutes County in 1912, the modern highway built some time thereafter.

== Major intersections ==
County	Location	mi	km	Destinations	Notes
Wasco	Warm Springs Junction	0.18	0.29	US 26 – Madras	
Wasco		26.03 42.43	41.89 68.28	US 197 south – Maupin, Bend	Western end of US 197 overlap
Wasco	Tygh Valley	33.89 −0.05	54.54 −0.080	US 197 north – The Dalles	Eastern end of US 197 overlap
Sherman	Grass Valley	28.42	45.74	US 97 – Moro, Biggs, Shaniko, Madras	
1.000 mi = 1.609 km; 1.000 km = 0.621 mi: Concurrency terminus
