= Criterion, Oregon =

Unincorporated community in the state of Oregon, United States

- Unincorporated community
- Location within Oregon Location within the United States
- Coordinates: 45°02′32″N 120°59′52″W
- Country: United States
- State: Oregon
- County: Wasco
- Elevation: 3,107 ft (947 m)
- Time zone: UTC-8 (Pacific (PST))
  - Summer (DST): UTC-7 (PDT)
- Area codes: 541 and 458
- GNIS feature ID: 1119552

Criterion is an historic unincorporated community in Wasco County, in the U.S. state of Oregon. It lies along U.S. Route 197 between Maupin and Madras. Nearby is Criterion Summit, which at about 3,360 feet (1,020 m) above sea level is the highest point along the highway between The Dalles to the north and Redmond to the south. In the late 19th century, the route over the summit was a wagon road linking The Dalles to Lakeview and California.

A post office was established there in 1913. The name comes from the dictionary word meaning a "standard by which to judge quality". The founder who proposed the name linked it to the idea of a model community. Although other local residents preferred the name Three Notches, for a large, notched juniper tree growing nearby, the Post Office rejected the two-word proposal in favor of the single word, Criterion. The post office closed in 1926.

The Criterion Ranch Trail is an 11-mile (18 km) hiking route between Route 197 at Criterion and the Deschutes River to the west. It follows power lines and an old ranch trail used recently as a firebreak during a wildfire in 2011. The trail connects with other trails in the Criterion Tract, a recreational area administered by the Bureau of Land Management. It has frontage along a 5-mile (8 km) stretch of the highway and extends to the river.
