= Wapinitia, Oregon =

Unincorporated community in the state of Oregon, United States

Wapinitia
- Unincorporated community
- Location within the state of Oregon Wapinitia (the United States)
- Coordinates: 45°06′51″N 121°15′23″W
- Country: United States
- State: Oregon
- County: Wasco
- Elevation: 2,044 ft (623 m)
- Time zone: UTC−08:00 (Pacific (PST))
  - Summer (DST): UTC−07:00 (PDT)
- GNIS feature ID: 1151877

Wapinitia is an unincorporated community in Wasco County, Oregon, United States. It is near Oregon Route 216 and is approximately 40 miles (64 km) south of the county seat of The Dalles. The nearest city is Maupin, which is 9 miles (14 km) to the east.

Wapinitia is a name derived from a Native American language most likely meaning "at the edge".
