= Hood River Bridge =

Bridge between Oregon and Washington

Hood River–White Salmon Interstate Bridge
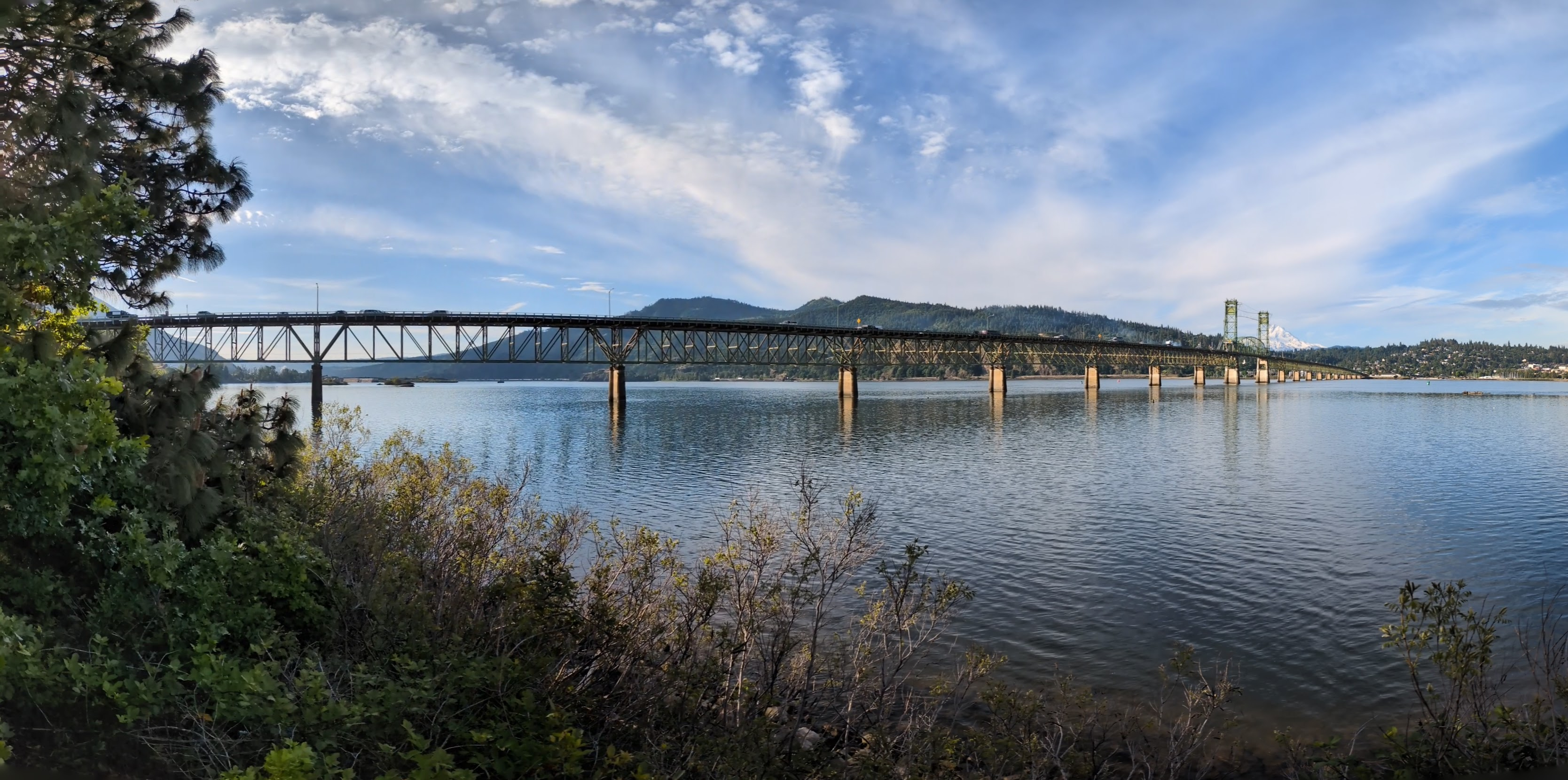
- The bridge viewed from the camping area on the Washington side
- Coordinates: 45.717976°N 121.495211°W
- Carries: 2 lanes
- Crosses: Columbia River
- Locale: Between Hood River, Oregon, and White Salmon, Washington, U.S.
- Other name: Hood River Bridge
- Maintained by: Port of Hood River

Characteristics
- Design: Deck-truss with a vertical lift
- Total length: 1,346.67 metres (4,418.2 ft)
- Longest span: 79.92 metres (262.2 ft)

History
- Opened: December 9, 1924

Statistics
- Daily traffic: 4 million (annual)
- Toll: Cars, vans, pickup without trailer: $3.50, Motorcycles: 3.00, Commercial trucks and vans: $4.00 per axle

Location
- Interactive map of Hood River–White Salmon Interstate Bridge

The Hood River–White Salmon Interstate Bridge, or just the Hood River Bridge, is a truss bridge with a vertical lift that spans the Columbia River between Hood River, Oregon, and White Salmon, Washington. It connects Interstate 84/U.S. Route 30 on the Oregon side with Washington State Route 14.

The bridge is the second oldest existing road bridge across the Columbia River between Washington and Oregon. It was built by the Oregon-Washington Bridge Company and opened on December 9, 1924. The original name was the Waucoma Interstate Bridge.

Construction of the Bonneville Dam 23 miles (37 km) downstream forced the bridge to be altered in 1938 to accommodate the resulting elevated river levels. On December 12, 1950, the Port of Hood River purchased the bridge from the Oregon-Washington Bridge Co. for $800,000.

The bridge is operated as a toll bridge by the Port of Hood River. Bicycles and pedestrians are prohibited from crossing the bridge due to its lack of sidewalks and narrow width.

Twenty piers are used to support the total length of 4,418 ft (1347 m). When closed the vertical waterway clearance is 67 ft (20m). This increases to 148 ft (45 m) when the bridge is open at a river level of 75', which typically happens once or twice a month. The horizontal waterway clearance of the lift span is 246 ft (75 m).

The bridge has weight restrictions: 24 tons for legal truck types 3 and SU5, 32 tons for types 3S2 and 3-3, 22 tons for type SU4, and 25 tons for types SU6 and SU7 (descriptions of these truck types can be found here).

It is located at river mile 169, between Bridge of the Gods at RM 148 and The Dalles Bridge at RM 191.

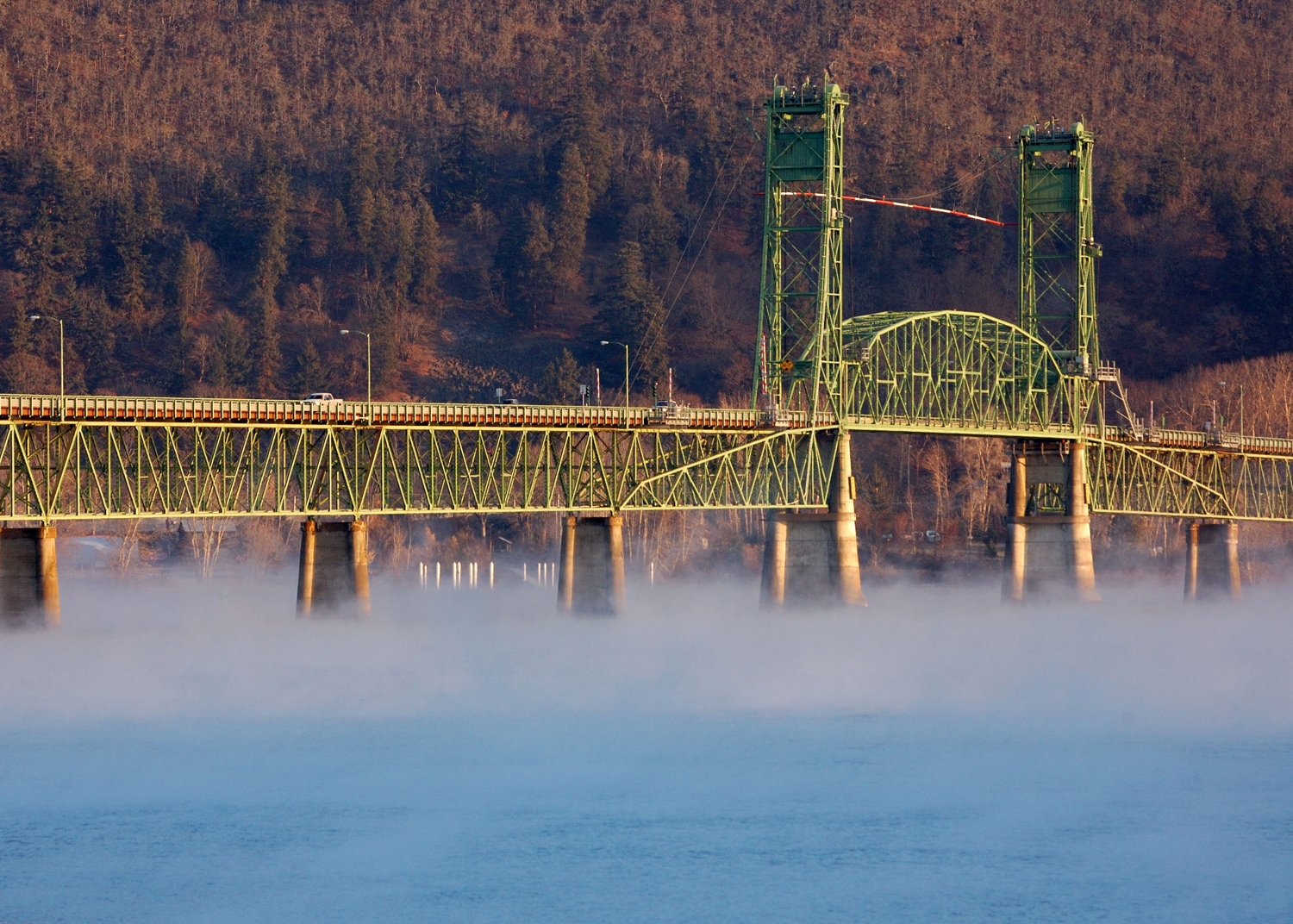
Southeast side of the bridge, showing the lift span section

== Closure ==
The Hood River Bridge was closed indefinitely to all traffic on June 27, 2024, following a semi truck's collision with the lift span that resulted in severe damage. The bridge was partially reopened to passenger vehicles on June 30, 2024, then subsequently to all vehicles weighing less than 64,000 pounds (29,000 kg) on July 20. Future bridge closures were announced for bridge inspections and lift span testing.

== Planned replacement ==
Plans to replace the existing bridge resulted in a 2003 draft environmental impact statement. A fixed span design concept with wider lanes and a bicycle/pedestrian path that meets modern seismic standards was proposed in 2022. Construction is now scheduled to begin in 2027 instead of 2025 and be completed in 2031-32 at a cost of $1.12 Billion instead of the original $520 million. Funding for the project would be split between the Oregon and Washington governments as well as federal and local sources. Higher tolls are also under consideration to pay for the replacement. A new bi-state bridge authority was formed in July 2023 to prepare for the project. In 2024, the US Department of Transportation issued a $200 million grant for the project. Oregon and Washington were expected to give $125 million each toward the project.
