= Criterion Summit =

Mountain pass in Oregon, United States

- Interactive map of Criterion Summit
- Elevation: 3,360 ft (1,020 m)
- Traversed by: US 197

Third Approach
- Location: Wasco County, Oregon, United States
- Coordinates: 44.98272°N 120.99124°W

Criterion Summit, elevation about 3,360 feet (1,020 m) above sea level, is a mountain pass in the U.S. state of Oregon that is traversed by U.S. Route 197. It lies south of Maupin, approximately 7 miles (11 km) north of the intersection of Route 197 with U.S. Route 97. A sign and viewpoint map mark the summit. The map shows peaks of the Cascade Range that are visible from this spot, from Broken Top on the southwest to Mount Adams on the northwest. The summit is near the historic unincorporated community of Criterion.
