= Pierce National Wildlife Refuge =

Wildlife refuge in Washington, United States

- IUCN category IV (habitat/species management area)
- Location within Washington (state)
- Location: Skamania County, Washington, United States
- Nearest city: North Bonneville, Washington
- Coordinates: 45°37′48″N 122°00′01″W
- Area: 329.38 acres (133.30 ha)
- Established: 1983; 43 years ago
- Governing body: U.S. Fish and Wildlife Service
- Website: Pierce National Wildlife Refuge

The Pierce National Wildlife Refuge is in southwest Washington within the Columbia River Gorge National Scenic Area. It encompasses wetlands and uplands along the north shore of the Columbia River west of the town of North Bonneville. Refuge habitats include wetlands, Columbia River riparian corridor blocks, transitional woodlands from willows to cottonwood/ash to white oak to Douglas fir, improved pastures with some native grasses, and numerous creeks, seeps, and springs.

Hardy Creek, which bisects the refuge from east to west, supports one of the last remaining runs of chum salmon on the Columbia River. The creek also supports small remnant runs of coho salmon, steelhead, and Chinook salmon as well as a variety of native species of freshwater fish. The refuge headquarters also serves as the main office for Steigerwald Lake and Franz Lake National Wildlife Refuges. Visitor opportunities are limited to arranged group tours and viewing from the summit of Beacon Rock and the Hamilton Mountain Trail (both located in Beacon Rock State Park).
