= Tygh Valley, Oregon =

Unincorporated community in the state of Oregon, United States

- Census-designated place (CDP)
- Location of Tygh Valley, Oregon
- Coordinates: 45°14′48″N 121°10′09″W
- Country: United States
- State: Oregon
- County: Wasco

Area
  - Total: 3.73 sq mi (9.66 km^{2})
  - Land: 3.73 sq mi (9.66 km^{2})
  - Water: 0 sq mi (0.00 km^{2})
- Elevation: 1,194 ft (364 m)

Population (2020)
  - Total: 236
  - Density: 63.2/sq mi (24.42/km^{2})
- Time zone: UTC-8 (Pacific (PST))
  - Summer (DST): UTC-7 (PDT)
- ZIP code: 97063
- Area codes: 458 and 541
- FIPS code: 41-75500
- GNIS feature ID: 2409376

Tygh Valley is a census-designated place (CDP) and unincorporated community in Wasco County, Oregon, United States. As of the 2020 census, Tygh Valley had a population of 236.

== History ==
Named for the Tygh (Taih, Tyigh) or "Upper Deschutes" Tenino people, Tygh Valley is considered by some to be the beginning of the Barlow Road because many wagon trains crossed the Deschutes River at Sherars Bridge and proceeded west bypassing The Dalles. However, the National Park Service treats the first tollgate site at Gate Creek on the White River as the beginning of the Barlow Road.

== Geography ==
According to the United States Census Bureau, the CDP has a total area of 3.8 square miles (9.8 km^{2}), all of it land.

=== Climate ===
Climate data for Tygh Valley, Oregon
| Month | Jan | Feb | Mar | Apr | May | Jun | Jul | Aug | Sep | Oct | Nov | Dec | Year |
|---|---|---|---|---|---|---|---|---|---|---|---|---|---|
| Record high °F (°C) | 70 (21) | 73 (23) | 80 (27) | 90 (32) | 103 (39) | 116 (47) | 110 (43) | 109 (43) | 103 (39) | 92 (33) | 75 (24) | 67 (19) | 116 (47) |
| Mean daily maximum °F (°C) | 41 (5) | 47 (8) | 56 (13) | 63 (17) | 71 (22) | 78 (26) | 86 (30) | 86 (30) | 78 (26) | 65 (18) | 49 (9) | 40 (4) | 63 (17) |
| Mean daily minimum °F (°C) | 26 (−3) | 29 (−2) | 32 (0) | 36 (2) | 40 (4) | 45 (7) | 50 (10) | 50 (10) | 45 (7) | 37 (3) | 32 (0) | 27 (−3) | 37 (3) |
| Record low °F (°C) | −26 (−32) | −28 (−33) | 5 (−15) | 17 (−8) | 21 (−6) | 26 (−3) | 33 (1) | 32 (0) | 24 (−4) | 8 (−13) | −12 (−24) | −19 (−28) | −28 (−33) |
| Average precipitation inches (cm) | 2.1 (5.3) | 1.5 (3.8) | 1.3 (3.2) | 1.0 (2.4) | 0.8 (2.1) | 0.6 (1.5) | 0.3 (0.8) | 0.5 (1.1) | 0.5 (1.4) | 0.9 (2.3) | 1.8 (4.7) | 2.0 (5.2) | 13.4 (34.0) |
Source: weather.com

- Annual Average High Temperatures: 86 °F (summer) 41 °F (winter)
- Annual Average Low Temperatures 50 °F (summer) 26 °F (winter)
- Highest Recorded Temperature: 116 °F (June 2021)
- Lowest Recorded Temperature: -28 °F (1950)
- Warmest Month: July
- Coolest Month: January
- Highest Precipitation: January
- Annual Precipitation: 13.37 inches

== Demographics ==
Historical population
| Census | Pop. | Note | %± |
|---|---|---|---|
| 2020 | 236 | | — |
U.S. Decennial Census

As of the census of 2000, there were 224 people, 97 households, and 67 families residing in the CDP. The population density was 59.4 inhabitants per square mile (22.9/km^{2}). There were 109 housing units at an average density of 28.9 per square mile (11.2/km^{2}). The racial makeup of the CDP was 95.09% White, 1.34% Native American, 2.23% Asian, and 1.34% from two or more races.

There were 97 households, out of which 22.7% had children under the age of 18 living with them, 54.6% were married couples living together, 10.3% had a female householder with no husband present, and 29.9% were non-families. 27.8% of all households were made up of individuals, and 13.4% had someone living alone who was 65 years of age or older. The average household size was 2.31 and the average family size was 2.79.

In the CDP, the population was spread out, with 21.4% under the age of 18, 4.0% from 18 to 24, 20.5% from 25 to 44, 31.3% from 45 to 64, and 22.8% who were 65 years of age or older. The median age was 47 years. For every 100 females, there were 107.4 males. For every 100 females age 18 and over, there were 102.3 males.

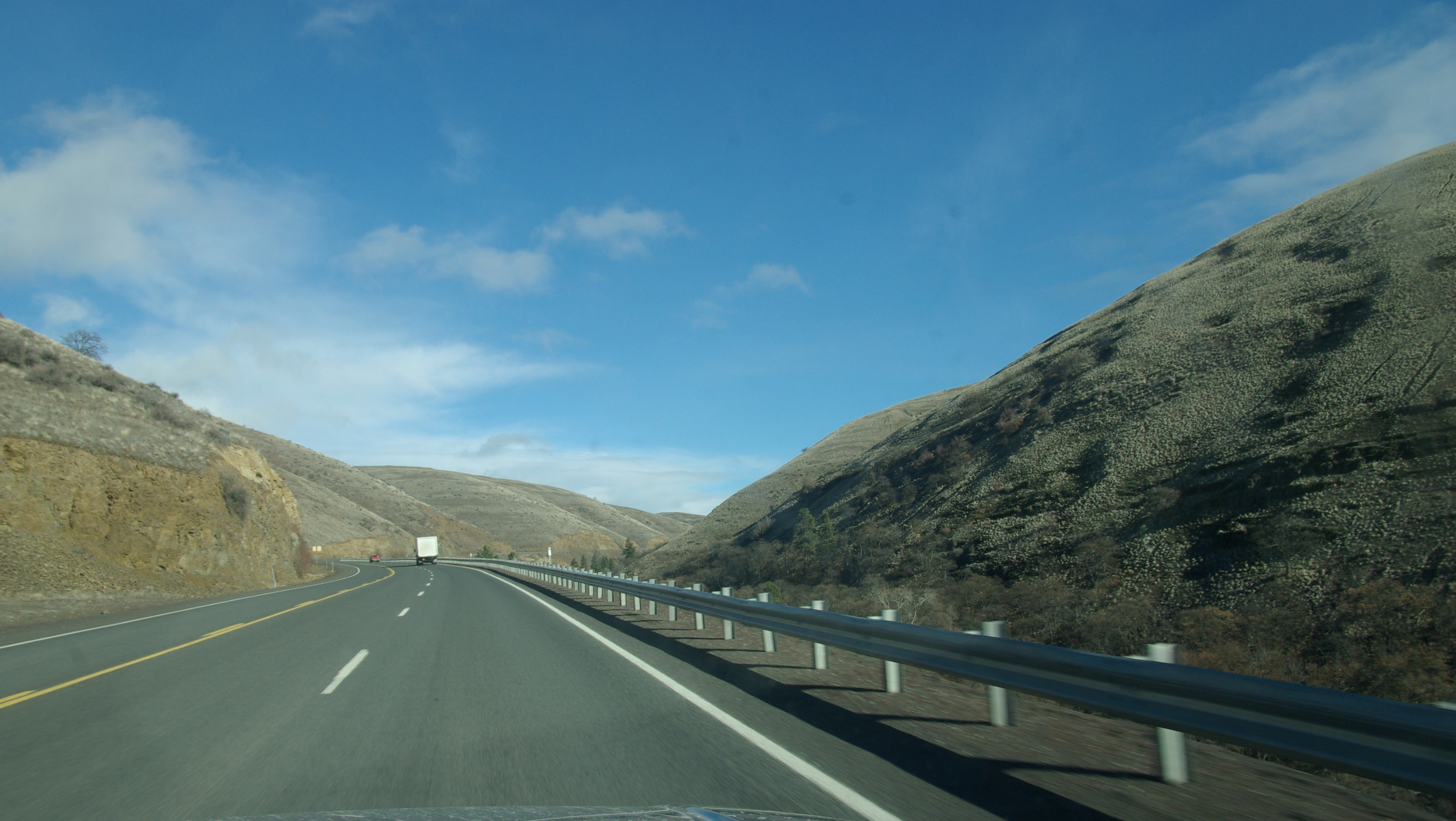
US 197 North out of Tygh Valley heads up a gulch

The median income for a household in the CDP was $24,167, and the median income for a family was $24,688. Males had a median income of $29,375 versus $11,750 for females. The per capita income for the CDP was $14,255. About 23.5% of families and 22.1% of the population were below the poverty line, including 50.0% of those under the age of eighteen and 4.5% of those 65 or over.

== Transportation ==
- U.S. Route 197 (Generally a north–south route)
- Oregon Route 216 (Generally an east–west route)
