= Washington State Route 501 =

State highway in Washington, United States

State Route 501
- Erwin O. Rieger Memorial Highway
- The existing highway is highlighted in red. The proposed completion is shown in dashed purple.

Route information
- Auxiliary route of I-5
- Maintained by WSDOT
- Length: 13.97 mi (22.48 km)
- Existed: 1964–present

Southern section
- Length: 11.00 mi (17.70 km)
- South end: I-5 in Vancouver
- North end: Ridgefield NWR near Vancouver

Northern section
- Length: 2.97 mi (4.78 km)
- West end: Main Street in Ridgefield
- East end: I-5 in Ridgefield

Location
- Country: United States
- State: Washington
- Counties: Clark

Highway system
- State highways in Washington; Interstate; US; State; Scenic; Pre-1964; 1964 renumbering; Former
← SR 500	→ SR 502

State Route 501 (SR 501, designated as the Erwin O. Rieger Memorial Highway) is a 13.97-mile-long (22.48 km) state highway in the southern part of the U.S. state of Washington. It is split into two sections in Clark County, a north–south alignment connecting Interstate 5 (I-5) in Vancouver to the Port of Vancouver and the Ridgefield National Wildlife Refuge, and a west–east alignment connecting Ridgefield to I-5. Prior to the 1964 highway renumbering, SR 501 was designated as Secondary State Highway 1T (SSH 1T), established in 1937 and re-aligned to serve the Port of Vancouver in 1963.

== Route description ==
=== Southern section ===
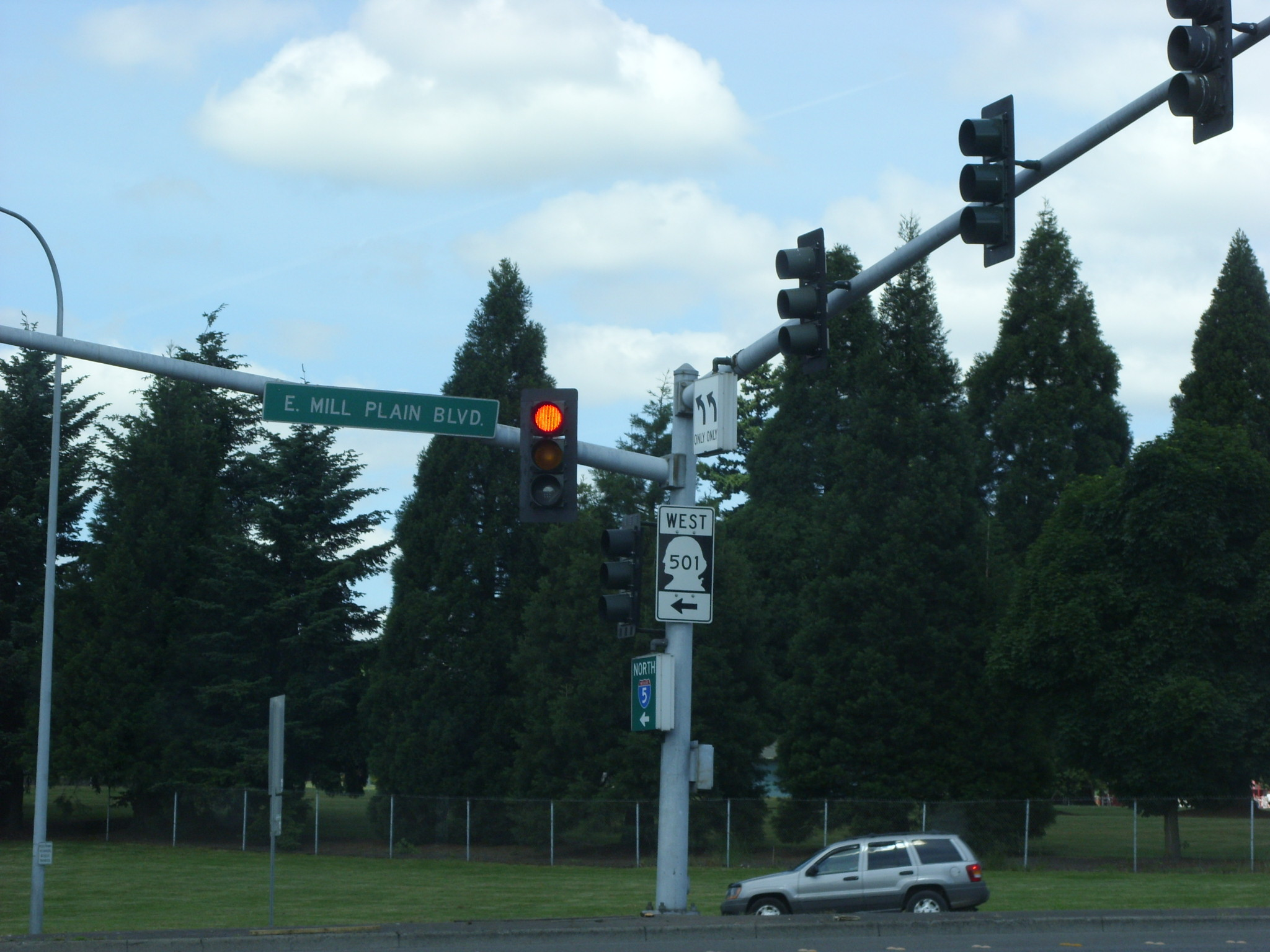
The southern terminus of SR 501 at an interchange with I-5 near Downtown Vancouver

The 11.00-mile-long (17.70 km) southern section of SR 501 and the Erwin O. Rieger Memorial Highway begins as the four-lane Mill Plain Boulevard at a diamond interchange with I-5 in Downtown Vancouver. The highway travels west through Downtown Vancouver and splits into a one-way pair on Mill Plain Boulevard and 15th Street before rejoining as Mill Plain Boulevard. SR 501 crosses a BNSF rail yard and enters the Port of Vancouver, becoming the Lower River Road and narrowing to a two-lane highway on the south side of Vancouver Lake. The highway follows the Columbia and Lake rivers north past the Shillapoo Wildlife Recreation Area, ending south of Post Office Lake in the Ridgefield National Wildlife Refuge.

Every year, the Washington State Department of Transportation (WSDOT) conducts a series of surveys on its highways in the state to measure traffic volume. This is expressed in terms of annual average daily traffic (AADT), which is a measure of traffic volume for any average day of the year. In 2011, WSDOT calculated that the busiest section of SR 501 overall was west of I-5 at C Street, serving 13,000 vehicles, while the least busiest section of SR 501 overall was south of Shillapoo Wildlife Recreation Area, serving 650 vehicles. Between I-5 and the Port of Vancouver, SR 501 is designated as part of WSDOT's Highway of Statewide Significance, which include interstate highways and other principal arterials that are needed to connect major communities in the state of Washington.

=== Northern section ===
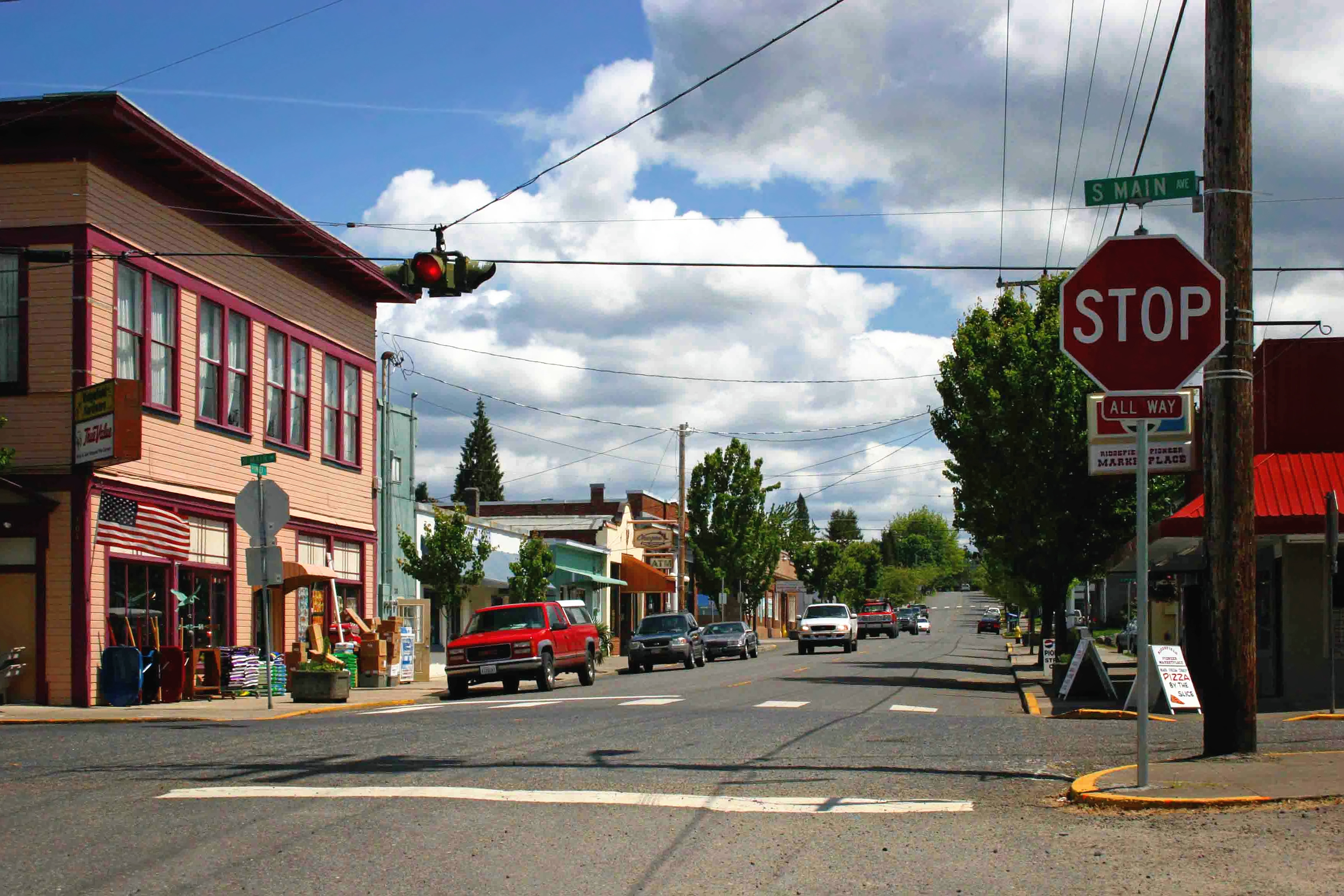
Looking east at the intersections of Main Avenue and Pioneer Street (SR 501) in Downtown Ridgefield

The 2.97-mile-long (4.78 km) northern section of SR 501 within Ridgefield begins as Pioneer Street at an intersection with Main Avenue at the Ridgefield City Hall. The highway travels east through Downtown Ridgefield, passing View Ridge Middle School, before crossing over Gee Creek. SR 501 continues east through two roundabouts, at 45th Avenue and 56th Place, before ending at a diamond interchange with I-5.

Every year, WSDOT conducts a series of surveys on its highways in the state to measure traffic volume. This is expressed in terms of AADT, which is a measure of traffic volume for any average day of the year. In 2011, WSDOT calculated that the busiest section of the northern section was the I-5 interchange, serving 11,000 vehicles, while the least busiest section was the intersection with Main Street in Downtown Ridgefield, serving 3,200 vehicles.

As of July 6, 2024, the Northern Section between the western Ridgefield City Limits and the eastern terminus at Interstate 5 was transferred to the City of Ridgefield through the Route Jurisdiction Transfer process, enacted by House Bill 2318, unanimously approved by the 68th Legislature 2024 Regular Session, and signed into law by Governor Jay Inslee on March 13, 2024. (https://lawfilesext.leg.wa.gov/biennium/2023-24/Pdf/Bills/Session%20Laws/House/2318.SL.pdf?q=20241215075257) (https://ridgefieldwa.portal.civicclerk.com/event/645/files/attachment/798).

== History ==
SSH 1T was created in 1937 during the formation of the primary and secondary state highways, traveling on a 18.86-mile-long (30.35 km) route north from Primary State Highway 1 (PSH 1) and U.S. Route 99 (US 99) in Vancouver through Felida and Ridgefield to PSH 1 and US 99 at Pioneer. The highway was extended into Vancouver in the 1950s and re-aligned in 1963 to serve the Port of Vancouver, traveling along the Columbia River to Ridgefield west of Vancouver Lake onto a roadway that was to be constructed. The state highway commission realigned the highway onto a pair of one-way streets within Vancouver in late 1968. The first section of the Columbia River segment was completed in 1969, but the remainder never left the design phase. SSH 1T became SR 501 during the 1964 highway renumbering and codified as such in 1970, being designated as the Erwin O. Rieger Memorial Highway in 1991. In the late 1990s, Mill Plain Boulevard was extended west from downtown Vancouver to the industrial area west of the railyard to serve the Port of Vancouver. The $35 million project was dedicated on September 30, 2000, and incorporated into SR 501.

The section of the highway between the Ridgefield National Wildlife Refuge and the city of Ridgefield has never been constructed and remains as a physical gap in the state highway system. The interchange between I-5 and SR 501 east of Ridgefield was rebuilt by WSDOT between 2010 and 2012, adding roundabouts at intersections west and east of the interchange as well. On July 14, 2015, WSDOT permanently closed the northern 1 1/3-mile-long (2.1 km) of SR 501's southern section due to the Columbia River reclaiming the highway. That part of the highway was relinquished to Clark County in 2016. Eventually, that section was vacated to surrounding property owners.

== Major intersections ==
The entire highway is in Clark County.

Location	mi	km	Destinations	Notes
Vancouver	0.00– 0.05	0.00– 0.080	I-5 – Portland, Seattle	I-5 exit 1C; interchange.
	11.00	17.70	Ridgefield National Wildlife Refuge	
Gap in route
Ridgefield	11.00	17.70	Main Avenue	
Ridgefield	13.88– 13.97	22.34– 22.48	I-5 – Portland, Seattle	I-5 exit 14; interchange.
1.000 mi = 1.609 km; 1.000 km = 0.621 mi
