= Steigerwald Lake National Wildlife Refuge =

Protected area in Washington state, US

- IUCN category IV (habitat/species management area)
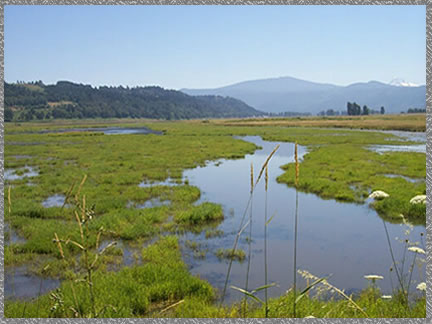

- Location within Washington (state)
- Location: Clark County, Washington, United States
- Nearest city: Washougal, Washington
- Coordinates: 45°34′02″N 122°18′14″W
- Area: 1,049 acres (4.25 km^{2}; 425 ha)
- Established: 1987
- Governing body: U.S. Fish and Wildlife Service
- Website: Official website

The Steigerwald Lake National Wildlife Refuge is a 1,049-acre (4.25 km^{2}; 425 ha) riverine flood plain habitat, semi-permanent wetland on the Columbia River, 10 miles (16 km) east of Vancouver, Washington, with cottonwood-dominated riparian corridors, pastures, and remnant stands of Oregon white oak. The largest wetland restoration project on the lower Columbia River involves removing about 2 miles (3.2 km) of levees separating the refuge from the river to restore 965 acres (391 ha) of floodplain habitat.

The refuge lies partly within the Columbia River Gorge National Scenic Area and serves as the operational headquarters for the 329-acre (1.33 km^{2}) Pierce National Wildlife Refuge. It has been designated as the site of the "Gateway to the Gorge" visitor center. This facility was completed in late 2022. The Washington Department of Transportation has estimated that this facility may be used by as many as 100,000 visitors annually, providing the it with one of the best outreach opportunities in the Pacific Northwest.
