= Washington State Route 14 =

East-west state highway in Washington, US

State Route 14
- Lewis and Clark Highway
- SR 14 highlighted in red

Route information
- Maintained by WSDOT
- Length: 180.66 mi (290.74 km)
- Existed: 1968–present
- Tourist routes: Lewis and Clark Trail; Columbia River Gorge Scenic Byway

Major junctions
- West end: I-5 in Vancouver
- I-205 in Vancouver; SR 500 in Camas; US 197 near Dallesport; US 97 in Maryhill
- East end: I-82 / US 395 near Plymouth

Location
- Country: United States
- State: Washington
- Counties: Clark, Skamania, Klickitat, Benton

Highway system
- State highways in Washington; Interstate; US; State; Scenic; Pre-1964; 1964 renumbering; Former
← US 12	→ SR 16

State Route 14 (SR 14) is a 180.66-mile-long (290.74 km) state highway in the U.S. state of Washington. The highway travels east-west on the north side of the Columbia River, opposite Interstate 84 (I-84) to the south in Oregon. SR 14 forms a section of the Lewis and Clark Trail Scenic Byway and begins at an interchange with I-5 in Vancouver. The highway travels east as a four-lane freeway through Camas and Washougal and intersects I-205. SR 14 continues east as a two-lane highway through Clark, Skamania, Klickitat, and Benton counties before it ends at an interchange with I-82 and U.S. Route 395 (US 395) near Plymouth.

SR 14 was established in 1968 as the successor to US 830, created in 1926 with the original United States Numbered Highways, and Primary State Highway 8 (PSH 8). PSH 8 was added to the state highway system in 1905 as a short road along the Columbia River between Washougal and Lyle and was extended westwards to Vancouver and eastwards to Maryhill by 1913. PSH 8, designated as the Evergreen Highway, was extended east to the Tri-Cities in 1949 and this section was retained during the 1964 state highway renumbering and the decommissioning of US 830.

== Route description ==
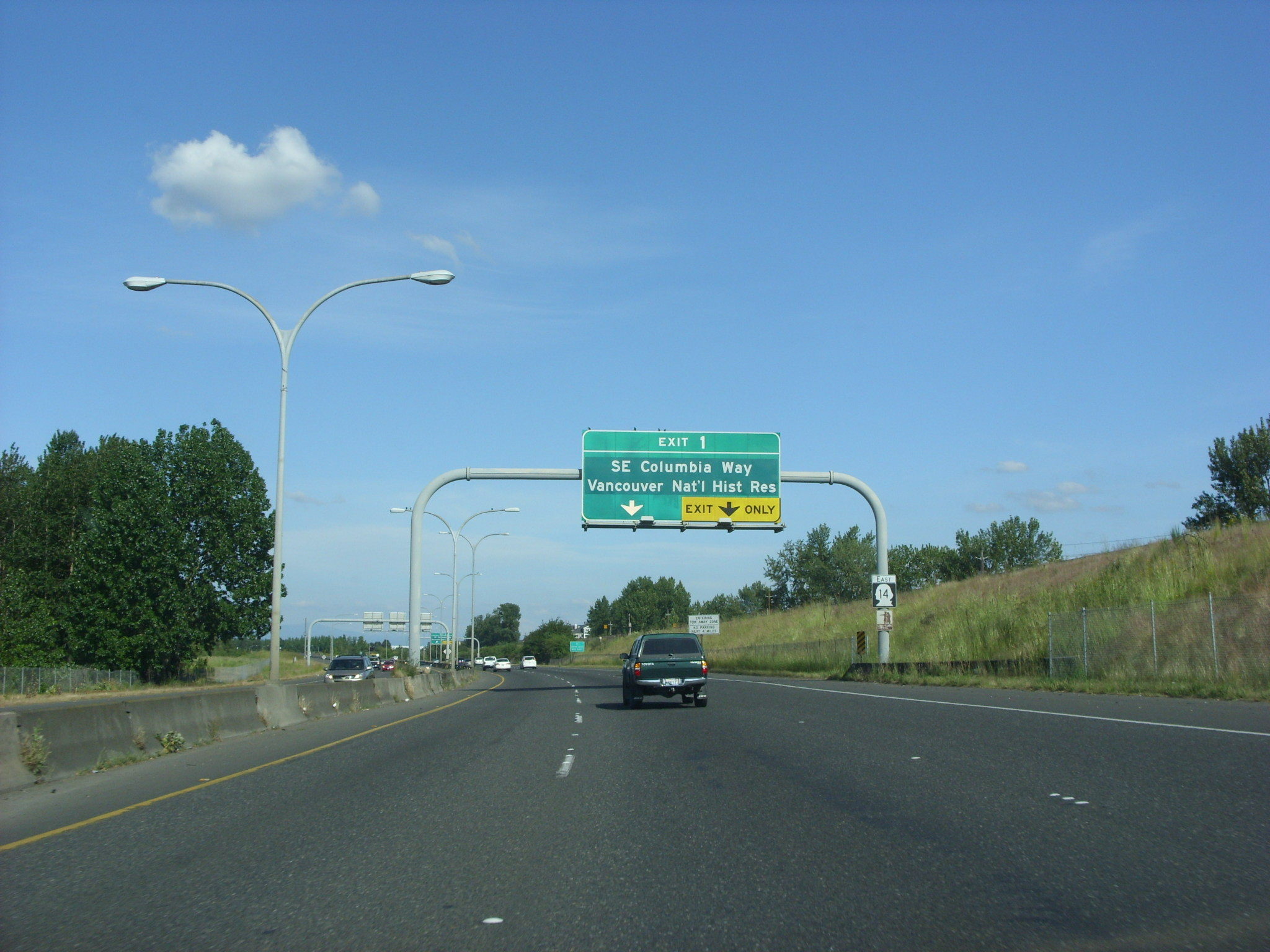
SR 14 eastbound in Vancouver

SR 14 begins as a continuation of the Lewis and Clark Trail Scenic Byway in downtown Vancouver at a partial cloverleaf interchange with I-5, Washington Street, and C Street, located on the first exit on I-5 north of the Interstate Bridge, which provides access to Portland, Oregon. The four-lane freeway travels eastward, between the Columbia River and the Seattle Subdivision of the BNSF Northern Transcon route to the south and Pearson Field to the north, and intersects Southeast Columbia Way in a single-point urban interchange, providing access to the Vancouver National Historic Reserve Historic District. SR 14 continues southeast through suburban Vancouver, intersecting Riverside Drive in a partial cloverleaf interchange, Lieser Road in a diamond interchange, and Ellsworth Avenue in a partial diamond interchange, before reaching a partial cloverleaf interchange with I-205 north of the Glenn L. Jackson Memorial Bridge, providing access to eastern suburbs of Portland.

SR 14 travels east through an interchange with Southeast 164th Avenue before leaving Vancouver, heading towards Camas. The freeway intersects Southeast 192nd Avenue in unincorporated Clark County before entering the city of Camas at an interchange with its business route on 6th Avenue. SR 14 narrows to two lanes on a bridge crossing the Camas Slough to Lady Island and enters downtown Camas after leaving the island. The highway serves as a four-lane freeway bypass of Camas and travels through two partial double roundabout interchanges with SR 500, which travels northwestward to Orchards, and 2nd Street in Washougal. SR 14 continues east past the Steigerwald Lake, Franz Lake, and Pierce national wildlife refuges, all located within Columbia River Gorge National Scenic Area in Clark and Skamania counties. The highway also passes the Bonneville Dam in North Bonneville and the Bridge of the Gods before reaching Stevenson, the county seat of Skamania County. SR 14 leaves Stevenson traveling eastwards through the community of Carson River Valley and a series of tunnels along the Columbia River before crossing over the White Salmon River into Klickitat County near Underwood.

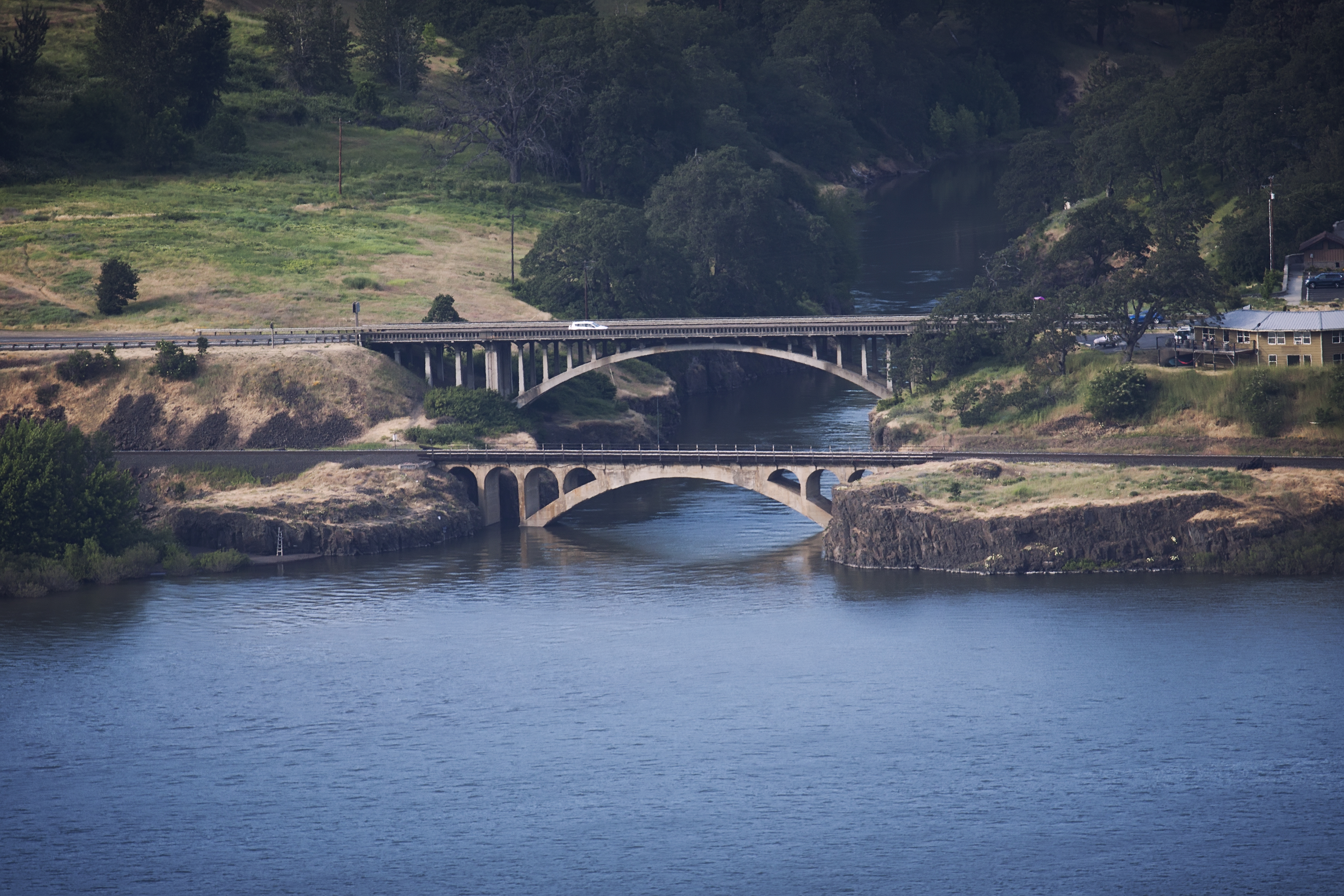
The high bridge here carries SR 14 across the Klickitat River at Lyle, Washington.

The highway intersects SR 141 Alternate and the Hood River Bridge, before reaching the cities of White Salmon and Bingen, where it passes the local Amtrak station and travels through a junction with SR 141. SR 14 continues east and crosses the Klickitat River into Lyle and forms the southern terminus of SR 142, which travels northeast towards Goldendale. The highway travels east to a junction with US 197 near Dallesport and to Wishram, passing its Amtrak station. SR 14 leaves the Columbia River Gorge National Scenic Area west of Maryhill, where the highway intersects its spur route and US 97, forming a short concurrency with the latter. SR 14 continues northeast along the Columbia Hills and the Columbia River into Benton County, reaching a junction with SR 221 in Paterson. The highway ends at a diamond interchange with I-82 and US 395 northeast of Plymouth, located north of the Umatilla Bridge.

Every year, the Washington State Department of Transportation (WSDOT) conducts a series of surveys on its highways in the state to measure traffic volume. This is expressed in terms of annual average daily traffic (AADT), which is a measure of traffic volume for any average day of the year. In 2012, WSDOT calculated that the busiest section of SR 14 was east of its interchange with I-205 in Vancouver, serving 72,000 vehicles, while the least busiest section of the highway was in Maryhill, serving 500 vehicles. SR 14 between Vancouver and Maryhill is designated as part of the National Highway System for its whole length, classifying it as important to the national economy, defense, and mobility. WSDOT designates the same corridor as a Highway of Statewide Significance, which includes highways that connect major communities in the state of Washington.

== History ==
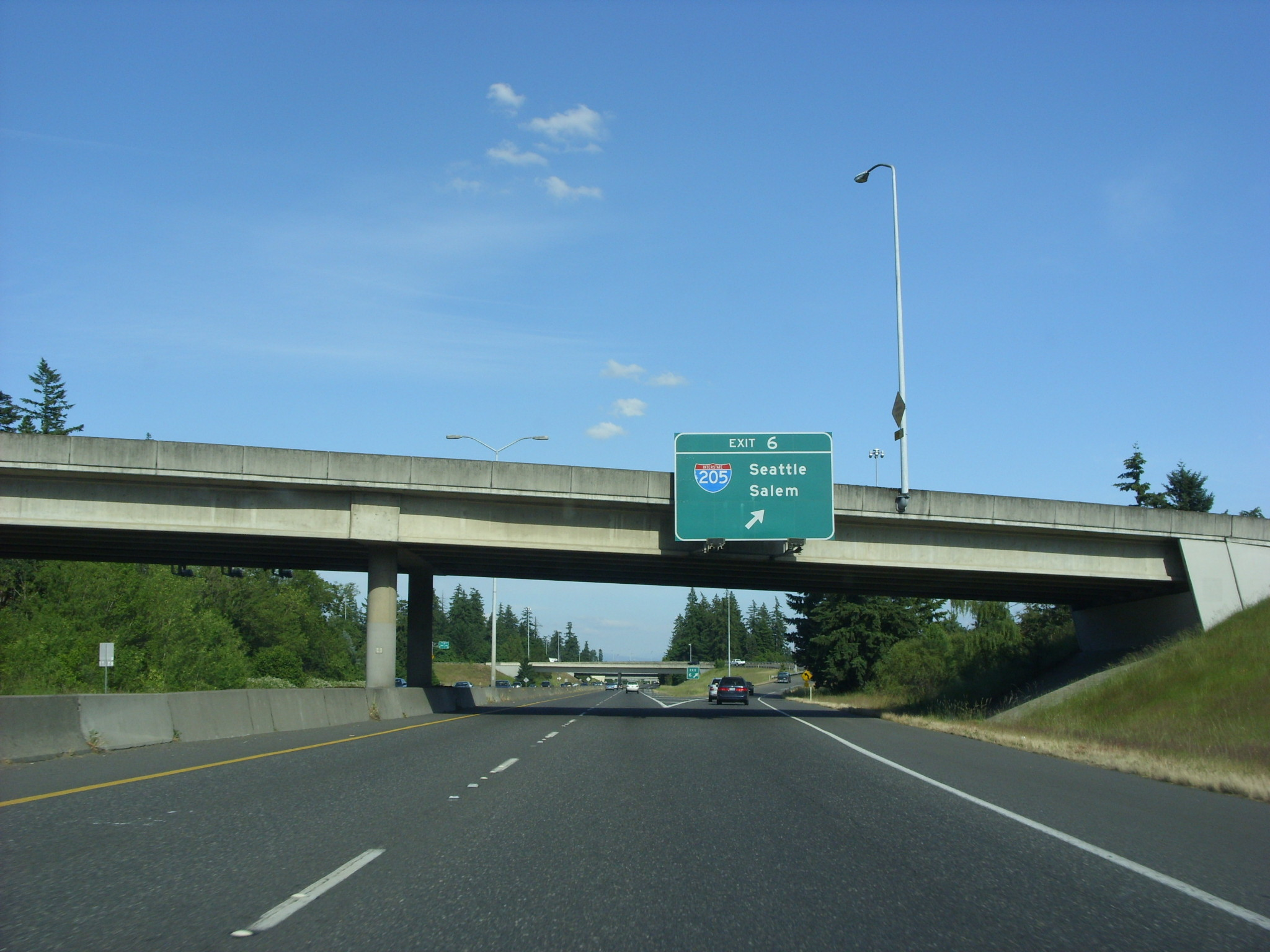
SR 14 at its interchange with I-205, built in the 1970s

The first highway that traveled through the Columbia River Gorge was surveyed in 1905 at a cost of $15,000 (equivalent to $537,500 in 2025) by the state of Washington as a wagon road connecting Washougal in Clark County to Lyle in Klickitat County that was designated as secondary State Road 8. State Road 8 was extended east from Lyle to Maryhill and northeast to the county seat of Goldendale in 1907. The secondary highway, named the North Bank Highway, was re-aligned in 1913 to follow closer to the Columbia River and was extended west to Vancouver and east to Mabton via Satus Pass. State Road 8 was co-signed with US 830 after the United States Numbered Highways were approved by the American Association of State Highway Officials (AASHO) on November 11, 1926, also creating a short concurrency with US 97.

The North Bank Highway was constructed with macadam pavement and was dedicated from Lyle to Dallesport in 1934, shortly before State Road 8 was re-designated as PSH 8 and the Evergreen Highway in 1937, traveling east from Vancouver to Mayhill and north to Yakima. SSH 8E, a branch of PSH 8, was also established in 1937 and ran east from PSH 8 in Maryhill to Paterson and north to PSH 3 in Prosser. SSH 8E was replaced by the Maryhill–Kennewick branch of PSH 8 in 1943, amidst proposals to extend the Evergreen Highway to the Tri-Cities in 1949. US 197, a spur of US 97, was created in 1952 and became concurrent with US 830 and PSH 8 from the Dallesport area to a junction with its parent route in Maryhill. A section of the winding PSH 8 between Maryhill and Roosevelt was replaced with a new highway running along the north bank of the river in June 1964.

PSH 8 was replaced fully by US 830 during the 1964 state highway renumbering, but US 830 was decommissioned in 1968 before the new state routes were codified. SR 14, previously on the route of US 12, was established in 1967 and remains the designation for the Evergreen Highway. The concurrency with US 197 was removed by WSDOT in 1980, but was not recognized by the American Association of State Highway and Transportation Officials until their general meeting in September 2006. The eastern terminus of SR 14 was moved south from Kennewick in 1985 to an interchange with I-82 that was completed in 1981.

The western terminus at I-5 in Vancouver was rebuilt in 1984 with more ramps to allow for fully-directional navigation, at the cost of land from Fort Vancouver Park. Several new interchanges were built in the late 1980s in eastern Vancouver to bring SR 14 to full grade separation.

The Vancouver Land Bridge, a pedestrian bridge over SR 14 with earthen approaches, was completed in 2008 near Fort Vancouver. It was built as part of the Confluence Project, following the route of an ancient Native American trail while also providing access to the Columbia River waterfront from Fort Vancouver.

== Spur route ==
State Route 14 Spur
- Location: Maryhill, Washington
- Length: 0.39 mi (630 m)
- Existed: 1991–present

SR 14 has a 0.39-mile-long (0.63 km) spur route in Maryhill that connects the eastbound lane of the main highway to US 97 northbound. The spur route was established in 1991 during a re-alignment of the two highways in Maryhill and, during its annual AADT survey, WSDOT calculated that 1,400 vehicles used the highway in 2012.

== Major intersections ==
County	Location	mi	km	Exit	Destinations	Notes
Clark	Vancouver	0.00	0.00		I-5 / Lewis and Clark Trail – Portland, Seattle, City Center	Continues as Washington and C streets
Clark	Vancouver	1.07	1.72	1	Southeast Columbia Way – Fort Vancouver National Historic Site	
Clark	Vancouver	2.24	3.60	—	Southeast Marine Park Way	Eastbound entrance only
Clark	Vancouver	3.00	4.83	3	Evergreen Boulevard, Riverside Drive	
Clark	Vancouver	4.36	7.02	4	Lieser Road, Southeast 88th Avenue	
Clark	Vancouver	5.58	8.98	5	Southeast Ellsworth Road	Eastbound exit and westbound entrance
Clark	Vancouver	6.09	9.80	6	I-205 – Seattle, Salem	
Clark	Vancouver	8.55	13.76	8	Southeast 164th Avenue	
Clark	Vancouver	9.47	15.24	10	Southeast 192nd Avenue	
Clark	Camas	12.41	19.97	12	Northwest 6th Avenue – Camas City Center	
Clark	Camas	Gap in freeway				
Clark	Camas	14.64	23.56	14	SR 500 west (Union Street)	Eastbound exit and westbound entrance
Clark	Washougal	15.02	24.17	14	2nd Street	Eastbound entrance and westbound exit
Clark	Washougal	East end of freeway				
Clark	Washougal	16.11	25.93		15th Street – Washougal	Former SR 140 east
Clark		18.90	30.42		Evergreen Boulevard – Washougal	
Skamania		26.11	42.02		Salmon Falls Road	Former SR 140 west
Skamania		41.46	66.72		Bridge of the Gods Road – Cascade Locks	
Klickitat		63.43	102.08		SR 141 Alt. – Trout Lake	
Klickitat	White Salmon	64.97	104.56		Hood River Bridge Road	Unsigned SR 35 south
Klickitat	Bingen	66.30	106.70		SR 141 north (Oak Street) – White Salmon, Trout Lake	
Klickitat	Lyle	75.76	121.92		SR 142 east – Klickitat, Wahkiacus	
Klickitat		83.42	134.25		US 197 south – The Dalles	
Klickitat	Maryhill	100.55	161.82		SR 14 Spur east to US 97 north	
Klickitat	Maryhill	100.91	162.40		US 97 north – Goldendale, Yakima	West end of US 97 overlap
Klickitat	Maryhill	101.33	163.07		US 97 south to I-84 – Bend	East end of US 97 overlap
Benton	Paterson	167.14	268.99		SR 221 north – Prosser	
Benton		179.85	289.44		Plymouth Road – Plymouth	Former SR 143 north
Benton		180.66	290.74		I-82 / US 395 / Lewis and Clark Trail – Kennewick, Umatilla	Interchange, continues as McNary Road
1.000 mi = 1.609 km; 1.000 km = 0.621 mi: Concurrency terminus; Incomplete access; Tolled
