= Columbia Gorge Regional Airport =

Columbia Gorge Regional Airport The Dalles Municipal Airport
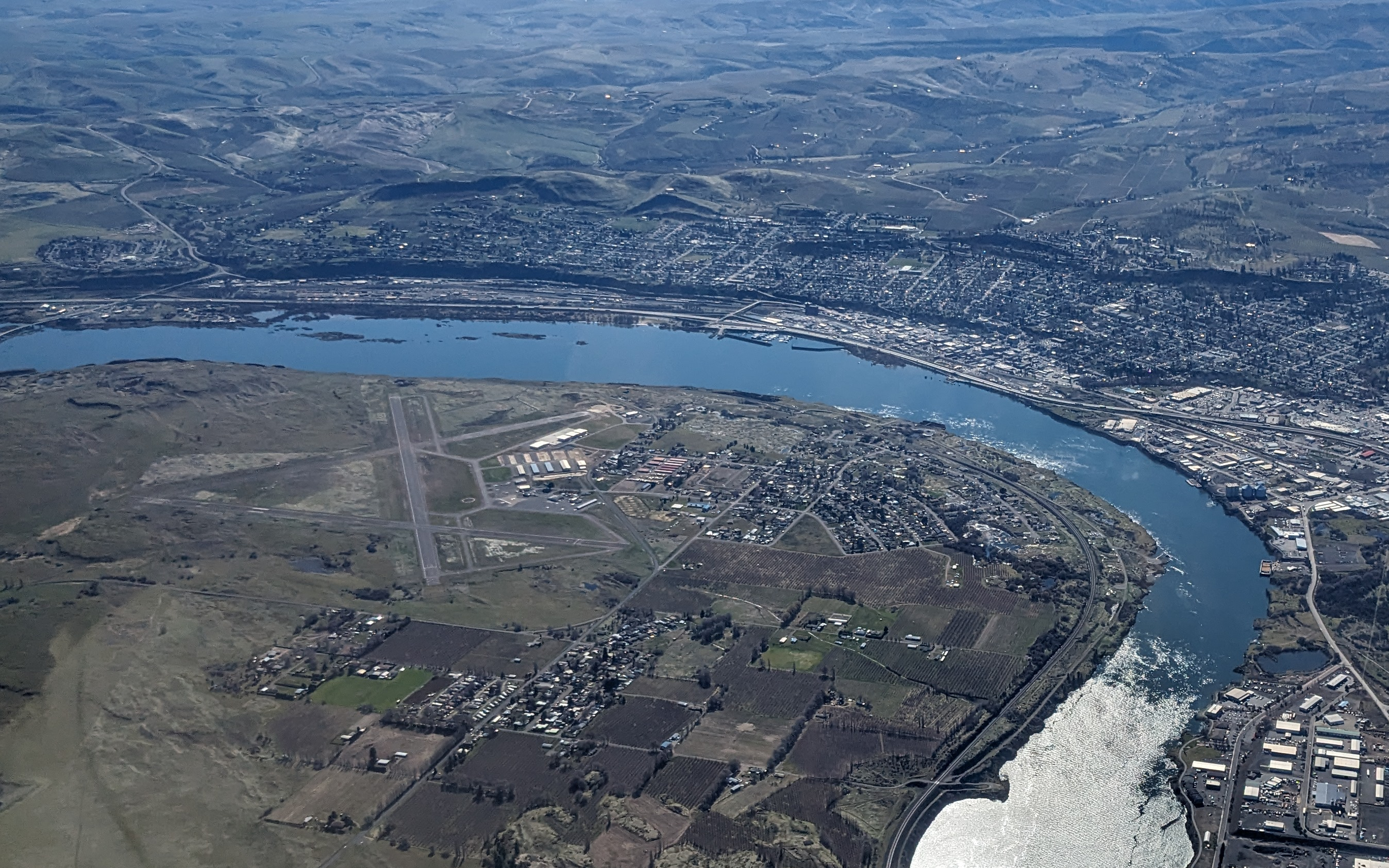
- IATA: DLS; ICAO: KDLS; FAA LID: DLS

Summary
- Airport type: Public
- Owner: City of The Dalles, Oregon
- Operator: City of The Dalles, Oregon & Klickitat County, Washington
- Serves: The Dalles, Oregon
- Location: Dallesport, Washington
- Elevation AMSL: 247 ft (75 m)
- Coordinates: 45°37′07″N 121°10′02″W
- Website: flycgra.com

Map
- Location in Washington, near Oregon border

Runways
Direction	Length		Surface
Direction	ft	m	Surface
7/25	4,647	1,416	Asphalt
13/31	5,097	1,554	Asphalt

Statistics (2019)
- Aircraft operations (year ending 1/28/2019): 16,282
- Based aircraft: 67
- Source: Federal Aviation Administration

Columbia Gorge Regional Airport (IATA: DLS, ICAO: KDLS, FAA LID: DLS), also referred to as The Dalles Municipal Airport, is a public use airport in Klickitat County in the U.S. state of Washington. It is located near Dallesport, Washington and two nautical miles (4 km) northeast of the city of The Dalles in the state of Oregon. This airport is included in the National Plan of Integrated Airport Systems for 2011–2015, which categorized it as a general aviation facility.

Despite being located in Washington, the airport is owned by the city of The Dalles (Oregon) since the 1940s and jointly operated with Klickitat County (Washington) since 2002. It is adjacent to the Columbia River, near the east end of the Columbia River Gorge National Scenic Area.

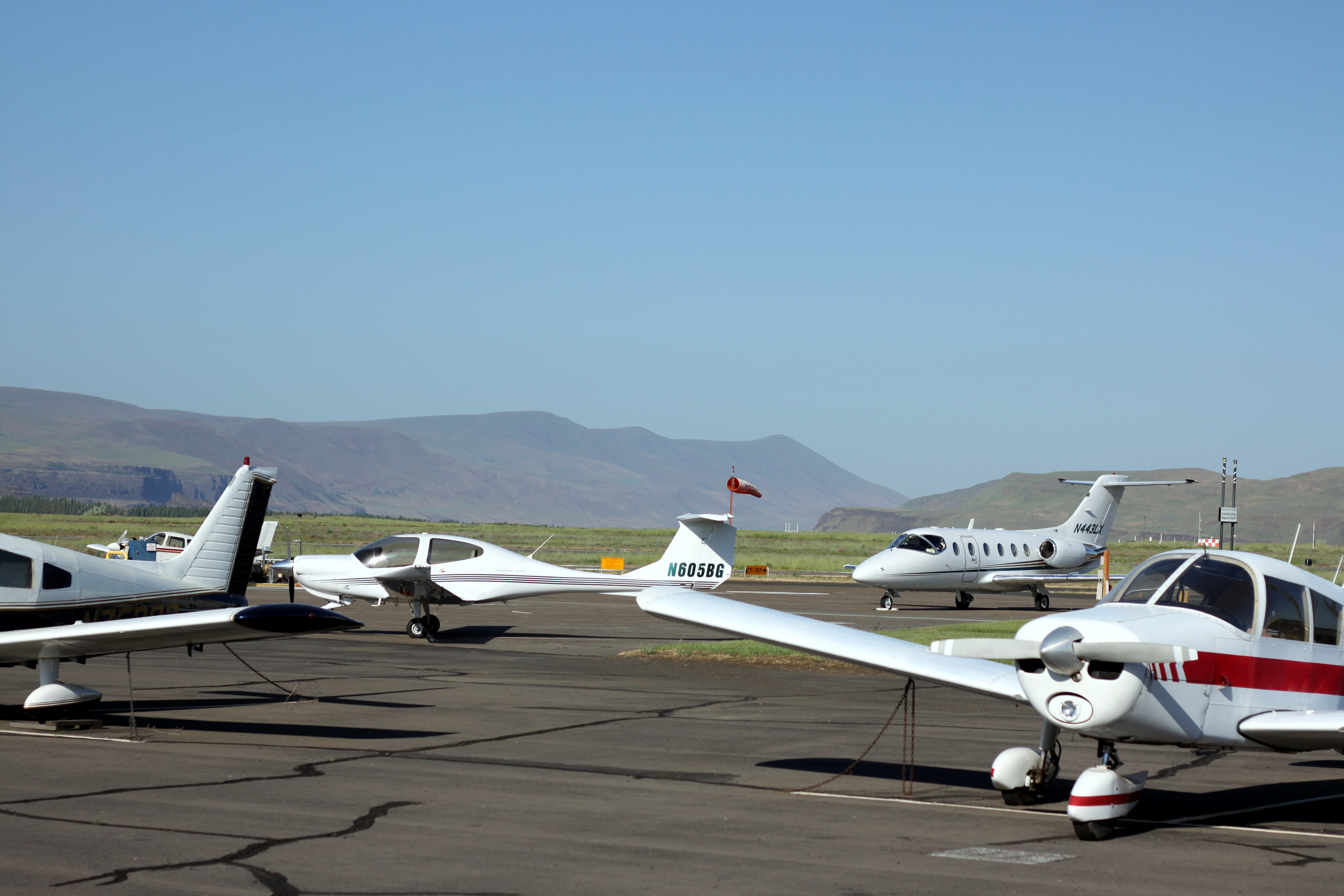
Aircraft parked at the airport, 2009

== History ==
The airport, originally a grass strip, was named Case Field, in memory of Walter E. Case, a local airmail pilot who was killed in flight.

During the Great Depression, the city was granted $12,000 by the Works Progress Administration (WPA), but that was later revoked in 1935 when the WPA learned the city only leased the airport.

The airport was moved slightly and reconstructed in cement and pavement in 1943. The airport was military surplus and became owned by the city of The Dalles, Oregon. In 2002, Klickitat County joined the city of The Dalles in a joint operating agreement.

United Airlines provided commercial service to the airport from Portland and Boise from 1953 to 1955.

== Facilities and aircraft ==
The airport covers an area of 997 acres (403 ha) at an elevation of 247 feet (75 m) above mean sea level. It has two runways with asphalt surfaces: 13/31 is 5,097 by 100 feet (1,554 x 30 m) and 7/25 is 4,647 by 100 feet (1,416 x 30 m).

For the 12-month period ending January 28, 2019, the airport had 16,282 aircraft operations, an average of 45 per day: 84% general aviation, 11% air taxi, and 5% military. At that time there were 67 aircraft based at this airport: 62 single-engine, 2 multi-engine, 2 helicopter, and 1 glider.
