= Washington State Route 500 =

State highway in Clark County, Washington, US

State Route 500
- A map of the Vancouver area with SR 500 highlighted in red

Route information
- Auxiliary route of I-5
- Maintained by WSDOT
- Length: 22.64 mi (36.44 km)
- Existed: 1964–present

Major junctions
- West end: I-5 in Vancouver
- I-205 in Vancouver; SR 503 in Orchards
- East end: SR 14 in Camas

Location
- Country: United States
- State: Washington
- Counties: Clark

Highway system
- State highways in Washington; Interstate; US; State; Scenic; Pre-1964; 1964 renumbering; Former
← SR 433	→ SR 501

State Route 500 (SR 500) is a state highway in Clark County, Washington, United States. The east–west highway runs through Vancouver as an expressway and its eastern suburbs as a country road, connecting Interstate 5 (I-5) to I-205 in eastern Vancouver and SR 14 in Camas. SR 500 runs concurrent to SR 503 within Orchards and also uses a section of the county-built Padden Parkway.

The highway originally followed Fourth Plain Boulevard, a local road built in the 1820s by fur traders and later extended east to Camas in the 1920s. It was added to the state highway system in 1937 as Secondary State Highway 8A (SSH 8A) and widened by the state government in the late 1960s. SSH 8A was replaced by SR 500 in the 1964 state highway renumbering, concurrent with state plans to build a parallel freeway to relieve traffic congestion on Fourth Plain Boulevard.

The state government constructed an expressway for SR 500 in the 1970s and 1980s, including an interchange with I-205 near the new Vancouver Mall. The expressway included several at-grade intersections with traffic signals that led to a high rate of rear-end collisions. The state government began converting these intersections into grade-separated interchanges in the 1990s, with the final right-in/right-out junctions opened in 2018. The eastern section of SR 500 in Orchards on Fourth Plain Boulevard was replaced with the Padden Parkway in 2005.

== Route description ==
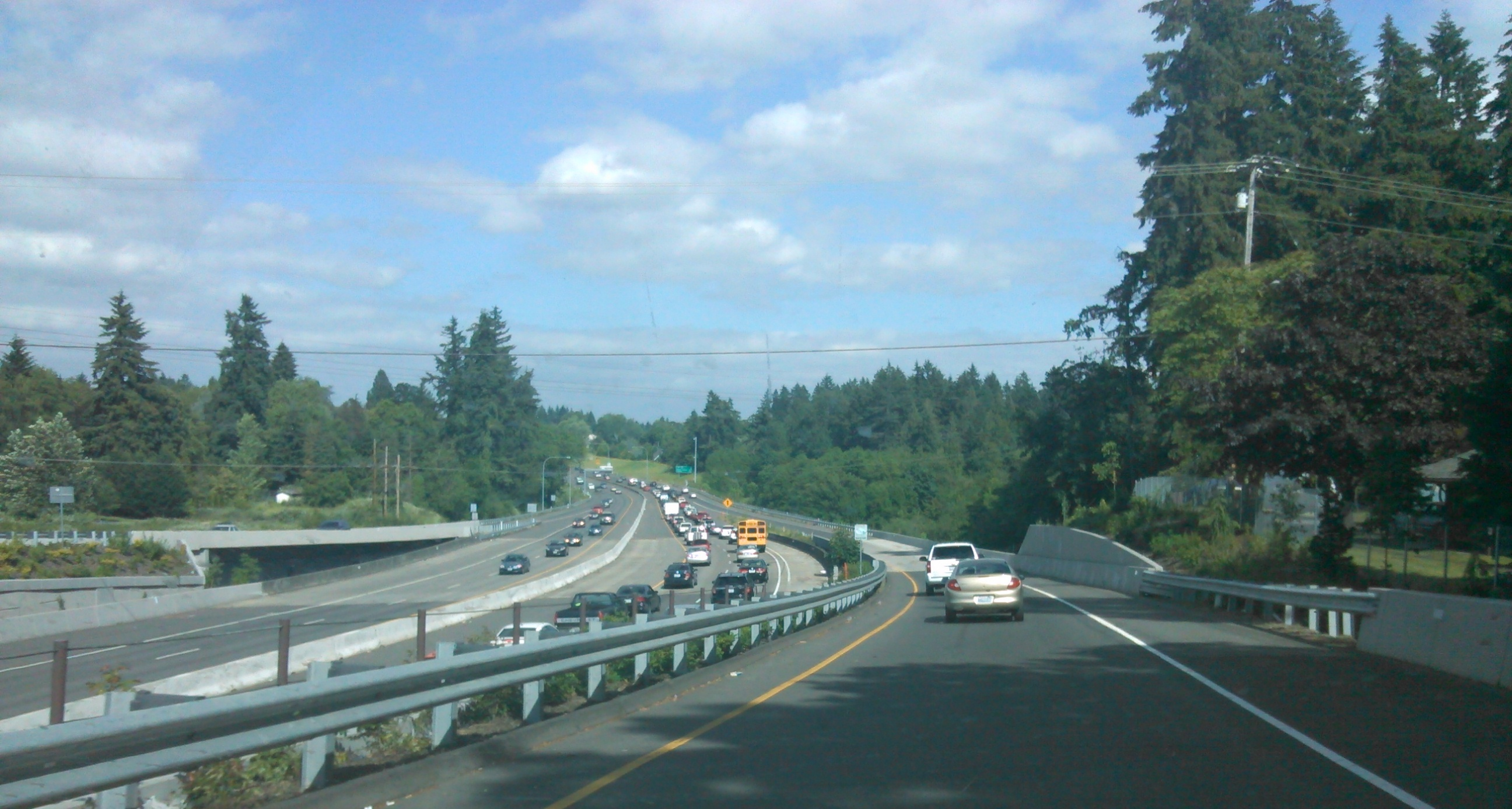
SR 500 near the St. Johns Boulevard interchange facing east

SR 500 begins northeast of downtown Vancouver as part of an interchange with I-5 and East 39th Street. The westbound lanes of SR 500 connect with an onramp to southbound I-5, while the eastbound lanes of SR 500 are fed by an offramp from northbound I-5; other movements to I-5 are accessed by a half-diamond interchange with Northeast 15th Avenue and East 39th Street. SR 500 travels southeast on a four-lane freeway along Burnt Bridge Creek to an interchange with St. Johns Boulevard and turns east to parallel Fourth Plain Boulevard through Vancouver's suburban neighborhoods. The freeway travels through two junctions at Falk Road (42nd Avenue) and Stapleton Road (54th Avenue) that are configured with right-in/right-out access, the former including a pedestrian overpass.

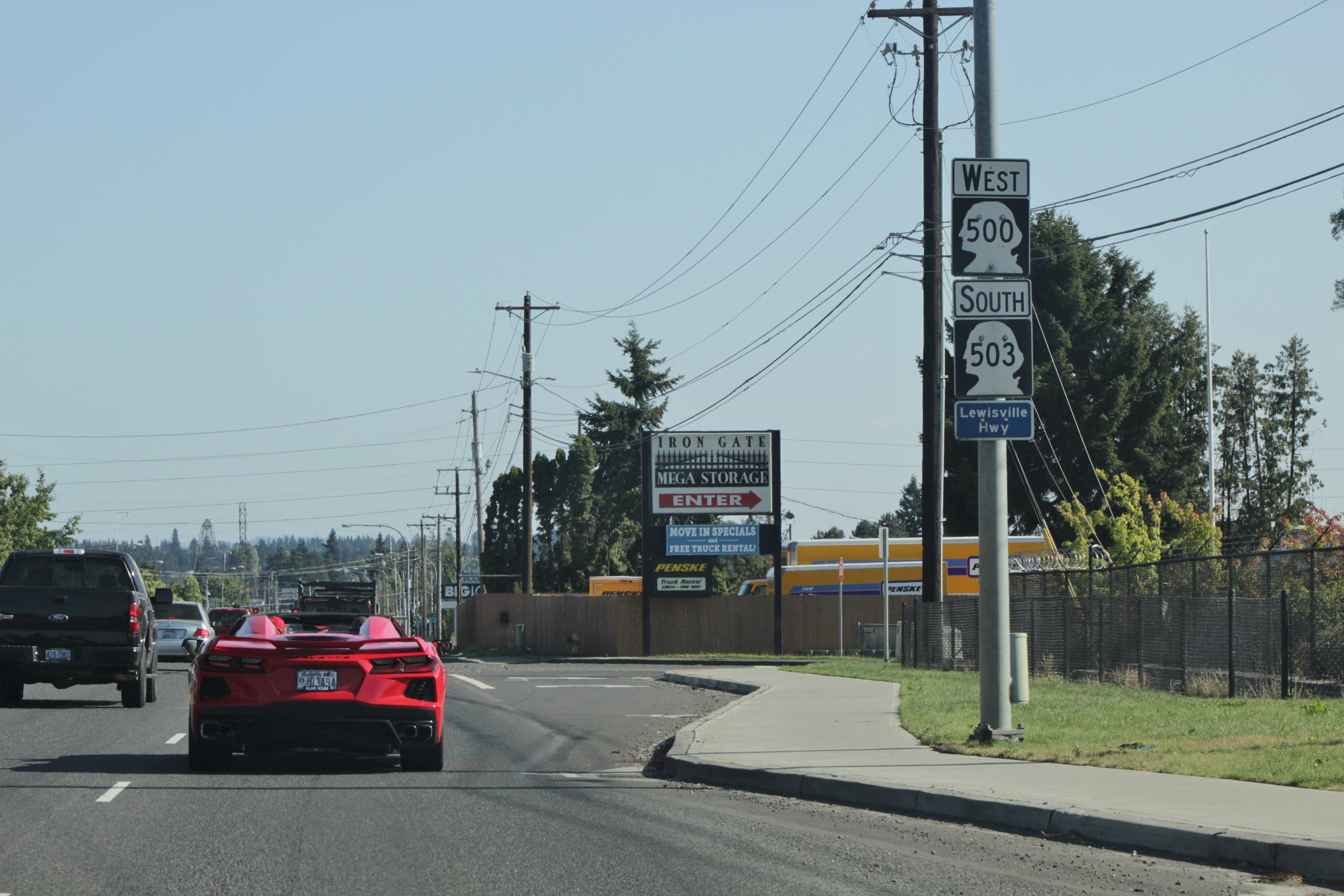
SR 500 and SR 503 run concurrently in Orchards.

SR 500 continues northeast and travels through a pair of single-point urban interchanges with Andresen Road and Thurston Way, the latter serving the Vancouver Mall complex on the north side of the highway. The freeway crosses under Fourth Plain Boulevard and reaches a cloverleaf interchange with I-205, the main freeway bypass of the Portland metropolitan area. After an interchange with Gher Road, the freeway ends and SR 500 turns north onto 117th Avenue, becoming concurrent with SR 503. The two highways enter Orchards and remain concurrent for one mile (1.6 km), splitting at an intersection with Padden Parkway. SR 503 continues north towards Battle Ground, while SR 500 turns east onto Padden Parkway, a limited-access expressway with infrequent intersections and a posted speed limit of 50 miles per hour (80 km/h). The parkway travels east across several suburban subdivisions and ends after merging with Ward Road, from which SR 500 turns south onto 162nd Avenue.

The highway remains on 162nd Avenue until an intersection with Fourth Plain Boulevard, which SR 500 follows east into rural and unincorporated Clark County. At Lacamas Creek in Proebstel, the highway dips south and continues along Northeast 58th Street until reaching Matney Creek, where it makes a series of stairstep turns onto local roads while traveling along the east side of Green Mountain. SR 500 then turns east onto Brunner Road and south onto 267th Avenue, passing Grove Field airport in Fern Prairie and briefly turning west before continuing south into Camas on Everett Street. The highway passes the south end of Lacamas Lake and travels into downtown Camas, where it runs east on 14th Avenue, south on Garfield Street, west on 3rd Avenue, and south on Dallas Street. Near the city's paper mill, SR 500 leaves downtown and crosses over the Washougal River, following a section of the BNSF Railway to Parker's Landing. The highway turns south onto Union Street and intersects SR 14 at a dogbone interchange, where SR 500 terminates.

SR 500 is maintained by the Washington State Department of Transportation (WSDOT), which conducts an annual survey on the state's highways to measure traffic volume in terms of annual average daily traffic. The busiest section of the highway, near the Vancouver Mall and I-205, carried a daily average of 72,000 vehicles in 2016; the least busiest section of the highway, at its eastern terminus in Camas, carried only 2,700 vehicles. The freeway section of SR 500 in Vancouver and the street shared with SR 503 in Orchards are designated as part of the National Highway System, a network of roads identified as important to the national economy, defense, and mobility. The freeway section of SR 500 has a posted speed limit of 50 to 55 miles per hour (80 to 89 km/h), which matches the rural section northwest of Camas; in suburban areas, the speed limit drops to 35 to 40 miles per hour (56 to 64 km/h).

== History ==
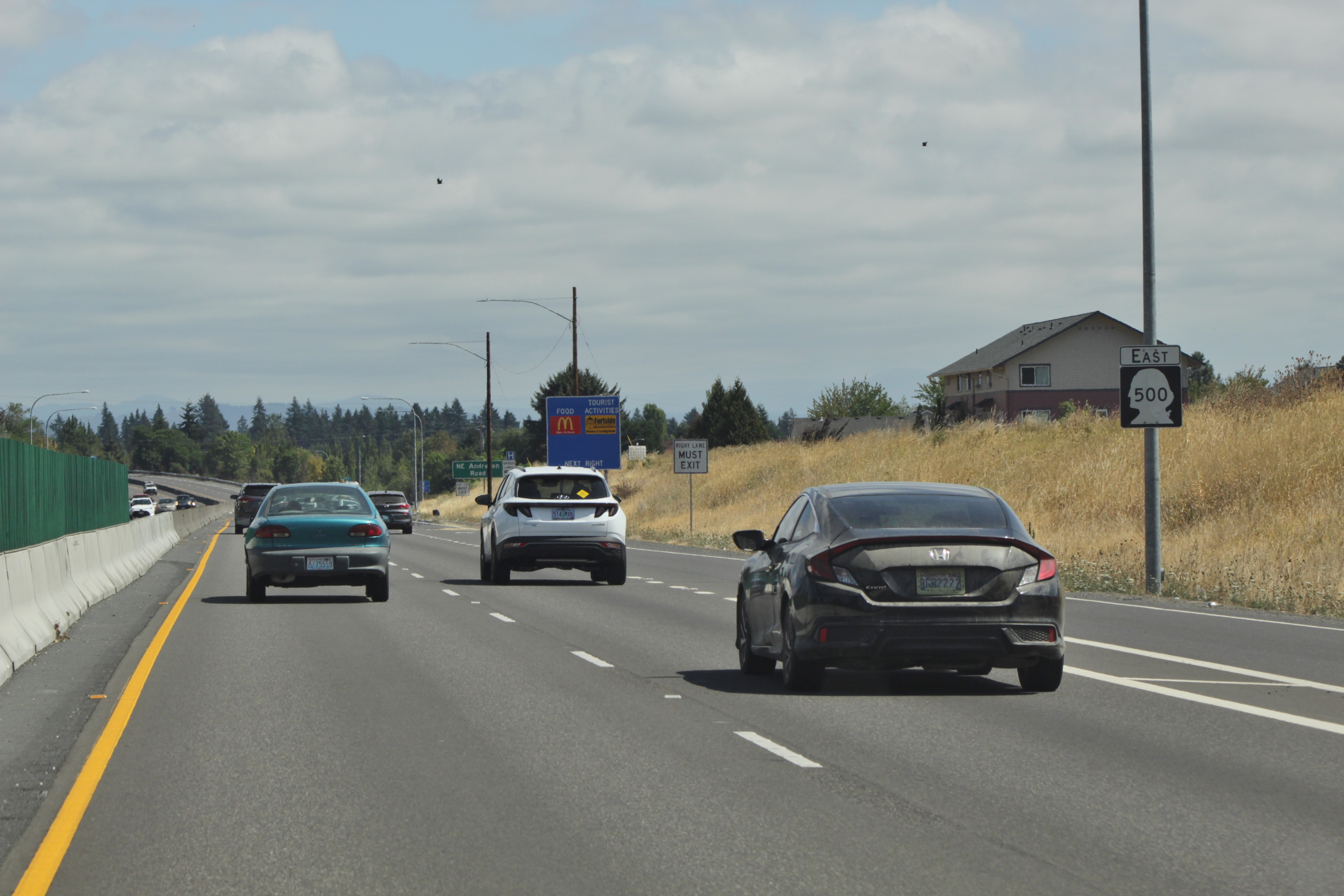
The expressway section of SR 500 in Vancouver

The SR 500 corridor was added to the state highway system in 1937 as Secondary State Highway 8A (SSH 8), a spur of Primary State Highway 8 (PSH 8) that ran from Vancouver to Camas via Orchards. The highway traveled along Fourth Plain Boulevard in eastern Vancouver, which was built by the Hudson's Bay Company in the 1820s and named for the Fourth Plain region. A series of country roads connecting the eastern outskirts of Fourth Plain with Camas were built by the 1920s to serve farmers, miners, and the military on the way to Camp Bonneville. The SR 500 designation replaced SSH 8A in the 1964 state highway renumbering and initially traveled through Vancouver on Fourth Plain Boulevard. The entire highway within Vancouver city limits, a distance of 1.4 miles (2.3 km), was widened to four lanes in 1965 at a cost of $258,000 due to increased traffic from eastern Vancouver.

The expressway section of SR 500 was constructed in the 1970s and 1980s to relieve the congested Fourth Plain Boulevard, but full interchanges were deferred due to budget issues. A section between Andresen Road and 112th Avenue, including the interchange with I-205, opened in December 1976. A 2.5-mile (4.0 km) section from St. Johns Road to Andresen Road was opened in November 1983 and was followed by an extension west to I-5 in 1984. The county government requested that SR 500 be designated the Henry M. Jackson Parkway in honor of the late Washington senator, but were denied by WSDOT. A high traffic volume contributed to a high rate of rear-end collisions and other vehicle accidents, averaging three injuries per week, leading to SR 500 being named the state's second most dangerous highway in 2002. WSDOT began converting the expressway into a full-fledged freeway in the 1990s, primarily by replacing intersections with grade-separated interchanges. The first new interchange to be built by the program, at Andresen Road near the Vancouver Mall, opened in 1995 and was the first single-point urban interchange to be built in Washington state. A direct onramp from westbound Fourth Plain Boulevard to eastbound SR 500 near I-205 was constructed in the late 1990s.

Replacements for all four of the remaining intersections on SR 500 west of Orchards were proposed unsuccessfully in several state budgets at the turn of the century. A single point urban interchange at Thurston Way near the Vancouver Mall was prioritized and used to test a design–build contract system, which was expected to save a year of planning and bidding time but cost $3 million more, and was completed in October 2002. On the east side of the mall and the I-205 interchange, the six-lane expressway's sole intersection at Gher Road and 112th Avenue was replaced with an interchange in October 2004, costing $26.5 million and funded by the Nickel Program gas tax. The state government also expanded a section of SR 500 between Andresen Road and SR 503 to six lanes as part of the project.

The expressway formerly ended east of the Gher Road junction at an intersection with SR 503 on 117th Avenue, with SR 500 turning east onto Fourth Plain Boulevard towards Camas. The Clark County government opened a parallel east–west expressway, the 5.9-mile (9.5 km) Padden Parkway, in stages between 1993 and 2003. SR 500 was re-aligned onto a section of Padden Parkway and Northeast 162nd Avenue in February 2005 by an action of the Washington State Transportation Commission, allowing Fourth Plain Boulevard to be transferred to county and city control.

Design work on the remaining interchange projects was halted in 2002, but resumed with new funding approved by the state legislature in 2006. A diamond interchange at St. Johns Boulevard was completed in September 2012, costing $48 million and eliminating one of the most collision-prone areas of SR 500. A set of direct ramps to northbound I-5 from SR 500 were planned to be built as part of the Columbia River Crossing project until it was dropped from the project in 2010. The final pair of intersections on the expressway portion of SR 500, at Falk Road and Stapleton Road, were the site of nearly 400 traffic incidents from 2012 to 2017—mostly rear-end collisions. The two intersections were reconfigured into right-in/right-out junctions with a continuous median barrier, costing $1 million and completed in October 2018. The Falk Road pedestrian overpass was retained, while a new crossing at Stapleton Road is planned to open in 2023.

The eastern terminus of SR 500 at SR 14 in Camas was converted into a dumbbell interchange with roundabouts in 2012 as part of a freeway extension through the area. Long-range plans proposed by WSDOT and the county government call for the remainder of SR 500 between Orchards and Camas to be upgraded to freeway standards. These plans have not been funded by the state government.

== Major intersections ==
The entire highway is in Clark County. All exits are unnumbered.

Location	mi	km	Destinations	Notes
Vancouver	0.00	0.00	I-5 south – Portland	Southbound entrance and northbound exit from I-5
Vancouver	0.40	0.64	Northeast 15th Avenue to I-5 north	Westbound exit and eastbound entrance
Vancouver	1.14	1.83	St. Johns Boulevard	
Vancouver	1.80	2.90	Falk Road / Northeast 42nd Avenue	Right-in, right-out access
Vancouver	2.38	3.83	Northeast Stapleton Road / Northeast 54th Avenue	Right-in, right-out access
Vancouver	3.12	5.02	Northeast Andresen Road	
Vancouver	3.90	6.28	Northeast Thurston Way – Vancouver Mall	
Vancouver	4.73	7.61	I-205 – Seattle, Salem	
Vancouver	5.43	8.74	Northeast Gher Road, Northeast 112th Avenue	
Vancouver	5.96	9.59	Eastern end of freeway	
Vancouver	5.96	9.59	SR 503 / Fourth Plain Boulevard – Camas	West end of SR 503 overlap
	6.98	11.23	SR 503 north / Padden Parkway – Brush Prairie, Battle Ground	East end of SR 503 overlap
Camas	22.64	36.44	SR 14 – Kennewick, Vancouver	Interchange
1.000 mi = 1.609 km; 1.000 km = 0.621 mi: Concurrency terminus; Incomplete access
