= Dallesport, Washington =

- Census-designated place
- Location of Dallesport in Klickitat County, Washington
- Coordinates: 45°37′32″N 121°10′19″W
- Country: United States
- State: Washington
- County: Klickitat

Area
  - Total: 7.55 sq mi (19.55 km^{2})
  - Land: 6.73 sq mi (17.44 km^{2})
  - Water: 0.81 sq mi (2.11 km^{2})
- Elevation: 233 ft (71 m)

Population (2020)
  - Total: 1,328
  - Density: 178/sq mi (68.9/km^{2})
- Time zone: UTC-8 (Pacific (PST))
  - Summer (DST): UTC-7 (PDT)
- ZIP code: 98617
- Area code: 509
- FIPS code: 53-16550
- GNIS feature ID: 2408639

Dallesport is an unincorporated community and census-designated place (CDP) in Klickitat County, Washington, United States. The population was 1,328 at the 2020 census.

== History ==
The location was traditionally a site of the Wishram tribe (called "Echeloots" by Lewis and Clark), who lived on the north bank of the Columbia River about 10 miles (16 km) in both directions from The Dalles, Oregon. Although the Wishrams were included in the Treaty of Yakima, they resisted removal to the Yakama Reservation. Indian burials from Memaloose Island in the Columbia were removed to the Wish-ham Cemetery near Dallesport prior to the filling of Lake Celilo. The loss of their traditional fishing grounds at Celilo Falls during the construction of The Dalles Dam in March 1957 dealt both a spiritual and an economic blow to the tribe.

Originally called "Rockport" or "Rockland Flats", Dallesport was the site of the first ferry crossing in the area, beginning in 1854. Rockland Flats was the original seat of Clickitat County (the name of the county was spelled with a "C" until an official name change in 1869), and remained so until 1878. Riverboat traffic moved up and down the river, but could not pass the falls at the Dalles and Celilo Falls. Portage was originally via a 19-mile-long (31 km) wagon road circumventing the falls. The Oregon Portage Railroad allowed passage of goods and travelers by rail beginning in 1863, but shippers chafed at the monopoly. In 1905, Congress approved an 8.5-mile (13.7 km) canal with locks on the north shore to bypass the falls. The Dalles-Celilo Canal opened May 5, 1915. The canal incorporated five locks with a total 90-foot (27 m) lift. The canal remained in use until it was flooded by The Dalles Dam in 1957.

The idea of a bridge crossing at this location was broached beginning in the late 19th century, but was not approved until 1947. The Dalles Bridge remained unbuilt until Congress approved The Dalles Dam in 1951. The bridge was opened December 18, 1953.

== Resources ==
The area is a flat peninsula created from the Columbia River during the big flood.

== Geography ==
Dallesport is located in southwestern Klickitat County. It sits on the north shore of the Columbia River and is bordered to the south, across the river, by The Dalles, Oregon.

Washington State Route 14 forms the northern edge of the Dallesport CDP and leads east (upriver) 17 miles (27 km) to Maryhill and west (downriver) the same distance to White Salmon. U.S. Route 197 forms the eastern edge of the CDP and has its northern terminus at SR 14. US 197 leads south across the Dalles Bridge into Oregon and runs 63 miles (101 km) to U.S. Route 97 south of Maupin.

Columbia Gorge Regional Airport is in the southeast part of the CDP, between the settled part of Dallesport and US 197.

According to the United States Census Bureau, the CDP has a total area of 7.6 square miles (19.6 km^{2}), of which 6.7 square miles (17.4 km^{2}) are land and 0.81 square miles (2.1 km^{2}), or 10.81%, are water within the Columbia River.

=== Climate ===
This region experiences warm (but not hot) and dry summers, with no average monthly temperatures above 71.6 °F.

According to the Köppen Climate Classification system, Dallesport has a warm-summer Mediterranean climate, abbreviated "Csb" on climate maps.

On June 28, 2021, Dallesport's high temperature of 118 °F (48 °C) tied the all-time Washington State heat record.

== Demographics ==
Historical population
Census	Pop.	Note	%±
2000	1,185		—
2010	1,202		1.4%
2020	1,328		10.5%
U.S. Decennial Census; 1990 2000 2010

Dallesport first appeared as a census designated place in the 2000 U.S. census.

=== Racial and ethnic composition ===
Dallesport CDP, Washington – Racial and ethnic composition Note: the US Census treats Hispanic/Latino as an ethnic category. This table excludes Latinos from the racial categories and assigns them to a separate category. Hispanics/Latinos may be of any race.
Race / Ethnicity (NH = Non-Hispanic)	Pop 2000	Pop 2010	Pop 2020	% 2000	% 2010	% 2020
White alone (NH)	1,035	1,051	1,054	87.34%	87.44%	79.37%
Black or African American alone (NH)	3	1	0	0.25%	0.08%	0.00%
Native American or Alaska Native alone (NH)	40	34	21	3.38%	2.83%	1.58%
Asian alone (NH)	19	14	9	1.60%	1.16%	0.68%
Native Hawaiian or Pacific Islander alone (NH)	0	0	0	0.00%	0.00%	0.00%
Other race alone (NH)	1	0	5	0.08%	0.00%	0.38%
Mixed race or Multiracial (NH)	43	34	84	3.63%	2.83%	6.33%
Hispanic or Latino (any race)	44	68	155	3.71%	5.66%	11.67%
Total	1,185	1,202	1,328	100.00%	100.00%	100.00%

=== 2000 census ===
As of the census of 2000, there were 1,185 people, 473 households, and 335 families residing in the CDP. The population density was 175.3 people per square mile (67.7/km^{2}). There were 525 housing units at an average density of 77.7/sq mi (30.0/km^{2}). The racial makeup of the CDP was 89.03% White, 0.25% African American, 3.46% Native American, 1.69% Asian, 1.94% from other races, and 3.63% from two or more races. Hispanic or Latino of any race were 3.71% of the population.

There were 473 households, out of which 30.2% had children under the age of 18 living with them, 57.9% were married couples living together, 9.7% had a female householder with no husband present, and 29.0% were non-families. 23.5% of all households were made up of individuals, and 6.8% had someone living alone who was 65 years of age or older. The average household size was 2.51 and the average family size was 2.96.

In the CDP, the population was spread out, with 27.8% under the age of 18, 5.5% from 18 to 24, 23.5% from 25 to 44, 30.3% from 45 to 64, and 12.8% who were 65 years of age or older. The median age was 40 years. For every 100 females, there were 92.1 males. For every 100 females age 18 and over, there were 98.4 males.

The median income for a household in the CDP was $36,250, and the median income for a family was $41,689. Males had a median income of $40,250 versus $21,853 for females. The per capita income for the CDP was $17,995. About 12.0% of families and 17.6% of the population were below the poverty line, including 22.3% of those under age 18 and 18.6% of those age 65 or over.
