= Franz Lake National Wildlife Refuge =

Wildlife refuge in southwest Washington

- IUCN category IV (habitat/species management area)
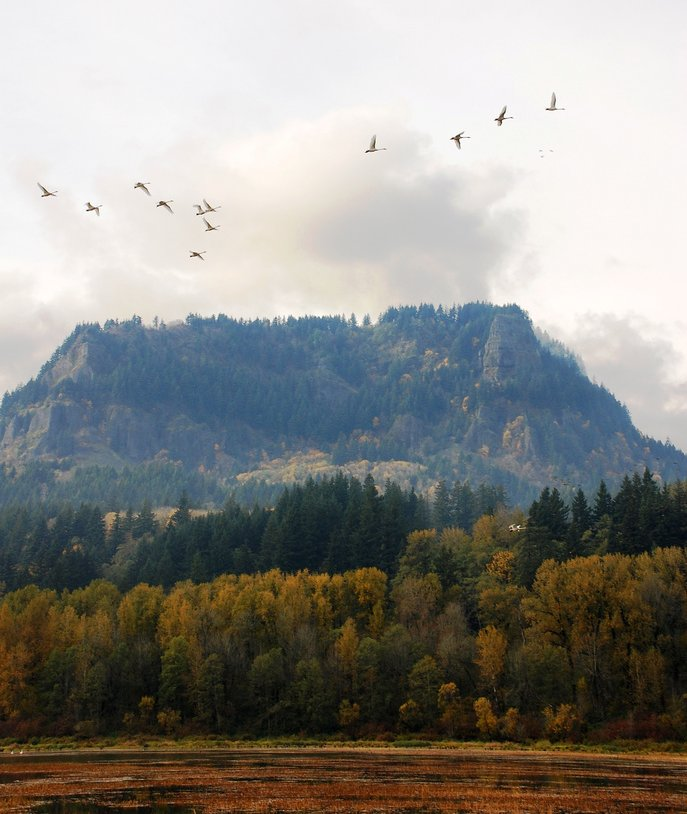

- Location within Washington (state)
- Location: Skamania County, Washington
- Nearest city: Washougal
- Coordinates: 45.6051177°N 122.0784186°W
- Area: 551.73 acres (223.28 ha)
- Established: 1990
- Governing body: U.S. Fish and Wildlife Service
- Website: Franz Lake National Wildlife Refuge

Franz Lake National Wildlife Refuge is located in southwest Washington state, within the Columbia River Gorge National Scenic Area. The refuge provides a variety of habitats including riparian wetlands, Columbia River riparian corridor blocks, transitional woodlands from lower elevation willows, and cottonwoods to mid-elevation old-growth fir and cedar with associated native understory shrubs, open meadows, and numerous streams and seeps.

Franz and Arthur lakes contain healthy stands of wapato (Sagittaria latifolia), which provide an important wintering habitat for tundra swans and other waterfowl. As many as 1,000 wintering tundra swans have been observed on Franz Lake. Other common waterfowl include western Canada geese, mallards, northern pintails, gadwalls, green-winged teal, northern shovelers, canvasbacks, ring-necked ducks, and American wigeon. The refuge also provides abundant habitat for wading birds such as great blue herons and rails, as well as songbirds that use grass/sedge meadows, cattail ponds, willow thickets, and riparian forests. Other wildlife commonly observed on the refuge include gulls, band-tailed pigeons, red-tailed hawks, crows, killdeer, western painted turtles, Pacific tree frogs, western toads, garter snakes, and California ground squirrels.

Several springs and seeps on the refuge have been identified as critical brood areas for Coho salmon and other juvenile salmonids. The refuge may be viewed from an overlook located off-refuge along State Highway 14. Arranged group tours are also available.
