= Washington State Route 21 =

North-south state highway in Washington, US

State Route 21
- SR 21 highlighted in red

Route information
- Maintained by WSDOT
- Length: 191.34 mi (307.93 km)
- Existed: 1964–present

Major junctions
- South end: SR 260 in Kahlotus
- US 395 in Lind; I-90 near Lind; US 2 in Wilbur
- North end: Highway 41 at the Canadian border in Danville

Location
- Country: United States
- State: Washington
- Counties: Franklin, Adams, Lincoln, Ferry

Highway system
- State highways in Washington; Interstate; US; State; Scenic; Pre-1964; 1964 renumbering; Former
← SR 20	→ SR 22

State Route 21 (SR 21) is a 191.34-mile-long (307.93 km) state highway in the U.S. state of Washington that traverses four counties: Franklin, Adams, Lincoln and Ferry. The highway extends from an intersection with SR 260 in Kahlotus north through Lind, Odessa, Clark, Keller, Republic and Curlew before becoming Highway 41 (BC 41) at the Canadian border in Danville. SR 21 is concurrent with U.S. Route 2 (US 2) in Wilbur and SR 20 in Republic and has two diamond interchanges at US 395 in Lind and Interstate 90 (I-90) south of Odessa. Between Lincoln and Ferry counties, the roadway crosses Franklin D. Roosevelt Lake on the Keller Ferry, operated fare free by the Washington State Department of Transportation (WSDOT) and the Department of Highways (DoH) since 1930.

Since 1899, at least one segment of the current highway has been in the state highway system. In 1899, the Marble Mount Road was established and later numbered State Road 4 in 1905 and renamed to the Sans Poil-Loomis Road in 1907. In 1915, a branch to the Canadian border was added to the highway, but was removed in 1923. In 1937, the Primary state highways were established and State Road 4 became Primary State Highway 4 (PSH 4), while the former Canadian branch became Secondary State Highway 4A (SSH 4A). Another highway, extending from Lind to Wilbur, became SSH 4B. In 1964, PSH 4 was split into SR 20 and SR 21 while SSH 2A and SSH 2B also became SR 21. In 1983, a road between Lind and Kahlotus became part of SR 21.

The Keller Ferry, which travels across the Columbia River at Franklin D. Roosevelt Lake to connect the two segments of SR 21, was originally a private cable ferry operated in the early 1890s. In 1929, the Ferry and Lincoln counties unveiled a new eight-car cable ferry, named the Keller of Seattle, which served the two counties until 1930. The state highway department took over operations of the ferry in 1930 and replaced the vessel with various boats until a permanent ferry, the Martha S., was launched in 1948. The Martha S. would go on to serve until 2013, when it was retired and replaced with the more modern MV Sanpoil.

== Route description ==
SR 21 originates at an intersection with SR 260, about 0.28 miles (0.45 km) west of the northern terminus of SR 263; both intersections are in the city of Kahlotus, which is located in a narrow valley near several coulees in Franklin County. After leaving Kahlotus as the Lind–Kahlotus Road, the highway turns northeast and later west as it passes over the Sand Hills Coulee four times. Curving due north, the roadway leaves Franklin County to enter Adams County. Passing farmland in the flat landscape, SR 21 intersects SR 26 and continues through an unnamed coulee to intersect Smart Road. Smart Road was the former alignment of SR 21 prior to the U.S. Route 395 (US 395) interchange being built. SR 21 intersects US 395 in a diamond interchange east of Downtown Lind. From the interchange, the highway travels west and intersects Smart Road again before crossing over the Centennial Trail and entering Downtown Lind. In Downtown, the roadway is named Second, I and First Streets and serves as the main connector to other areas. After turning north to leave Lind, the road encounters the Palouse to Cascades State Park Trail and more plains before intersecting the pre-interstate alignment of Interstate 90 (I-90) and interchanging with I-90 at exit 206, another diamond interchange. North of the interchange, SR 21 travels through more plains and a coulee to leave Adams County and enter Lincoln County.

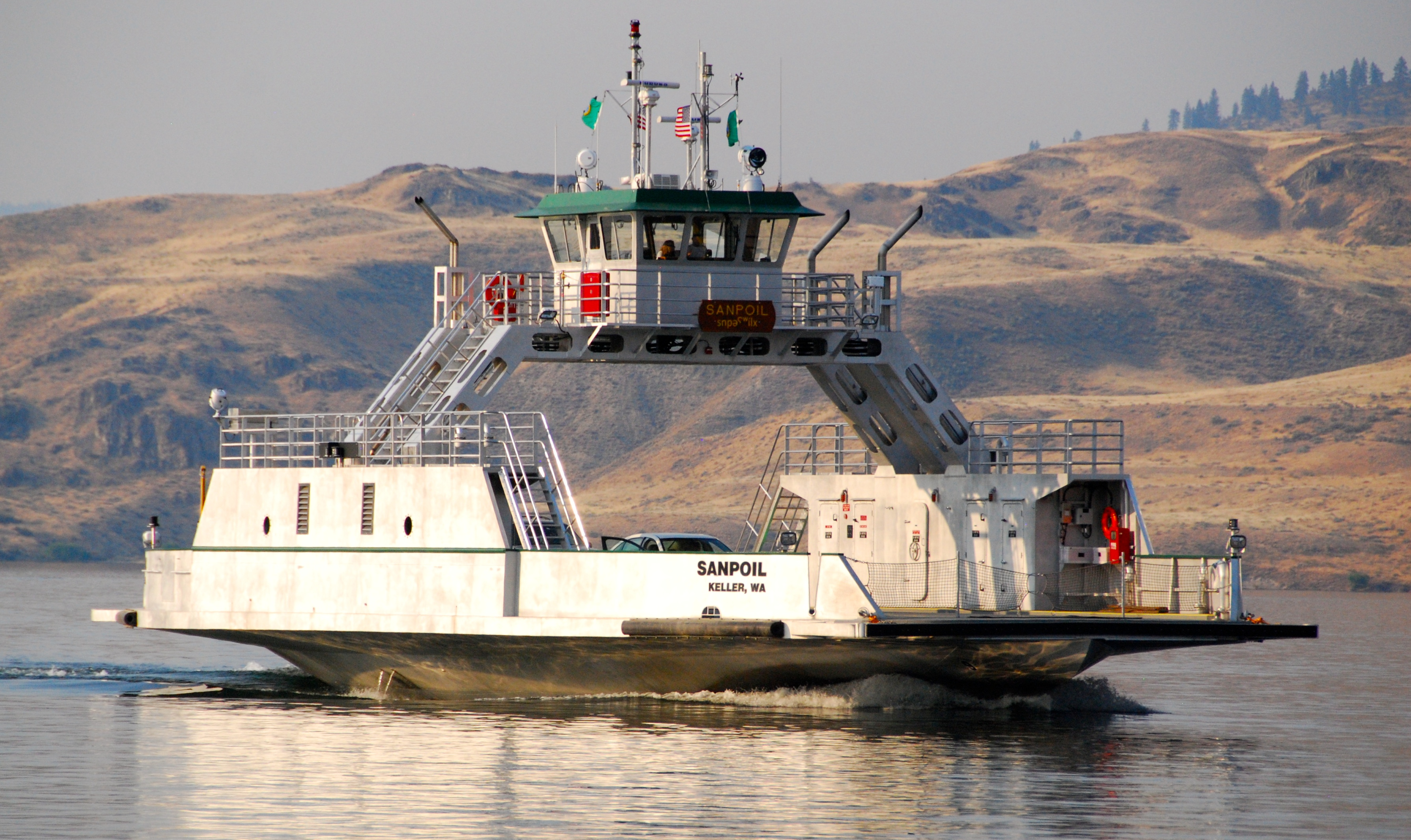
The Keller Ferry connects SR 21 on the sides of the Franklin D. Roosevelt Lake, part of the Lake Roosevelt National Recreation Area, between Lincoln and Ferry counties.

In Lincoln County, the highway travels through farmland to encounter Odessa as Division Street, intersecting SR 28. The roadway turns northwest at Pacific Lake and reverts northwards into farmland. After temporarily turning east into more farmland, the road enters Wilbur, named Bruce Avenue. In Wilbur, SR 21 turns west, concurrent with US 2, for 0.65 miles (1.05 km) before branching off north to intersect SR 174 and leave Wilbur over rolling farmland. North of Wilbur, the roadway enters the top of Speigle Canyon and makes a winding descent before exiting at the floor of the canyon and nearing Franklin D. Roosevelt Lake; at 80,000 acres (323.75 km^{2}), the lake is the largest in Washington. Paralleling the lake, the road then uses the Keller Ferry, an 80-foot (24.38 m) long boat used as a fare-free ferry across Franklin D. Roosevelt Lake, part of the Lake Roosevelt National Recreation Area, operated by the Washington State Department of Transportation (WSDOT) and its previous counterparts since 1930.

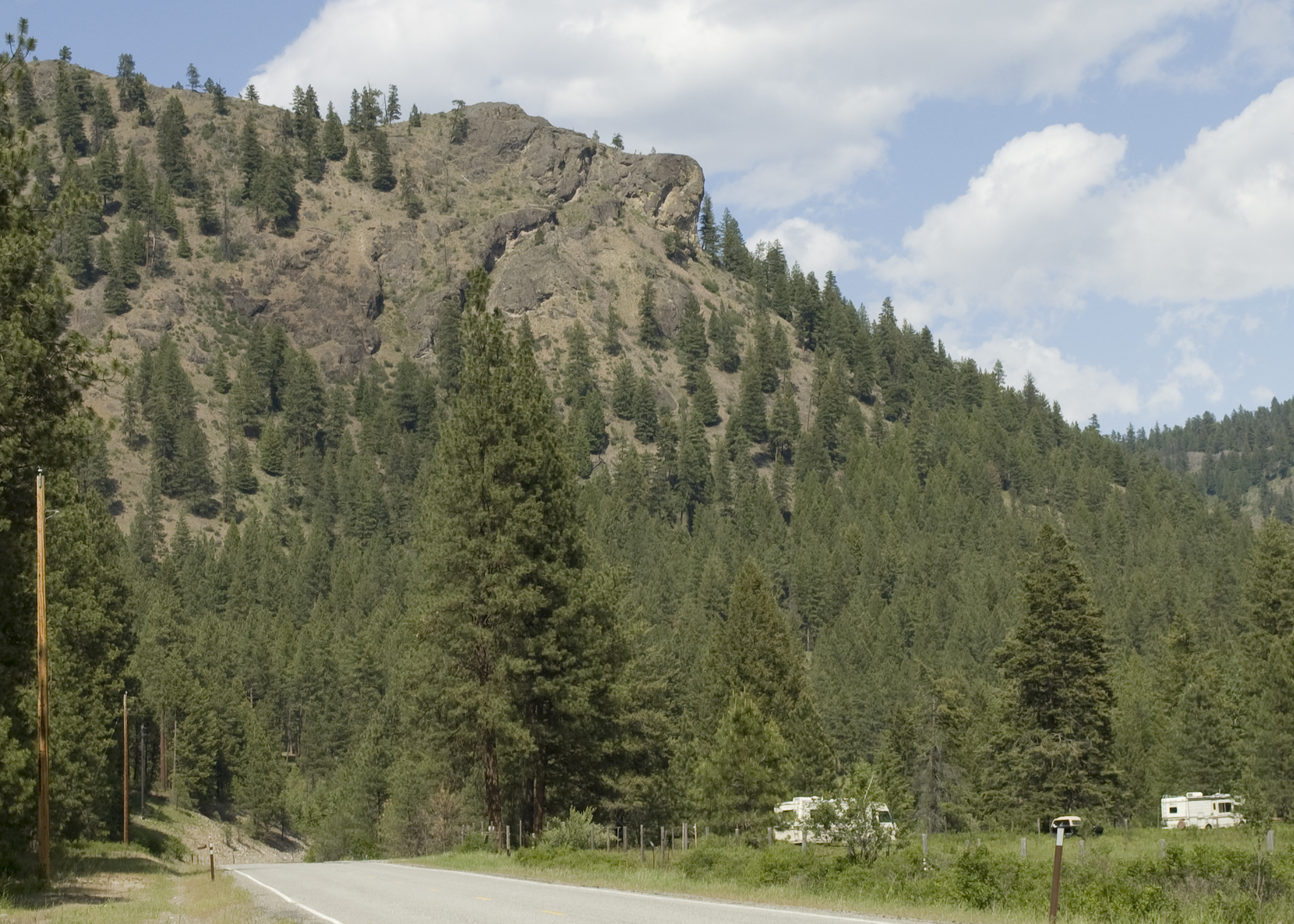
A hill south of Republic on SR 21, which is parallel to the Sanpoil River between Keller and Republic.

The ferry travels across the Lincoln County line to enter Ferry County, named after Elisha P. Ferry, the first Washington governor, southwest of Keller in the Colville Indian Reservation. Traveling northeast, between the Sanpoil River and the southern end of the Okanagan Highlands, SR 21 passes Keller and continues inland into the Columbia Mountains on the banks of the river. The river forms a canyon that the highway passes through and eventually both the river and road leave the Colville Indian Reservation. Shortly after leaving the reservation, the roadway enters Republic and becomes concurrent with SR 20 for 2.56 miles (4.12 km) before exiting the concurrency and Republic. Between Republic and the Canada–US border, an estimated daily average of 1,600 motorists used this segment of SR 21, making this section the busiest. The daily average has declined since 2006 and 2007, when a daily average of 1,700 motorists utilized the segment. Northeast of Republic, the highway passes Curlew Lake, the 123-acre (0.50 km^{2}) Curlew Lake State Park and the communities of Malo and Curlew. After passing through more dense forests, the roadway enters Danville, where SR 21 crosses the Canada–US border into British Columbia as Highway 41 (BC 41). BC 41 continues 1.2 kilometres (0.7 mi) north to end at BC 3 southwest of Grand Forks, BC.

== History ==
A map of Primary State Highway 4 (PSH 4, 1937—1964), which later became SR 21 during the 1964 highway renumbering.

SR 21 originated as the Marble Mount Road that extended from the north end of the Keller Ferry to Republic and was established in 1899. The Marble Mount Road was later numbered State Road 4 in 1905 and renamed to the Sans Poil-Loomis Road in 1907. An extension of State Road 4 from Republic to the Canada–US border existed from 1915 until 1923. When the Primary and secondary highway system was established in 1937, Primary State Highway 4 (PSH 4) replaced State Road 4 and was extended south from the Keller Ferry to Wilbur. The Canada–US border branch of State Road 4 that was deleted in 1923 was re-added as Secondary State Highway 4A (SSH 4A) and a highway extending south from Wilbur to Lind became SSH 2B. All three roadways were later combined as SR 21 in a highway renumbering in 1964. In 1983, SR 21 was extended south to SR 260 in Kahlotus.

Since 1983, the road has not been realigned with the exception of the U.S. Route 395 (US 395) interchange in Lind. A proposal to remove the Kahlotus–Lind section of the highway was considered by a legislative committee in 1986. The speed limit between Curlew Lake State Park and the community of the same name was temporarily lowered on March 9, 2009 to 35 miles per hour (56 km/h) due to cracks in the pavement. The speed limit was restored to 55 miles per hour (89 km/h) on March 30, 2009.

=== Keller Ferry history ===
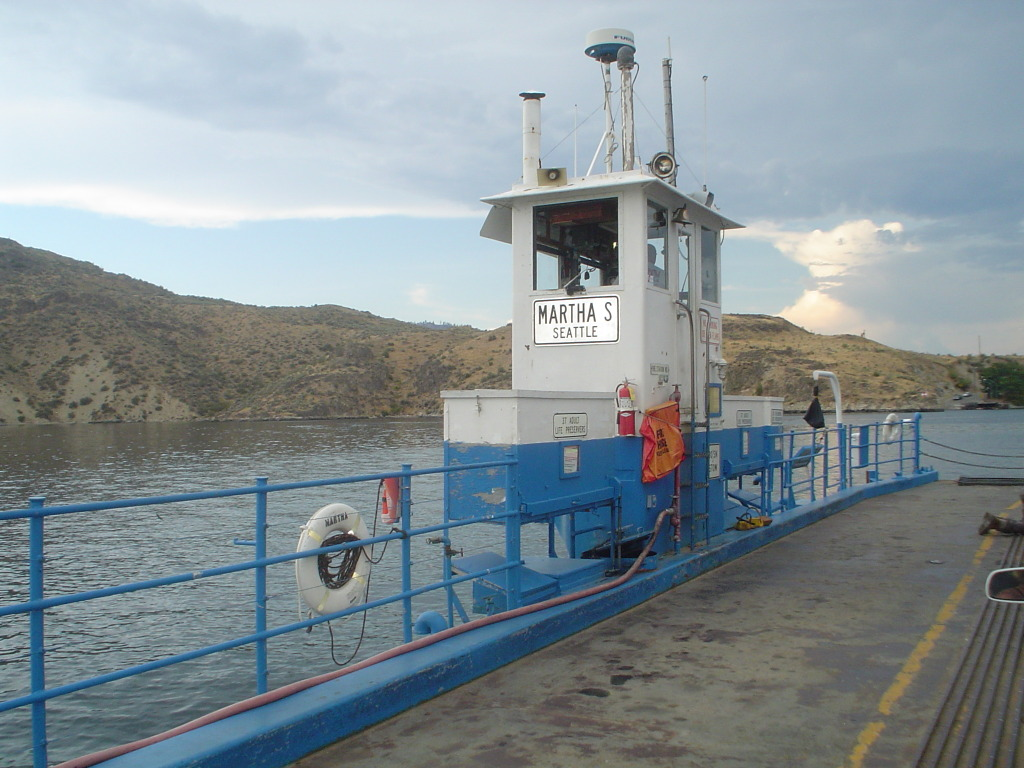
The Martha S. was used on the Keller Ferry route from September 9, 1948-July 7, 2013, just two months short of 65 years.

The Keller Ferry connects SR 21 between Lincoln and Ferry counties, which are separated by Franklin D. Roosevelt Lake. The ferry originated as an oar-propelled canoe that was used by Native Americans prior to the late 19th century. In the early 1890s a four-car cable ferry, owned and operated by Todd Clark and William Robertson, was established. After the town of Keller was established north / upriver on the Sanpoil River in 1898, J.C. Keller, the founder of the town, purchased the cable ferry in 1899. In 1925, Lincoln and Ferry counties jointly purchased Keller's ferry and in 1929 replaced the original ferry with an eight-car cable ferry that was later named Keller of Seattle. The Department of Highways (DoH), the predecessor to the modern-day Washington State Department of Transportation (WSDOT), purchased the ferry on September 1, 1930 and ran it toll-free as it is today. The original location of the ferry was flooded between 1939 and 1940 after the damming of the Grand Coulee Dam west / downriver on the Columbia River created Franklin D. Roosevelt Lake. In July 1939, the L.A. McLeod was launched and replaced the earlier cable ferries. Between 1944 and 1948, the Ann of Wilbur, a tug boat, tugged the Sanpoil barge that was used as a temporary replacement for the McLeod. On September 9, 1948, the Martha S. was launched and has been in continual operation since. Since the Martha S. is over seventy years old, the United States Coast Guard requires that the ferry undergo a full drydock inspection every five years. As of 2009, WSDOT is $5.5 million US$ short of being able to replace the ferry. Design work has already been completed, but the ferry is not expected to be replaced yet. The Keller Ferry was repaired on February 15, 2007 to expand its lifespan; WSDOT detoured traffic onto SR 174. The Martha S. had a leak that was discovered in October 2009 and is suspended. Traffic has been detoured onto other highways. Ferry service resumed on October 19, but one of the two engines overheated on October 26, only one week later, needing to be replaced, thus shutting down the ferry a second time during the same month. Due to the prohibitive cost of having to specially manufacture many replacement parts, the Martha S was retired on July 7, 2013. It was replaced with the new M/V Sanpoil, which made its maiden run on August 14, 2013.

== Major intersections ==
County	Location	mi	km	Destinations	Notes
Franklin	Kahlotus	0.00	0.00	SR 260 – Connell, Washtucna	Southern terminus
Adams		11.64	18.73	SR 26 – Vantage, Othello, Colfax	
Adams		22.14	35.63	Smart Road	Former SR 21
Adams	Lind	24.48	39.40	US 395 – Pasco, Connell, Ritzville	Interchange
Adams	Lind	25.42	40.91	Smart Road / Airport Road	Former SR 21
Adams		37.32	60.06	Old SR 90	
Adams		37.80	60.83	I-90 – Seattle, Ritzville, Spokane	Interchange
Lincoln	Odessa	55.83	89.85	SR 28 – Wenatchee, Ephrata, Davenport	
Lincoln	Wilbur	91.73	147.63	US 2 east – Davenport, Spokane, Newport	Southern end of US 2 concurrency
Lincoln	Wilbur	92.38	148.67	US 2 west – Wenatchee, Snohomish, Everett	Northern end of US 2 concurrency
Lincoln	Wilbur	92.90	149.51	SR 174 west – Grand Coulee Dam, Grand Coulee	Eastern terminus of SR 174
Franklin D. Roosevelt Lake		106.60	171.56	Keller Ferry	
Ferry	Republic	160.05	257.58	SR 20 west – Okanogan, Twisp, Burlington	Southern end of SR 20 concurrency
Ferry	Republic	162.61	261.70	SR 20 east – Kettle Falls, Colville, Newport	Northern end of SR 20 concurrency
Ferry	Curlew	181.31	291.79	Curlew Bridge (Ferry Street)	Former SR 21
Ferry		191.34	307.93	Highway 41 north – Grand Forks	Northern terminus; Canada–United States border
1.000 mi = 1.609 km; 1.000 km = 0.621 mi
