= Washington State Route 263 =

State highway in Franklin County, Washington, US

State Route 263
- Devils Canyon Road
- SR 263 highlighted in red

Route information
- Auxiliary route of SR 26
- Maintained by WSDOT
- Length: 9.24 mi (14.87 km)
- Existed: 1991–present

Major junctions
- South end: Port of Windust
- North end: SR 260 in Kahlotus

Location
- Country: United States
- State: Washington
- Counties: Franklin

Highway system
- State highways in Washington; Interstate; US; State; Scenic; Pre-1964; 1964 renumbering; Former
← SR 262	→ SR 270

State Route 263 (SR 263, also known as Devils Canyon Road) is a 9.24-mile (14.87 km) long state highway in the U.S. state of Washington, serving rural Franklin County and the Lower Monumental Dam. The highway begins at the Port of Windust on the Snake River and travels east to the Lower Monumental Dam and north to SR 260 in Kahlotus, paralleling the Columbia Plateau Trail. Devils Canyon carried traffic on the Spokane, Portland and Seattle Railway in the early 20th century before the completion of a road serving the Lower Monumental Dam in 1961. The Devils Canyon Road was paved and signed as SR 263 in 1991 and the railroad became the Columbia Plateau Trail the same year.

== Route description ==
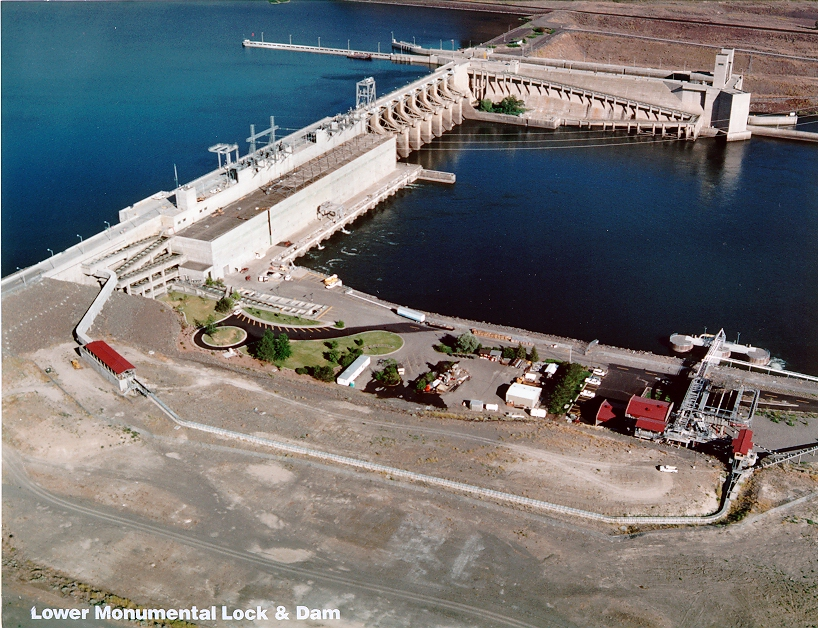
Aerial view of the Lower Monumental Dam, served by SR 263, on the Snake River

SR 263 begins at the Port of Windust along the northern shores of the Snake River in rural Franklin County. The highway travels east past Windust Park along hills to the northwest and the riverbank on the southeast banks, part of Burr Canyon. At the Lower Monumental Dam, the roadway turns north into the narrow Devils Canyon and follows the Columbia Plateau Trail. The highway enters Kahlotus and becomes Spokane Street before ending at SR 260.

Every year the Washington State Department of Transportation (WSDOT) conducts a series of surveys on its highways in the state to measure traffic volume. This is expressed in terms of annual average daily traffic (AADT), which is a measure of traffic volume for any average day of the year. In 2011, WSDOT calculated that between 70 and 290 vehicles per day used the highway, a decrease from previous years.

== History ==
Devils Canyon was originally home to the Portland–Spokane line of the Spokane, Portland and Seattle Railway, completed in 1908 with a small tunnel near the north bank of the Snake River. The United States Army Corps of Engineers built an improved Devils Canyon Road to connect Kahlotus to a grain facility owned by the newly established Port of Kahlotus in 1961. The Lower Monumental Dam on the Snake River was completed in February 1969 and opened in May of the same year at the south end of Devils Canyon. The rail line fell into disuse by 1987 and the right-of-way was acquired by the Washington State Park System in 1991 to become the Columbia Plateau Trail.

A state legislative committee received proposals to add the Windust–Kahlotus road to the state highway system in 1986. The road was designated as State Route 263 (SR 263) in 1991 and signed into law on April 1, 1992 to serve the Port of Kahlotus, now the Port of Windust, and connect to the existing SR 260 in Kahlotus. No major revisions have occurred since the signing of the highway in 1961, however a landslide in July 2012 closed the highway for two days as Washington State Department of Transportation crews cleared up to 4,500 cubic yards (3,440 m^{3}) of debris and repaired damaged asphalt.

== Major intersections ==
The entire highway is in Franklin County.

Location	mi	km	Destinations	Notes
Windust	0.00	0.00	Port of Windust	Southern terminus
Kahlotus	9.24	14.87	SR 260 – Connell, Washtucna, Colfax	Northern terminus
1.000 mi = 1.609 km; 1.000 km = 0.621 mi
