= Washington State Route 26 =

State highway in central Washington, US

State Route 26
- SR 26 highlighted in red

Route information
- Maintained by WSDOT
- Length: 133.61 mi (215.02 km)
- Existed: 1964–present
- Tourist routes: Palouse Scenic Byway

Major junctions
- West end: I-90 near Vantage
- SR 24 in Othello; SR 17 in Othello; US 395 near Hatton; SR 260 / SR 261 in Washtucna
- East end: US 195 in Colfax

Location
- Country: United States
- State: Washington
- Counties: Grant, Adams, Whitman

Highway system
- State highways in Washington; Interstate; US; State; Scenic; Pre-1964; 1964 renumbering; Former
← SR 25	→ SR 27

State Route 26 (SR 26) is a state highway in central Washington in the United States. It travels east–west for 114 miles (183 km) from Interstate 90 (I-90) near Vantage to U.S. Route 195 (US 195) in Colfax. The highway intersects several major north–south highways, including SR 24, SR 17, US 395, and SR 261 before ending in Colfax. The route serves as a connector between Vantage, Royal City, Othello, Washtucna, La Crosse, and Colfax.

The easternmost section of SR 26, between Dusty and Colfax was formerly part of the Inland Empire Highway and US 295 for most of the early 20th century. The rest of modern SR 26 was added to the state highway system in 1937 and 1951 as Secondary State Highway 11B (SSH 11B) from Washtucna to Dusty and SSH 7C from Vantage to Washtucna, respectively. The two highways were combined to form SR 26 in the 1964 state highway renumbering, but several sections of the highway were not completed until the 1970s. SR 26 initially terminated at Dusty, but was extended to Colfax over SR 127 in 1979.

== Route description ==
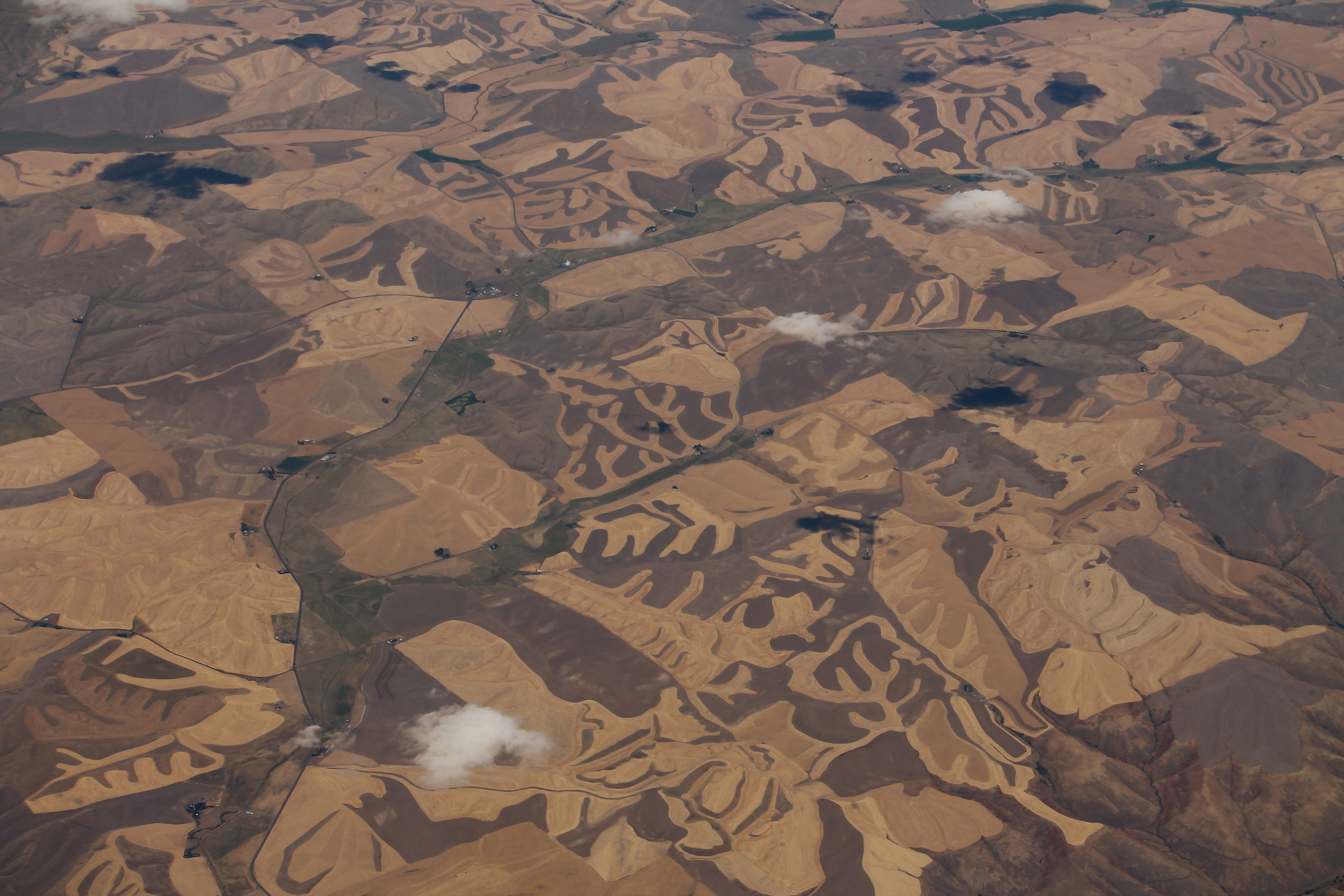
An aerial view of Dusty, Washington, where SR 26 and SR 127 converge

SR 26 begins at an interchange with I-90 on the east end of the Vantage Bridge on the Columbia River, opposite the town of Vantage and the Ginkgo/Wanapum State Park. The highway travels south for one mile (1.6 km) to the mouth of the Sand Hollow, where it intersects SR 243, which continues downriver to Mattawa and the Vernita Bridge. SR 26 turns southeast and travels up the barren Sand Hollow to the Royal Slope and its irrigated fields, situated between the Frenchman Hills to the north and the Saddle Mountains to the south. The highway continues east across the plateau's farms and turns southeast at Royal City, near which it intersects SR 262. SR 26 crosses into the Columbia National Wildlife Refuge in the foothills of the Saddle Mountains and enters Adams County near Tauhton.

The highway follows a section of the Royal Slope Railroad, operated by the Port of Royal Slope and connecting to the Columbia Basin Railroad, into Othello. SR 26 crosses over SR 24, which it intersects via two side streets, and continues along the southern outskirts of the city to an interchange with SR 17. From Othello, the highway runs east across the rural Paradise Flats, home to Othello Municipal Airport and a field research outpost for the Washington State University's Irrigated Agricultural Research and Extension Center. SR 26 then descends into the Hatton Coulee, where it reaches a rest area and an interchange with US 395, a freeway that connects to the Tri-Cities. The highway continues east across the Rattlesnake Flat, where it intersects SR 21, and descends into Washtucna Coulee. SR 26 reaches the town of Washtucna, where it intersects the concurrent SR 260 and SR 261, which continue south to Kahlotus and north to Ritzville, respectively. East of Washtucna, the highway intersects the historic Mullan Road.

SR 26 follows the Columbia Plateau Trail and the Palouse River through the rough terrain of the Palouse. It crosses into Whitman County east of Hooper, where the state-owned Palouse River and Coulee City Railroad splits from the Union Pacific Railroad. The highway continues to follow the railroad, now traveling along Willow Creek, and passes the town of La Crosse and its municipal airport. SR 26 crosses several miles of farms in the rolling Palouse hills before reaching Dusty and an intersection with SR 127, which connects with US 12 on the south side of the Snake River. After following Alkali Flat Creek for a short distance, the highway turns northeasterly and ascends a section of the Palouse. SR 26 passes the Port of Whitman Business Air Center Airport and Whitman County Fairgrounds before rejoining the railroad and Palouse River at the west end of Colfax. The highway crosses the river and travels through an industrial area before terminating at an intersection with US 195 on the north side of downtown Colfax. A short spur route connects to southbound US 195 by crossing over a section of the Palouse River. The section between Hooper and Colfax is defined as part of the Palouse Scenic Byway, which encompasses a number of state highways in the Palouse region.

SR 26 is maintained by the Washington State Department of Transportation (WSDOT), which conducts an annual survey on the state's highways to measure traffic volume in terms of annual average daily traffic. Average daily traffic volumes on the highway in 2016 ranged from a minimum of 1,200 vehicles on the section between SR 21 and Wastucna to a maximum of 7,000 vehicles west of Othello. The entire route of SR 26 and its spur route are designated as part of the National Highway System, a network of roads identified as important to the national economy, defense, and mobility. SR 26 is also considered the main link between Western Washington and the Washington State University campus in Pullman and sees a noticeable spike in traffic during football games and school holidays. The highway is characterized as "dull and boring" by students, prompting towns along the route attempting to lure drivers with scenic guidebooks and posters.

== History ==
The shield of US 295.

The easternmost section of SR 26 roughly follows the Old Territorial Road, a military road constructed in the 1870s between Fort Walla Walla to Fort Colville, passing through the Palouse. The road was improved by county governments and incorporated into the Inland Empire Highway, part of the initial system of state-designated highways adopted in 1913. The highway was numbered as State Road 3 in 1923 and split between several highways under the federal government's system enacted in 1926, including US 295 between Dodge and Colfax.

The state legislature reformed the highway system in 1937, adopting a new numbering scheme consisting of primary and secondary routes, and took over maintenance of roads using gas tax revenues. The Inland Empire Highway became Primary State Highway 3 (PSH 3) and a county road from Connell to Washtucna and Dusty was designated as Secondary State Highway 11B (SSH 11B). The remainder of modern-day SR 26, from Vantage to Washtucna, was little more than a collection of unpaved local roads that ran further north along Crab Creek. SSH 7C was established by a legislative act in 1951, intending to replace existing county roads from a junction with PSH 7 (US 10) on the east side of the Vantage Bridge to PSH 11 (US 395) near Othello. The highway was then extended east to Washtucna in 1957 and supplemented with a branch route connecting to the Vernita ferry on SSH 11A. The Othello–Washtucna highway and a series of connecting farm-to-market roads were built from 1957 to 1965 by the state highway department, bypassing existing county roads. The Vantage–Othello highway was completed concurrently in the early 1950s.

SR 26 was established during the 1964 state highway renumbering, which instituted a system of sign routes (now state routes) to replace the earlier system of primary and secondary highways. SR 26 was created as a new east–west trunk highway and replaced all of SSH 7C and the eastern half of SSH 11B, terminating in the west near Vantage and in the east at Dodge. US 295 was decommissioned from the national highway system in 1967 and wholly replaced by SR 127. SR 127 was truncated to its present terminus at Dusty in 1979, allowing SR 26 to be extended east to Colfax.

A couple of recent and current construction projects are occurring along SR 26. One of which, involves illuminating the highway's intersection with B SE, which was finished in 2008, and Reynolds Road, to be done in 2009, west and east of Othello, respectively. Another project added a left turn lane at a dangerous intersection between SR 26 and South Thacker Road west of Othello. The most major of the recent projects include the addition and demolition of ramps at the I-90 interchange. Another minor project, a bridge fixing project, was completed in 2007, located northeast of Dusty and southwest of Colfax.

Collisions on the highway, blamed partly on Washington State University traffic, have prompted new initiatives to improve its safety. New passing lanes are scheduled to be constructed by 2025 as part of the statewide transportation package passed in 2015, but fatal collisions in the 2010s led to petitioning from students and families for accelerated safety projects.

== Spur route ==
State Route 26 Spur
- Location: Colfax
- Length: 0.07 mi (110 m)
- Existed: 1979–present

SR 26 has a short spur route in Colfax that runs for 0.07 miles (0.11 km), connecting the highway to the southbound lanes of US 195. The two-lane road crosses the Palouse River and merges with US 195 in an uncontrolled Y intersection at the north end of downtown Colfax. In its annual traffic counts, WSDOT measured a daily average of 3,200 vehicles using the spur route.

== Major intersections ==
County	Location	mi	km	Destinations	Notes
Grant		0.00	0.00	I-90 – Spokane, Seattle	Interchange
Grant		1.02	1.64	SR 243 south to SR 24 – Yakima, Richland	
Grant		25.32	40.75	SR 262 east / Road A Southeast – Potholes State Park	
Adams	Othello	40.58	65.31	SR 24 west (via South 1st Avenue) – Yakima, Othello	
Adams		42.58	68.53	SR 17 – Moses Lake, Pasco	Interchange
Adams		60.96	98.11	US 395 – Ritzville, Spokane, Pasco	Interchange
Adams		70.67	113.73	SR 21 – Lind, Kahlotus	
Adams	Washtucna	83.07	133.69	SR 260 west / SR 261 – Ritzville, Kahlotus	
Whitman	Dusty	117.00	188.29	SR 127 south to US 12 – Walla Walla	
Whitman	Colfax	133.52	214.88	SR 26 Spur south to US 195 – Colfax, Pullman	
Whitman	Colfax	133.61	215.02	US 195 north – Spokane	
1.000 mi = 1.609 km; 1.000 km = 0.621 mi
