= Washington State Route 261 =

State highway in Washington, US

State Route 261

- SR 261 highlighted in red

Route information
- Auxiliary route of SR 26
- Maintained by WSDOT
- Length: 62.71 mi (100.92 km)
- Existed: 1964–present

Major junctions
- South end: US 12 near Starbuck
- SR 260 near Kahlotus; SR 26 / SR 260 in Washtucna
- North end: I-90 / US 395 in Ritzville

Location
- Country: United States
- State: Washington
- Counties: Columbia, Franklin, Adams

Highway system
- State highways in Washington; Interstate; US; State; Scenic; Pre-1964; 1964 renumbering; Former
← SR 260	→ SR 262

State Route 261 (SR 261) is a 62.71-mile-long (100.92 km) state highway in the U.S. state of Washington. Serving Columbia, Franklin, and Adams counties, the highway begins at U.S. Route 12 (US 12) east of Starbuck and becomes concurrent with SR 260 from Kahlotus to SR 26 in Washtucna before ending at Interstate 90 (I-90) and US 395 in Ritzville. The highway has been legislated since 1937 from Ritzville to Washtucna as Secondary State Highway 11E (SSH 11E) and in 1957 from Washtucna to the Starbuck area as a branch of SSH 11B. The two secondary highways became SR 261 during the 1964 highway renumbering, and a gap between Washtucna and Starbuck was not paved until the construction of the Snake River Bridge was completed in 1968.

== Route description ==
SR 261 begins its 62.71-mile-long (100.92 km) route at an intersection with US 12 east of the town of Starbuck in rural Columbia County. The roadway travels north over the Pataha Creek and turns west, paralleling the Tucannon River through Starbuck and to the south bank of the Snake River. The highway passes over a rail bridge owned by the Washington State Department of Transportation before turning northwest and crossing the steel cantilever Snake River Bridge, listed on the National Register of Historic Places, into Franklin County near Lyons Ferry Park. At the north end of the bridge, SR 261 continues northwest, passing under a Union Pacific Railroad bridge and near Palouse Falls State Park, before crossing the Columbia Plateau Trail and intersecting SR 260 northeast of Kahlotus. A concurrency with SR 260 travels northeast into Adams County parallel to the Columbia Plateau Trail in the Palouse before entering Washtucna and being designated as Main Street. Main Street intersects SR 26, forming the eastern terminus of SR 260, after the Columbia Plateau Trail turns east. SR 261 continues north into farmland and crosses the John Wayne Pioneer Trail in Ralston before its northern terminus at a diamond interchange with I-90 and US 395 southeast of Ritzville, becoming Division Street as it serves the city.

Every year, the Washington State Department of Transportation (WSDOT) conducts a series of surveys on its highways in the state to measure traffic volume. This is expressed in terms of annual average daily traffic (AADT), which is a measure of traffic volume for any average day of the year. In 2011, WSDOT calculated that between 300 and 3,000 vehicles per day used the highway, mostly between Washtucna and Ritzville.

== History ==
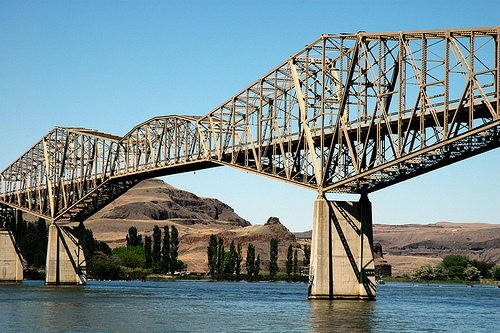
The Snake River Bridge at Lyons Ferry, built in 1968, carries SR 261 across the Snake River.

The Mullan Road was constructed in 1862 and crossed the Snake River with a ferry crossing at Lyons Ferry until the construction of the Lower Monumental Dam downstream caused the water level to rise and longer wait times, resulting in the reconstruction of the Snake River Bridge. The current route of SR 261 from Washtucna to Ritzville was designated during the creation of the Primary and secondary state highways in 1937 as SSH 11E. A branch of SSH 11B was added in 1957 that extended from Washtunca to US 410, later an extension of US 12, east of Starbuck with an un-built bridge over the Snake River at Lyons Ferry. Both highways became SR 261 during the 1964 highway renumbering, but the section between Starbuck and Washtucna was not paved. The completion of the Snake River Bridge in 1968, using the dismantled steel cantilevered Vantage Bridge and listed onto the National Register of Historic Places in 1982, finished the highway.

== Major intersections ==
County	Location	mi	km	Destinations	Notes
Columbia		0.00	0.00	US 12 – Walla Walla, Lewiston	Southern terminus
Snake River		14.78– 15.18	23.79– 24.43	Snake River Bridge	
Franklin		29.35	47.23	SR 260 west – Kahlotus, Washtucna	South end of SR 260 overlap
Adams	Washtucna	35.79	57.60	SR 26 / SR 260 ends – Othello, Colfax	North end of SR 260 overlap
Adams	Ritzville	62.57– 62.71	100.70– 100.92	I-90 / US 395 – Spokane, Seattle, Pasco, Tri-Cities	Northern terminus; interchange; continues as Division Street
1.000 mi = 1.609 km; 1.000 km = 0.621 mi: Concurrency terminus
