= Washington State Route 260 =

State highway in Washington, United States

State Route 260

- SR 260 highlighted in red

Route information
- Auxiliary route of SR 26
- Maintained by WSDOT
- Length: 37.98 mi (61.12 km)
- Existed: 1964–present

Major junctions
- West end: SR 17 near Connell
- US 395 in Connell; SR 21 in Kahlotus; SR 263 in Kahlotus
- East end: SR 26 / SR 261 in Washtucna

Location
- Country: United States
- State: Washington
- Counties: Franklin, Adams

Highway system
- State highways in Washington; Interstate; US; State; Scenic; Pre-1964; 1964 renumbering; Former
← SR 243	→ SR 261

State Route 260 (SR 260) is a 37.98-mile-long (61.12 km) state highway serving Franklin and Adams counties in the U.S. state of Washington. The highway begins at SR 17 west of Connell, and travels through the Washtucna Coulee to Kahlotus, forming the southern terminus of SR 21 and the northern terminus of SR 263, before a concurrency with SR 261 to SR 26 in Washtucna.

SR 260 had previously existed as a gravel road between Connell and Kahlotus in 1916 and was designated as Secondary State Highway 11A (SSH 11A) from Yakima to Connell and Secondary State Highway 11B (SSH 11B) from Connell to Washtucna in 1937. SSH 11A in the Connell area became an extension of SSH 11B in 1957, which in turn became SR 260 in the 1964 highway renumbering.

== Route description ==
SR 260 begins at an intersection with SR 17 west of Connell in rural Franklin County. The highway travels east and turns southeast into Connell, traveling over a rail line owned by BNSF Railway and used on the Amtrak Empire Builder route between Pasco and Spokane. After intersecting U.S. Route 395 (US 395) in the busiest section of the entire route, a diamond interchange that received a daily average of 2,800 vehicles in 2011, the roadway continues east through the Washtucna Coulee and passes south of Sulphur Lake before entering Kahlotus. As SR 260 passes through Kahlotus, it forms the southern terminus of SR 21, going north towards Lind, and the northern terminus of SR 263, serving the Lower Monumental Dam. The road exits the city travelling east to Lake Kahlotus and Washtucna Lake, paralleling the Columbia Plateau Trail northeast to the beginning of a concurrency with SR 261. The two highways enter the Adams County city of Washtucna and become Main Street before an intersection with SR 26, where SR 260 ends and SR 261 continues to Ritzville.

== History ==
The current route of State Route 260 (SR 260) first appears in a 1916 map as a road between Connell and Kahlotus. The highway was designated as part of Secondary State Highway 11A (SSH 11A) from Yakima to Connell and Secondary State Highway 11B (SSH 11B) from Connell to Washtucna in 1937, during the creation of the Primary and secondary state highway system. SSH 11A was re-aligned in 1957 and the route in the vicinity of Connell became part of SSH 11B. During the 1964 highway renumbering, SSH 11B became SR 260, being unpaved from newly created SR 17 to a short concurrency with U.S. Route 395 (US 395)

By 1981, the entire route was paved and the concurrency with US 395 was removed and replaced by an intersection with a bypass of Connell. No major revisions to the route of SR 260 have occurred since the 1980s. The western section of the highway between SR 17 and Connell was considered for removal by a legislative committee in 1986.

== Major intersections ==
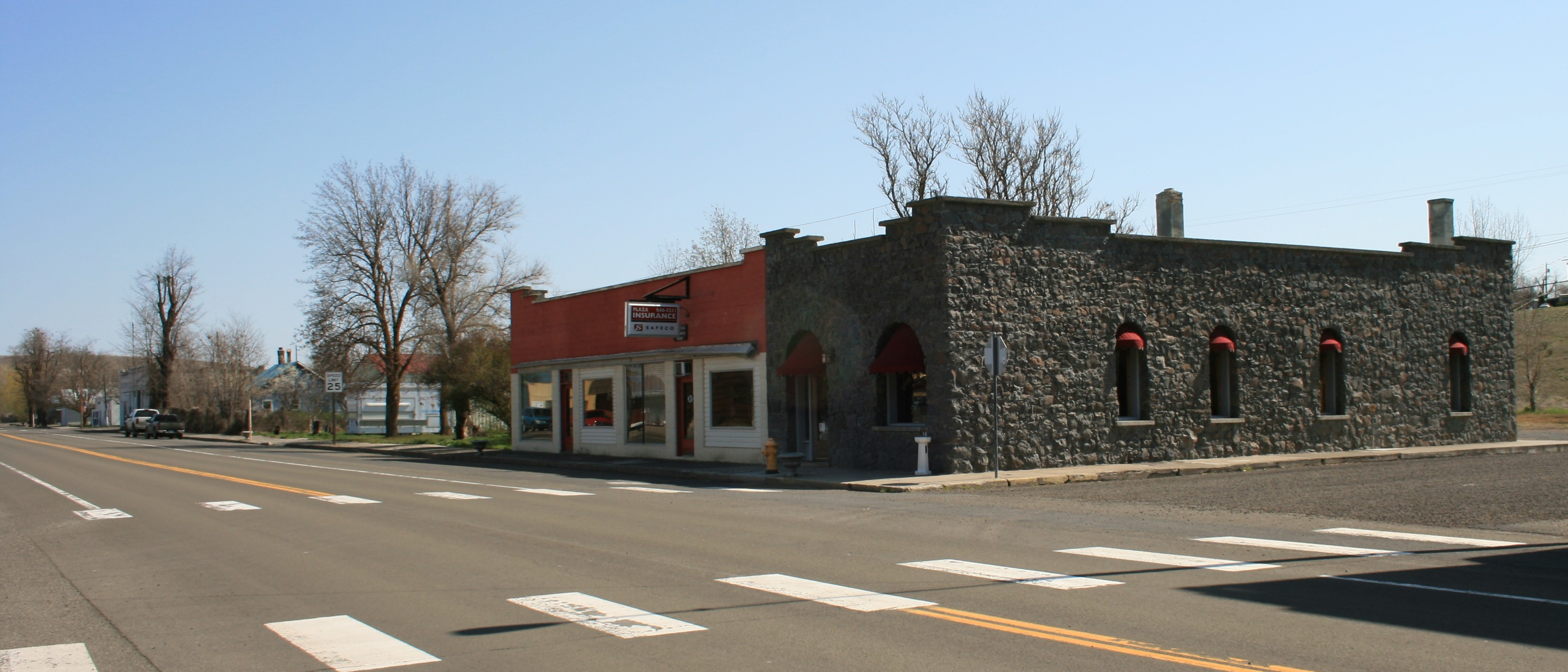
SR 260 and SR 261 passing through Washtucna as Main Street before the eastern terminus of SR 260 at SR 26.

County	Location	mi	km	Destinations	Notes
Franklin		0.00	0.00	SR 17 – Pasco, Moses Lake	Western terminus
Franklin	Connell	7.43– 7.63	11.96– 12.28	US 395 – Spokane, Pasco	Interchange
Franklin	Kahlotus	23.21	37.35	SR 21 north (Violet Avenue) – Lind, Odessa	Southern terminus of SR 21
Franklin	Kahlotus	23.49	37.80	SR 263 south (Spokane Avenue) – Windust, Lower Monumental Dam	Northern terminus of SR 263
Franklin		31.54	50.76	SR 261 south to US 12 – Starbuck	West end of SR 261 overlap
Adams	Washtucna	37.98	61.12	SR 26 – Othello, Colfax	Eastern terminus; east end of SR 261 overlap
1.000 mi = 1.609 km; 1.000 km = 0.621 mi: Concurrency terminus
