= Hooper, Washington =

Unincorporated community in Washington, United States

Hooper
- Unincorporated community
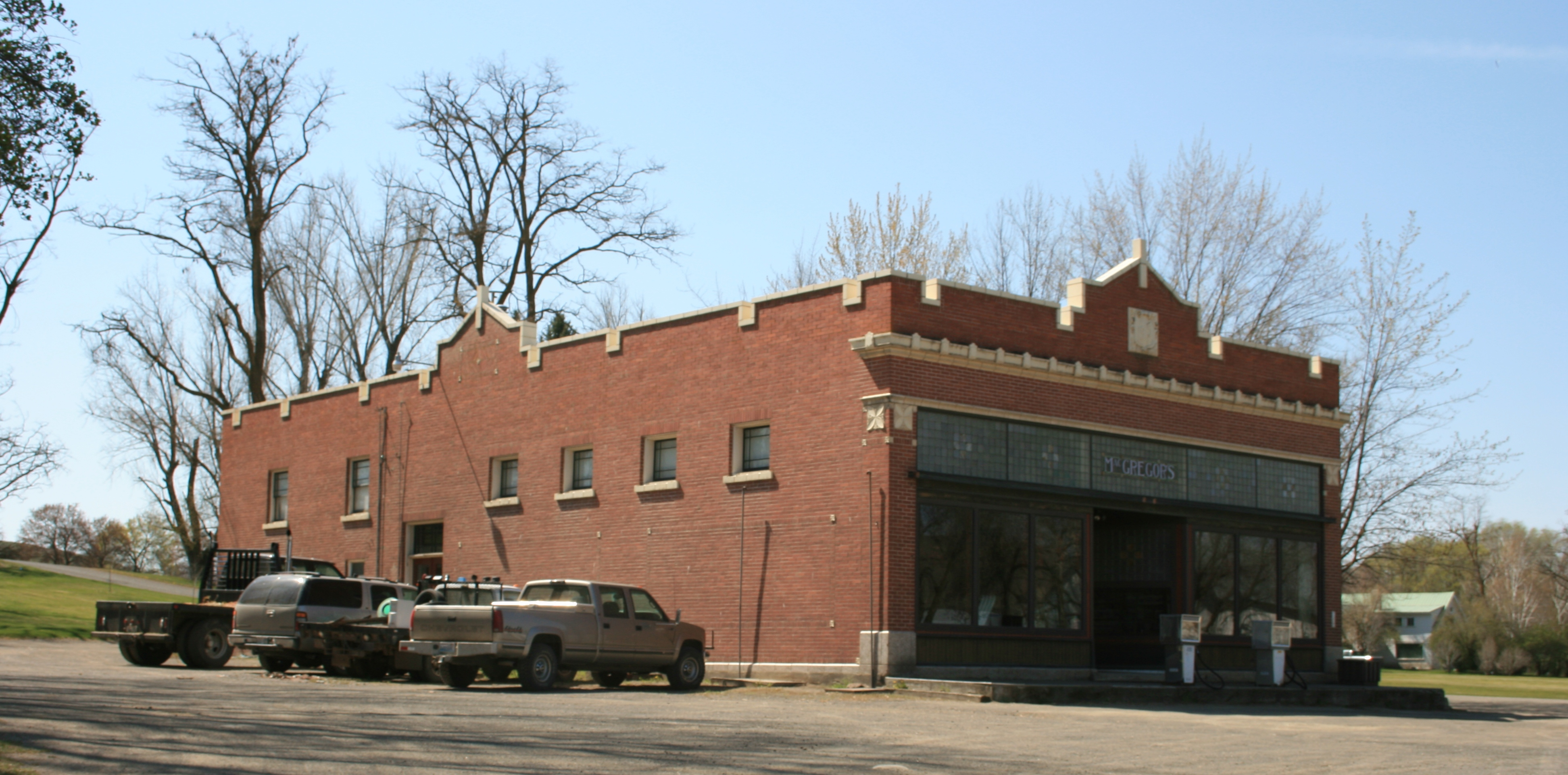
- Hooper in 2008

- Location within the state of Washington
- Coordinates: 46°45′25″N 118°09′00″W
- Country: United States
- State: Washington
- County: Whitman
- Elevation: 1,122 ft (342 m)
- Time zone: UTC-8 (Pacific (PST))
  - Summer (DST): UTC-7 (PDT)
- ZIP codes: 99333
- GNIS feature ID: 1505595

Hooper is an unincorporated community in Whitman County, Washington, United States.

== History ==
The community was named around 1883 for early settler Albert J. Hooper. As of 2007, the population of Hooper was about 21.

== Geography ==
The community is located in the Palouse Region, which is known for its rolling hills and wheat production.

Hooper is located along the southern bank of the Palouse River, which serves as the boundary between Whitman County and Adams County. An old route of Washington State Route 26 crosses the river at Hooper, though the current alignment of the route is north of the river about a mile from Hooper. The Columbia Plateau Trail also passes within a mile of Hooper on the opposite side of the river.
