= Turnbull National Wildlife Refuge =

Protected area in Washington state, US

- IUCN category IV (habitat/species management area)
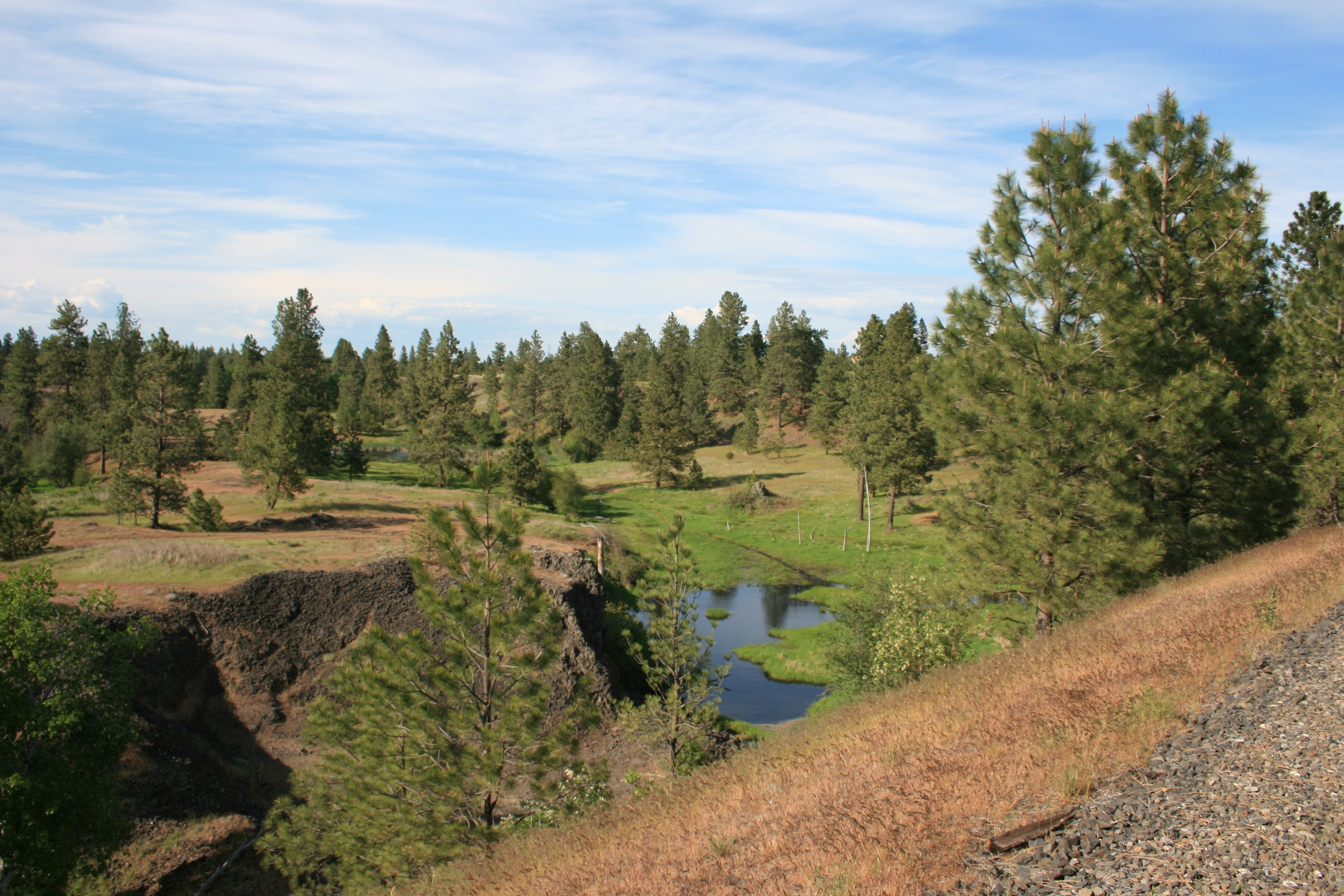

- Location within Washington (state)
- Location: Spokane County, Washington
- Nearest city: Cheney, Washington
- Coordinates: 47°25′26″N 117°34′33″W
- Area: 18,684.98 acres (7,561.54 ha)
- Established: 1937
- Governing body: United States Fish and Wildlife Service
- Website: Turnbull National Wildlife Refuge

The Turnbull National Wildlife Refuge is located six miles (10 km) south of Cheney, Washington, on the eastern edge of the Columbia Basin in Spokane County in northeastern Washington. Turnbull NWR encompasses more than 23,000 acres (9,300 ha) of the Channeled Scablands. The ecosystem that predominates the refuge is unique within the National Wildlife Refuge System and has characteristics that distinguish it from natural reserves worldwide. The combination of basalt outcrops, channeled canyons, and ponderosa pine forests infused in a diverse landscape of over 130 marshes, wetlands, and lakes creates an environment of aesthetic beauty as well as high quality wildlife habitat. The refuge is named for Cyrus Turnbull who lived on the site in the 1880s.

== Geology ==
The refuge is situated within the Channeled Scablands, an area formed 16,000 years ago by Missoula Floods during the last ice age. The powerful forces of volcanism, glaciation, and the largest flood in geological history have combined to forge a distinct environment. Refuge ecosystems represent an ecological transition between the dry, sagebrush-dotted grasslands of the Columbia Basin up toward the timbered Selkirk and Bitterroot mountain ranges that rise up to the east. The 3,036 acres (1,229 ha) of wetlands on Turnbull NWR represent some of the last quality breeding habitat available in eastern Washington for waterfowl, which have experienced tremendous population declines across North America due to loss and degradation of breeding, migration and wintering habitat. The powerful forces of the volcanism which formed the Columbia Plateau, glaciation, and a series of large floods combined to form an environment unique in many respects. The area provides a high quality wildlife habitat that combines scablands, basalt outcrops, channeled canyons, ponderosa pine forests, and meadows in a diverse landscape with over 130 marshes, wetlands and lakes.

== Wildlife and habitat ==
The refuge was established in 1937 by an Executive Order of President Franklin D. Roosevelt to provide productive breeding and nesting grounds for migratory birds and other wildlife. The ecosystem that predominates the refuge is unique within the National Wildlife Refuge System and has characteristics that distinguish it from natural reserves worldwide. The 3,036 acres (12 km^{2}) of wetlands on Turnbull NWR represent some of the last quality breeding habitat available in eastern Washington for waterfowl, which have experienced tremendous population declines across North America due to loss and degradation of breeding, migration and wintering habitat. The ecological transition between the dry, sagebrush dotted grasslands of the Columbia Basin up toward the timbered Selkirk and Bitterroot Mountains provides excellent wildlife habitat.

== Access ==
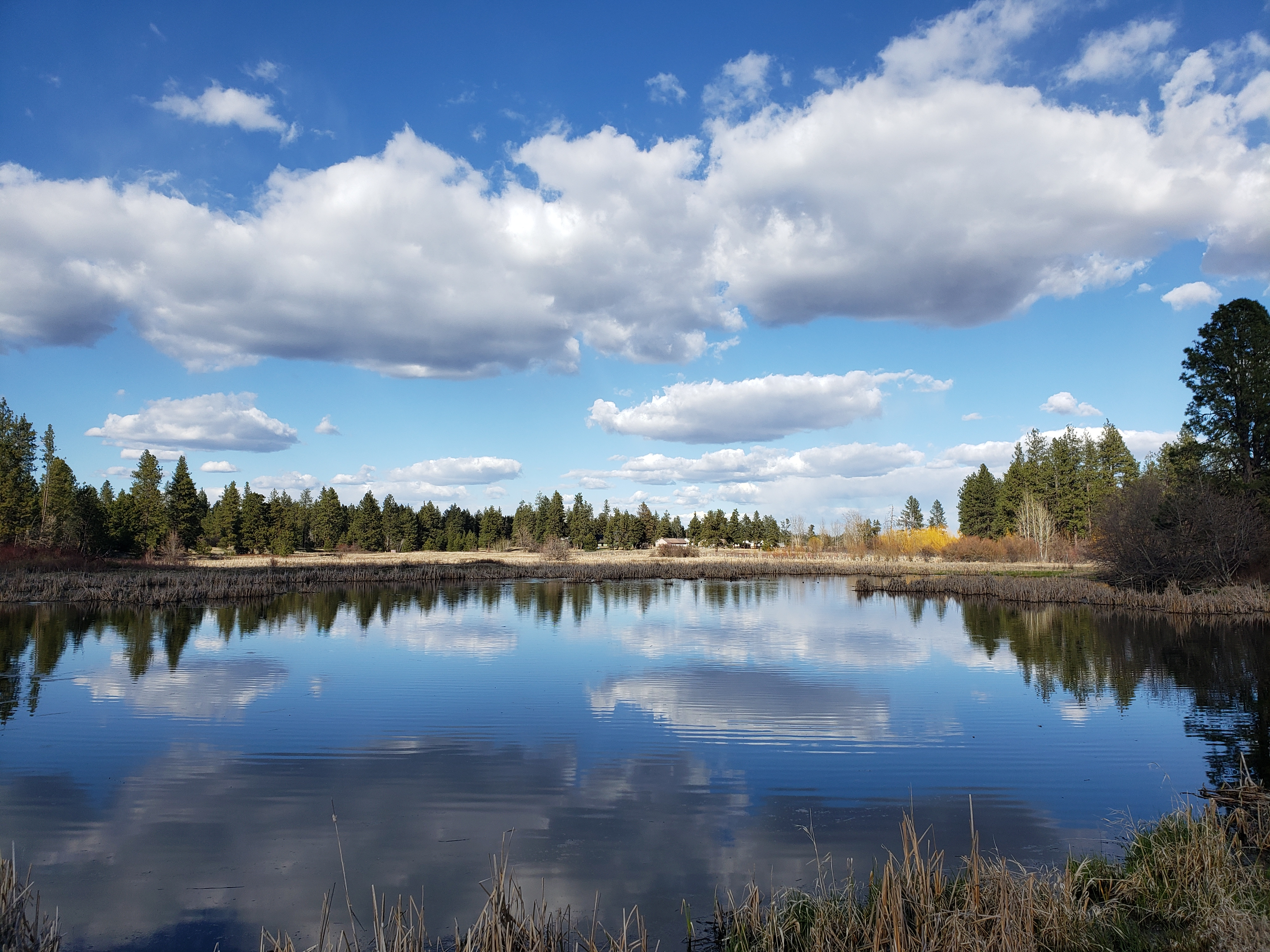
A view of Winslow Pool and the Turnbull NWR Visitor Center from the Pine Lake Loop Trail

The Columbia Plateau Trail provides access to the refuge. The Pine Lake Loop Trail, designated a National Recreation Trail in 2006, provides 1.25 miles (2.01 km) of wheelchair-accessible hiking along Winslow Pool and around Pine Lake.
