= Dusty, Washington =

Unincorporated community in Washington, US

- Unincorporated Community
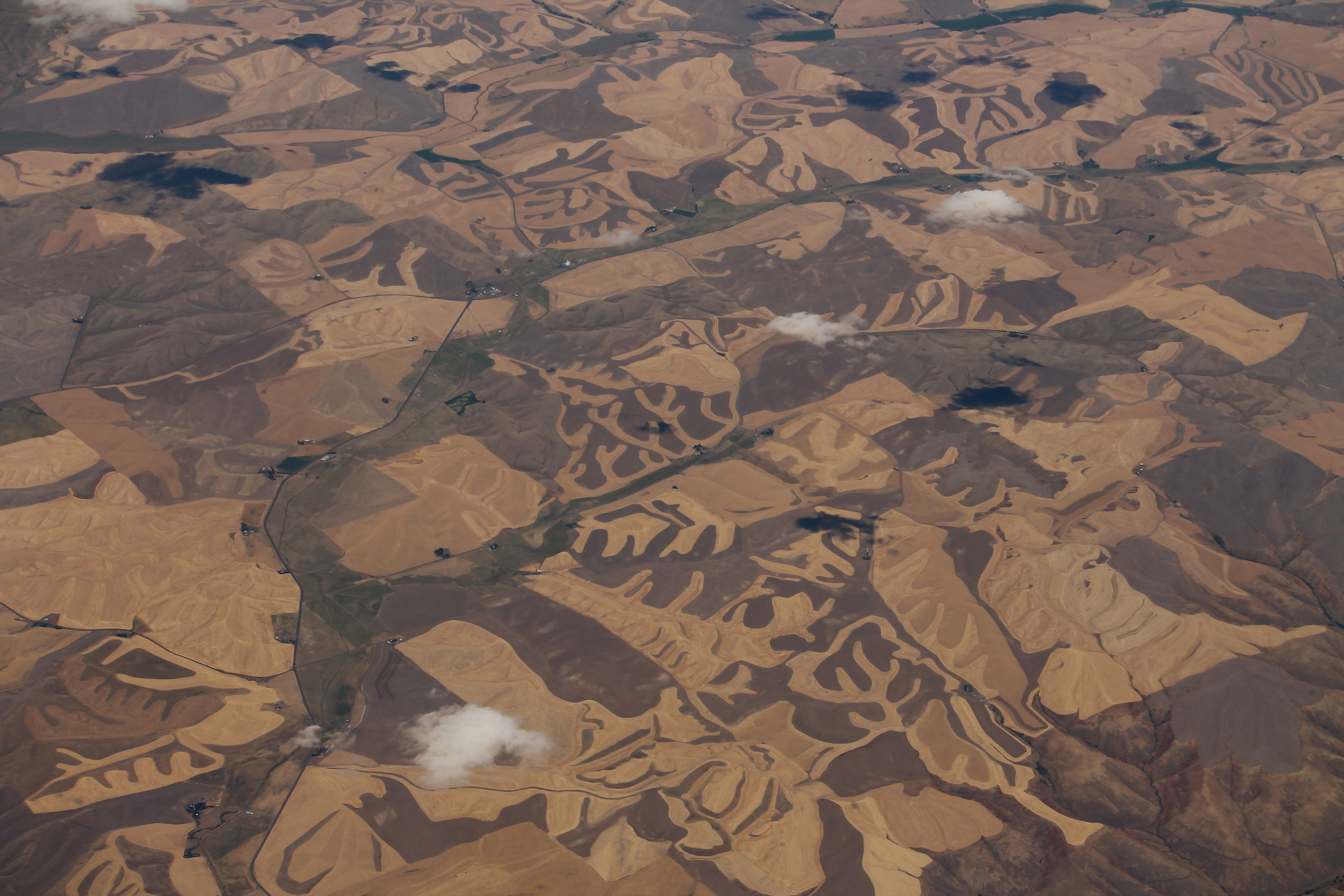
- Aerial view of Dusty
- Interactive map of Dusty, Washington
- Coordinates: 46°48′37″N 117°39′07″W
- Country: United States
- State: Washington
- County: Whitman
- Time zone: UTC-8 (PST)
  - Summer (DST): UTC-7 (PDT)
- Zip Code: 99143
- Area code: 509

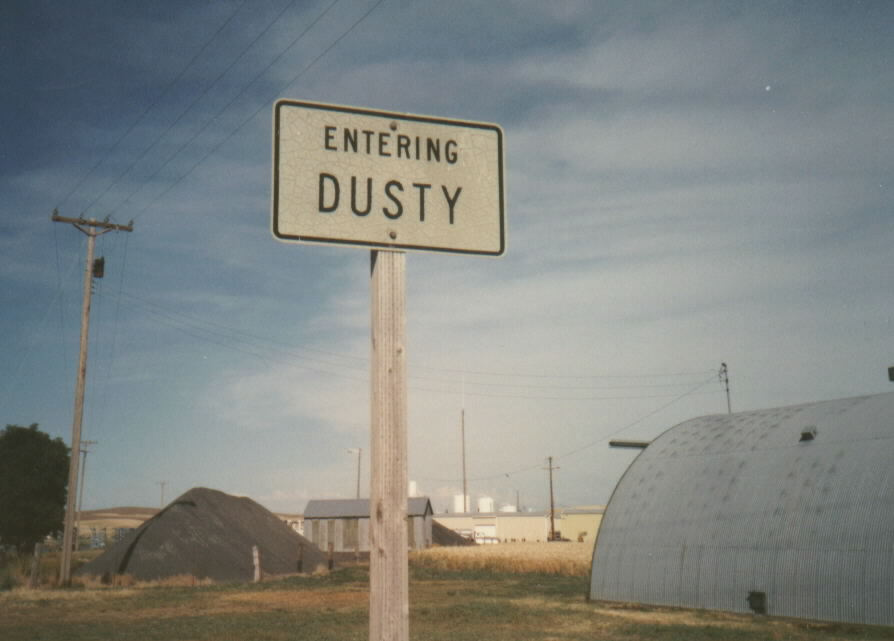
Entering Dusty Sign

Dusty is an unincorporated community in Whitman County, Washington, United States. It lies at the junction of Washington State Route 26 and Washington State Route 127.

== Geography ==
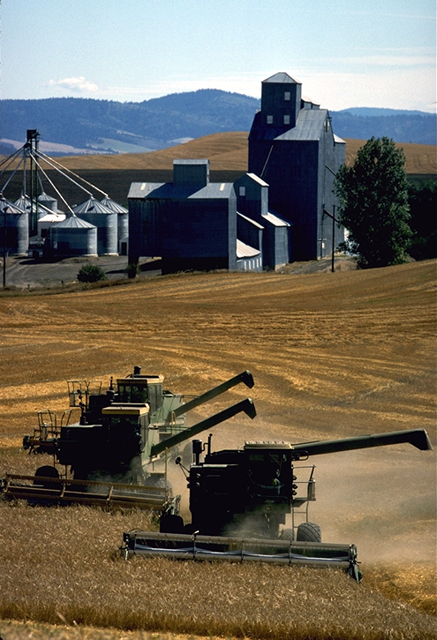
Whitman County, Washington near Dusty

The community is located in the Palouse Region, which is known for its rolling hills and agricultural production. Various reports put the population of this tiny hamlet at either 11 or 12 people.

== History ==
The town was never incorporated, and no post office was ever operated there. The Ackerman Graveyard was dedicated in May 1901. By 1915 the community was still largely agricultural, and a general store was operated by Adolph Stolz, a German immigrant. By 1949, there was a service station and the Dusty branch of the Whitman County Rural Library District. Today, little remains of the town beyond a handful of houses and a few agricultural buildings.

== Notable residents ==
Dusty is home of Wylie Gustafson, leader of the musical group Wylie & The Wild West. Coming from an extremely small community, this group has performed at the National Cowboy Poetry Gathering, The National Folk Festival, Kennedy Center, Lincoln Center, on A Prairie Home Companion, at the National Lentil Festival and on Grand Ole Opry.
