= Kahlotus, Washington =

- City
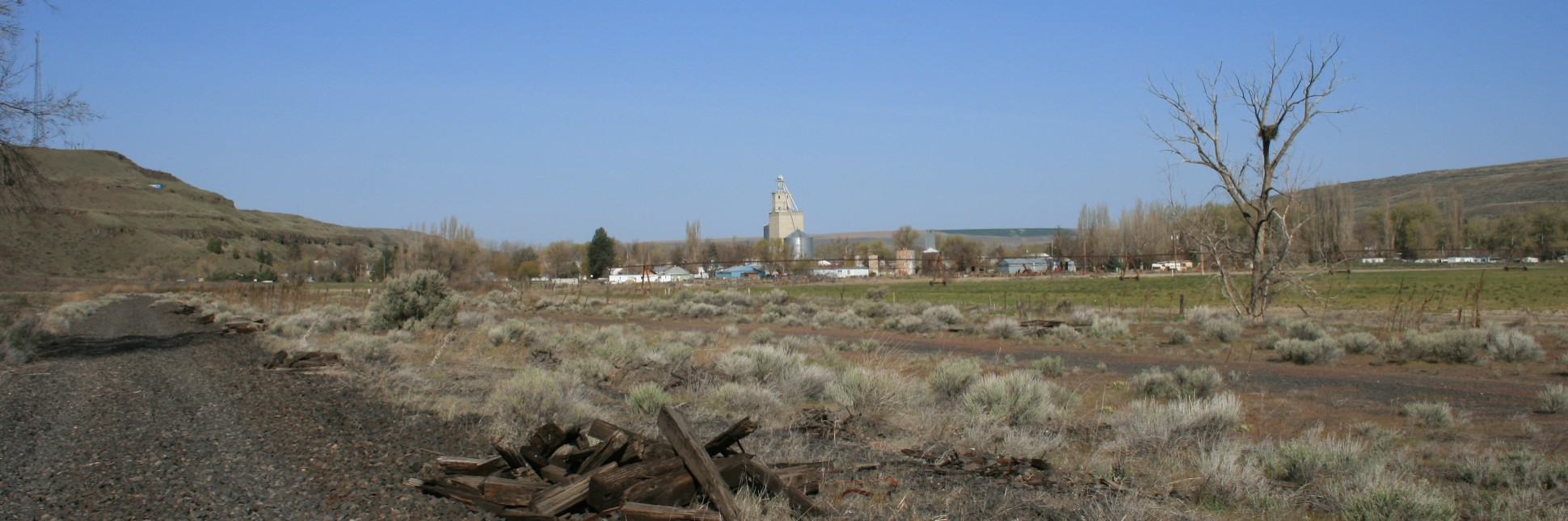
- Kahlotus as seen from the Columbia Plateau Trail.
- Nicknames: Hole in The Ground, K-Town
- Location of Kahlotus, Washington
- Coordinates: 46°38′36″N 118°33′22″W
- Country: United States
- State: Washington
- County: Franklin
- Founded: 1890's
- Incorporated: May 31, 1907

Government
  - Type: Mayor–council
  - Mayor: Michael Robitaille

Area
  - Total: 0.38 sq mi (0.98 km^{2})
  - Land: 0.38 sq mi (0.98 km^{2})
  - Water: 0 sq mi (0.00 km^{2})
- Elevation: 906 ft (276 m)

Population (2020)
  - Total: 147
  - Estimate (2023): 138
  - Density: 374/sq mi (144.4/km^{2})
- Time zone: UTC–8 (Pacific (PST))
  - Summer (DST): UTC–7 (PDT)
- ZIP Code: 99335
- Area code: 509
- FIPS code: 53-34575
- GNIS feature ID: 2410159
- Sales tax: 8.1%

Kahlotus (/kəˈloʊtəs/) is a city in Franklin County, Washington, United States. The population was 147 at the 2020 census.

== Etymology ==
Originally named Hardersburg after Hans Harder who platted the town in 1902, the community was later renamed Kahlotus. The meaning of the word "Kahlotus" is uncertain. According to toponymist William Bright, the name derives from the Sahaptin placename /kalúːt'as/. The name is also thought to translate from another Native American word meaning "Hole in the ground". A third possibility is that the town was named for a Palouse tribal chief and signer of the Yakima Treaty of 1855. His name appeared with various spellings, including Kohlotus, Quillatose (by future governor Isaac Stevens), Qalatos, and Kahlatoose.

== History ==
The first organized settlement of Kahlotus was by German immigrants, imported by the railroads, in around 1880. Harder's platting of the town coincided with the reinstatement of service on the Oregon & Washington Railroad & Navigation line between LaCrosse and Palouse Junction (now Connell), crossing the north end of town parallel to present-day Highway 260. Soon after, the Spokane, Portland and Seattle Railway began construction on a second railroad on the south shore of nearby Kahlotus Lake, including tunnels through the basalt cliffs near the southeast corner of town.

Kahlotus was officially incorporated on May 31, 1907. The town boomed during construction of the railroad, local legend claims that nearly 20 saloons, a bank, newspaper, brothels, and other businesses appeared to serve the rail crews.

Dryland farming has historically constituted the majority of the local economy. Relatively little irrigated agriculture occurs in the area, supported by local wells. The Columbia Basin Irrigation Project does not deliver water to Kahlotus.

In 1969, the initial phase of the Lower Monumental Dam was completed nearby, bringing more electricity and water for irrigation, but inundating the nearby Marmes Rockshelter. The dam also made the Snake River navigable, allowing grain to be barged downriver rather than being carried by train. Within a few years, the railroad through the north end of the valley was abandoned and removed. The Burlington Northern Railroad tracks along the south end of the lake bed and Devils Canyon were abandoned and removed in the late 1980s, and the right of way became part of the Columbia Plateau Trail State Park.

== Geography ==
Kahlotus lies on the floor of Washtucna Coulee at the junction of three state highways. State Route 21 has its southern terminus in Kahlotus, from which it runs north all the way to the Canadian border. State Route 260 passes through Kahlotus as it follows the path of the coulee from Connell in the west to Washtucna in the east. State Route 263 has its northern terminus in Kahlotus, from which it extends through the Devils Canyon to the Lower Monumental Dam on the Snake River six miles south of the city. The Columbia Plateau Trail passes through Kahlotus, entering the city from the east along Washtucna Coulee before turning south into the Devils Canyon.

Being located on the floor of a coulee puts Kahlotus at relatively lower elevation than the surrounding terrain. The steep walls of the coulee rise hundreds of feet dramatically to the north and south of the city center. According to the United States Census Bureau, the city has a total area of 0.38 square miles (0.98 km^{2}), all of it land.

=== Kahlotus Lake ===
Kahlotus Lake, near the east edge of town, was a highly alkaline, spring fed lake and was once a popular fishing spot full of bass and crappie. Several times in the early 20th century, the lake swelled with runoff and flooded the lower-lying portions of town. However, the lake shrank rapidly through the 1990s, and by 2000 only a small marshy area remained at the east end of the lake bed, far from town. Most likely, the lake disappeared due to a combination of several consecutive years of below average rainfall and increases in irrigation withdrawals within the valley.

=== Climate ===
According to the Köppen Climate Classification system, Kahlotus has a semi-arid climate, abbreviated "BSk" on climate maps.

== Demographics ==
Historical population
Census	Pop.	Note	%±
1910	132		—
1920	151		14.4%
1930	164		8.6%
1940	163		−0.6%
1950	151		−7.4%
1960	131		−13.2%
1970	308		135.1%
1980	203		−34.1%
1990	167		−17.7%
2000	214		28.1%
2010	193		−9.8%
2020	147		−23.8%
2023 (est.)	138		−6.1%
U.S. Decennial Census; 2020 Census

=== 2020 census ===
As of the 2020 census, Kahlotus had a population of 147. The median age was 44.1 years. 26.5% of residents were under the age of 18 and 23.8% of residents were 65 years of age or older. For every 100 females there were 96.0 males, and for every 100 females age 18 and over there were 100.0 males age 18 and over.

0.0% of residents lived in urban areas, while 100.0% lived in rural areas.

There were 59 households in Kahlotus, of which 39.0% had children under the age of 18 living in them. Of all households, 44.1% were married-couple households, 30.5% were households with a male householder and no spouse or partner present, and 22.0% were households with a female householder and no spouse or partner present. About 22.0% of all households were made up of individuals and 6.8% had someone living alone who was 65 years of age or older.

There were 70 housing units, of which 15.7% were vacant. The homeowner vacancy rate was 0.0% and the rental vacancy rate was 16.7%.

Racial composition as of the 2020 census
Race	Number	Percent
White	118	80.3%
Black or African American	0	0.0%
American Indian and Alaska Native	1	0.7%
Asian	1	0.7%
Native Hawaiian and Other Pacific Islander	0	0.0%
Some other race	12	8.2%
Two or more races	15	10.2%
Hispanic or Latino (of any race)	27	18.4%

=== 2010 census ===
As of the 2010 census, there were 193 people, 88 households, and 56 families residing in the city. The population density was 410.6 inhabitants per square mile (158.5/km^{2}). There were 114 housing units at an average density of 242.6 per square mile (93.7/km^{2}). The racial makeup of the city was 90.7% White, 0.5% African American, 0.5% Native American, 2.6% Asian, 3.6% from other races, and 2.1% from two or more races. Hispanic or Latino of any race were 8.3% of the population.

There were 88 households, of which 26.1% had children under the age of 18 living with them, 46.6% were married couples living together, 11.4% had a female householder with no husband present, 5.7% had a male householder with no wife present, and 36.4% were non-families. 33.0% of all households were made up of individuals, and 5.7% had someone living alone who was 65 years of age or older. The average household size was 2.19 and the average family size was 2.66.

The median age in the city was 47.8 years. 19.2% of residents were under the age of 18; 6.2% were between the ages of 18 and 24; 19.1% were from 25 to 44; 43% were from 45 to 64; and 12.4% were 65 years of age or older. The gender makeup of the city was 53.9% male and 46.1% female.

=== 2000 census ===
As of the 2000 census, there were 214 people, 89 households, and 51 families residing in the city. The population density was 523.2 people per square mile (201.5/km^{2}). There were 113 housing units at an average density of 276.3 per square mile (106.4/km^{2}). The racial makeup of the city was 85.05% White, 0.93% African American, 0.93% Native American, 0.47% Asian, 9.35% from other races, and 3.27% from two or more races. Hispanic or Latino of any race were 11.21% of the population.

There were 89 households, out of which 32.6% had children under the age of 18 living with them, 42.7% were married couples living together, 11.2% had a female householder with no husband present, and 41.6% were non-families. 36.0% of all households were made up of individuals, and 3.4% had someone living alone who was 65 years of age or older. The average household size was 2.40 and the average family size was 3.10.

In the city, the age distribution of the population shows 27.1% under the age of 18, 7.5% from 18 to 24, 28.0% from 25 to 44, 27.1% from 45 to 64, and 10.3% who were 65 years of age or older. The median age was 39 years. For every 100 females, there were 132.6 males. For every 100 females age 18 and over, there were 122.9 males.

The median income for a household in the city was $38,750, and the median income for a family was $38,958. Males had a median income of $31,786 versus $25,179 for females. The per capita income for the city was $16,617. About 11.6% of families and 19.3% of the population were below the poverty line, including 27.5% of those under the age of eighteen and none of those 65 or over.

== Economy ==
The residents of the Kahlotus area are involved in cattle and wheat farming, as well as work for various government agencies, including the Corps of Engineers at Lower Monumental Dam, Lyons Ferry Fish Hatchery, and Coyote Ridge Corrections Facility.

== Education ==
The Kahlotus School District serves the area and has never had a graduating class larger than 12 in its history (in 1988 and 1991). The first schoolhouse was built in 1916 and was a two-story school house that housed every class from 1916–1954. A new school building was completed in 1954. In existence as of 2014, renovations have been completed over the years with extensive upgrades in the 1990s and 2000s. The Senior Class of 2012 only had 2 students, while the Classes of 2013 and 2014 had 3 graduates.
