= Hatton, Washington =

Hatton
- Town
- Location of Hatton, Washington
- Coordinates: 46°46′25″N 118°49′40″W
- Country: United States
- State: Washington
- County: Adams

Government
  - Type: Mayor Council
  - Mayor: Rhea Isaac

Area
  - Total: 0.37 sq mi (0.96 km^{2})
  - Land: 0.37 sq mi (0.96 km^{2})
  - Water: 0 sq mi (0.00 km^{2})
- Elevation: 1,102 ft (336 m)

Population (2020)
  - Total: 79
  - Density: 210/sq mi (82/km^{2})
- Time zone: UTC-8 (Pacific (PST))
  - Summer (DST): UTC-7 (PDT)
- ZIP codes: 99344
- Area code: 509
- FIPS code: 53-30060
- GNIS feature ID: 2412736

Hatton is a small incorporated town in Adams County, Washington, United States. The population was 79 at the 2020 census.

== History ==
When the Northern Pacific Railway built its line through Adams County, they established a station where Hatton is and built a section and pump house. Prior to 1890, the station was named Twin Wells after the two wells that were drilled to water the railroad employees. In 1890, James Bronson established the first store and at the same time the post office was established with the name "Hatton". The name for the town was derived from the last names of the first postmistress, Belle Sutton, daughter of a local settler, and her new husband John Hackett, a Northern Pacific Railway agent from Twin Falls, Idaho. Bronson's store was purchased by Otis Algoe in 1897 who subsequently became postmaster.

Hatton finally began to grow after 1901 and was platted on April 30, 1901 by James Bronson. By that time the town had four large warehouses, five stores, two hotels, a bank and a school. A newspaper, The Hatton Hustler was established during that time. Hatton was officially incorporated on July 31, 1907.

== Geography ==
According to the United States Census Bureau, the town has a total area of 0.37 square miles (0.96 km^{2}), all of it land.

Hatton is located within the region of Washington known as the Channeled Scablands and is situated on the west slope of the Providence Coulee with the Paradise Flats to the west and the Michigan Prairie to the east. The coulee was utilized by the Northern Pacific Railway for the construction of their main line from Portland, Oregon to Spokane.

U.S. Route 395 passes just to the east of the town site, connecting the town with Interstate 90 at Ritzville in the northeast and Interstate 82 at the Tri-Cities to the southwest. The highway follows Hatton Coulee, which joins Providence Coulee immediately to the south of town. State Route 26 passes about a mile north of Hatton, connecting the town with Othello, Adams County's largest city, to the west.

At the junction of Route 395 and State Route 26, about two miles east of Hatton, is the Hatton Coulee rest area operated by the Washington State Department of Transportation. There are limited services available at the junction and rest area.

=== Climate ===
According to the Köppen Climate Classification system, Hatton has a semi-arid climate, abbreviated "BSk" on climate maps.

Climate data for Hatton
Month	Jan	Feb	Mar	Apr	May	Jun	Jul	Aug	Sep	Oct	Nov	Dec	Year
Record high °F (°C)	63 (17)	76 (24)	84 (29)	99 (37)	101 (38)	107 (42)	112 (44)	114 (46)	102 (39)	90 (32)	75 (24)	67 (19)	114 (46)
Mean daily maximum °F (°C)	35.6 (2.0)	43.3 (6.3)	54.4 (12.4)	64 (18)	73.1 (22.8)	80.9 (27.2)	90.4 (32.4)	88.5 (31.4)	78.3 (25.7)	64 (18)	46.9 (8.3)	37.3 (2.9)	63.1 (17.3)
Mean daily minimum °F (°C)	22.5 (−5.3)	27.4 (−2.6)	32 (0)	36.1 (2.3)	42.4 (5.8)	48.7 (9.3)	54.5 (12.5)	53.2 (11.8)	46.1 (7.8)	37.4 (3.0)	30.4 (−0.9)	25.2 (−3.8)	38 (3)
Record low °F (°C)	−28 (−33)	−30 (−34)	6 (−14)	11 (−12)	21 (−6)	28 (−2)	31 (−1)	31 (−1)	19 (−7)	4 (−16)	−12 (−24)	−29 (−34)	−30 (−34)
Average precipitation inches (mm)	1.12 (28)	0.92 (23)	0.89 (23)	0.76 (19)	0.8 (20)	0.72 (18)	0.26 (6.6)	0.34 (8.6)	0.47 (12)	0.86 (22)	1.35 (34)	1.36 (35)	9.84 (250)
Average snowfall inches (cm)	5.1 (13)	2.6 (6.6)	0.4 (1.0)	0.1 (0.25)	0 (0)	0 (0)	0 (0)	0 (0)	0 (0)	0 (0)	1.5 (3.8)	4.2 (11)	14 (36)
Average precipitation days	9	8	8	6	6	5	2	2	4	7	10	10	77

== Demographics ==
Historical population
Census	Pop.	Note	%±
1910	161		—
1920	87		−46.0%
1930	65		−25.3%
1940	43		−33.8%
1950	42		−2.3%
1960	65		54.8%
1970	60		−7.7%
1980	81		35.0%
1990	71		−12.3%
2000	98		38.0%
2010	101		3.1%
2020	79		−21.8%
U.S. Decennial Census

=== 2010 census ===
As of the 2010 census, there were 101 people, 34 households, and 24 families residing in the town. The population density was 273.0 inhabitants per square mile (105.4/km^{2}). There were 40 housing units at an average density of 108.1 per square mile (41.7/km^{2}). The racial makeup of the town was 51.5% White, 5.0% Native American, 35.6% from other races, and 7.9% from two or more races. Hispanic or Latino of any race were 49.5% of the population.

There were 34 households, of which 44.1% had children under the age of 18 living with them, 52.9% were married couples living together, 8.8% had a female householder with no husband present, 8.8% had a male householder with no wife present, and 29.4% were non-families. 11.8% of all households were made up of individuals, and 2.9% had someone living alone who was 65 years of age or older. The average household size was 2.97 and the average family size was 3.33.

The median age in the town was 40.5 years. 30.7% of residents were under the age of 18; 6.1% were between the ages of 18 and 24; 24.9% were from 25 to 44; 31.7% were from 45 to 64; and 6.9% were 65 years of age or older. The gender makeup of the town was 43.6% male and 56.4% female.

=== 2000 census ===
As of the 2000 census, there were 98 people, 32 households, and 24 families residing in the town. The population density was 262.7 people per square mile (102.3/km^{2}). There were 35 housing units at an average density of 93.8 per square mile (36.5/km^{2}). The racial makeup of the town was 79.59% White, 1.02% Native American, 16.33% from other races, and 3.06% from two or more races. Hispanic or Latino of any race were 16.33% of the population.

There were 32 households, out of which 43.8% had children under the age of 18 living with them, 65.6% were married couples living together, 3.1% had a female householder with no husband present, and 25.0% were non-families. 25.0% of all households were made up of individuals, and 9.4% had someone living alone who was 65 years of age or older. The average household size was 3.06 and the average family size was 3.58.

In the town, the age distribution of the population shows 33.7% under the age of 18, 12.2% from 18 to 24, 24.5% from 25 to 44, 20.4% from 45 to 64, and 9.2% who were 65 years of age or older. The median age was 32 years. For every 100 females, there were 104.2 males. For every 100 females age 18 and over, there were 109.7 males.

The median income for a household in the town was $29,375, and the median income for a family was $34,583. Males had a median income of $26,875 versus $22,083 for females. The per capita income for the town was $9,806. There were 11.1% of families and 21.2% of the population living below the poverty line, including 31.9% of under eighteens and none of those over 64.
