= Curlew Lake State Park =

State park in Washington State, United States

- Location within Washington (state) Location within the United States
- Interactive map of Curlew Lake State Park
- Location: Ferry County, Washington, United States
- Coordinates: 48°43′05″N 118°39′34″W
- Area: 87 acres (35 ha)
- Elevation: 2,402 ft (732 m)
- Established: 1958
- Administrator: Washington State Parks and Recreation Commission
- Website: Official website

Curlew Lake State Park is a public recreation area located on the eastern shore of Curlew Lake five miles (8.0 km) northeast of Republic in Ferry County, Washington. The state park's 87 acres (35 ha) include facilities for picnicking, camping, hiking, biking, boating, fishing, and swimming.

== History ==
The Washington Department of Game first developed the site for public fishing in 1948. In 1958, the Washington State Parks and Recreation Commission agreed to use the land for “state park and recreational area development.” The Washington legislature appropriated $25,000 for development of the park in 1959.
