= Washtucna, Washington =

Washtucna
- Town
- Washtucna, Washington
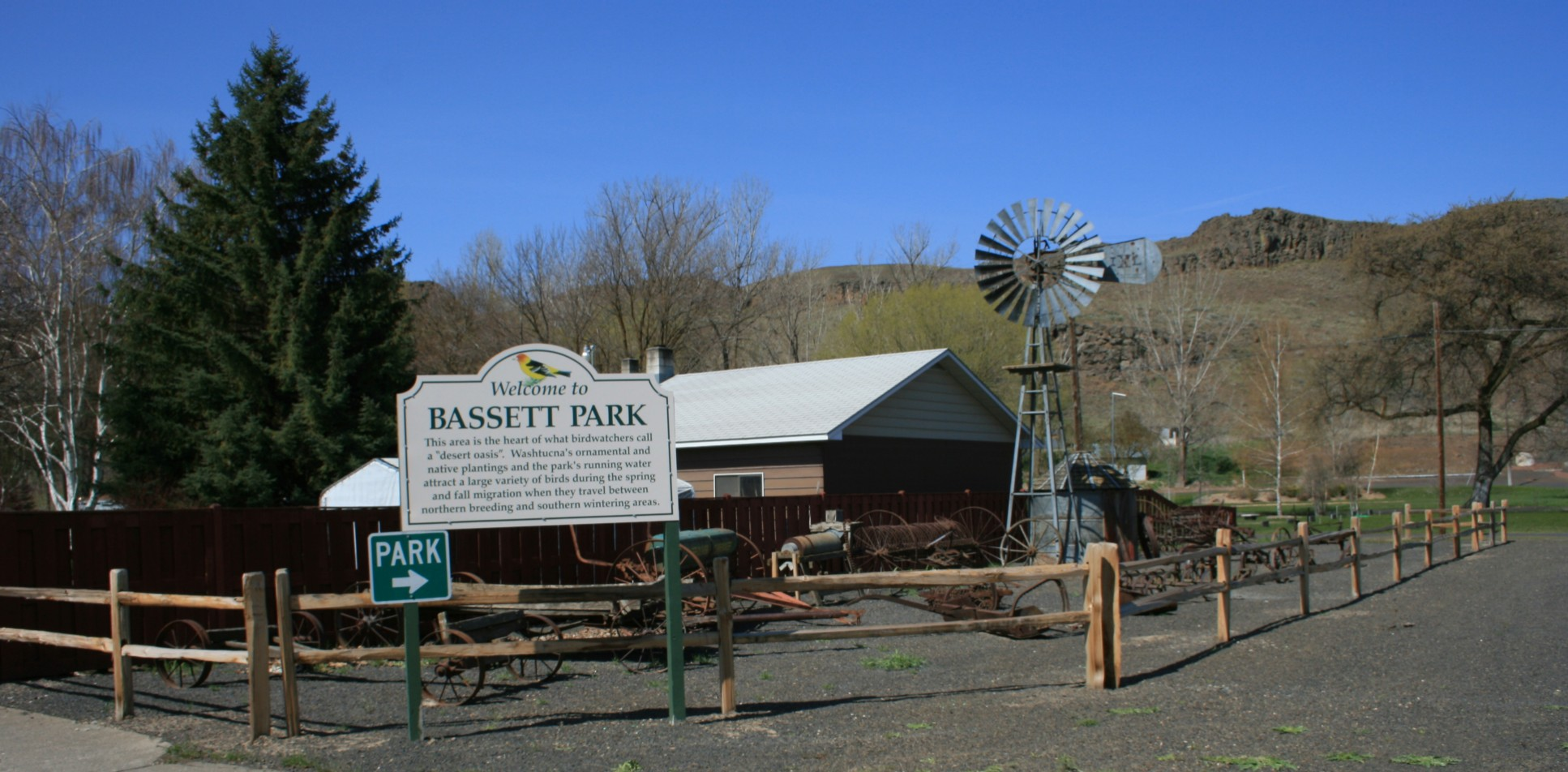
- Bassett Park in Washtucna

- Location of Washtucna, Washington
- Coordinates: 46°45′04″N 118°18′44″W
- Country: United States
- State: Washington
- County: Adams

Government
  - Type: Mayor–council
  - Mayor: Brett Guske

Area
  - Total: 0.66 sq mi (1.71 km^{2})
  - Land: 0.66 sq mi (1.71 km^{2})
  - Water: 0 sq mi (0.00 km^{2})
- Elevation: 1,024 ft (312 m)

Population (2020)
  - Total: 211
  - Density: 320/sq mi (123/km^{2})
- Time zone: UTC-8 (Pacific (PST))
  - Summer (DST): UTC-7 (PDT)
- ZIP code: 99371
- Area code: 509
- FIPS code: 53-76440
- GNIS feature ID: 2413453
- Website: washtucna.org

Washtucna (/wɑːʃˈtʌknə/) is a town in Adams County, Washington, United States. The population was 211 at the 2020 census, a 1% increase over the previous census. The town was named for a lake 12 miles from the town in Franklin County which was in turn named after a Palouse Native American chief.

== History ==
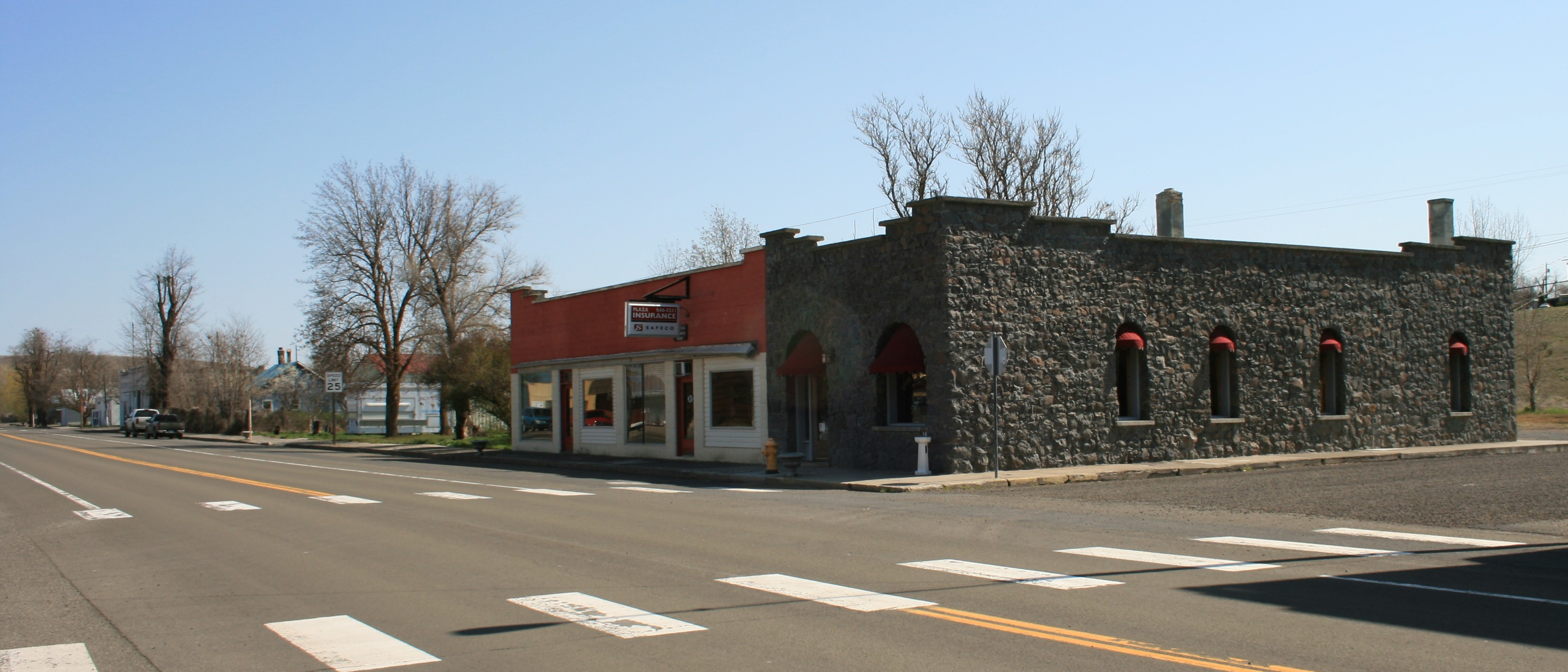
Main Street buildings.

George Bassett, an Iowan settler homesteaded the future site of Washtucna in 1878 with his wife Alice Lancaster Bassett. Their goal was to raise horses, and until 1900 their ranch was the site of an annual roundup of wild horses. In 1882, the first Post Office in Adams County was established with Bassett as postmaster. The post office was taken over by T.C. Martin in 1894 who then opened the first store in Washtucna. The town was named after a leader of the Palouse people who was purportedly called "Washtucna."

The first rail line into the area was completed by the Oregon Improvement Company in 1886, and shipped 30,000 bushels of wheat in its first five years. Several attempts at large-scale irrigation projects were attempted between 1892 and 1917, but all failed. Dry land wheat farming has persisted since that time.

Washtucna was officially incorporated on October 27, 1903, with Charles T. Booth as the first mayor.

During the early 2000s recession, Washtucna faced a potential budget shortfall due to reduced state subsidies and poor wheat sales.

== Geography ==
Washtucna sits at the head of Washtucna Coulee, a thin but deep valley that runs west to Connell, Washington where it merges with Providence Coulee to form Esquatzel Coulee. Being located on the floor of the coulee, Washtucna is at relatively lower elevation than the terrain that surrounds it. The floor of the coulee at Washtucna is roughly 1,027 feet above sea level, but the steep walls of the coulee quickly rise to 1,600 feet above sea level in places within a mile of the city center.

Washtucna is located at the intersection of State Routes 26 and 261; about 65 miles (105 km) west of Pullman, Washington, 86 miles (138 km) southwest of Spokane, Washington, and 220 miles (350 km) east of Seattle, Washington. The Columbia Plateau Trail passes through Washtucna as well.

The Palouse River currently passes within a couple of miles to the east of Washtucna, but in geological history the river previously flowed through Washtucna down Washtucna Coulee. The river eventually changed into its present-day course, abandoning the coulee. During the Missoula Floods, the former riverbed saw water once more as flood waters scoured their way through its channel. That history gives the Washtucna area features that are representative of both the Channeled Scablands region which extends to the north and west and the Palouse which extends to the south and east.

According to the United States Census Bureau, the town has a total area of 0.69 square miles (1.79 km^{2}), all of it land.

== Demographics ==
Historical population
Census	Pop.	Note	%±
1910	300		—
1920	359		19.7%
1930	261		−27.3%
1940	285		9.2%
1950	316		10.9%
1960	331		4.7%
1970	316		−4.5%
1980	266		−15.8%
1990	231		−13.2%
2000	260		12.6%
2010	208		−20.0%
2020	211		1.4%
U.S. Decennial Census

=== 2010 census ===
As of the 2010 census, there were 208 people, 97 households, and 62 families living in the town. The population density was 301.4 inhabitants per square mile (116.4/km^{2}). There were 126 housing units at an average density of 182.6 units per square mile (70.5 units/km^{2}). The racial makeup of the town was 95.2% White, 1.0% African American, 1.4% Native American, 1.4% from other races, and 1.0% from two or more races. Hispanic or Latino of any race were 2.4% of the population.

There were 97 households, of which 18.6% had children under the age of 18 living with them, 47.4% were married couples living together, 11.3% had a female householder with no husband present, 5.2% had a male householder with no wife present, and 36.1% were non-families. 30.9% of all households were made up of individuals, and 9.3% had someone living alone who was 65 years of age or older. The average household size was 2.14 and the average family size was 2.63.

The median age in the town was 51.6 years. 17.3% of residents were under the age of 18; 6.7% were between the ages of 18 and 24; 13.4% were from 25 to 44; 37.5% were from 45 to 64; and 25% were 65 years of age or older. The gender makeup of the town was 57.2% male and 42.8% female.

=== 2000 census ===
As of the 2000 census, there were 260 people, 110 households, and 72 families living in the town. The population density was 484.7 people per square mile (187.1 people/km^{2}). There were 133 housing units at an average density of 247.9 units per square mile (95.7 units/km^{2}). The racial makeup of the town was 96.15% White, 1.92% Native American and 1.92% from two or more races. Hispanic or Latino of any race were 4.23% of the population.

There were 110 households, out of which 32.7% had children under the age of 18 living with them, 50.0% were married couples living together, 11.8% had a female householder with no husband present, and 34.5% were non-families. 32.7% of all households were made up of individuals, and 10.9% had someone living alone who was 65 years of age or older. The average household size was 2.36 and the average family size was 2.96.

In the town, the age distribution of the population shows 28.5% under the age of 18, 3.8% from 18 to 24, 23.8% from 25 to 44, 28.1% from 45 to 64, and 15.8% who were 65 years of age or older. The median age was 41 years. For every 100 females, there were 89.8 males. For every 100 females age 18 and over, there were 91.8 males.

The median income for a household in the town was $34,688, and the median income for a family was $45,000. Males had a median income of $31,964 versus $33,750 for females. The per capita income for the town was $17,487. About 16.2% of families and 20.1% of the population were below the poverty line, including 29.8% of those under the age of eighteen and 8.9% of those 65 or over.
