= Connell, Washington =

- City
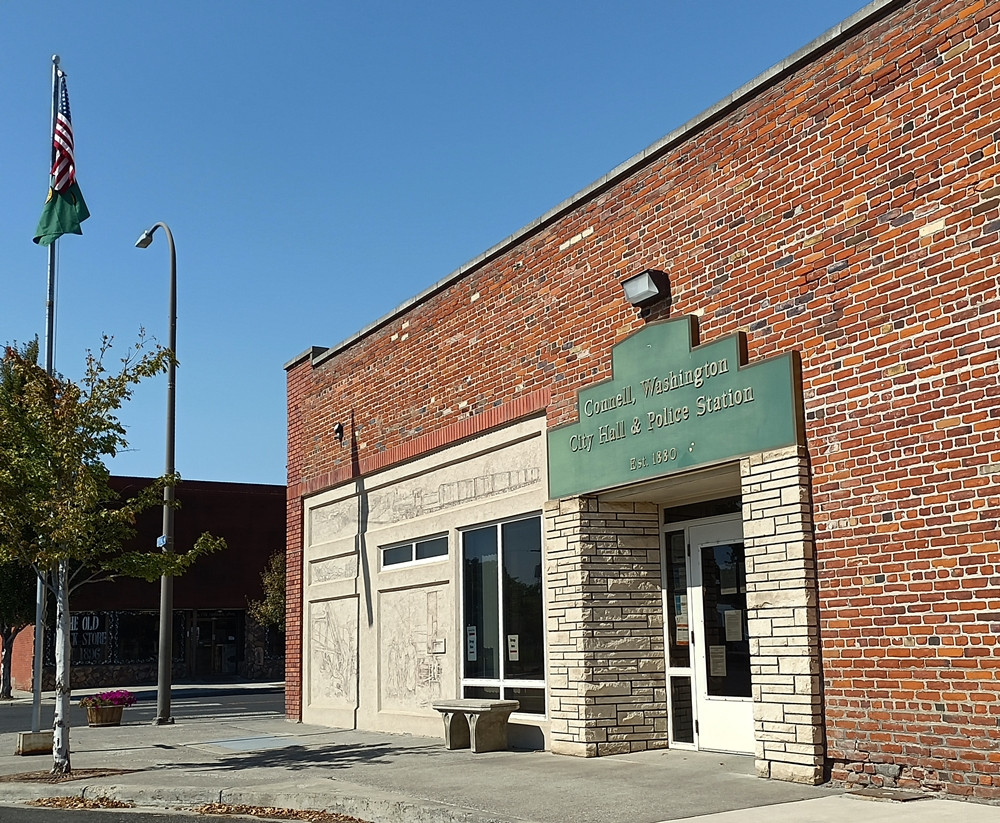
- Connell City Hall pictured in 2021
- Interactive map of Connell, Washington
- Coordinates: 46.660492°N 118.840553°W
- Country: United States
- State: Washington
- County: Franklin
- Founded: 1883
- Incorporated: November 28, 1910
- Named for: Joseph Connell

Government
  - Type: Mayor–council
  - Mayor: Lee Barrow

Area
  - Total: 7.441 sq mi (19.273 km^{2})
  - Land: 7.441 sq mi (19.273 km^{2})
  - Water: 0 sq mi (0.000 km^{2}) 0.0%
- Elevation: 906 ft (276 m)

Population (2020)
  - Total: 5,441
  - Estimate (2024): 5,071
  - Density: 731.2/sq mi (282.3/km^{2})
- Time zone: UTC−8 (Pacific (PST))
  - Summer (DST): UTC−7 (PDT)
- ZIP Code: 99326
- Area code: 509
- FIPS code: 53-14485
- GNIS feature ID: 2410216
- Website: cityofconnell.com

Connell (/kɑːˈnɛl/) is a city in Franklin County, Washington, United States. The population was 5,441 at the 2020 census, and was estimated at 5,071 in 2024.

== History ==
=== Early settlement ===
Prior to 1883, the area known as Connell was used by ranchers as open range for cattle and horses. The community was established in 1883 as a junction between the Northern Pacific Railroad and the Oregon Railroad and Navigation Company. The new town was called Palouse Junction by Jacob Cornelius Connell, a railroad official and resident. Palouse Junction was unique on the Ainsworth—Spokane line, in that it was not on a river. It was also the gateway to the Palouse via the OR&N's line to Washtucna. Water for trains and for the town was from public wells dug by the railroad. At some time between 1886 and 1900, the town was renamed to Connell.

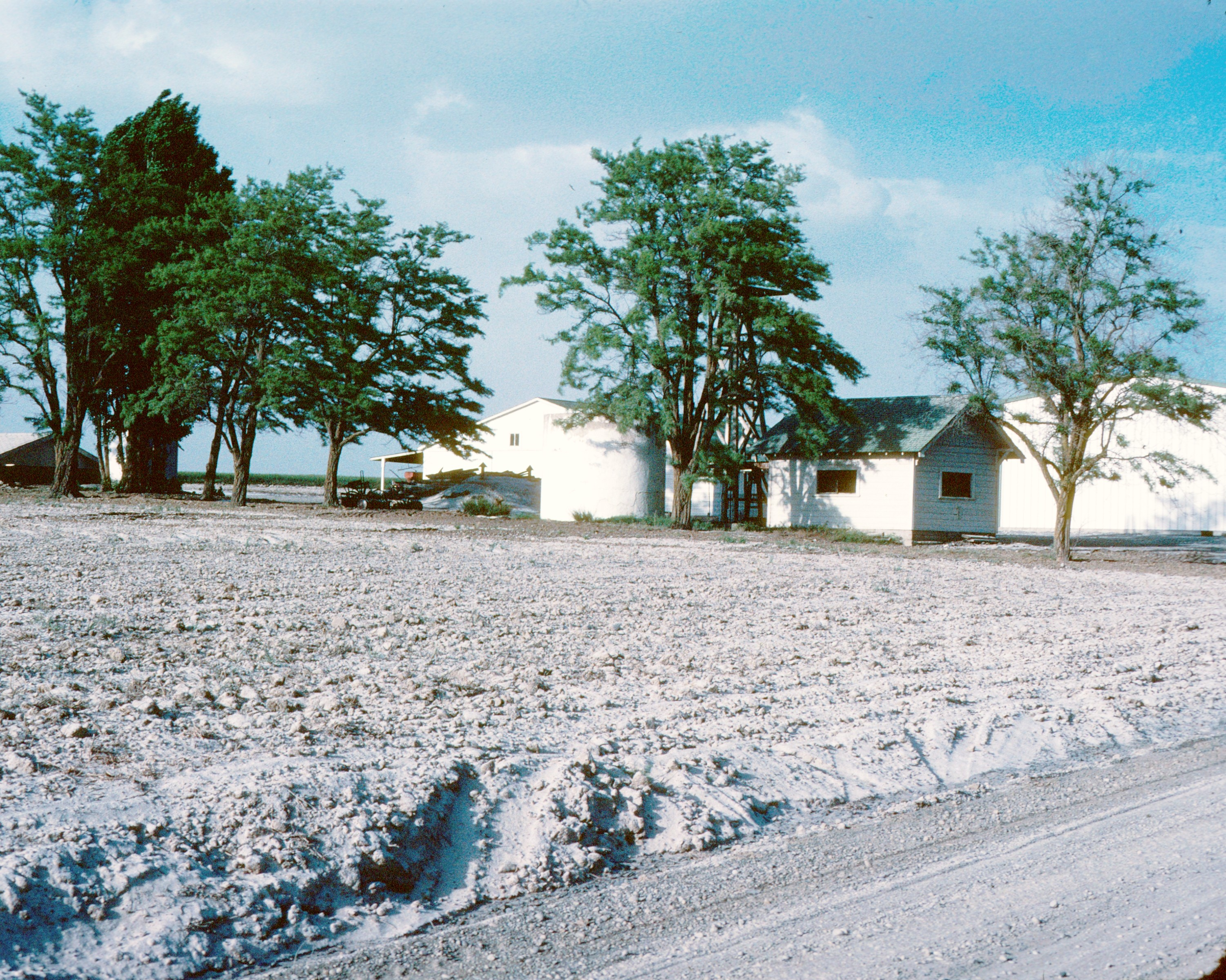
Ash deposits in Connell from the 1980 eruption of Mount St. Helens

The Northern Pacific Railroad ceased service to the station in 1890, but the Union Pacific Railroad took over the station in 1901, and the town began to grow again. A school district was formed sometime between 1900 and 1904. In 1902 the Franklin County Bank was Incorporated in Connell, and the Connell Land and Improvement Company was established. Also in that year, the county allowed a franchisee to begin piping in water for the town. The attempts to bring water into the town were found lacking and the following year a well was dug that hit water at 268 feet (82 m). In 1903, lots on the west side of the tracks were sold, and a new commercial district began to grow; a number of existing buildings were moved to the new lots.

By this time, the town rivaled Pasco in importance in Franklin County. Unfortunately, much of the business district was destroyed by fire in July 1905. The destroyed sections were quickly rebuilt using brick. Connell was officially incorporated on November 28, 1910. Dryland wheat farming was the lifeblood of Connell through most of the twentieth century.

=== Present day ===
The primary industrial base is agricultural chemicals and the Coyote Ridge Corrections Center, a minimum and medium-security correctional facility that is capable of holding 2600 offenders. The community is also home to the North Franklin School District where there is a high school, junior high, grade school and administration offices.

In 1998 the city approved a "water system plan" that would include the purchase of additional water rights to secure water for future growth in residential, commercial and industrial activities. By 2007, the water system plan was completed. New waterlines had been installed to replace aging pipes, reservoirs were upgraded and additional wells were brought into the system.

Continuing the community's infrastructure overhaul, the city also rebuilt Columbia Avenue, the main thoroughfare, and reconstructed its industrial streets, and received a grant award to reconstruct a portion of Clark Street. This roadway connects the downtown to Highway 260 on the west side of town, and serves the junior and senior high schools and administration buildings for the school district. Several businesses have left the city and very few new businesses have been established.

== Government ==
Connell has a strong-mayor form of city government. In 1989, Connell established the position of city administrator. As of January 2022, the mayor was Lee Barrow, and the city administrator was Cathleen Koch.

== Geography ==
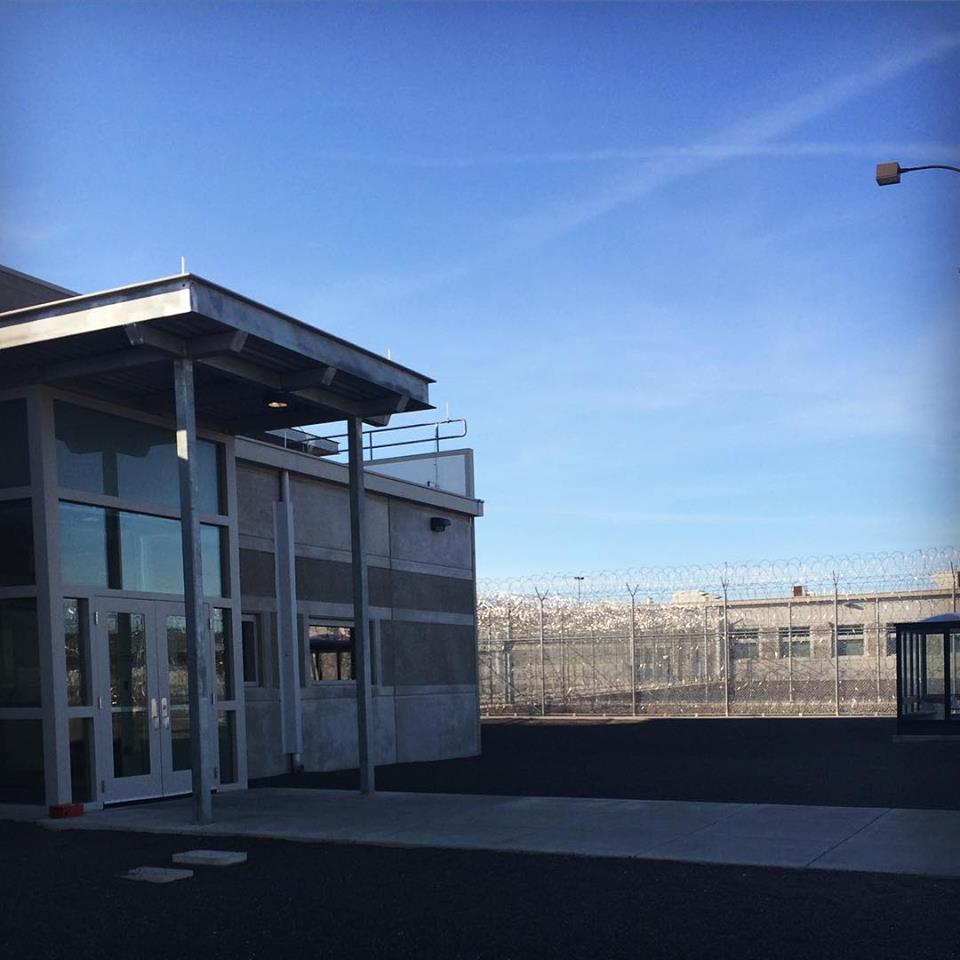
CRCC Visitor Entry

According to the United States Census Bureau, the city has a total area of 7.441 square miles (19.27 km^{2}), all land.

The site of the town is located in a depression formed by the convergence of Providence Coulee, coming from the north, Washtucna Coulee from the east, and Esquatzel Coulee to the southeast. Terrain rises a few hundred feet from the floor of the coulees to the higher land surrounding Connell. Ephemeral streams flow through these coulees. U.S. Route 395 passes through Connell, connecting the town with Interstate 90 at Ritzville to the northeast and Interstate 82 at the Tri-Cities to the southwest. State Route 260 begins a few miles west of Connell and passes through the town as it heads east along Washtucna Coulee to Washtucna.

=== Climate ===
According to the Köppen Climate Classification system, Connell has a semi-arid climate, abbreviated "BSk" on climate maps. It is the least snowy city in Eastern Washington, on average.

Climate data for Connell, Washington
Month	Jan	Feb	Mar	Apr	May	Jun	Jul	Aug	Sep	Oct	Nov	Dec	Year
Record high °F (°C)	63 (17)	76 (24)	84 (29)	99 (37)	101 (38)	107 (42)	112 (44)	114 (46)	102 (39)	90 (32)	75 (24)	67 (19)	114 (46)
Mean daily maximum °F (°C)	35.5 (1.9)	43.3 (6.3)	54.4 (12.4)	64.1 (17.8)	73.2 (22.9)	81.0 (27.2)	90.4 (32.4)	88.5 (31.4)	78.2 (25.7)	64.1 (17.8)	46.9 (8.3)	37.3 (2.9)	63.1 (17.3)
Mean daily minimum °F (°C)	22.4 (−5.3)	27.4 (−2.6)	32.0 (0.0)	36.0 (2.2)	42.4 (5.8)	48.7 (9.3)	54.5 (12.5)	53.2 (11.8)	46.0 (7.8)	37.3 (2.9)	30.4 (−0.9)	25.2 (−3.8)	38.0 (3.3)
Record low °F (°C)	−28 (−33)	−30 (−34)	6 (−14)	11 (−12)	21 (−6)	28 (−2)	31 (−1)	31 (−1)	19 (−7)	4 (−16)	−12 (−24)	−29 (−34)	−30 (−34)
Average precipitation inches (mm)	1.1 (28)	0.9 (23)	0.9 (23)	0.8 (20)	0.8 (20)	0.7 (18)	0.3 (7.6)	0.3 (7.6)	0.5 (13)	0.8 (20)	1.4 (36)	1.4 (36)	9.9 (252.2)
Source: Weatherbase

== Demographics ==
Historical population
Census	Pop.	Note	%±
1920	311		—
1930	321		3.2%
1940	365		13.7%
1950	465		27.4%
1960	906		94.8%
1970	1,161		28.1%
1980	1,981		70.6%
1990	2,005		1.2%
2000	2,956		47.4%
2010	4,209		42.4%
2020	5,441		29.3%
2024 (est.)	5,071		−6.8%
U.S. Decennial Census; 2020 Census

As of the 2023 American Community Survey, there are 1,104 estimated households in Connell with an average of 3.09 persons per household. The city has a median household income of $63,810. Approximately 13.1% of the city's population lives at or below the poverty line. Connell has an estimated 33.7% employment rate, with 9.7% of the population holding a bachelor's degree or higher and 75.9% holding a high school diploma. There were 1,187 housing units at an average density of 159.52 per square mile (61.6/km^{2}).

The top five reported languages (people were allowed to report up to two languages, thus the figures will generally add to more than 100%) were English (69.4%), Spanish (28.7%), Indo-European (0.5%), Asian and Pacific Islander (1.3%), and Other (0.1%).

The median age in the city was 38.8 years.

=== Racial and ethnic composition ===
Connell, Washington – racial and ethnic composition Note: the US Census treats Hispanic/Latino as an ethnic category. This table excludes Latinos from the racial categories and assigns them to a separate category. Hispanics/Latinos may be of any race.
Race / ethnicity (NH = non-Hispanic)	Pop. 1980	Pop. 1990	Pop. 2000	Pop. 2010	Pop. 2020
White alone (NH)	1,318 (66.53%)	1,114 (55.56%)	1,423 (48.14%)	2,013 (47.83%)	2,313 (42.51%)
Black or African American alone (NH)	3 (0.15%)	5 (0.25%)	112 (3.79%)	268 (6.37%)	433 (7.96%)
Native American or Alaska Native alone (NH)	—	4 (0.20%)	22 (0.74%)	74 (1.76%)	110 (2.02%)
Asian alone (NH)	—	181 (9.03%)	129 (4.36%)	111 (2.64%)	118 (2.17%)
Pacific Islander alone (NH)	—	—	1 (0.03%)	16 (0.38%)	2 (0.04%)
Other race alone (NH)	26 (1.31%)	8 (0.40%)	5 (0.17%)	3 (0.07%)	0 (0.00%)
Mixed race or multiracial (NH)	—	—	38 (1.29%)	68 (1.62%)	229 (4.21%)
Hispanic or Latino (any race)	634 (32.00%)	693 (34.56%)	1,226 (41.47%)	1,656 (39.34%)	2,236 (41.10%)
Total	1,981 (100.00%)	2,005 (100.00%)	2,956 (100.00%)	4,209 (100.00%)	5,441 (100.00%)

=== 2020 census ===
As of the 2020 census, there were 5,441 people, 958 households, and 710 families residing in the city at a population density of 707.82 inhabitants per square mile (273.3/km^{2}).

Of the 958 households, 48.2% had children under the age of 18 living in them, 51.7% were married-couple households, 17.4% were households with a male householder and no spouse or partner present, and 23.2% were households with a female householder and no spouse or partner present. About 19.1% of all households were made up of individuals and 5.8% had someone living alone who was 65 years of age or older.

There were 1,021 housing units at an average density of 132.82 per square mile (51.3/km^{2}), of which 6.2% were vacant. The homeowner vacancy rate was 0.2% and the rental vacancy rate was 9.4%.

The median age was 35.7 years; 18.6% of residents were under the age of 18 and 7.6% of residents were 65 years of age or older. For every 100 females there were 267.1 males, and for every 100 females age 18 and over there were 344.7 males age 18 and over. Ninety-nine point one percent of residents lived in urban areas, while 0.9% lived in rural areas.

Racial composition as of the 2020 census
Race	Number	Percent
White	2,655	48.8%
Black or African American	446	8.2%
American Indian and Alaska Native	158	2.9%
Asian	130	2.4%
Native Hawaiian and Other Pacific Islander	2	0.0%
Some other race	920	16.9%
Two or more races	1,130	20.8%
Hispanic or Latino (of any race)	2,236	41.1%

=== 2010 census ===
As of the 2010 census, there were 4,209 people, 878 households, and 689 families residing in the city. The population density was 534.95 inhabitants per square mile (206.5/km^{2}). There were 922 housing units at an average density of 117.18 per square mile (45.2/km^{2}). The racial makeup of the city was 73.41% White, 6.41% African American, 1.90% Native American, 2.68% Asian, 0.38% Pacific Islander, 12.21% from some other races and 2.99% from two or more races. Hispanic or Latino people of any race were 39.34% of the population.

There were 878 households, of which 50.5% had children under the age of 18 living with them, 55.2% were married couples living together, 15.3% had a female householder with no husband present, 8.0% had a male householder with no wife present, and 21.5% were non-families. 19.5% of all households were made up of individuals, and 5.9% had someone living alone who was 65 years of age or older. The average household size was 3.14 and the average family size was 3.53.

The median age in the city was 32.5 years. 23.7% of residents were under the age of 18; 10.3% were between the ages of 18 and 24; 37.6% were from 25 to 44; 22.8% were from 45 to 64; and 5.4% were 65 years of age or older. The gender makeup of the city was 67.5% male and 32.5% female.

=== 2000 census ===
As of the 2000 census, there were 2,956 people, 766 households, and 602 families residing in the city. The population density was 1,034.8 inhabitants per square mile (399.5/km^{2}). There were 891 housing units at an average density of 311.9 per square mile (120.4/km^{2}). The racial makeup of the city was 63.19% White, 3.92% African American, 1.12% Native American, 4.36% Asian, 0.03% Pacific Islander, 21.52% from some other races and 5.85% from two or more races. Hispanic or Latino people of any race were 41.47% of the population.

There were 766 households, out of which 48.8% had children under the age of 18 living with them, 61.1% were married couples living together, 11.4% had a female householder with no husband present, and 21.3% were non-families. 17.4% of all households were made up of individuals, and 7.6% had someone living alone who was 65 years of age or older. The average household size was 3.17 and the average family size was 3.59.

In the city, the age distribution of the population shows 31.4% under the age of 18, 12.2% from 18 to 24, 32.4% from 25 to 44, 18.3% from 45 to 64, and 5.7% who were 65 years of age or older. The median age was 29 years. For every 100 females, there were 142.9 males. For every 100 females age 18 and over, there were 160.3 males.

The median income for a household in the city was $33,992, and the median income for a family was $38,309. Males had a median income of $30,129 versus $24,444 for females. The per capita income for the city was $12,600. About 15.9% of families and 19.5% of the population were below the poverty line, including 26.7% of those under age 18 and 9.6% of those age 65 or over.
