= Columbia Plateau Trail =

Trail in Washington state, US

Columbia Plateau State Park Trail
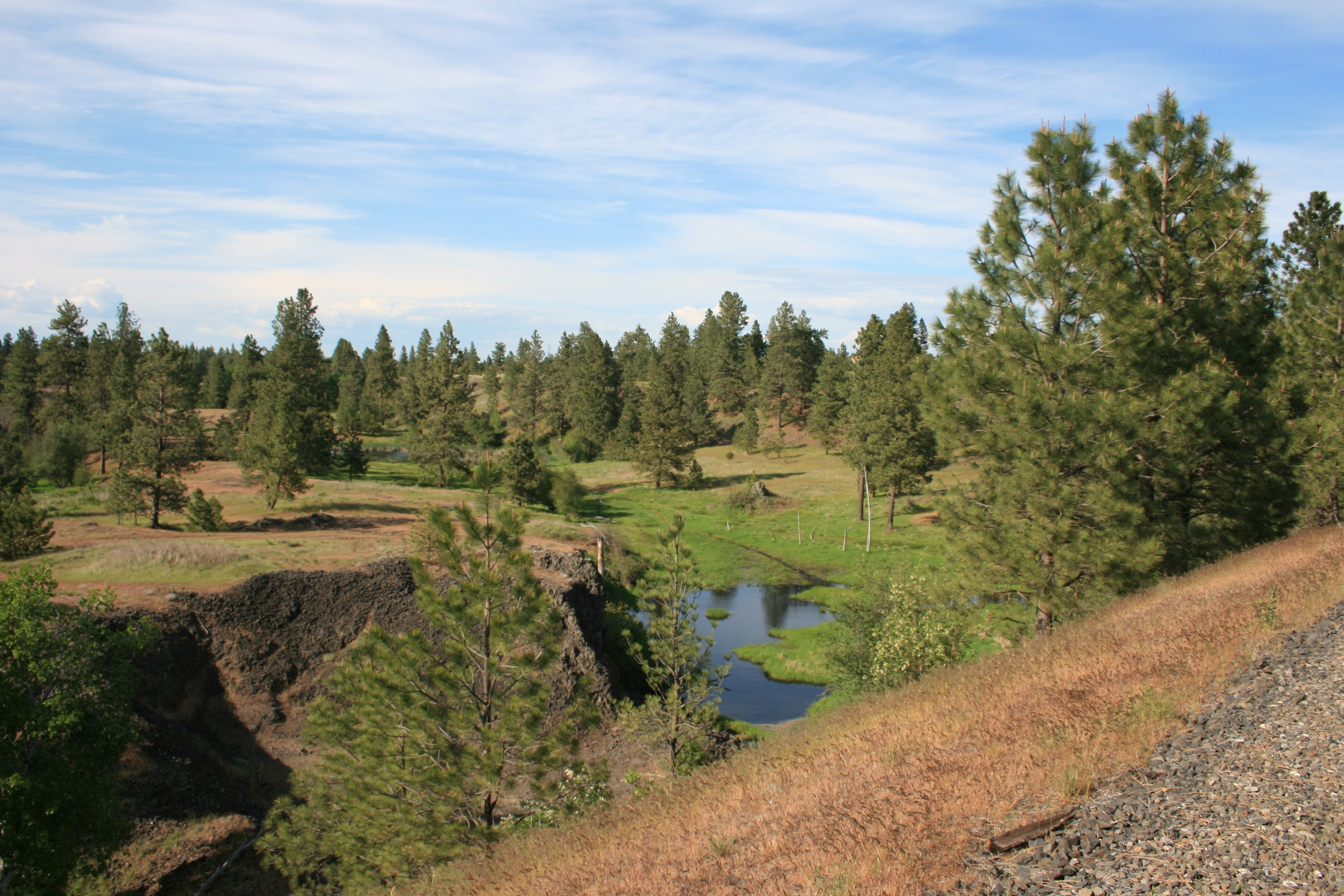
- The trail between the Martin Road and Amber Lake trailheads
- Length: 130 miles (210 km)
- Location: Eastern Washington
- Established: 1991
- Designation: Washington state park
- Trailheads: Fish Lake (47°31′19″N 117°30′57″W); Ice Harbor Dam (46°15′12″N 118°52′40″W)
- Use: Hiking, biking, horseback riding, in-line skating
- Sights: Turnbull National Wildlife Refuge, Snake River, railroad tunnels and trestles
- Surface: Various: asphalt, crushed rock
- Maintained by: Washington State Parks and Recreation Commission
- Website: Columbia Plateau Trail State Park

Location of trailheads in Washington

The Columbia Plateau State Park Trail is a 130-mile-long (210 km), 20-foot-wide (6.1 m) corridor in eastern Washington state maintained as part of the Washington State Park system. The rail trail runs along the abandoned right-of-way of the former Spokane, Portland and Seattle Railway.

== Route ==
Beginning at Cheney, Washington, the trail runs to the confluence of the Snake and Columbia rivers at Pasco, passing through five counties in the southeastern part of the state. The trail is mostly gravel, except for a 3.75 mile portion between the Cheney and Fish Lake trailheads. Recreational uses include hiking, mountain biking, horseback riding, in-line skating on paved portions, and wildlife viewing. The close proximity of the railroad to the paved portion makes this section of the trail a popular spot for railfanning.

=== Access points ===
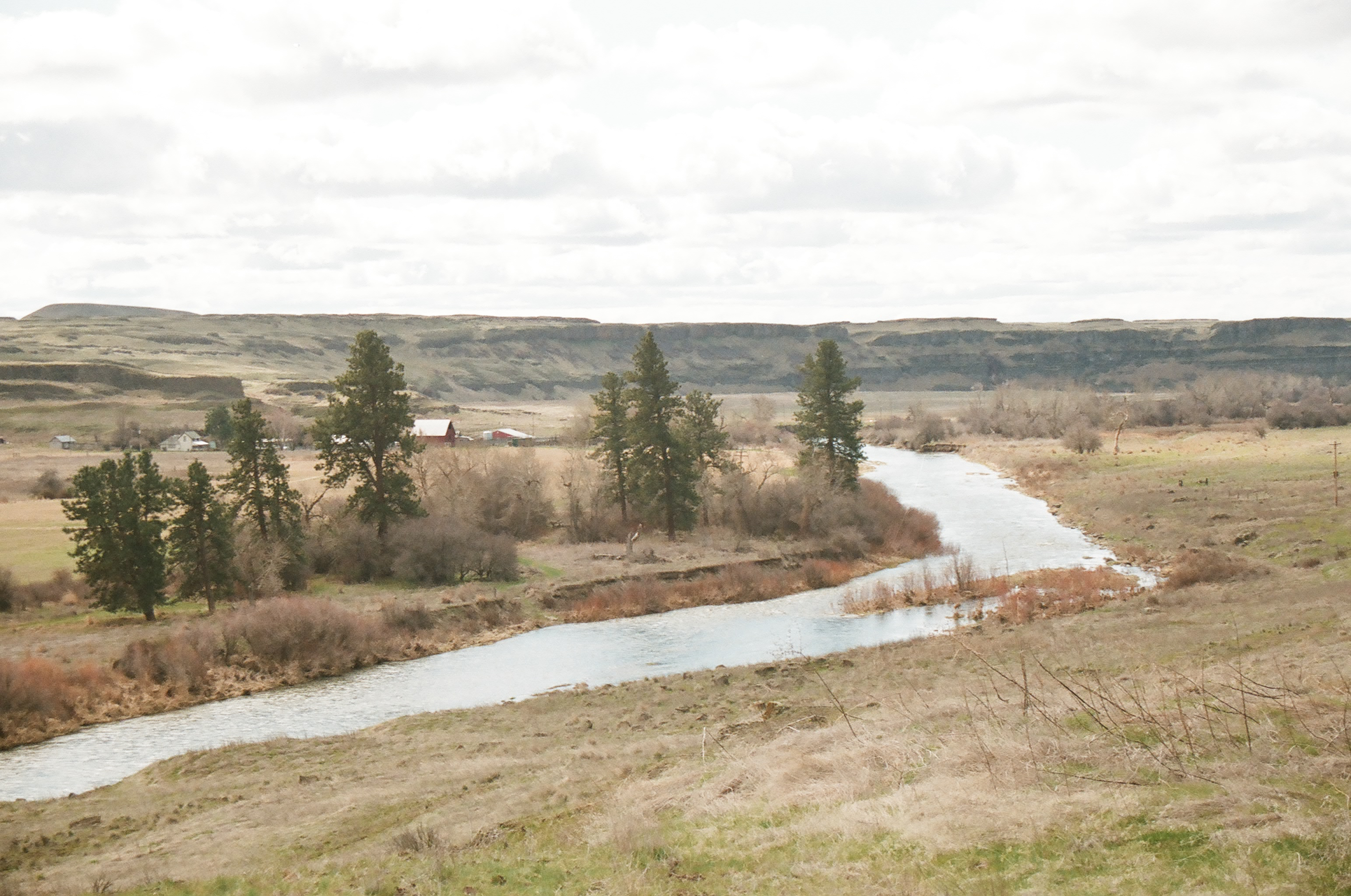
The trail follows the Palouse River for a portion of its course.

Proceeding from the northeast toward the southwest, major access points include:

- Fishlake trailhead – Milepost 365
- Cheney Trailhead – Milepost 361.25
- Amber Lake Trailhead – Milestone 349.25
- Martin Road Trailhead – Milestone 342
- Lamont Trailhead
- John Wayne Pioneer Trail intersection (no trailhead)
- Benge Trailhead
- Washtucna Trailhead (Trail Administrative Area in downtown Washtucna)
- Kahlotus Trailhead & Visitor Center 46°38′41.77″N 118°33′17.67″W
- Snake River Junction Trailhead
- Ice Harbor Dam Trailhead 46°14′58″N 118°52′46″W
- Sacajawea State Park Pasco

== History ==
The rail bed was constructed by the Spokane, Portland and Seattle Railway Company in the early 1900s. That line's successor, the Burlington Northern Company, abandoned the line in 1987, paving the way for the state to acquire 130 miles of right-of-way, from milepost 235.0 near East Pasco to milepost 365.0 near South Cheney, in 1991. State Park management began in 1992. Standing remnants of the trail's railroad past include the historic Burr Canyon Trestle built in 1908.

== Natural features ==
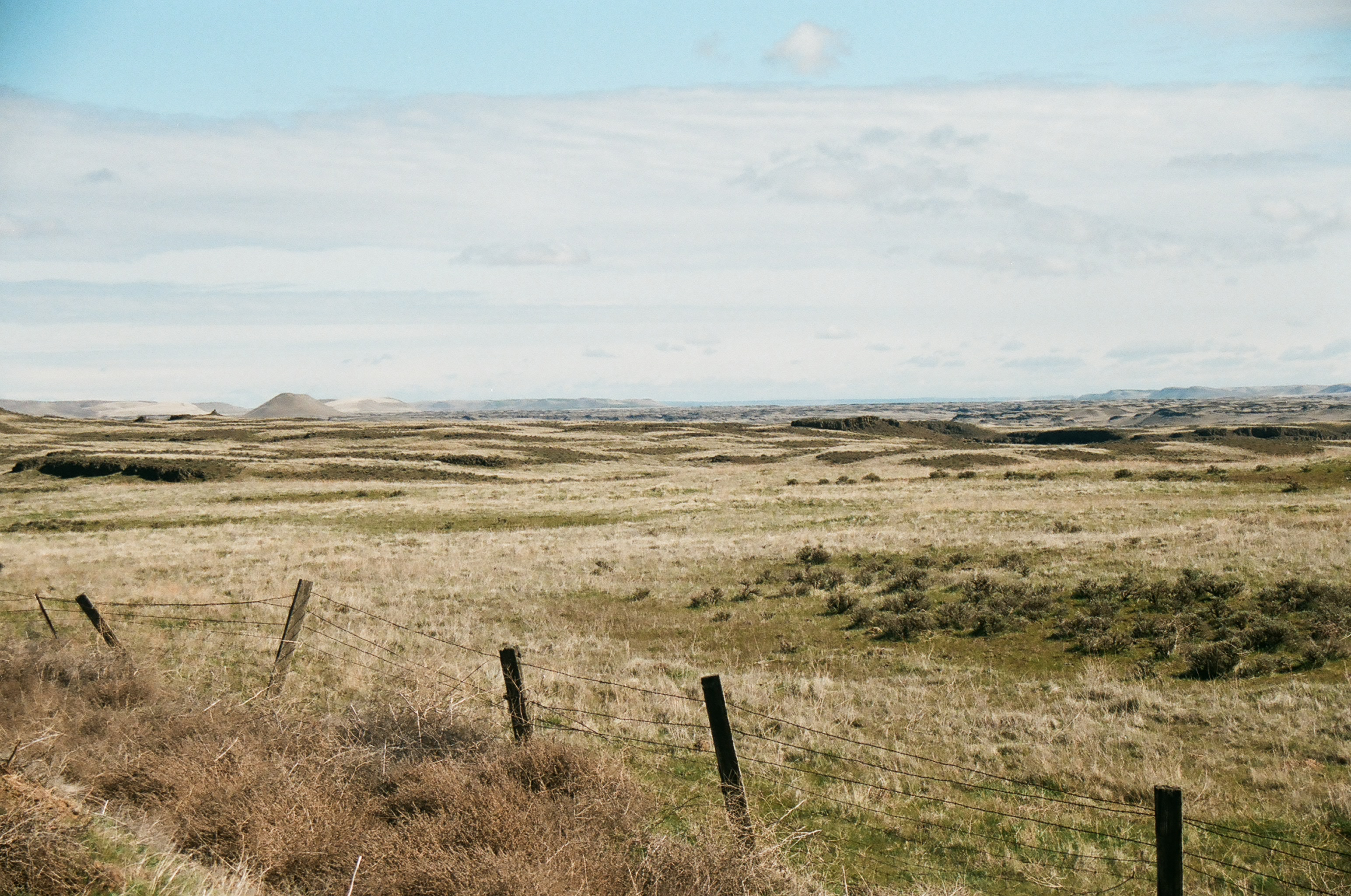
Scablands in the vicinity of Cow Creek

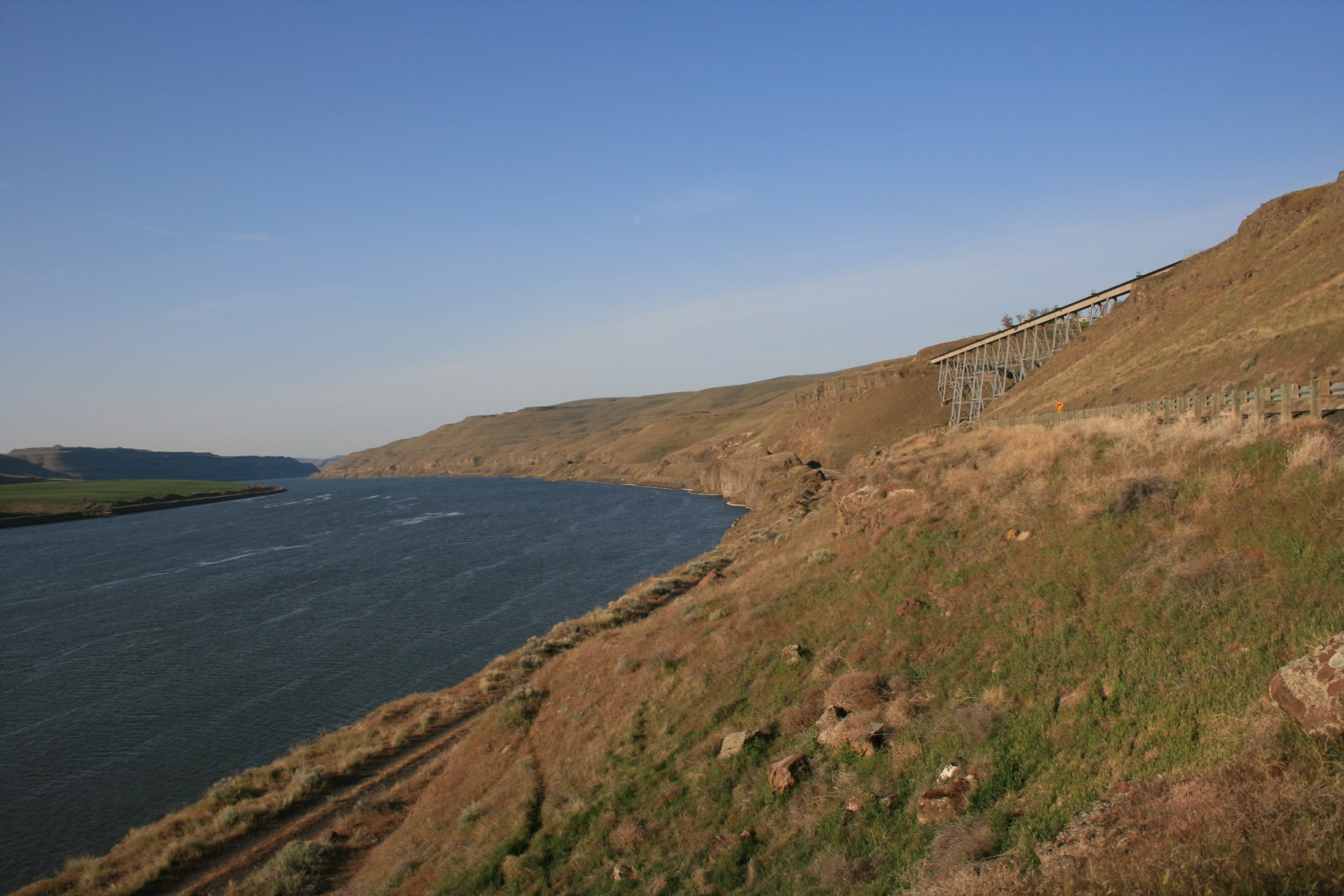
The trail runs along the lower Snake River—10 miles (16 km) above its confluence with the Columbia River. The trail lies over 100 feet (30 m) above the river at this location; the railroad trestle to the upper right is part of the trail.

=== Wildlife ===
The northern portion of the trail passes through a habitat of primarily ponderosa pine/grassland mixed with exposed basalt cliffs and areas of meadow and shrub-steppe. It bisects the Turnbull National Wildlife Refuge, an area of northeastern Washington on the eastern edge of the Columbia River Basin which encompasses approximately 16,000 acres (6,500 ha) of the channeled scablands. The numerous erosion-created potholes have formed over 130 marshes, wetlands and lakes which attract a wide range of waterfowl; more than 200 different kinds of birds have been recorded in this area. Other wildlife inhabiting the reserve include elk, mule deer, white-tailed deer, coyotes, badgers, porcupines, muskrats, and beavers.

=== Geology ===
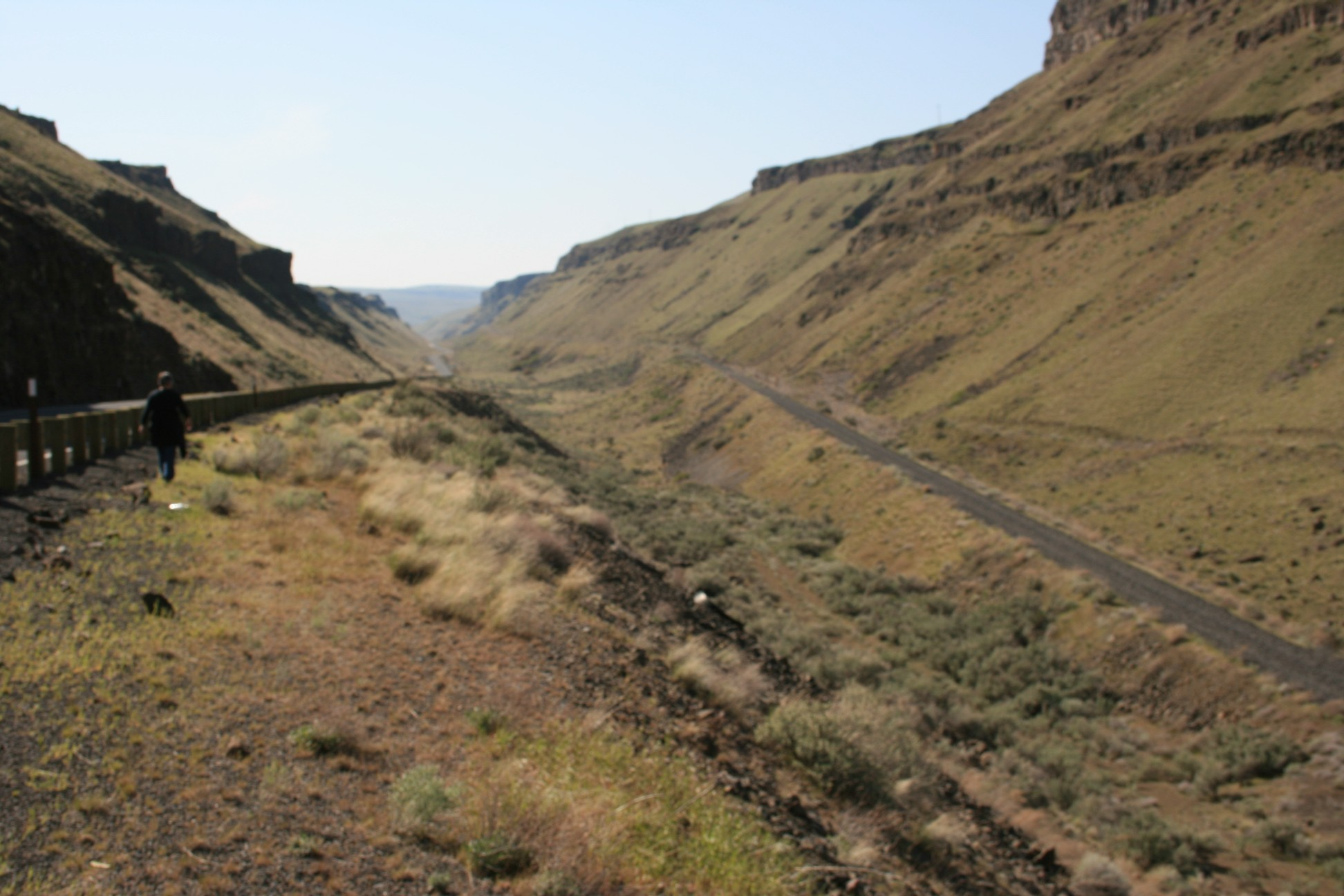
The Columbia Plateau Trail, seen to the right, drops down 400 feet (120 m) in altitude as it descends through Devil's Canyon to the Snake River.

As it crosses the Columbia River Plateau, the trail passes through the unique geological erosion features of the channeled scablands created by the cataclysmic Missoula Floods that swept periodically across this portion of eastern Washington as well as other parts of the Columbia River Plateau during the Pleistocene epoch. The trail follows one of the many paths taken by the Missoula Floods as they cut through the Columbia River Basalt. Notable geologic features which the trail passes include the Cow Creek scabland, the point at which the Palouse River departs its former course (captured by ice-age flood erosion), Washtucna Coulee (the abandoned course of the Palouse River scoured wide by the floods), Devil's Canyon (a dry, straight, 4-mile-long (6.4 km) former flood channel which descends to the Snake River), giant current-created ripples formed by the flood currents in the low lands along the Snake River, and the Walker Bar, created by the outflow of the floods.
