= Klickitat =

Klickitat may refer to:

- Klickitat (tribe)
- Klickitat language
- Klickitat War of 1855
- Klickitat County, Washington
- Klickitat, Washington
- Klickitat River, a tributary of the Columbia River, in Washington State
- MV Klickitat, a member of the Washington State Ferries fleet
- Klickitat Trail
- Klickitat Street, city street in northeast Portland, Oregon, United States
- Klickitat dialect
- Klickitat Glacier, on the slopes of Mount Adams a stratovolcano in the U.S. state of Washington
- Klickitat Mineral Springs
- Klickitat aster, flowering plant in the family Asteraceae
- USS Klickitat (AOG-64), lead ship of the type T1 Klickitat-class gasoline tanker built for the US Navy during World War II
- Klickitat Elementary and High School, public school in Klickitat, Washington
