= Burdoin Fire =

2025 wildfire in Oregon

- Part of the 2025 Oregon wildfires and 2025 Washington wildfires
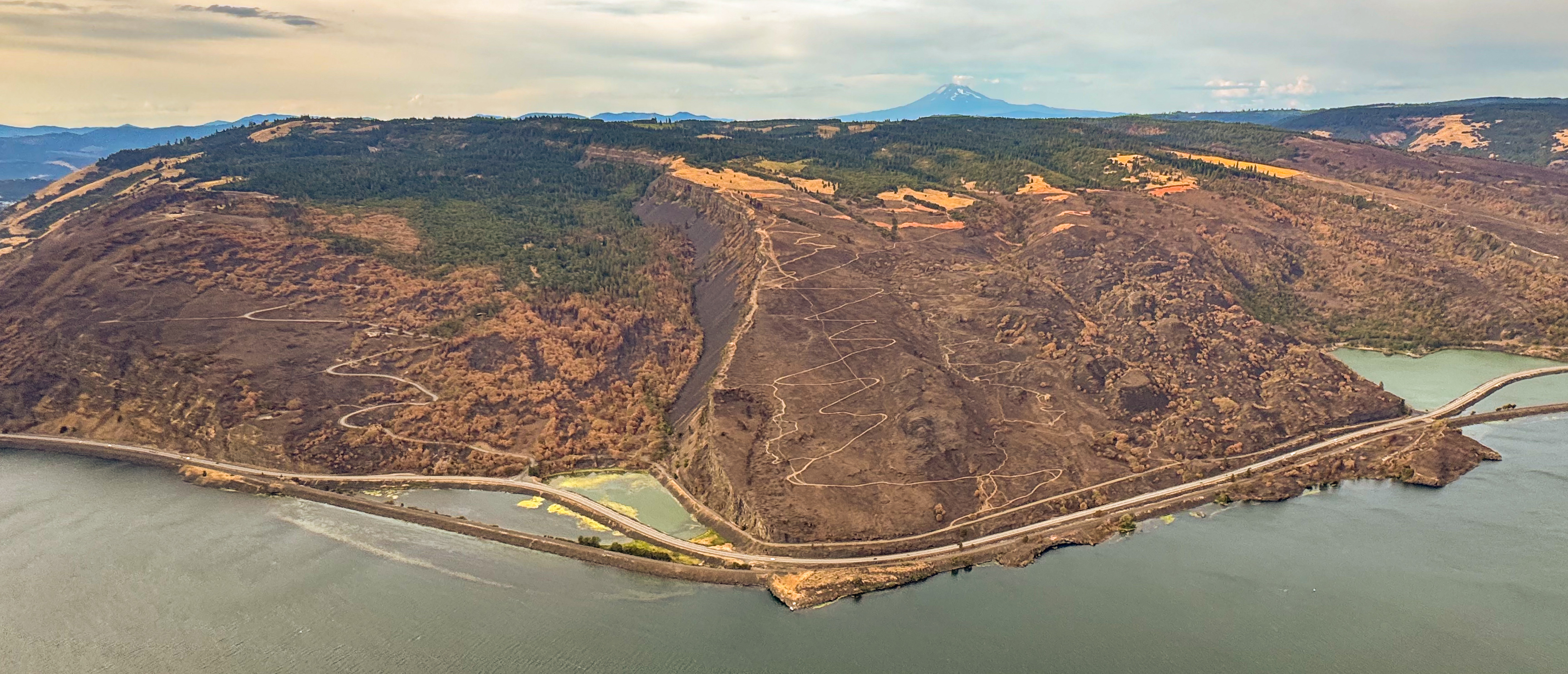
- Land after the fire, September 2025
- Date: July 18, 2025 – Present
- Location: White Salmon, Washington & Lyle, Washington
- Coordinates: 45°42′50″N 121°25′50″W

Statistics
- Burned area: 10,675 acres (4,320 ha)

Impacts
- Structures destroyed: 100+
- Cost: $25 million

Ignition
- Cause: Undetermined

Map
- Location in northern Oregon

The Burdoin Fire is a wildfire burning near White Salmon, Washington and Lyle, Washington along the Washington-Oregon border that began on July 18, 2025. As of August 9, the fire had so far burned 10,675 acres (4,320 ha) and was 94% contained.

== Events ==
=== July ===
The Burdoin Fire was first reported on July 18, 2025, at around 2:29 pm PST.

On July 20, a fighterfighter was hospitalized while battling the fire. 14 homes have also been destroyed due to the fire.

=== Cause ===
The most likely cause of the fire was determined to be a faulty exhaust system on an unidentified large motor vehicle which caused a backfire. The backfire resulted in the ejection of "white hot" particles of metal, a few of which ignited dry grass on the roadside.

== Impact ==
14 primary structures have been destroyed and at least 80 minor structures were either damaged or destroyed due to the fire.

=== Closures and evacuations ===
On July 19 evacuation orders were issued for the town of Lyle, Washington.

Washington State Route 14 was closed in both directions from milepost 66 to milepost 75.8. State Route 142 was also closed from State Route 14 to milepost 4.

== Gallery ==
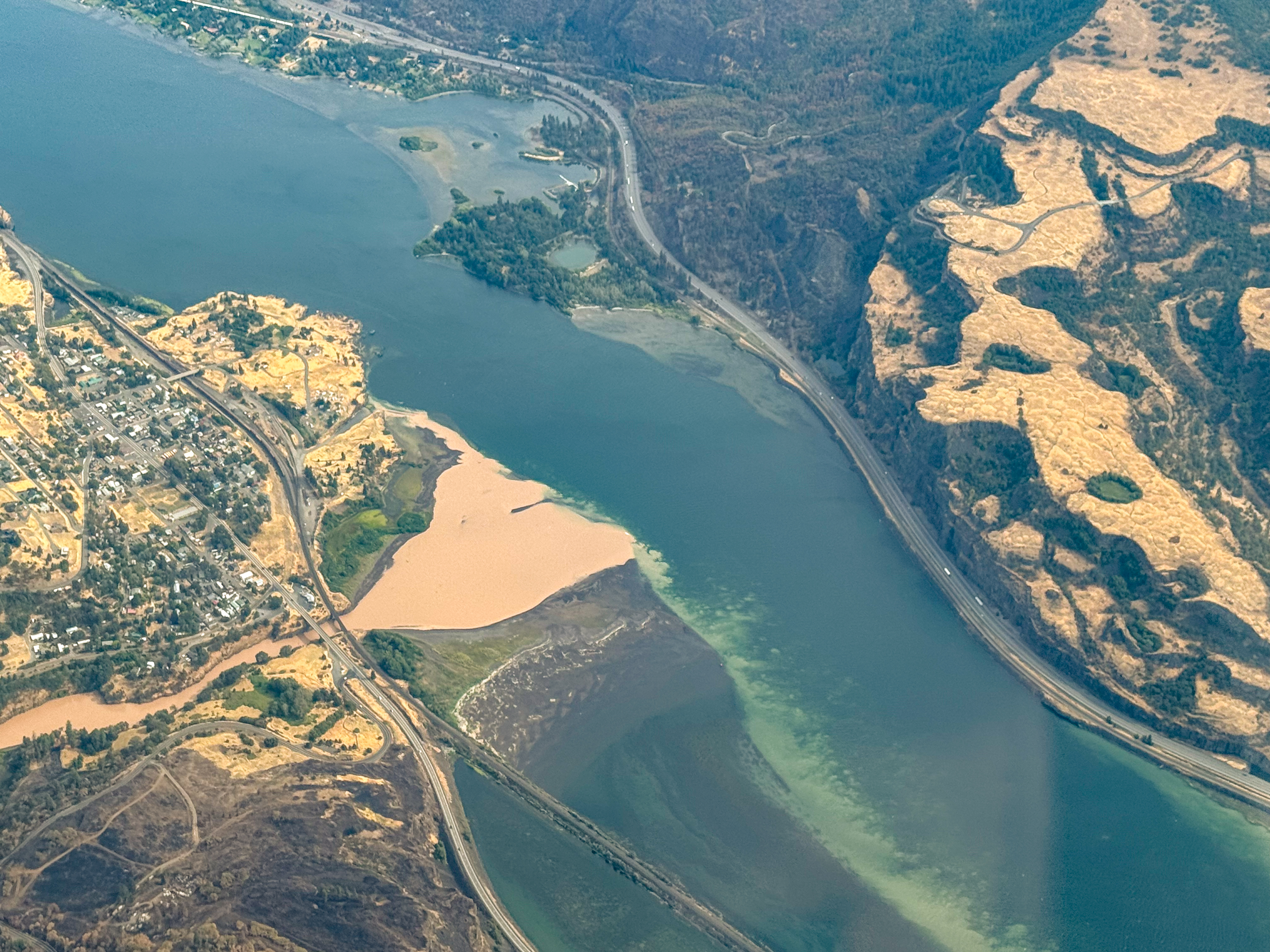
Outflow of the Klickitat River after the fire

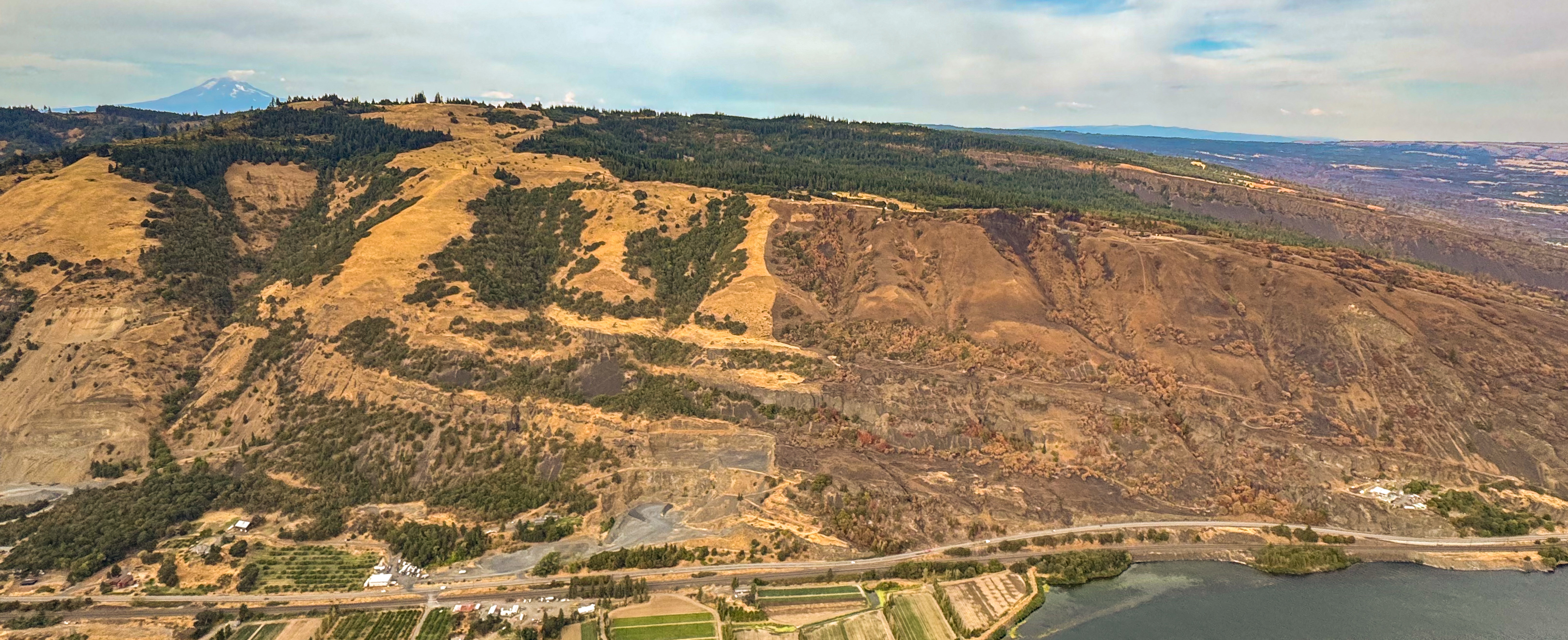
Aerial view of the land

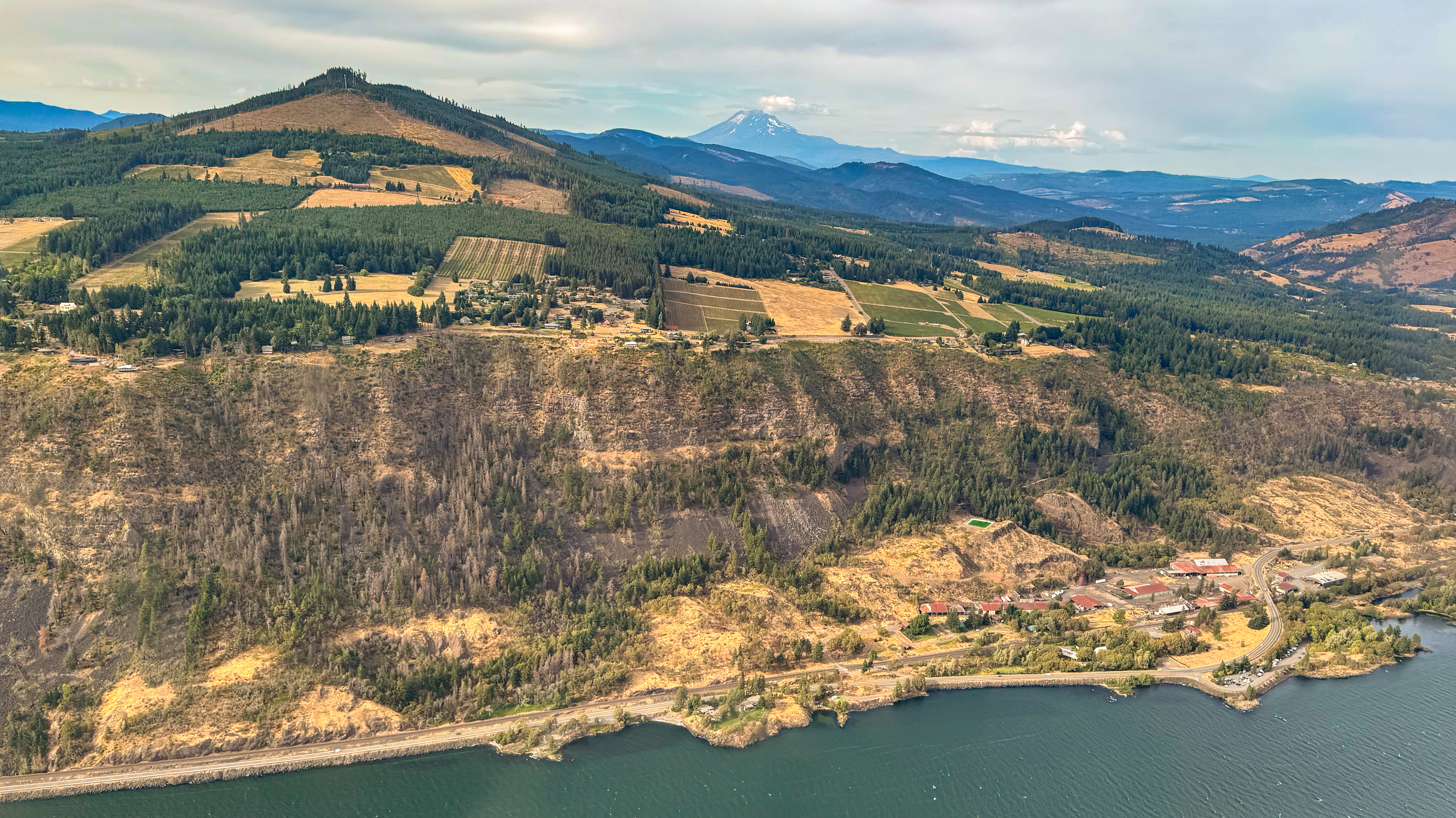
Aerial view of the land

== See also ==
- 2025 Washington wildfires
- List of Washington wildfires
