= Klickitat, Washington =

Census-designated place in Klickitat County, Washington, United States

- Census-designated place
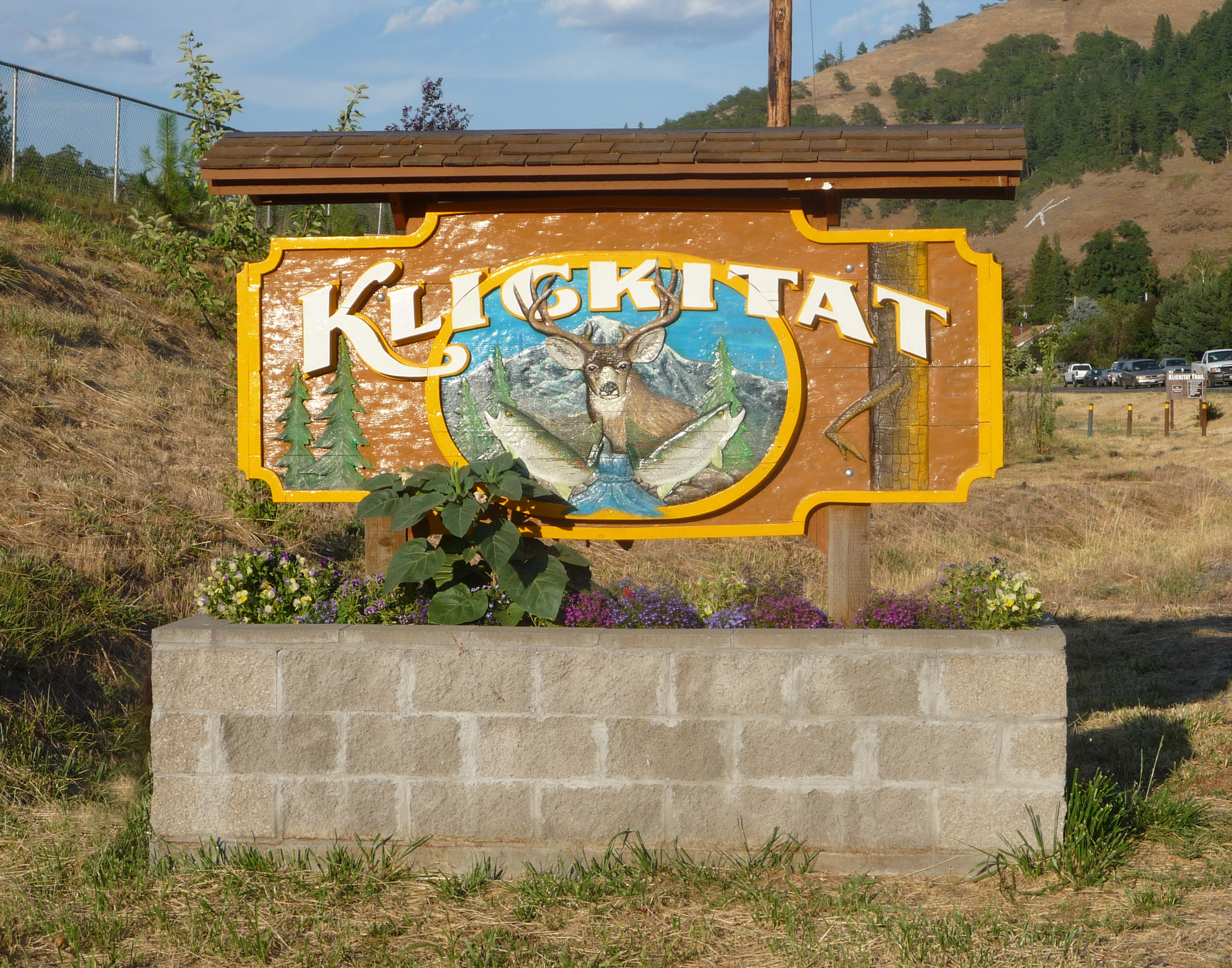
- Sign at the entrance of town, July 2009

- Location in Klickitat County, Washington
- Coordinates: 45°49′05″N 121°09′45″W
- Country: United States
- State: Washington
- County: Klickitat

Area
  - Total: 0.94 sq mi (2.43 km^{2})
  - Land: 0.94 sq mi (2.43 km^{2})
  - Water: 0 sq mi (0.0 km^{2})
- Elevation: 689 ft (210 m)

Population (2020)
  - Total: 320
  - Density: 340/sq mi (130/km^{2})
- Time zone: UTC-8 (Pacific (PST))
  - Summer (DST): UTC-7 (PDT)
- ZIP codes: 98628, 98670
- Area code: 509
- FIPS code: 53-36115
- GNIS feature ID: 2408494

Klickitat is a census-designated place (CDP) in Klickitat County, Washington, United States. The population was 320 at the 2020 census. Once the site of a lumber mill, it is now primarily a bedroom community.

== History ==
The site where the town is located was originally called "Wrights" after one of the original settlers. This was the name given to the rail stop there. The rail stop down the river at milepost 7.2 was named "Klickitat", after the Klickitat people and the railroad later switched the two signs when the carbonated beverage company Klickitat Pop (operating near the town) gained fame. On February 7, 1910, the name of the town post office was officially changed to "Klickitat".

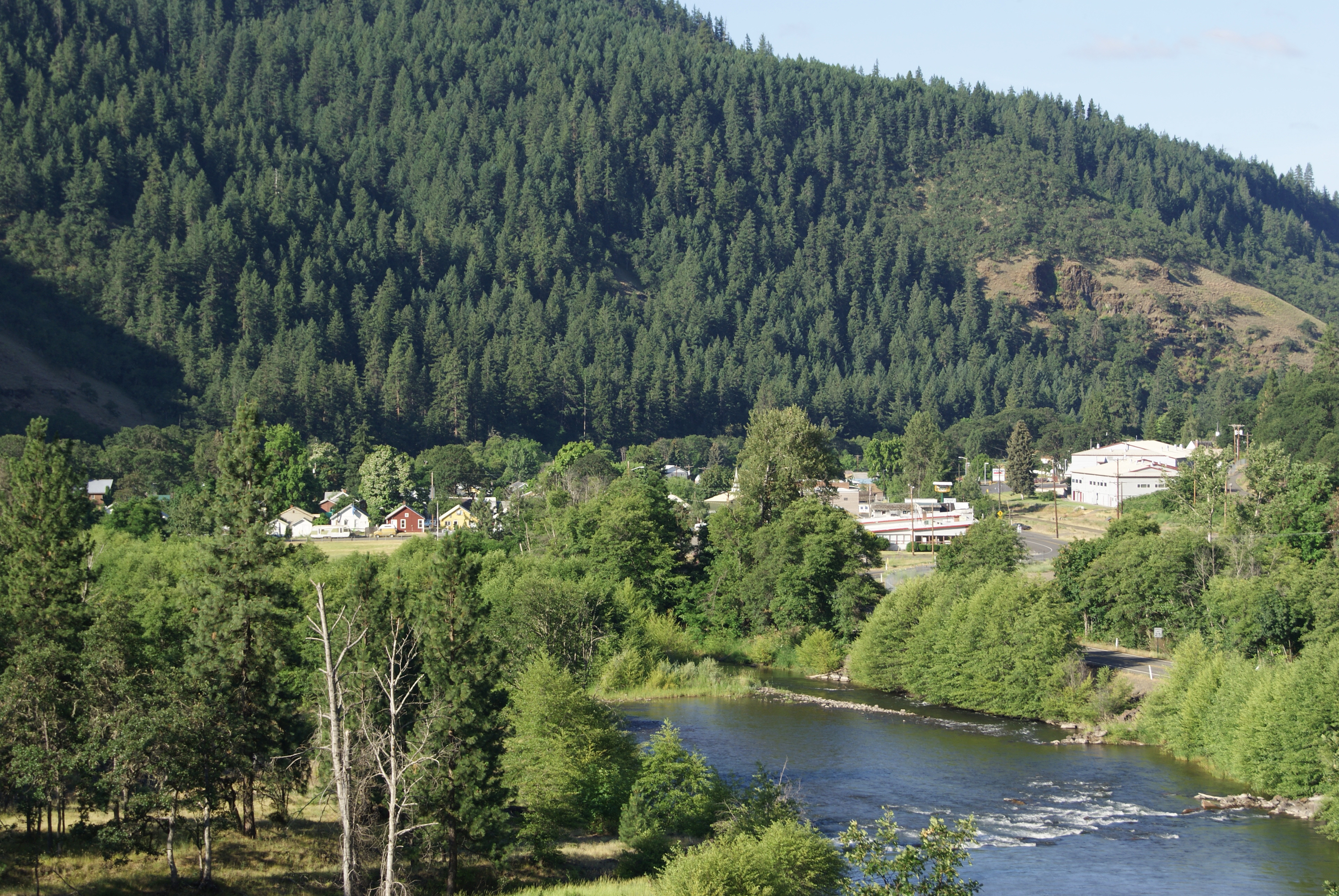
Klickitat, July 2010

The first non-native settlers arrived in 1890 seeking land to homestead. The abundance of timber drew in other settlers during the early 1900s. Travel through the Klickitat canyon and up to the plateau was arduous until the completion of a rail line in 1903.[4, p. 47] The rail line eased travel and facilitated the transportation of people, crops, livestock and timber. The lumber mill was the primary employer in town, with the first major mill formed 1909, until 1994 when the mill was permanently closed. The naturally carbonated Klickitat Mineral Springs just east of town gave rise to health spas, a carbonated beverage company, and a large dry ice plant which operated until 1957.

== Geography ==
Klickitat is located along the Klickitat River. The closest major town is Goldendale, 21 miles (34 km) to the east. State Route 142 passes through Klickitat, leading southwest (downstream) 3 miles (5 km) to Pitt and east (upstream) the same distance to Wahkiacus. Lyle, along the Columbia River, is 13 miles (21 km) to the southwest via Route 142.

According to the United States Census Bureau, the Klickitat CDP has a total area of 0.93 square miles (2.4 km^{2}), all of it land.

== Demographics ==
Historical population
Census	Pop.	Note	%±
2000	417		—
2010	362		−13.2%
2020	320		−11.6%
U.S. Decennial Census; 1990 2000 2010 2020

Klickitat first appeared as a census designated place in the 2000 U.S. census.

=== Racial and ethnic composition ===
Klickitat CDP, Washington – Racial and ethnic composition Note: the US Census treats Hispanic/Latino as an ethnic category. This table excludes Latinos from the racial categories and assigns them to a separate category. Hispanics/Latinos may be of any race.
Race / Ethnicity (NH = Non-Hispanic)	Pop 2000	Pop 2010	Pop 2020	% 2000	% 2010	% 2020
White alone (NH)	375	330	270	89.93%	91.16%	84.38%
Black or African American alone (NH)	0	2	0	0.00%	0.55%	0.00%
Native American or Alaska Native alone (NH)	15	5	3	3.60%	1.38%	0.94%
Asian alone (NH)	4	0	2	0.96%	0.00%	0.63%
Native Hawaiian or Pacific Islander alone (NH)	0	0	0	0.00%	0.00%	0.00%
Other race alone (NH)	0	0	7	0.00%	0.00%	2.19%
Mixed race or Multiracial (NH)	12	14	29	2.88%	3.87%	9.06%
Hispanic or Latino (any race)	11	11	9	2.64%	3.04%	2.81%
Total	417	362	320	100.00%	100.00%	100.00%

=== 2000 census ===
As of the census of 2000, there were 417 people, 147 households, and 110 families residing in the CDP. The population density was 161.9 people per square mile (62.4/km^{2}). There were 173 housing units at an average density of 67.2/sq mi (25.9/km^{2}). The racial makeup of the CDP was 92.33% White, 0.24% African American, 3.60% Native American, 0.96% Asian, and 2.88% from two or more races. Hispanic or Latino of any race were 2.64% of the population.

There were 147 households, out of which 43.5% had children under the age of 18 living with them, 58.5% were married couples living together, 10.2% had a female householder with no husband present, and 24.5% were non-families. 21.1% of all households were made up of individuals, and 5.4% had someone living alone who was 65 years of age or older. The average household size was 2.84 and the average family size was 3.28.

In the CDP, the population was spread out, with 35.5% under the age of 18, 7.7% from 18 to 24, 26.4% from 25 to 44, 20.6% from 45 to 64, and 9.8% who were 65 years of age or older. The median age was 30 years. For every 100 females, there were 84.5 males. For every 100 females age 18 and over, there were 94.9 males.

The median income for a household in the CDP was $28,750, and the median income for a family was $29,688. Males had a median income of $30,500 versus $16,250 for females. The per capita income for the CDP was $11,717. About 27.8% of families and 29.7% of the population were below the poverty line, including 32.5% of those under age 18 and 11.5% of those age 65 or over.

As of the census of 2020, there were 320 people, 132 households, 160 housing units in the CDP. The racial makeup of the CDP was 275 Whites, 3 American Indians, 2 Asians, 9 Hispanic or Latino, 9 Some Other Race, and 32 of Two or More Races.

The median income for a household in the CDP was $60,893, and the median income for a family was $61,964. About 5.7% of the population were below the poverty line, including 6.3% of those under age 18 and 7.6% of those age 65 or over.

== Recreation ==
The area surrounding the town of Klickitat and the river which shares its name are renowned for their seasonal hunting and fishing. During summer, popular activities on the Klickitat River include recreational drift boating, kayaking, and rafting. Paths and trails provide opportunities for scenic hikes. The 31-mile-long (50 km) Klickitat Trail is on the route of the former railroad tracks, now a biking and hiking trail. The trail follows the Klickitat River north from the Columbia River past the town of Klickitat. Washington State Route 142 provides a scenic drive through the canyon. Two miles east of town is the ruins of the dry ice plant with a single remaining building. The site is now a public campsite.

== See also ==
- List of census-designated places in Washington
