= 2025 Washington wildfires =

Natural disasters in the USA

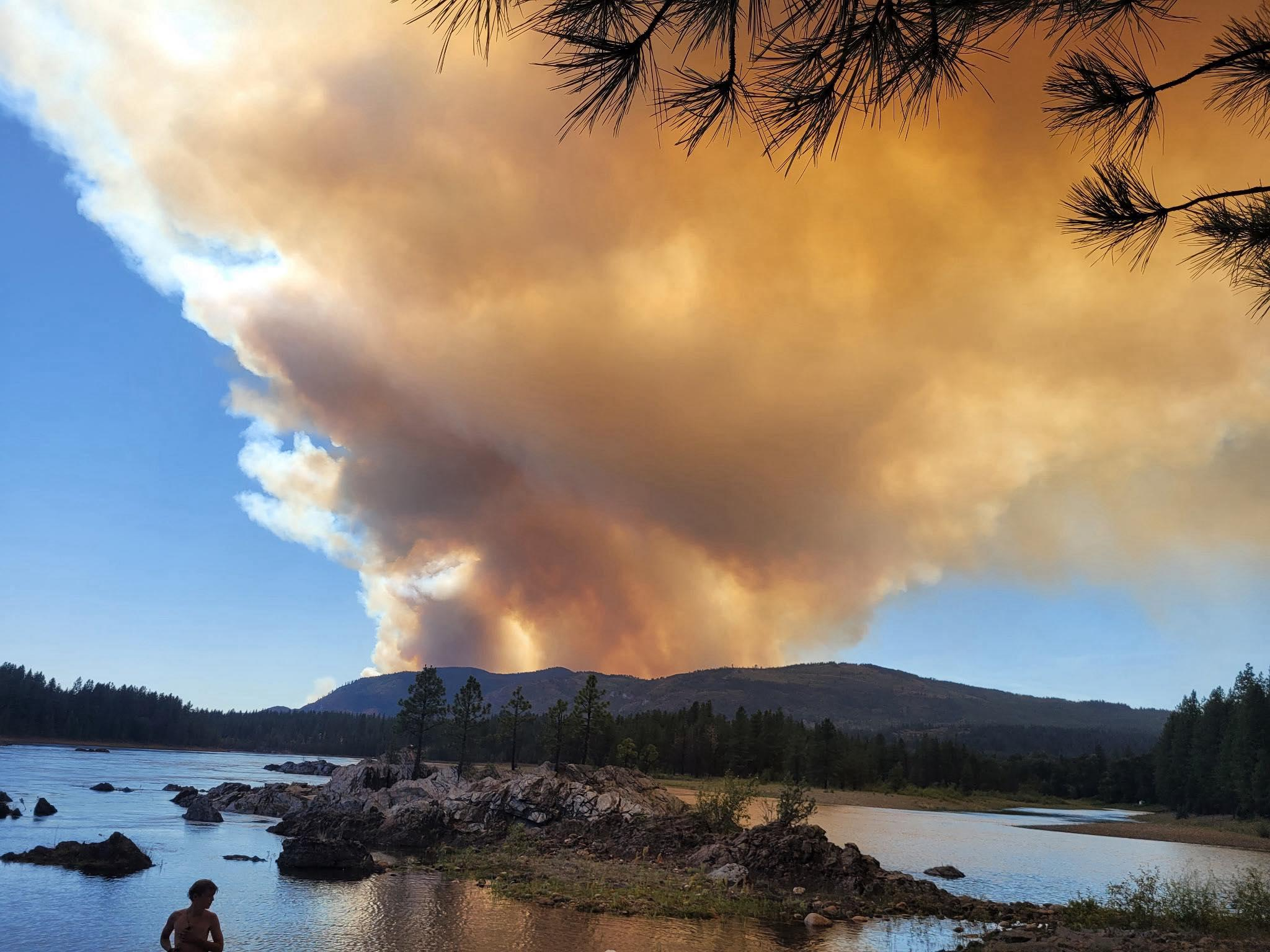
- Hope Fire smoke plume over the Columbia River
- Date: c. June 8, 2025 – October 27, 2025

The 2025 Washington wildfire season was a series of wildfires in the U.S. state of Washington.

== Background ==
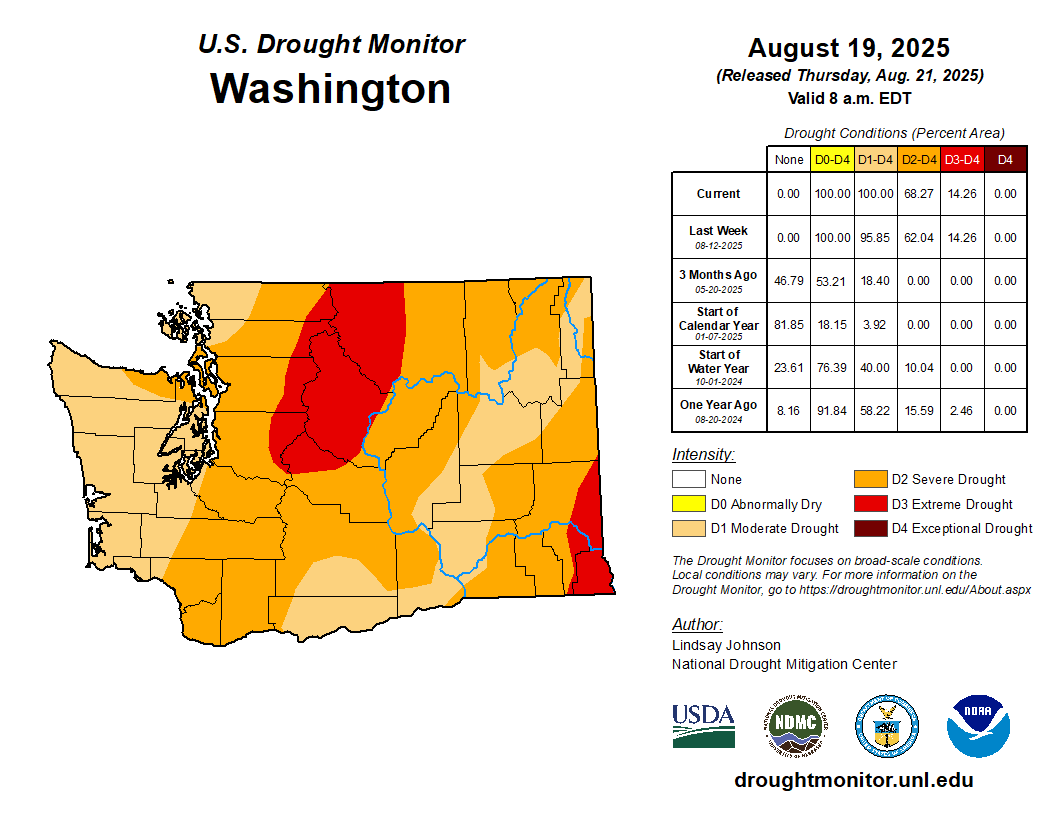
Washington Drought Monitor on August 19, 2025

While the typical "fire season" in Washington varies every year based on weather conditions, most wildfires occur in between July and October. However, hotter, drier conditions can allow wildfires to start outside of the typical fire period. Wildfires are most prevalent between July and October, as moisture from winter and spring precipitation dries up. Vegetation is abundant during these periods while overall conditions are typically the hottest and driest. The increase of vegetation (fuel) and reduced moisture levels can make the fires spread easier.

== Events ==
Predictions for the 2025 fire season made by the National Interagency Fire Center in May 2025 included above normal fire danger across the entire state of Washington by August, one of only two U.S. states so predicted (the other was Oregon). The Washington State Department of Natural Resources stated that the 2025 fire season could begin as soon as June.

The Red Bridge Fire near Cle Elum burned 60 acres (24 ha) by June 9, including two structures. Immediate evacuations were ordered on June 9.

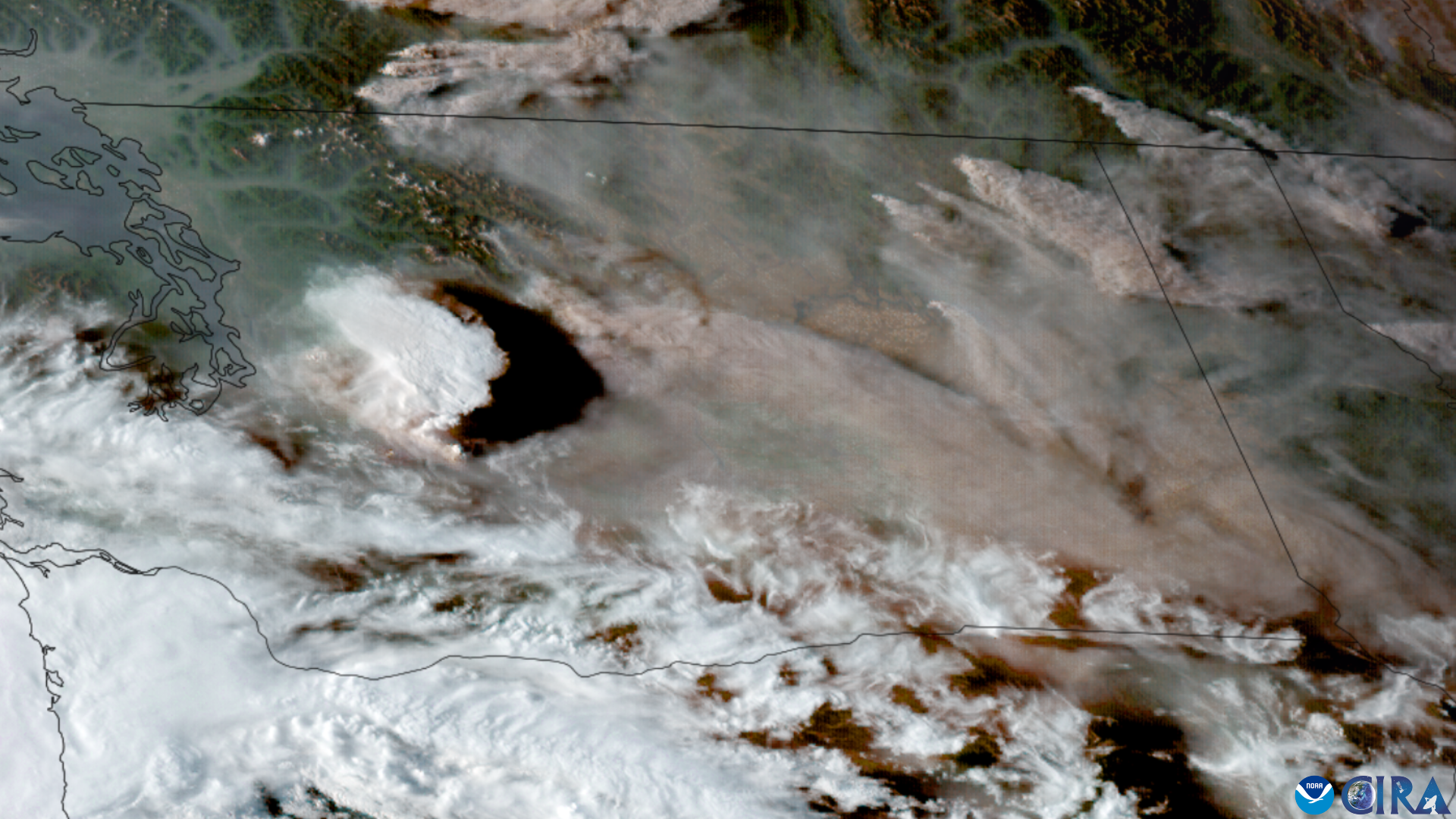
Pyrocumulonimbus cloud from the Lower Sugarloaf fire in Washington on September 4

A fire in the Tumwater Canyon of the Wenatchee River closed U.S. Highway 2 on June 10.

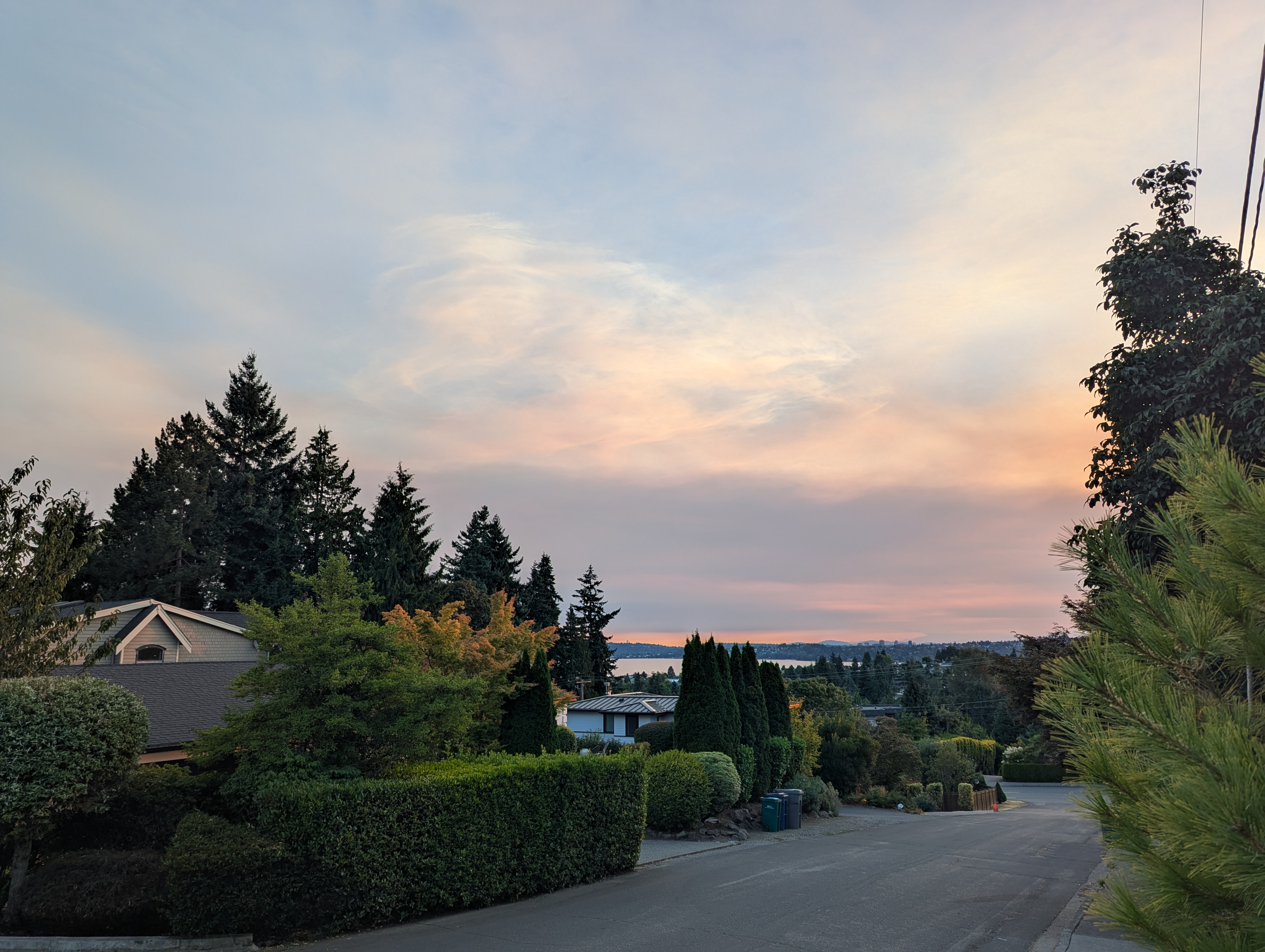
Smoke from the Bear Gulch Fire on the Olympic Peninsula, visible on August 12, 2025 over Seattle and obscuring the Olympic Mountains

"Go now" evacuations from Copper Creek/Staircase area due to Bear Gulch Fire were ordered on July 30. Staircase Campground was ordered evacuated on July 31. Haze from the fire reached Seattle and other Puget Sound communities the same week. The fire caused unhealthy air conditions in Bellevue on August 4. On August 12, the fire caused pyrocumulus clouds to form, and darkened the skies around the central Puget Sound area, including Seattle. The pyrocumulus cloud above the fire was visible from Seattle to Aberdeen on the Pacific coast.

In late August, a series of lightning-caused fires hit northeastern Washington. The largest of these fires, the Crown Creek Fire, near Northport, Washington in Stevens County grew to more than 3,000 acres without containment as of September 2nd, 2025.

Between September 5–7, fourteen fires burned in both Western Washington and Eastern Washington, four of them larger than 10,000 acres, causing poor air quality across the state. Air quality was unhealthy in Colville, and a "smokestorm" on September 5 caused "extraordinarily unhealthy" conditions north and east of Seattle, with the highest value of particulates ever recorded in Lake Forest Park, a Seattle suburb: 300 micrograms per cubic meter.

By September 10, 133,200 acres had burned in wildfires, and 13 fires were still active.

Blewett Pass was closed on September 21 and reopened on October 7 due to the Labor Mountain Fire.

The season was declared over by October 27 by the Washington Department of Natural Resources.

== List of wildfires ==
The following is a list of fires that burned more than 1,000 acres (400 ha), or produced significant structural damage or casualties.

Name	County	Acres	Start date	Containment date (Note: Containment means that fire crews have established and secured control lines around the fire's perimeter. These lines are artificial barriers, like trenches or cleared vegetation, designed to stop the fire's spread, or natural barriers like rivers. Containment reflects progress in managing the fire but does not necessarily mean the fire is starved of fuel, under control, or put out.)	Notes	Ref
Firewater	Yakima	3,820	June 8	June 9		
Vansycle Canyon	Walla Walla	2,026	June 12	June 14		
Pomas	Chelan	3,618	June 13	December 15	Lightning-caused. Burned about 36 miles (58 km) northwest of Entiat.	
Barstow	Walla Walla	1,543	June 22	June 25	Burned in brush and grass, and threatened crops near Prescott.	
Apple Acres	Chelan	3,410	July 2	October 17	Human-caused. Burned 5 miles (8.0 km) south of Pateros. Restricted U.S. Route 97 to alternating traffic.	
Bear Gulch	Mason	20,000	July 6	November 12	Human-caused, near Lake Cushman	
Hope	Stevens	8,177	July 8	August 9	Under investigation. Burned 10 mi (16 km) SW of Northport	
Western Pines	Lincoln	5,781	July 9	July 18	Human-caused. Burned 10 miles (16 km) north of Davenport. Destroyed 21 homes and 26 outbuildings.	
Boundary Road	Yakima	1,210	July 15	July 17	Human-caused. Burned 30 miles (48 km) southeast of Toppenish.	
Burdoin	Klickitat	10,675	July 18	August 9	Undetermined cause. Burned 5 miles (8.0 km) west of Lyle and destroyed numerous residential structures.	
Lake Spokane	Stevens	2,550	July 18	July 30	Human-caused. Burned north of Spokane near Spokane Lake and U.S. Route 395. Two residential structures burned as of July 22	
Central Ferry	Whitman	6,597	August 13	August 17	Caused by a motorhome fire. Burned 26 miles (42 km) west of Pullman and prompting Level 2 evacuations. Closed State Route 127.	
Wildcat	Yakima	10,940	August 25	October 25	East of Mount Rainier National Park, in the William O. Douglas Wilderness – ignited by lightning on August 25 and grew slowly until August 30	
Perry	Whatcom	1,772	August 27	February 23, 2026	Lightning caused; above Ross Lake	
Crown Creek Complex	Stevens	14,192	August 29	November 13	First treated as a complex of three fires approximately 1 mi (1.6 km) southeast of Marble, Washington; Includes the combined Crown Creek and Blackhawk Mountain Fire. Katy Creek split off and treated as a separate incident Started by a lightning storm.	
Katy Creek	Ferry	4,680	August 30	November 4	Lightning caused; 6 mi (9.7 km) northwest of Kettle Falls, Washington. Seen by same command group as the Crown Creek Complex.	
Lower Sugarloaf	Chelan	42,980	September 1	Unknown	Twelve miles north of Leavenworth; expanded from 100 acres to 6,222 overnight and caused evacuations on September 4 and beyond. 99% contained on October 19.	
Rattlesnake	Ferry	21,845	September 1	Unknown	2 mi (3.2 km) west of Seven Bays. Started by lightning. 96% contained on December 22.	
Labor Mountain	Kittitas	42,967	September 1	Unknown	Lightning-caused. Burning 10 mi (16 km) north of Cle Elum. Closing parts of Okanogan-Wenatchee National Forest. 97% contained on November 13.	
Tacoma Creek	Stevens	3,961	September 1	October 24	Lightning-caused, burned 15 mi (24 km) north of Cusick.	
Snow Peak	Ferry	1,174	September 1	October 23	Lightning-caused. Burned 19 miles (31 km) west of Kettle Falls in inaccessible terrain.	
Lynx Mountain	Ferry	9,226	September 2	December 22, 2025	7 mi (11 km) northwest of Inchelium. Human-caused.	
Wooden Road	Walla Walla	4,905	September 8	September 11	Unknown cause. 15 mi (24 km) north of Eureka and prompted Level 1 "Get Ready" evacuations.	

Perimeters of 2025 Washington wildfires (map data)
