= Lavina Washines =

Yakama leader (1940–2011)

First female leader of the Yakama Nation leader

Personal details
- Born: April 1, 1940
- Died: June 2, 2011 (aged 71)

Lavina Washines (April 1, 1940 – June 2, 2011) was the first female leader of the Yakama Nation, Washington, United States.

Washines was first elected to the Yakama Nation Tribal Council in 1985. In 2006, she became chair of the tribal council, serving until 2008.

She was "a respected elder of the Kah-milt-pah, known as the Rock Creek band from an area south of Goldendale along the Columbia River." She spoke several Yakima dialects and was "a tireless advocate for her tribe’s treaty rights and sovereignty."

== Political career ==
Washines was active among tribal affairs and was elected to the council in 1985.

Washines served as chair of the tribe from 2006 to 2008. In 2007, she celebrated the tribe, with the help of the Trust for Public Land, purchasing land at Lyle Point, where the Klickitat River flows into the Columbia. The Yakama call it Nanainmi Waki Uulktt, "the place where the wind blows from two directions."

The tribe traditionally dried salmon here and needed access to the rivers for fishing. It had become popular among windsurfers, and private owners wanted to develop a gated community, which would have been closed to the Yakama.

She said:

"This is a great day for the Yakamas -- to get the land returned back for access to our fishing right areas. The younger generation will continue to exercise their Creator-given right to our very important salmon. The U.S. government promised us with their honorable word to uphold their trust responsibility. All Yakamas will benefit with this accomplishment by the current Tribal Council officials."

In 2007, Washines spoke about an ongoing lawsuit by the Yakama Nation regarding the Hanford Nuclear Site Cleanup. "The tribe had sued the U.S. Department of Energy in 2002, seeking restoration of soil, water, plant and animal life that may have been damaged by radioactive waste and other hazardous releases at the south-central Washington site. The Nez Perce Tribe later joined the lawsuit, as did Washington and Oregon.

Lavina Washines, Yakama Nation chairwoman, said in a statement that recovery of those costs is absolutely essential in a case this size. "These injury studies are so expensive that a government must know at the onset it can recover them from the polluter," she said. "Now we will be able to do the studies necessary to understand the full extent of the harm done by Hanford."

Also in 2007, she attended a re-enactment of the handshake "Huckleberry Treaty", held near Surprise Lake in the Gifford Pinchot National Forest.
