= Washington State Route 142 =

State highway in Klickitat County, Washington, US

State Route 142
- SR 142 highlighted in red

Route information
- Auxiliary route of SR 14
- Maintained by WSDOT
- Length: 35.24 mi (56.71 km)
- Existed: 1965–present

Major junctions
- West end: SR 14 in Lyle
- East end: US 97 in Goldendale

Location
- Country: United States
- State: Washington
- Counties: Klickitat

Highway system
- State highways in Washington; Interstate; US; State; Scenic; Pre-1964; 1964 renumbering; Former
← SR 141	→ SR 150

State Route 142 (SR 142) is a state highway in southern Washington. It is located entirely within Klickitat County and runs east–west for 35 miles (56 km) from Lyle to Goldendale. The highway terminates at SR 14 in Lyle and U.S. Route 97 (US 97) in Goldendale.

The highway follows the Klickitat River and an abandoned railroad grade that was built in 1903 and converted into a recreational trail in the 1990s. The county government built a road through the Klickitat River Canyon in 1934 and transferred it to state control in the 1960s, when it was designated as Secondary State Highway 8E (SSH 8E). The highway was initially renumbered to SR 122, but instead became SR 142 in 1967.

== Route description ==
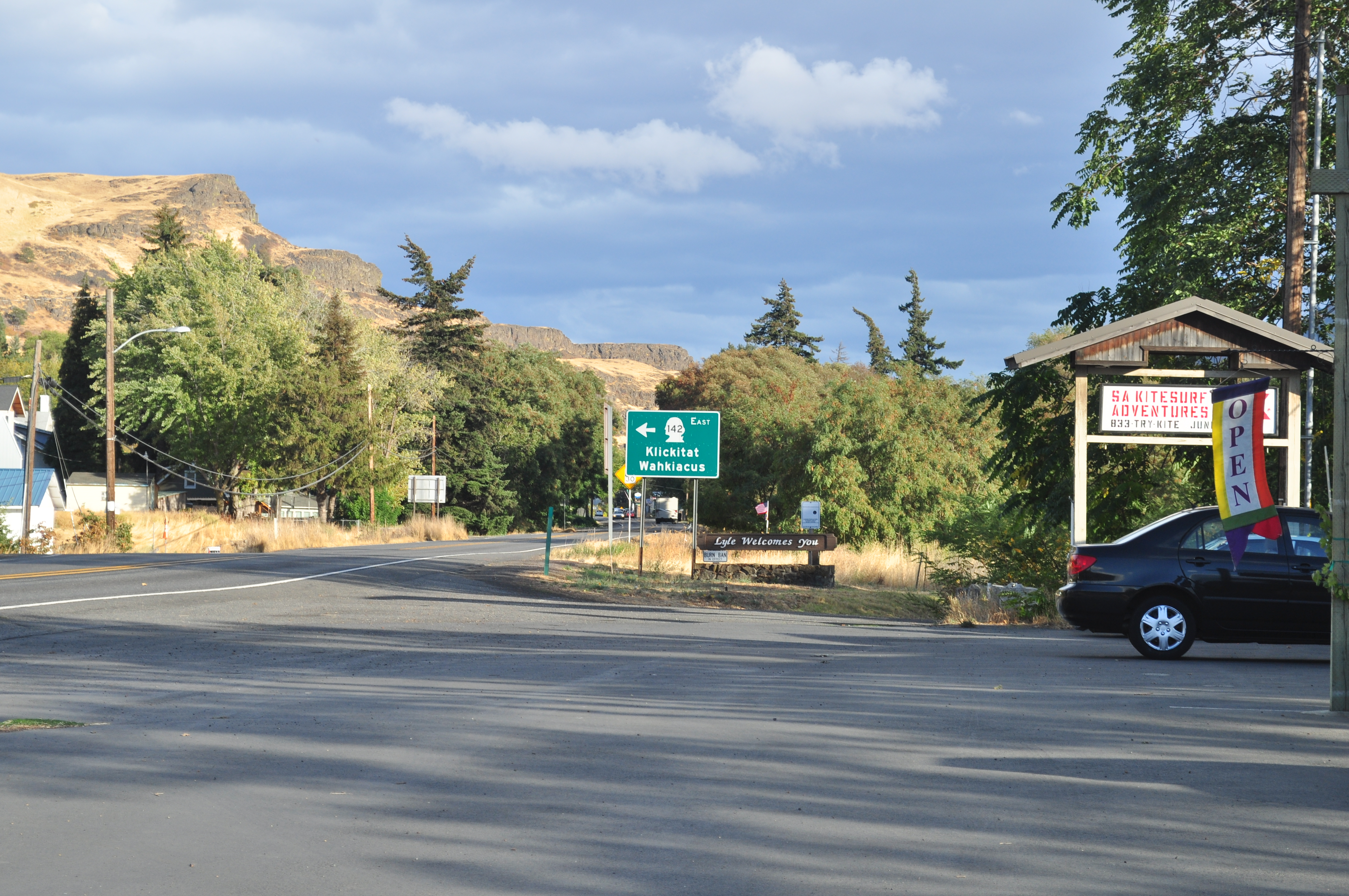
The western terminus of SR 142, at an intersection with SR 14 in Lyle

SR 142 begins at an intersection with SR 14 in the town of Lyle, located on the north bank of the Columbia River. The highway travels along the west side of Lyle, following the Klickitat River upstream as it passes through the Mud Spring Canyon, and passes Klickitat County Park. The two-lane, high-speed road is also paralleled to the west by the Klickitat Trail, a multi-use path for bicycles and pedestrians that uses an abandoned railroad grade. SR 142 continues to traverse several canyons, making several bends to the east and north to follow the course of the Klickitat River. The highway crosses over the river near Wheeler Canyon and continues along its west bank to the town of Klickitat, where it serves as the main street.

Beyond Klickitat, the highway turns east and travels along the north bank of the Klickitat River as it enters the Klickitat State Wildlife Area. After passing the settlement of Wahkiacus, SR 142 crosses over the river to its south bank and leaves the canyon by following the Little Klickitat River. The highway makes a hairpin turn to the north along Bowman Creek before reaching the rural Klickitat Valley plateau, high above the Little Klickitat River. SR 142 then travels north and makes a sharp turn to the east near Mountain View Ranch Road, followed by a series of stair-step turns around Blockhouse Butte before continuing east. The highway approaches Goldendale and passes the municipal airport and the county fairgrounds on the western outskirts of the city. After crossing the Little Klickitat River, SR 142 travels east through downtown Goldendale on Broadway Street. The highway turns northeast and terminates at an intersection with US 97 east of the city limits.

SR 142 is maintained by the Washington State Department of Transportation (WSDOT) and primarily serves as an alternative route between SR 14 and US 97, avoiding the Maryhill junction, as well as a local connector. The entire highway is also designated as a state scenic byway due to its proximity to recreational hunting, fishing, and watersports. WSDOT conducts an annual survey of average traffic volume on the state highway system that is measured in terms of annual average daily traffic. Daily traffic volumes on SR 142 range from a minimum of 360 vehicles near the Mountain View Ranch to a maximum of 4,200 vehicles in downtown Goldendale.

== History ==
The Columbia River and Northern Railway began construction of a 42-mile (68 km) railroad in 1902 with the goal of connecting Goldendale to a port on the Columbia River at Lyle. The railroad was completed in April 1903, on a route following the Klickitat River Canyon to Wahkiacus and Swale Creek before reaching the southern outskirts of Goldendale. The Lyle–Goldendale railroad was acquired by the Spokane, Portland and Seattle Railway Company in 1908 and used as a branch of the company's mainline on the northern bank of the Columbia River. The Lyle–Goldendale railroad was abandoned in 1992 and the riverside section was converted into a rail trail, today known as the Klickitat Trail, under the direction of the state parks system.

A highway linking Lyle to Goldendale was constructed by the Klickitat county government in 1934, requiring a series of timber truss bridges to traverse the Klickitat River. The eastern section of the highway, from Wahkiacus to Goldendale, was routed along the Little Klickitat River and a series of country roads on the western outskirts of Goldendale. The timber truss bridges, located northeast of Wahkiacus, were replaced in 1955 by a pair of prestressed concrete spans that demonstrated an early use of the new technology. The new bridges were designed by engineer Harry R. Powell and were the largest prestressed concrete bridges in the state at the time of their opening. The shorter bridge on the west side was replaced after a major flood in 1975 caused significant damage, while the longer bridge on the east side was closed to vehicular traffic in June 2012. A temporary Bailey bridge was erected until the completion of a permanent replacement for the eastern bridge in November 2016.

The state legislature approved a provisional designation for the Lyle–Goldendale highway, Secondary State Highway 8E (SSH 8E), in 1961 that would be activated upon the completion of Primary State Highway 8 (PSH 8) between Goldendale and Plymouth. SSH 8E was formally added to the state highway system in 1965, during the planned transition to a new numbering system that would take full effect in 1970. Under the new system, SSH 8E became State Route 122 (SR 122), while PSH 8 became SR 12. The extension of US 12 across Washington in 1967 caused SR 12 to be renumbered to SR 14, and SR 122 became SR 142 as a result.

== Major intersections ==
The entire highway is in Klickitat County.

Location	mi	km	Destinations	Notes
Lyle	0.00	0.00	SR 14 (Lewis and Clark Highway) – Vancouver, Kennewick	Western terminus
Goldendale	35.24	56.71	US 97 – Yakima, Vancouver, Bend	Eastern terminus
1.000 mi = 1.609 km; 1.000 km = 0.621 mi
