= Porter Lainhart =

American football player (1907–1991)

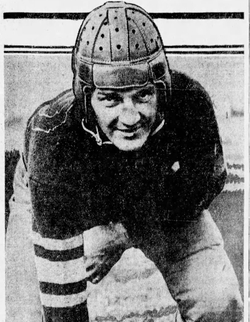

No. 18
- Position: Quarterback

Personal information
- Born: November 6, 1907; Goldendale, Washington, U.S.
- Died: August 18, 1991 (aged 83); Coquille, Oregon, U.S.
- Listed height: 6 ft 0 in (1.83 m)
- Listed weight: 180 lb (82 kg)

Career information
- High school: Goldendale
- College: Washington State

Career history
- Chicago Cardinals (1933)*; Philadelphia Eagles (1933)
- * Offseason or practice squad member only
- Stats at Pro Football Reference

Porter Ward Lainhart (November 6, 1907 – August 18, 1991) was an American professional football player who was a quarterback for one season with the Philadelphia Eagles of the National Football League (NFL) in 1933. He played college football for the Washington State Cougars.

== Early life and college ==
Porter Ward Lainhart was on November 6, 1907, in Goldendale, Washington. He attended Goldendale High School in Goldendale.

Lainhart played college football for the Cougars of Washington State University. He was on the freshman team in 1927 and was a three-year letterman from 1928 to 1930. He also participated in track and baseball at Washington State.

== Professional career ==
Lainhart signed with the NFL's Chicago Cardinals in 1933. However, he was later released.

Lainhart was then signed by the Philadelphia Eagles and played in one game for them during the team's inaugural 1933 season, catching one pass for 20 yards. He wore jersey number 18 while with the Eagles. He stood 6'0" and weighed 180 pounds.

== Personal life ==
Lainhart served in the United States Army during World War II. He died on August 18, 1991, in Coquille, Oregon.
