= Klickitat Trail =

31-mile rail trail in Klickitat County, Washington

Coordinates: 45°44′55.3″N 121°13′26.7″W

- Length: 31.0 miles (49.9 km)
- Location: Klickitat County, Washington
- Began construction: 2003
- Use: Cycling, Hiking
- Season: Swale Canyon section closed during fire season
- Right of way: Public
- Maintained by: USFS, WA State Parks, Klickitat Trail Conservancy

The Klickitat Trail is a 31-mile (50 km) rail trail along the Klickitat River in southern Washington in the Columbia River Gorge. The cycling and hiking trail offers river and canyon views throughout its length. It follows an old railroad corridor that at one time linked the towns of Lyle and Goldendale.

== Route ==
The trail consists of two sections; one along the Klickitat river, from Lyle to Swale Canyon, and the remainder which continues through Swale Canyon to Warwick. The Swale Canyon section is closed during fire season, approximately July 1 - October 1.

== Geology and biology ==
The route includes a remote tributary canyon, a nationally designated Wild & Scenic River and a National Scenic Area. The wildlife in the area includes wild turkeys, rattlesnakes and cougars. Deer kills on the trail by cougars are common, and yearly salmon runs attract bald eagles.

== History ==
The region was originally passed through by the Lewis and Clark Expedition, with Lewis and Clark calling the Klickitat river the "Cataract river". In 1903, the Spokane, Portland and Seattle Railway built the original track linking Lyle and Goldendale. Passenger service existed for several years during the 1920s between Portland, Oregon, and Goldendale, Washington. Lumber was an important part of its transport until the 1980s. It was abandoned in 1992 following the decline of the lumber mill in the town of Klickitat and the mill in Goldendale. The railroad right-of-way was purchased in 1993 by the national Rails-to-Trails Conservancy. Ownership of the rail line was transferred to Washington State Parks in 1994, despite some local opposition. In 2003, local supporters of the Trail formed the Klickitat Trail Conservancy (KTC).

The Klickitat Trail, a public right of way, is now managed cooperatively by Washington State, the U.S. Forest Service, and the KTC. In 2007–2008, the U.S. Forest Service completed its Trail management and development plan which includes a partnership with the Klicktitat Trail Conservancy (KTC) and Washington State Parks.
