= Wahkiacus, Washington =

Unincorporated community in Washington, United States

- Unincorporated community
- Location within Washington (state) Location within the United States
- Coordinates: 45°49′32″N 121°05′54″W
- Country: United States
- State: Washington
- County: Klickitat
- Elevation: 535 ft (163 m)
- Time zone: UTC-8 (Pacific (PST))
  - Summer (DST): UTC-7 (PDT)
- ZIP code: 98670
- Area code: 509
- GNIS feature ID: 1512767

Wahkiacus is an unincorporated community in Klickitat County, Washington, United States. Wahkiacus is located on Washington State Route 142 3 miles (4.8 km) east-northeast of Klickitat. Wahkiacus has a post office with ZIP code 98670.
