= Bear Gulch Fire =

2025 Washington wildfire

- Part of the 2025 Washington wildfires
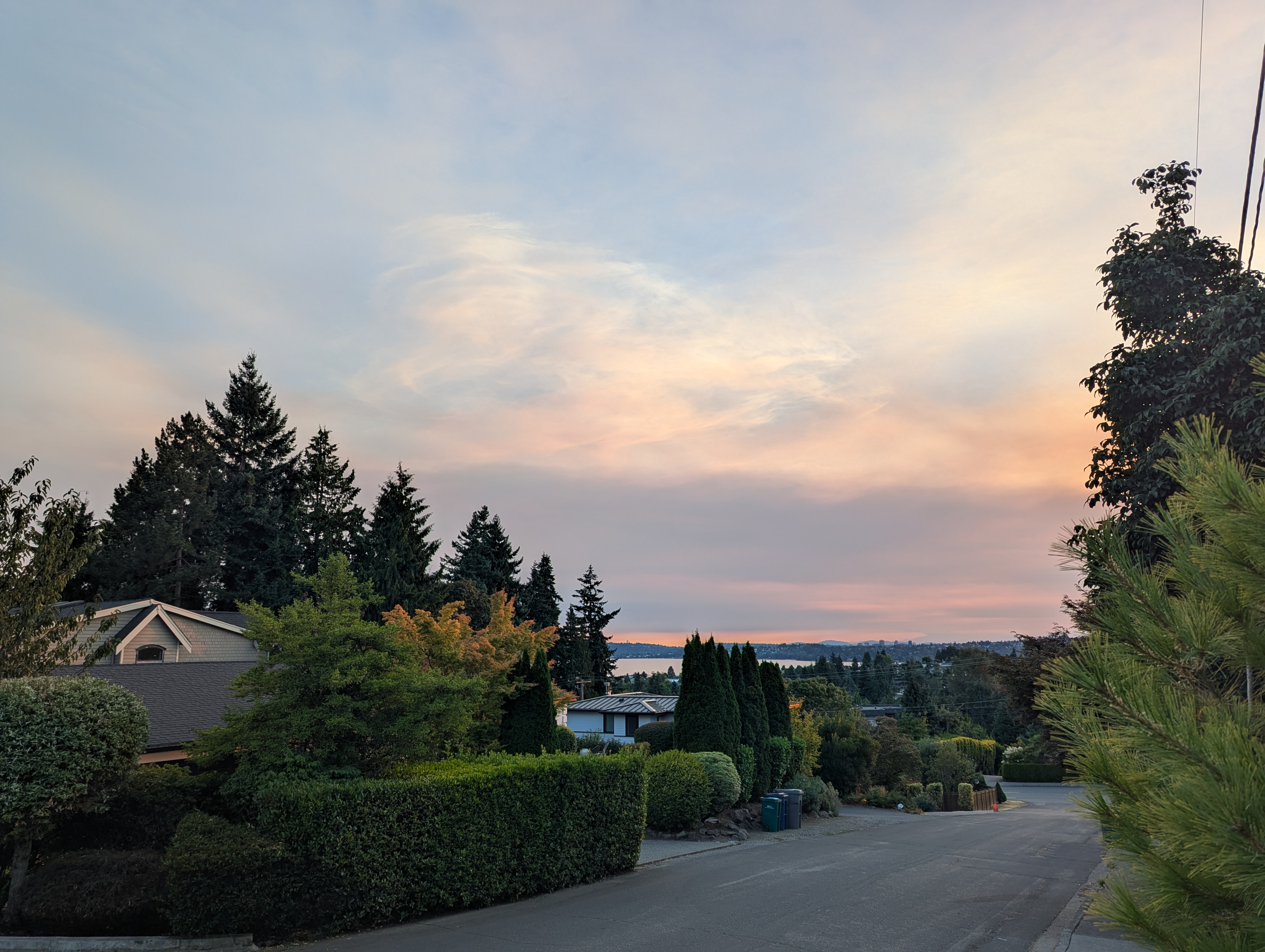
- Smoke from the Bear Gulch Fire on the Olympic Peninsula, visible on August 12 over Seattle and obscuring the Olympic Mountains
- Date: July 6, 2025 – November 12, 2025
- Location: Olympic National Forest, Mason County, Washington
- Coordinates: 47°29′45″N 123°18′08″W

Statistics
- Perimeter: 100% contained
- Burned area: 20,233 acres (8,188 ha; 81.88 km^{2})

Impacts
- Deaths: 0
- Injuries: 0
- Structures destroyed: 0
- Cost: $42.6 million

Ignition
- Cause: Human

The Bear Gulch Fire was a wildfire that began on July 6, 2025, on the north side of Lake Cushman near Mount Rose in the Olympic National Forest. It was the largest fire on the Olympic Peninsula since the Great Forks Fire in 1951. As of November 12, 2025, it had burned 20,233 acres (8,188 ha) and is 100% contained.

The fire was caused by human activity.

== Events ==
"Go now" evacuations from Copper Creek/Staircase Campground area due to Bear Gulch Fire were ordered on July 30. Staircase Campground was ordered evacuated on July 31. Haze from the fire reached Seattle and other Puget Sound communities the same week. The fire caused unhealthy air conditions in Bellevue on August 4. On August 12, the fire caused pyrocumulus clouds to form, and darkened the skies around the central Puget Sound area, including Seattle. The pyrocumulus cloud above the fire was visible from Whatcom County near Canada to Ocean Shores on the state's central Pacific coast.

Fire managers reported "wetting rains" beginning September 29 and expected to continue, that would mitigate risk of fire spread. Meteorologist Cliff Mass said the wet weather would "close out the fire season" around the beginning of October; the season was declared over on October 27 by the Washington Department of Natural Resources.

The fire was reported 100% contained on November 12.

Beginning trailhead, Staircase Rapids Loop Trail, after fire, 2026

Trail closure and damages, 2026

== Crew arrests ==
United States Department of Homeland Security officers arrested two firefighters during a U.S. Customs and Border Protection operation on August 27 as fire crews were setting up on Lake Cushman. One of the firefighters had applied for a U visa in the past, or a family member had done so on his behalf. He was released following a habeas corpus demand around September 24.

== Map ==
Perimeter of Bear Gulch Fire

== See also ==
- 2025 Washington wildfires
- List of Washington wildfires
- 2025 United States wildfires
