= Klickitat Mineral Springs =

Two miles east of Klickitat, Washington are the Klickitat Mineral Springs. CO_{2} seeps from crevices in the basalt rock formation, presumed to originate from Mt. Adams. As early as 1879 a stage driver named Ed Phillips made side trips from Goldendale, Washington on his route between The Dalles, Oregon and Ellensburg, Washington for the carbonated water. While excavating one of the springs it caved in on him and he found himself in a warm mineral bath. The Native Americans in the nearby Wahkiakus village were already well aware of warm mineral baths, having built sweat houses utilizing the warm, carbonated water.

Plans for a health spa gave way to a large bottling plant to supply Safeway with bottled water. However, although the bottled water was well liked it wasn't possible to keep the water clear and the bottles would soon go flat. After the owner, Mr. Langdon of Walla Walla, Washington, killed himself, in 1931 Raymond Newbern was sent by the Baker-Boyer Bank of Walla Walla to investigate the property to determine if it could be developed. Mr. Newbern concluded there was no future in mineral water and decided that there was a future in dry ice. Tests showed the CO_{2} was pure. Newbern took a 99-year lease on the property and formed the Gas-Ice Corporation. After 4 years and $200,000 of investment in plant equipment the company generated a small profit in 1936. Demand for dry ice grew, prompting more wells to be drilled and expansion of the facility. It eventually reached maximum production of 18 tons per day, limited by the available gas flow in the area. In 1957 Newbern expanded capacity in Kennewick, Washington where CO_{2} was a by-product of ammonia fertilizer production. In 1968 he sold his holdings and the Klickitat plant was closed. In 1972 the property was sold to the Washington State Department of Game. The main building of the dry ice plant complex has been retained as a sanctuary of swifts, which nest in the chimney.

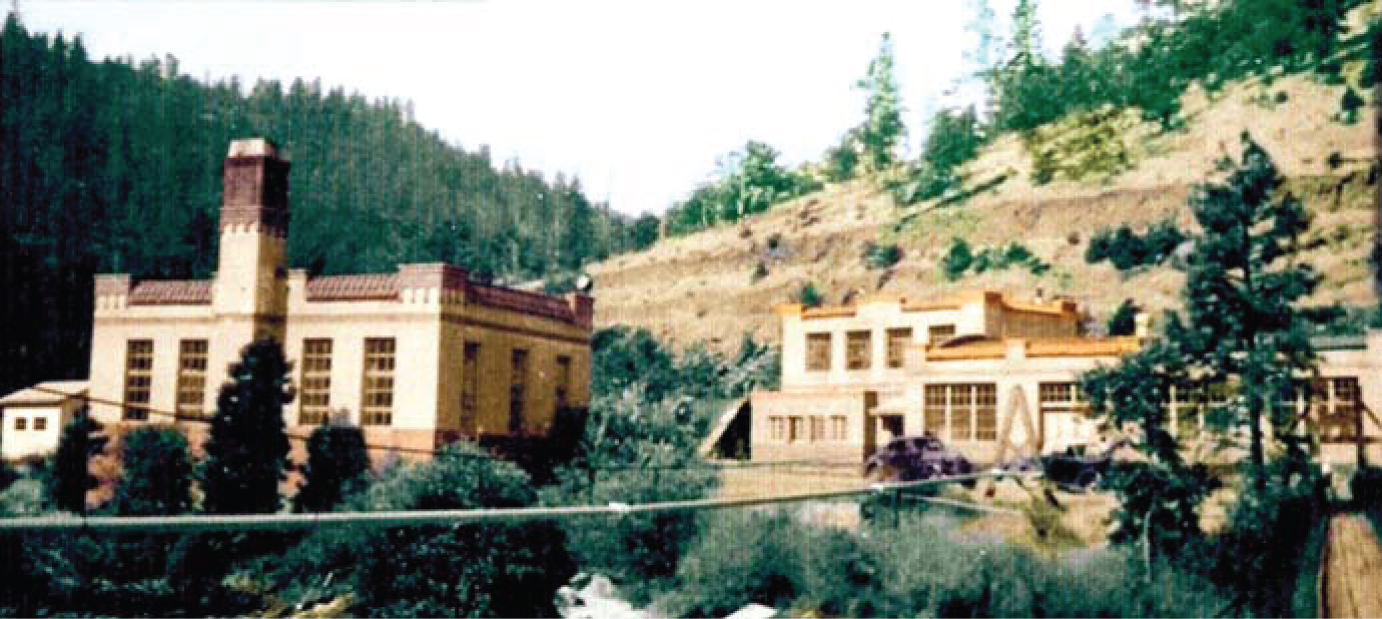
Gas-Ice Corporation plant located at the Klickitat Mineral Springs

== Current Use ==
The property is now a camp site operated by the Washington Department of Fish and Wildlife.
