= Outlet Falls =

Waterfall in Washington (state), United States

Coordinates: 46°01′03″N 121°10′25″W

Outlet Falls is a 69-foot plunge fed by Outlet Creek which flows out of farmland in Klickitat County, Washington. Its watercourse, Outlet Creek, is fed by several springfed tributaries and agricultural runoff (manure and fertilizer). The perennial drop is formed as Outlet Creek erodes into the 200-foot-deep Klickitat Canyon and hurtles itself into a huge bowl. It is located several miles east of the town of Glenwood.

== Nearby waterfalls ==
- Wonder Falls (Washington), 66 feet
