= Marble, Washington =

Unincorporated community in Washington, United States

- Unincorporated community
- Location within Washington (state)
- Coordinates: 48°50′57″N 117°54′06″W
- Country: United States
- State: Washington
- County: Stevens
- Elevation: 1,473 ft (449 m)
- Time zone: UTC-8 (Pacific (PST))
  - Summer (DST): UTC-7 (PDT)
- ZIP code: 99157
- Area code: 509
- GNIS feature ID: 1522700

Marble is an unincorporated community in Stevens County, in the U.S. state of Washington.

== History ==
A post office called Marble was established in 1897, and remained in operation until 1943. The community was named for marble near the original town site.

In the early 1990s, Barry and Ann Byrd founded the Marble Fellowship Community Church in the then-ghost town of Marble. It attracted newcomers from around the western United States. Residents were concerned that the newcomers at Marble were part of a cult. The church is associated with Christian Identity, an interpretation of Christianity considered by the Southern Poverty Law Center to be racist, antisemitic and white nationalist. The church's annual God and Country Celebration attracts influential figures from the radical right, many with clear ties to racist, antisemitic and white nationalist groups from the local, state and national levels.
