= Lyle, Washington =

- Census-designated place
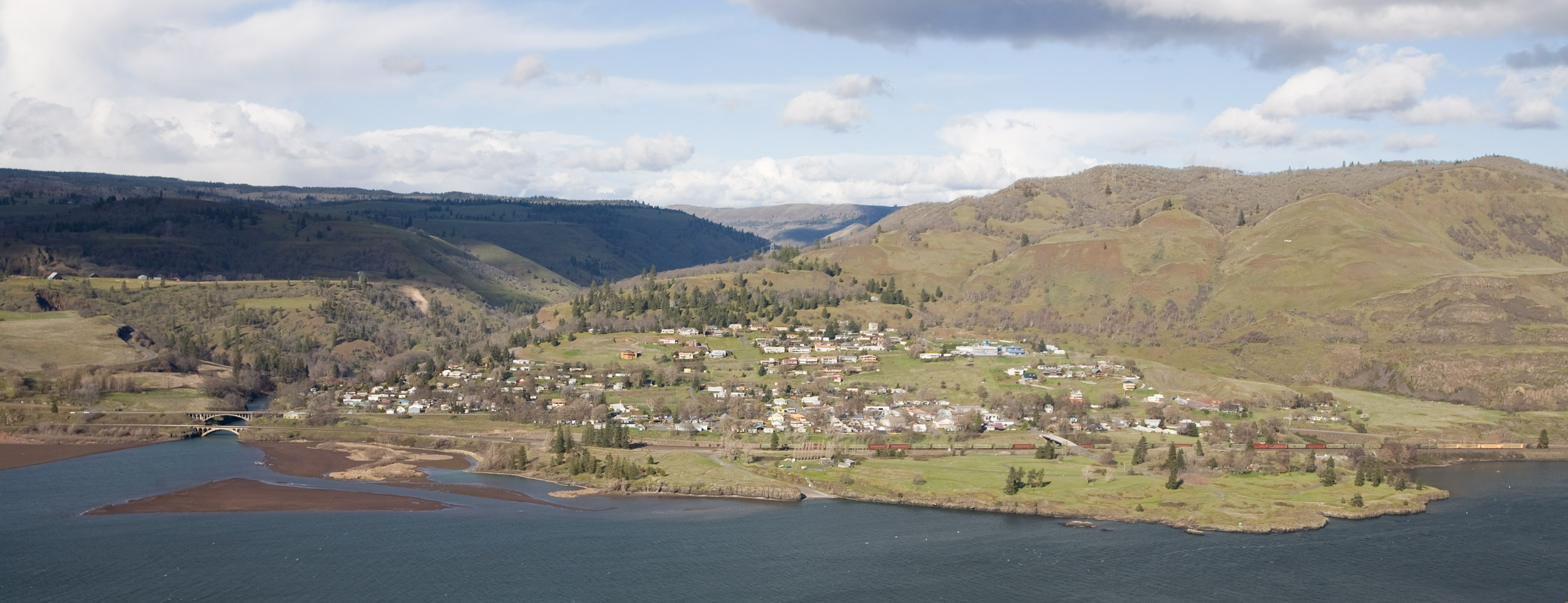
- Lyle as seen from Oregon

- Location of Lyle in Klickitat County, Washington
- Coordinates: 45°41′44″N 121°16′50″W
- Country: United States
- State: Washington
- County: Klickitat

Area
  - Total: 0.71 sq mi (1.83 km^{2})
  - Land: 0.71 sq mi (1.83 km^{2})
  - Water: 0 sq mi (0.0 km^{2})
- Elevation: 354 ft (108 m)

Population (2020)
  - Total: 518
  - Density: 733/sq mi (283/km^{2})
- Time zone: UTC-8 (Pacific (PST))
  - Summer (DST): UTC-7 (PDT)
- ZIP code: 98635
- Area code: 509
- FIPS code: 53-40735
- GNIS feature ID: 2408154

Lyle is an unincorporated community and census-designated place (CDP) in Klickitat County, Washington, United States. The population was 518 at the 2020 census.

== History ==
Established around 1859, the community was originally called "Klickitat Landing". The first European settler was Egbert French, who arrived from Ohio. In 1866, French sold his holdings to James O. Lyle from The Dalles, Oregon, who moved to the north bank of the Columbia River.

A post office was soon established with Lyle as one of the first postmasters, and with mail delivered by steamer from the opposite shore. Steamboat operation lasted until the North Shore Railroad was completed. When the Spokane, Portland and Seattle Railway came to town in 1908, its line passed somewhat north of the town. The present townsite was plotted in 1909, and the older townsite became known as "downtown". The nearest airport is 8.4 miles away in Dallesport, WA and was a grass strip in the early 1920s, then The U.S. Corps of Engineers built the current airfield in 1942 as a World War II training facility.

== Lyle today ==
Lyle has two main areas: that part which is built on the north bank of the Columbia River, including the downtown, and that part which is built on the hills above the river. The downtown area has one grocery store, two churches, a museum, a tavern, a restaurant/cafe, a gas station and vehicle repair shop, a second-hand store, an espresso stand, and a historic hotel with restaurant and bar.

Residential areas extend east and west of downtown. Newer homes have been built on terraces on the hill north of downtown. Fewer than six homes stood on the hill less than 30 years ago; it now has dozens. Many overlook the Columbia River.

Although Lyle is more than 70 miles (110 km) east of Portland/Vancouver, it is a bedroom community using freeway transportation on the Oregon side.

The Lyle Community Schools Campus includes three independent, small, rural schools: the area's elementary, middle school and high school, which incorporate students from Dallesport and Murdock (6 miles (10 km) east of Lyle). The campus is located at the northernmost part of town, high on the hill overlooking Lyle.

== Geography ==
Lyle is located in southwestern Klickitat County on the north side of the Columbia River where it is joined by the Klickitat River. State Route 14 passes through the town, leading 8 miles (13 km) east to Dallesport and a junction with U.S. Route 197, and 11 miles (18 km) west to White Salmon. Dallesport and White Salmon are the locations of the closest road crossings of the Columbia River to the east and west, respectively. In addition, State Route 142 travels from Lyle to Goldendale along the Klickitat River.

According to the United States Census Bureau, the Lyle CDP has a total area of 0.69 square miles (1.8 km^{2}), all of it land. Behind the town, most of the land consists of hills leading to a large plateau that is commonly found in south-central Washington.

=== Climate ===
This region experiences warm (but not hot) and dry summers, with no average monthly temperatures above 71.6 °F (22.0 °C). According to the Köppen Climate Classification system, Lyle has a warm-summer Mediterranean climate, abbreviated "Csb" on climate maps.

== Demographics ==
Historical population
Census	Pop.	Note	%±
2000	530		—
2010	499		−5.8%
2020	518		3.8%
U.S. Decennial Census; 1990 2000 2010 2020

Lyle first appeared as a census designated place in the 2000 U.S. census.

=== Racial and ethnic composition ===
Lyle CDP, Washington – Racial and ethnic composition Note: the US Census treats Hispanic/Latino as an ethnic category. This table excludes Latinos from the racial categories and assigns them to a separate category. Hispanics/Latinos may be of any race.
Race / Ethnicity (NH = Non-Hispanic)	Pop 2000	Pop 2010	Pop 2020	% 2000	% 2010	% 2020
White alone (NH)	449	455	408	84.72%	91.18%	78.76%
Black or African American alone (NH)	0	0	3	0.00%	0.00%	0.58%
Native American or Alaska Native alone (NH)	8	9	18	1.51%	1.80%	3.47%
Asian alone (NH)	5	3	1	0.94%	0.60%	0.19%
Native Hawaiian or Pacific Islander alone (NH)	2	1	3	0.38%	0.20%	0.58%
Other race alone (NH)	6	3	3	1.13%	0.60%	0.58%
Mixed race or Multiracial (NH)	20	11	43	3.77%	2.20%	8.30%
Hispanic or Latino (any race)	40	17	39	7.55%	3.41%	7.53%
Total	530	499	518	100.00%	100.00%	100.00%

=== 2000 census ===
As of the census of 2000, there were 530 people, 221 households, and 152 families residing in the CDP. The population density was 156.5 people per square mile (60.4/km^{2}). There were 260 housing units at an average density of 76.8/sq mi (29.6/km^{2}). The racial makeup of the CDP was 87.55% White, 1.89% Native American, 0.94% Asian, 0.38% Pacific Islander, 4.91% from other races, and 4.34% from two or more races. Hispanic or Latino of any race were 7.55% of the population.

There were 221 households, out of which 31.7% had children under the age of 18 living with them, 51.6% were married couples living together, 13.1% had a female householder with no husband present, and 30.8% were non-families. 25.8% of all households were made up of individuals, and 12.2% had someone living alone who was 65 years of age or older. The average household size was 2.34 and the average family size was 2.76.

In the CDP, the population was spread out, with 26.8% under the age of 18, 7.4% from 18 to 24, 25.1% from 25 to 44, 25.3% from 45 to 64, and 15.5% who were 65 years of age or older. The median age was 41 years. For every 100 females, there were 100.0 males. For every 100 females age 18 and over, there were 99.0 males.

The median income for a household in the CDP was $33,438, and the median income for a family was $40,083. Males had a median income of $37,292 versus $25,500 for females. The per capita income for the CDP was $17,355. About 8.1% of families and 11.6% of the population were below the poverty line, including 8.2% of those under age 18 and 20.6% of those age 65 or over.

== See also ==
- Lavina Washines
