= Goldendale, Washington =

Goldendale
- City
- Goldendale, Washington
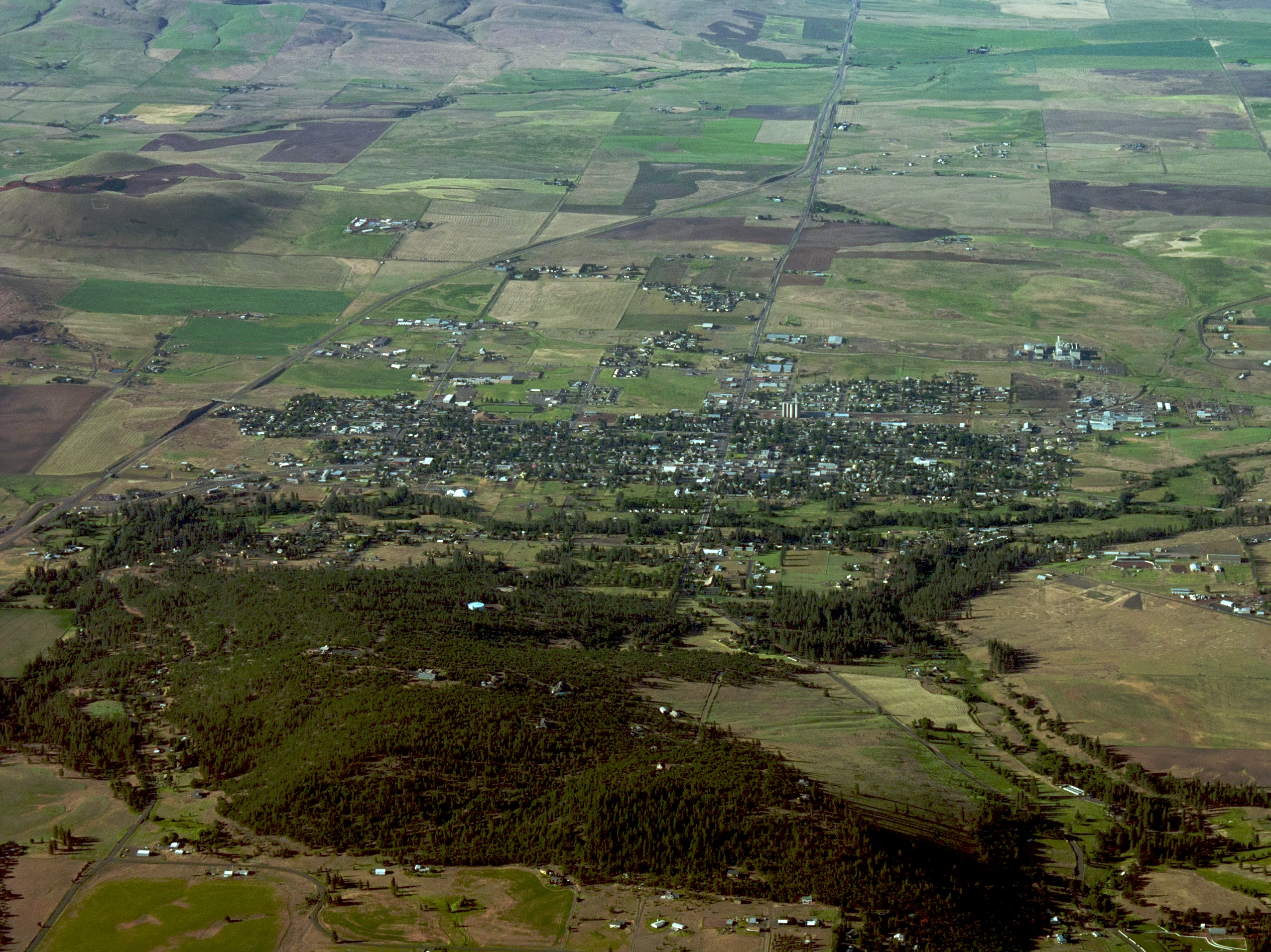
- Aerial view of Goldendale

- Coordinates: 45°49′09″N 120°49′24″W
- Country: United States
- State: Washington
- County: Klickitat

Government
  - Type: Mayor–council
  - Mayor: Dave Jones

Area
  - Total: 2.96 sq mi (7.67 km^{2})
  - Land: 2.96 sq mi (7.67 km^{2})
  - Water: 0 sq mi (0.00 km^{2})
- Elevation: 1,637 ft (499 m)

Population (2020)
  - Total: 3,453
  - Density: 1,170/sq mi (450/km^{2})
- Time zone: UTC-8 (Pacific (PST))
  - Summer (DST): UTC-7 (PDT)
- ZIP code: 98620
- Area code: 509
- FIPS code: 53-27435
- GNIS feature ID: 2410612
- Website: City of Goldendale

Goldendale is a city in and the county seat of Klickitat County, Washington, United States, near the Columbia River Gorge. As of the 2020 census, Goldendale had a population of 3,453. It is situated in a primarily agricultural area and is also near Goldendale Observatory State Park. The valley in which Goldendale is located offers views of the Cascade Mountains to the west and the Simcoe Mountains to the north.

== History ==
In 1859 the town was given its name by the early homesteader John Golden, a Pennsylvania-born farmer who settled with his wife from Oregon. His daughter's home at Columbus Street and Collins Street remains standing in downtown Goldendale. The town was designated as the county seat of Klickitat County in 1878. Goldendale was officially incorporated on November 14, 1879. Much of the young town, including the county courthouse, was destroyed in a devastating fire on May 13, 1888.

On June 9, 1918, William Wallace Campbell, director of the Lick Observatory, and astronomer Heber Curtis journeyed to Goldendale to view a total solar eclipse. The purpose of the observation was to photograph the Sun's corona and the apparent distorted placement of stars due to the Sun's gravitational pull on those star's rays while passing by the Sun. Lacking proper equipment and instead only using multiple cameras Campbell and Curtis were unable to confirm stars' deflection. However, by November 1919, their efforts would be vindicated by British astronomers and Einstein's Theory of Relativity was confirmed. Goldendale was also under the path of totality for another total eclipse on February 26, 1979, which drew thousands of visitors to the Goldendale Observatory.

In 2008 Goldendale hosted the International Gravity Sports Association's 'Festival of Speed,' on a segment of the historic Maryhill highway.

Goldendale has remained the employment, business, commercial and banking center for the valley and, as the county seat, is the location for Klickitat County's courts and government offices. In recent years this small community has suffered from severe economic decline. After a local aluminum plant that once employed many residents closed, the small community struggled economically. The loss of tax base has taken its toll on the funds available for maintaining the city's infrastructure. In recent years there has been an interest in installing wind turbines that would generate power. While it has provided some jobs, this industry has not been the economic solution for which many residents hoped.

== Geography ==
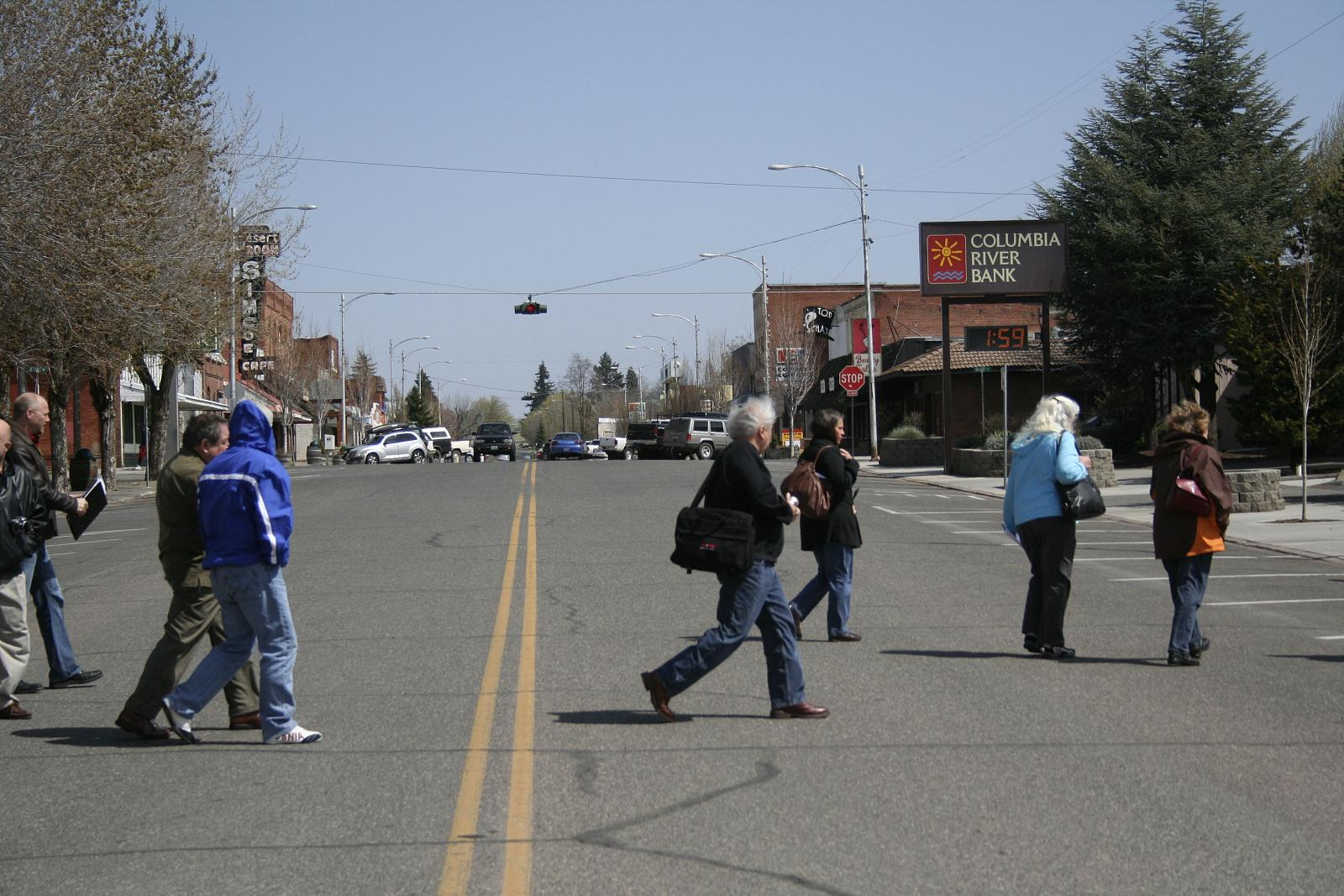
Main Street, Goldendale

According to the United States Census Bureau, the city has a total area of 2.52 square miles (6.53 km^{2}), all of it land.

Goldendale's elevation at the County Courthouse is 1,634 feet (498 meters).

The Little Klickitat River flows roughly east-to-west across the northern portion of the city. Bloodgood Creek, an entirely spring-fed year-round water source, runs through the northwest part of town and intersects with the Little Klickitat just west of the city. Both are sources of rainbow trout as well as being home to waterfowl such as the great blue heron and several species of duck. Bloodgood Creek provides a portion of Goldendale's drinking water and is capped at the source for that purpose.

U.S. Route 97 runs along the eastern boundary of the city and connects Goldendale with Interstate 84, 21 km (13 mi) south in the state of Oregon and State Route 14, which is 19 km (12 mi) south and runs along the Washington side of the Columbia River. State Route 142 creates a major east–west route through Goldendale, beginning at US 97 on the north end of town.

== Climate ==
Goldendale has a continental Mediterranean climate (Köppen Dsb). The rain shadow of the Cascades creates distinct and visible difference between the arid and dry areas south of the community, and the more lush treed areas to the north. This produces a landscape of open bunch-grass prairies dotted with sagebrush and rabbit brush containing the occasional juniper tree, while the more sheltered areas consist of ponderosa pine and oak savannahs.

Overcast days are rare, occurring mostly in late fall and throughout winter. Summer temperatures can reach well over 100 °F or 37.8 °C, while winter, when most of the annual precipitation of around 17 inches or 430 millimetres occurs, can see temperatures below 0 °F or −17.8 °C, particularly in January. Summer thunderstorms occur intermittently, particularly in July and August, but due to high cloud bases, rain seldom reaches the ground in any appreciable amount. Lightning-caused range and forest fires are a common occurrence during this time of year. Spring flowers and green meadows and prairies make Goldendale a particularly beautiful site. Spring and summer can be very blustery since the Chinook winds off the Pacific Ocean are funneled through the Columbia Gorge. Fall tends to be almost windless, and the autumnal oak leaves add a lovely touch of golden rust red to Observatory Hill on the north side of town.

Climate data for Goldendale, Washington (1991–2020 normals, extremes 1895–2022)
Month	Jan	Feb	Mar	Apr	May	Jun	Jul	Aug	Sep	Oct	Nov	Dec	Year
Record high °F (°C)	66 (19)	72 (22)	80 (27)	91 (33)	102 (39)	113 (45)	110 (43)	108 (42)	103 (39)	89 (32)	71 (22)	64 (18)	113 (45)
Mean maximum °F (°C)	54.4 (12.4)	56.8 (13.8)	66.2 (19.0)	75.8 (24.3)	87.2 (30.7)	93.5 (34.2)	101.3 (38.5)	100.8 (38.2)	93.7 (34.3)	79.4 (26.3)	62.9 (17.2)	52.7 (11.5)	103.0 (39.4)
Mean daily maximum °F (°C)	37.9 (3.3)	44.0 (6.7)	51.8 (11.0)	59.2 (15.1)	68.7 (20.4)	75.6 (24.2)	86.1 (30.1)	86.1 (30.1)	77.3 (25.2)	62.2 (16.8)	46.8 (8.2)	36.9 (2.7)	61.0 (16.1)
Daily mean °F (°C)	30.9 (−0.6)	34.5 (1.4)	40.5 (4.7)	45.9 (7.7)	54.0 (12.2)	60.1 (15.6)	67.9 (19.9)	67.6 (19.8)	59.5 (15.3)	47.9 (8.8)	37.3 (2.9)	30.4 (−0.9)	48.0 (8.9)
Mean daily minimum °F (°C)	23.9 (−4.5)	25.1 (−3.8)	29.1 (−1.6)	32.7 (0.4)	39.3 (4.1)	44.6 (7.0)	49.7 (9.8)	49.2 (9.6)	41.6 (5.3)	33.6 (0.9)	27.8 (−2.3)	23.8 (−4.6)	35.0 (1.7)
Mean minimum °F (°C)	9.0 (−12.8)	12.6 (−10.8)	19.0 (−7.2)	23.3 (−4.8)	28.2 (−2.1)	34.5 (1.4)	39.7 (4.3)	39.3 (4.1)	31.5 (−0.3)	21.2 (−6.0)	14.4 (−9.8)	10.1 (−12.2)	1.2 (−17.1)
Record low °F (°C)	−26 (−32)	−17 (−27)	−4 (−20)	16 (−9)	20 (−7)	20 (−7)	31 (−1)	28 (−2)	19 (−7)	6 (−14)	−12 (−24)	−18 (−28)	−26 (−32)
Average precipitation inches (mm)	2.75 (70)	1.78 (45)	1.61 (41)	1.09 (28)	1.04 (26)	0.55 (14)	0.12 (3.0)	0.15 (3.8)	0.44 (11)	1.36 (35)	2.43 (62)	3.18 (81)	16.50 (419)
Average snowfall inches (cm)	10.2 (26)	3.5 (8.9)	0.6 (1.5)	0.0 (0.0)	0.0 (0.0)	0.0 (0.0)	0.0 (0.0)	0.0 (0.0)	0.0 (0.0)	0.0 (0.0)	2.7 (6.9)	9.6 (24)	26.6 (68)
Average precipitation days (≥ 0.01 in)	14.1	11.3	11.1	8.5	8.0	3.7	1.3	1.8	3.5	9.7	13.4	14.7	101.1
Average snowy days (≥ 0.1 in)	5.0	3.6	0.8	0.1	0.0	0.0	0.0	0.0	0.0	0.0	1.3	5.7	16.5
Source: NOAA

== Demographics ==
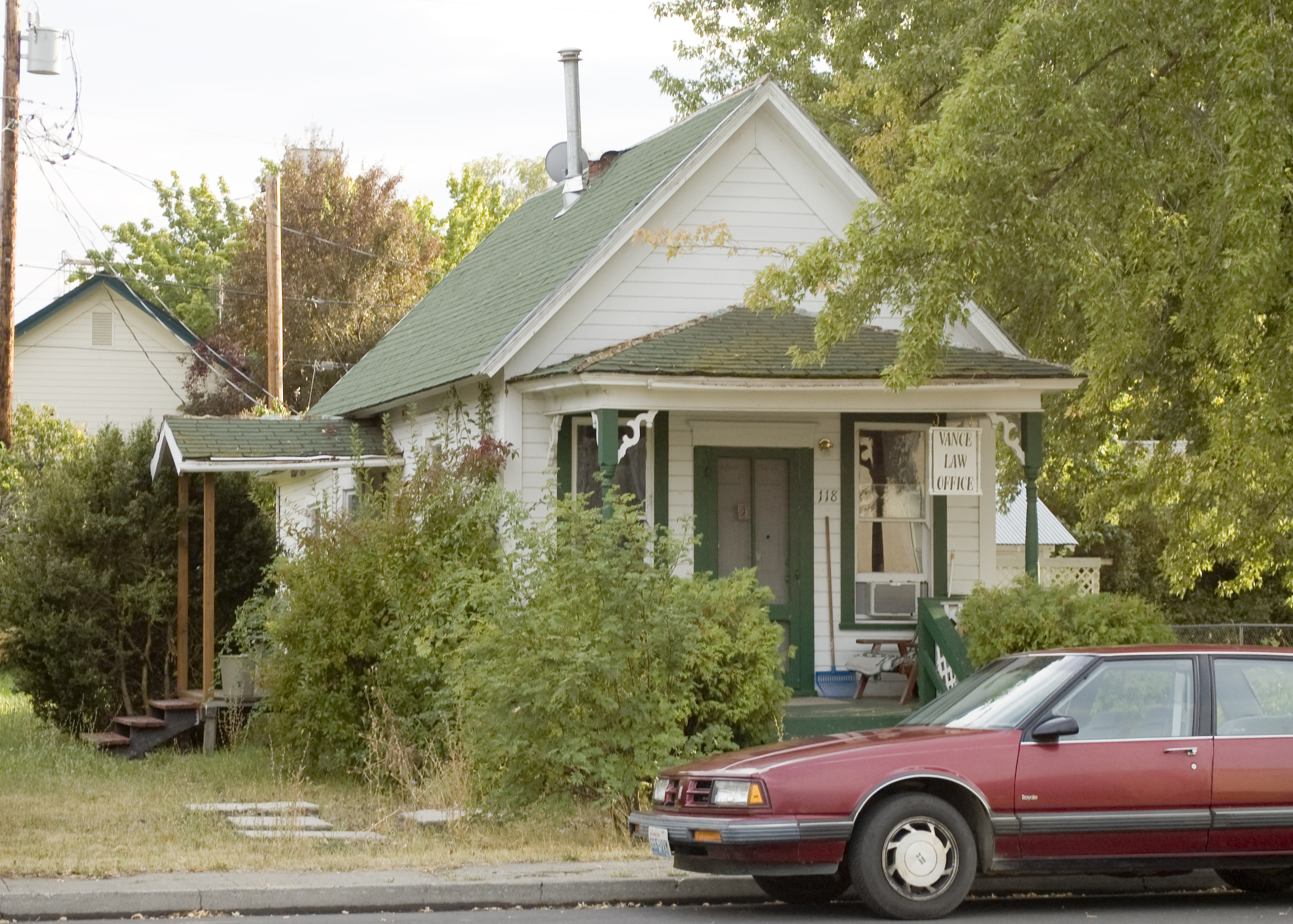
A house converted to office space.

Historical population
Census	Pop.	Note	%±
1880	545		—
1890	702		28.8%
1900	738		5.1%
1910	1,203		63.0%
1920	1,274		5.9%
1930	1,116		−12.4%
1940	1,584		41.9%
1950	1,907		20.4%
1960	2,536		33.0%
1970	2,484		−2.1%
1980	3,575		43.9%
1990	3,319		−7.2%
2000	3,760		13.3%
2010	3,407		−9.4%
2020	3,453		1.4%
U.S. Decennial Census; 2020 Census

=== 2020 census ===
As of the 2020 census, Goldendale had a population of 3,453. The median age was 42.5 years. 20.9% of residents were under the age of 18 and 22.2% of residents were 65 years of age or older. For every 100 females there were 96.9 males, and for every 100 females age 18 and over there were 93.8 males age 18 and over.

0.0% of residents lived in urban areas, while 100.0% lived in rural areas.

There were 1,536 households in Goldendale, of which 26.0% had children under the age of 18 living in them. Of all households, 35.7% were married-couple households, 22.7% were households with a male householder and no spouse or partner present, and 32.2% were households with a female householder and no spouse or partner present. About 34.3% of all households were made up of individuals and 15.3% had someone living alone who was 65 years of age or older.

There were 1,665 housing units, of which 7.7% were vacant. The homeowner vacancy rate was 0.7% and the rental vacancy rate was 7.5%.

Racial composition as of the 2020 census
Race	Number	Percent
White	2,899	84.0%
Black or African American	14	0.4%
American Indian and Alaska Native	92	2.7%
Asian	27	0.8%
Native Hawaiian and Other Pacific Islander	6	0.2%
Some other race	153	4.4%
Two or more races	262	7.6%
Hispanic or Latino (of any race)	334	9.7%

=== 2010 census ===
As of the 2010 census, there were 3,407 people, 1,462 households, and 858 families residing in the city. The population density was 1,352.0 inhabitants per square mile (522.0/km^{2}). There were 1,635 housing units at an average density of 648.8 per square mile (250.5/km^{2}). The racial makeup of the city was 88.3% white, 0.4% African American, 4.1% Native American, 0.5% Asian, 0.1% Pacific Islander, 4.1% from other races, and 2.6% from two or more races. Hispanic or Latino of any race were 8.4% of the population.

There were 1,462 households, of which 29.6% had children under the age of 18 living with them, 39.7% were married couples living together, 13.9% had a female householder with no husband present, 5.1% had a male householder with no wife present, and 41.3% were non-families. 35.1% of all households were made up of individuals, and 14.4% had someone living alone who was 65 years of age or older. The average household size was 2.30 and the average family size was 2.96.

The median age in the city was 40.4 years. 25.1% of residents were under the age of 18; 8.2% were between the ages of 18 and 24; 22.7% were from 25 to 44; 27% were from 45 to 64; and 17.1% were 65 years of age or older. The gender makeup of the city was 48.5% male and 51.5% female.

=== 2000 census ===
As of the 2000 census, there were 3,760 people, 1,515 households, and 963 families residing in the city. The population density was 1,592.6 people per square mile (615.1/km^{2}). There were 1,690 housing units at an average density of 715.8 per square mile (276.5/km^{2}). The racial makeup of the city was 87.42% White, 0.21% African American, 4.63% Native American, 0.72% Asian, 0.27% Pacific Islander, 4.07% from other races, and 2.69% from two or more races. Hispanic or Latino of any race were 5.85% of the population.

There were 1,515 households, out of which 34.4% had children under the age of 18 living with them, 46.4% were married couples living together, 12.7% had a female householder with no husband present, and 36.4% were non-families. 31.3% of all households were made up of individuals, and 14.1% had someone living alone who was 65 years of age or older. The average household size was 2.41 and the average family size was 3.02.

In the city, the population was spread out, with 28.4% under the age of 18, 7.7% from 18 to 24, 26.1% from 25 to 44, 22.6% from 45 to 64, and 15.2% who were 65 years of age or older. The median age was 36 years. For every 100 females, there were 90.6 males. For every 100 females age 18 and over, there were 89.4 males.

The median income for a household in the city was $26,030, and the median income for a family was $33,866. Males had a median income of $36,977 versus $22,289 for females. The per capita income for the city was $13,111. About 21.9% of families and 25.4% of the population were below the poverty line, including 30.5% of those under age 18 and 26.3% of those age 65 or over.

== Industry ==
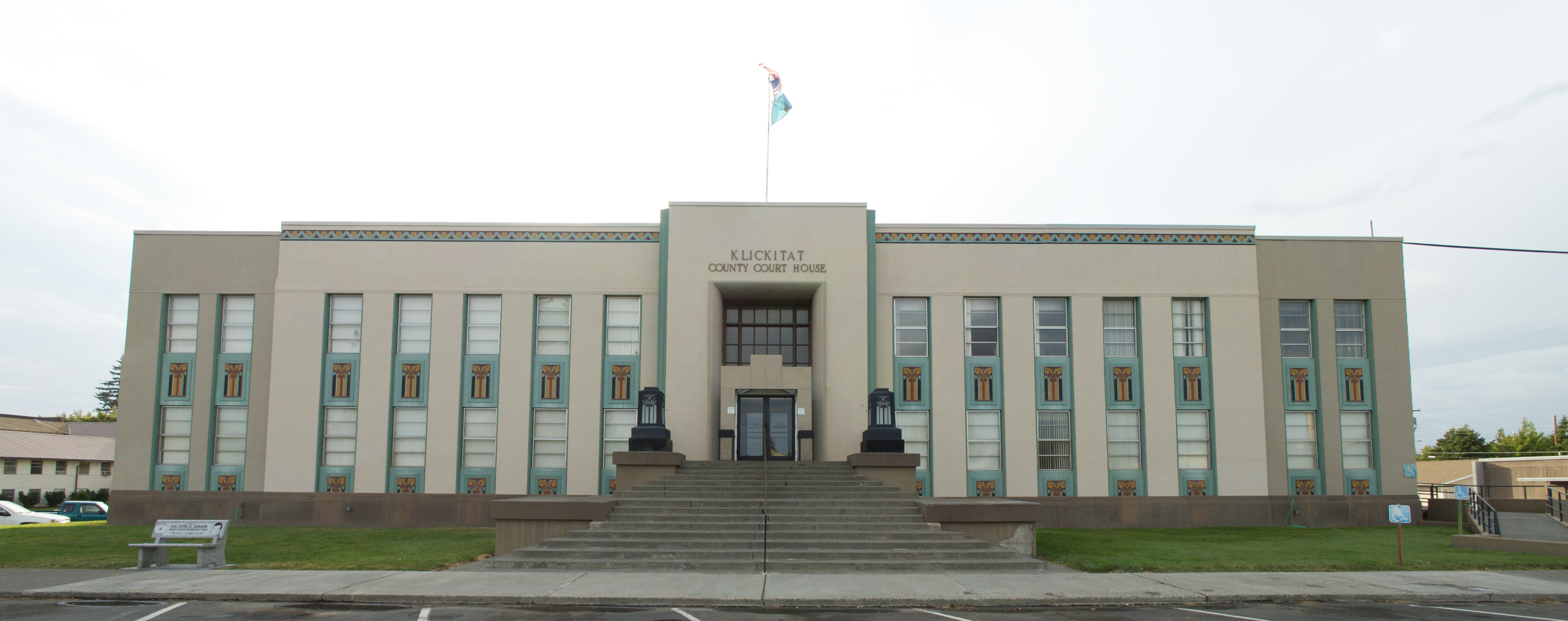
The Klickitat County Court House

A lumber mill and logging used to be major industries in the area but have since ceased to exist.

Timber cutting, ranching, farming, agriculture are still key industries in the area, but have seen some hard times over the years, an incidental effect to the modernization of farms and the ease of transporting products to ports on the Oregon Coast.

== Industrial plant ==
A closed aluminum processing plant had a big economic impact for 35 years and continues to impact the area as pensioners still draw benefits from the decades of operations.

The John Day area aluminum reduction plant was built by Harvey Aluminum (later Martin Marietta, forerunner to conglomerate Lockheed Martin) at an industrial site adjacent to the John Day Dam in 1968. The industrial development and resulting jobs brought an era of growth and prosperity to Goldendale for 35 years, which brought the area new levels of prosperity from the high paying industrial jobs with significant benefits. This plant added payroll strength and diversity of the timber- and agricultural-based Goldendale area economy. Many area residents still enjoy pension and healthcare benefits from the 35 years of the industrial operations.

The aluminum facility with 3 shifts of employment at its peak in the '70s and '80s was employing about 1,400–1,800 people and about 800 in the years from 1990 to 2003. The facility had been awarded a large allotment of low cost power from the hydro electric dam system that was nearby, with the assumption this would encourage industrial development and create jobs and resulting economic development. In 2003, the aluminum smelter closed operations. Reasons cited were high electricity costs and low world prices for aluminum. Many of the workers moved while others remained while they went back to school and retrained for other occupations. The closing of the aluminum plant caused serious economic stress in the area.

At this time Rabanco Regional Disposal is the largest single employer of residents in the Goldendale area.

== Culture ==
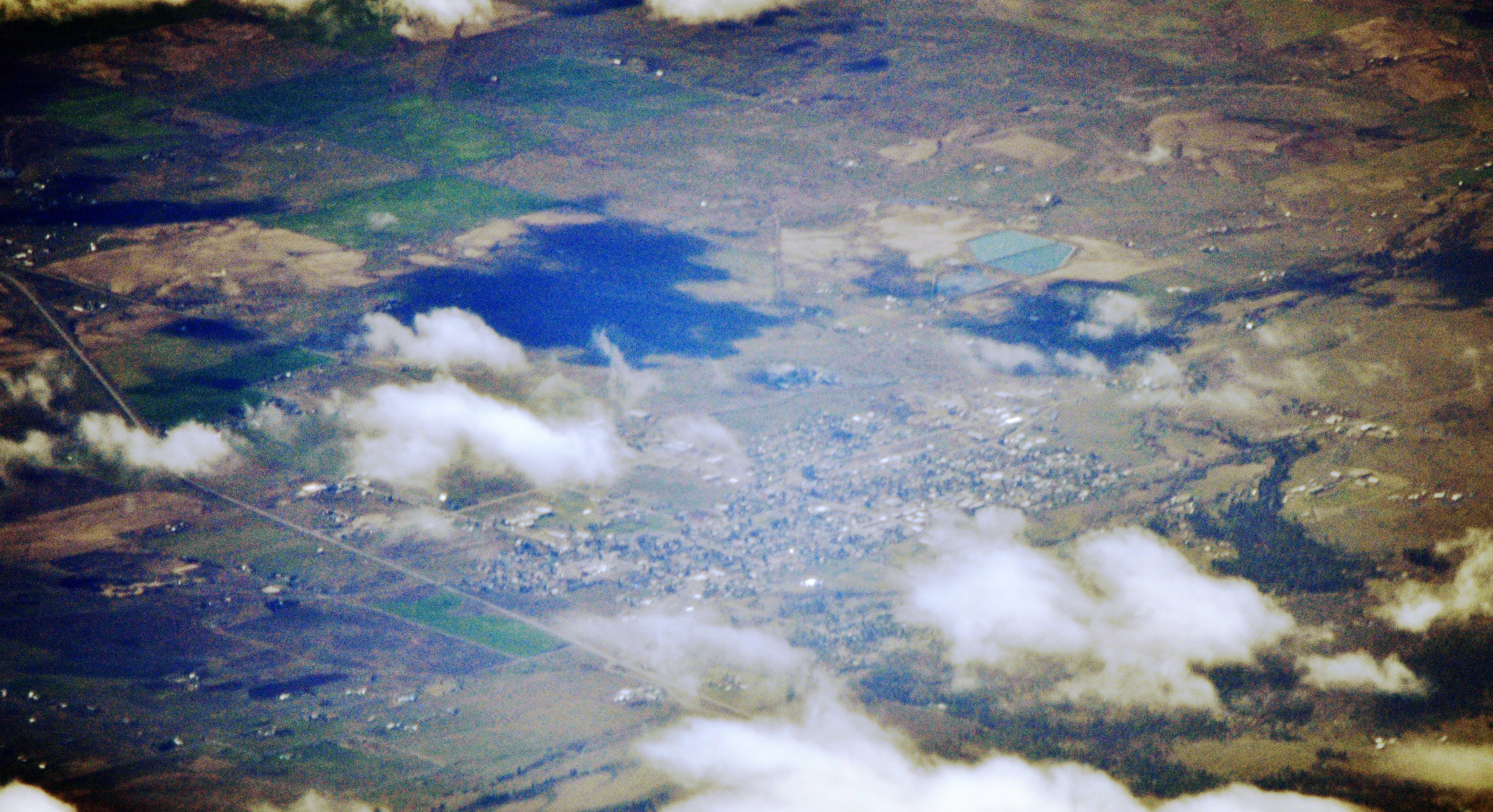
Aerial view of Goldendale from the northeast, 2015

Goldendale has many annual civic activities including the Klickitat County Fair & Rodeo, the Goldendale Community Days, held on the Goldendale Courthouse lawn, and holiday parades.

Goldendale's annual Pride celebration began in 2021.

=== Tourism ===
Goldendale's tourist attractions include the Goldendale Observatory, the nearby Maryhill Museum with a collection of 87 works by Auguste Rodin & a contemporary architectural construction by Portland-based firm Allied Works Architecture, and the Maryhill Stonehenge, a life-size cement replica of the original Stonehenge, situated ten minutes south of Goldendale. The replica, completed in 1930, is a memorial of those who died in World War I.

In downtown Goldendale, the Presby Mansion, now the Presby Museum, is also a tourist attraction featuring a newly restored 1898 Russel Steam Tractor and housing the Klickitat County Historical Society.

=== Media ===
The town has a weekly newspaper, the Goldendale Sentinel, which is published on Wednesdays and has a readership of approximately 3,200 subscribers across Klickitat County. It was established in 1879 as the Klickitat Sentinel and absorbed several rival newspapers in Goldendale and the county by the mid-1910s. The newspaper remains locally owned by its publisher.

== Notable people ==
- Bryan Caraway, UFC fighter, top 10 ranked and Goldendale local
- Margo Cilker, country singer, lives on a ranch in Goldendale
- Alan W. Jones, US Army major general
- Porter Lainhart, American football player
- Colston Loveland, NFL Tight End
- Lavina Washines, an elder of the Rock Creek band who became a Yakima Nation chairwoman
