= Klickitat River =

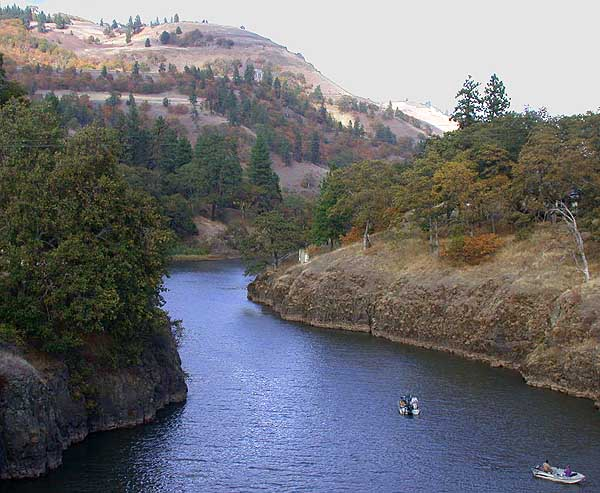
- The Klickitat River outside Lyle, Washington

- Mouth of the Klickitat River in Washington Klickitat River (the United States)

Location
- Country: United States
- State: Washington
- County: Klickitat County, Yakima County

Physical characteristics
- Source
  - location: Cascade Range, Yakima County, Washington
  - coordinates: 46°29′13″N 121°25′16″W
  - elevation: 6,440 ft (1,960 m)
- Mouth: Columbia River
  - location: Lyle, Washington
  - coordinates: 45°41′47″N 121°17′29″W
  - elevation: 80 ft (24 m)
- Length: 95.8 mi (154.2 km)
- Basin size: 1,350 sq mi (3,500 km^{2})
- Discharge
  - location: Lyle, at mouth
  - average: 1,572 cu ft/s (44.5 m^{3}/s)
  - minimum: 412 cu ft/s (11.7 m^{3}/s)
  - maximum: 51,000 cu ft/s (1,400 m^{3}/s)

National Wild and Scenic River
- Type: Recreational
- Designated: November 17, 1986

The Klickitat River is a tributary of the Columbia River, nearly 96 miles (154 km) long, in south-central Washington in the United States. It drains a rugged plateau area on the eastern side of the Cascade Range northeast of Portland, Oregon. In 1986, 10 miles (16 km) of the river were designated Wild and Scenic from the confluence with Wheeler Creek, near the town of Pitt, to the confluence with the Columbia River.

== Course ==
The Klickitat River rises in the high Cascades near Gilbert Peak, in northwestern Yakima County, in a remote corner of the Yakama Indian Reservation. It flows southeast, then generally south across the Lincoln Plateau. It enters northern Klickitat County, and meanders south through steep canyons. It enters the Columbia from the north at Lyle, approximately 10 miles (16 km) north-northwest of The Dalles, Oregon. State Route 142 follows the lower 15 miles (24 km) of the river. The river is bridged by State Route 14 at its mouth.

== Recreation ==
The Klickitat Trail follows the river on an abandoned railroad grade from near Goldendale, Washington to the Columbia River just west of The Dalles, Oregon, nearly 30 miles (48 km).

== See also ==
- List of Washington rivers
- Tributaries of the Columbia River
- List of National Wild and Scenic Rivers
- Outlet Falls
