= Spiral Butte =

Extinct volcano in Washington, United States

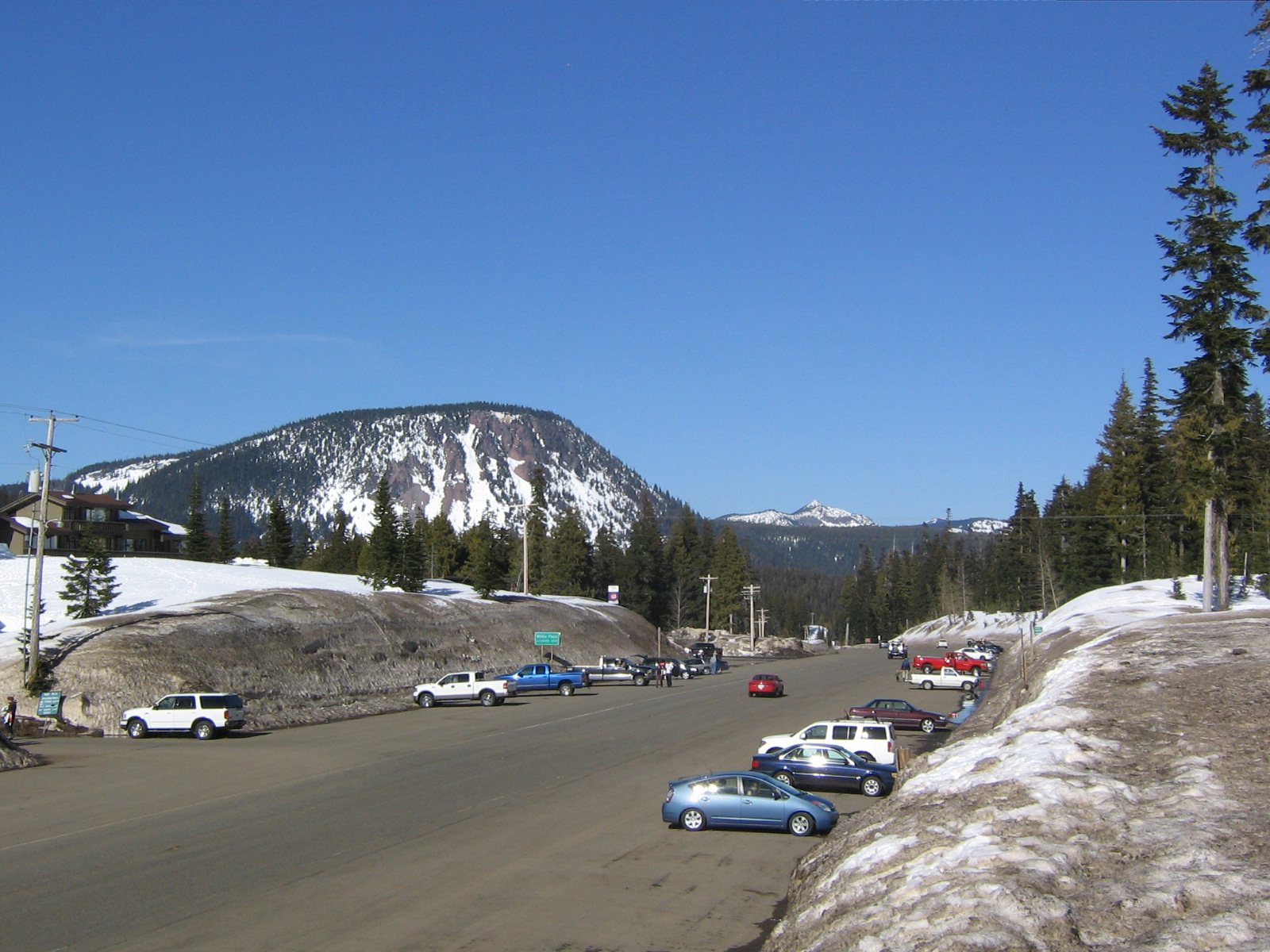
- Spiral Butte seen looking to the east from White Pass. US 12 is in the foreground.

Highest point
- Elevation: 5,929 ft (1,807 m)
- Parent peak: Cramer Mountain (6,037 ft)
- Coordinates: 46°39′53″N 121°21′16″W

Geography
- Location within Washington (state)
- Country: United States
- State: Washington
- County: Yakima County
- Protected area: William O. Douglas Wilderness
- Parent range: Cascade Range

Geology
- Rock age: <690,000 years
- Mountain type: Cinder cone
- Volcanic zone: Goat Rocks

Spiral Butte is a cinder cone in Yakima County, Washington in the United States. The summit and most of the slopes are located within the William O. Douglas Wilderness of the Okanogan–Wenatchee National Forest between White Pass and Rimrock Lake. Historically the mountain has also been referred to as Big Peak. The present name stems from its orientation with a lava flow extending north out of the cone before spiraling east and then south. US 12 runs along the southern slope of the butte.

== Geography and Geology ==
Spiral Butte is located in the Cascade Range in the Pacific Northwest. This mountain range exhibits several volcanoes which formed as the Juan de Fuca Plate located off the coast subducted under the North American Plate. Volcanoes in the range extend from Northern California to British Columbia, including Mount Rainier nearby as well as Mount St. Helens and Mount Shasta.

The cinder cone is modestly eroded and believed to be a satellite vent of Goat Rocks, an extinct and eroded stratovolcano to the south. The volcanic field for Goat Rocks extends from the mountains themselves north to American Ridge near Bumping Lake. Spiral Butte is surrounded by other Goat Rocks vents and lava flows, such as Tumac and Cramer Mountains to the north and Round Mountain to the south. Spiral Butte is separated from Round Mountain, which is in the Goat Rocks Wilderness by the canyon that Clear Creek flows through.

Exposed lava from Spiral Butte is hornblende dacite which has moderately high silica content. Other Cascade volcanoes also exhibit deposits of dacite. The exposed lava is less than 690,000 years old.

== Recreation ==
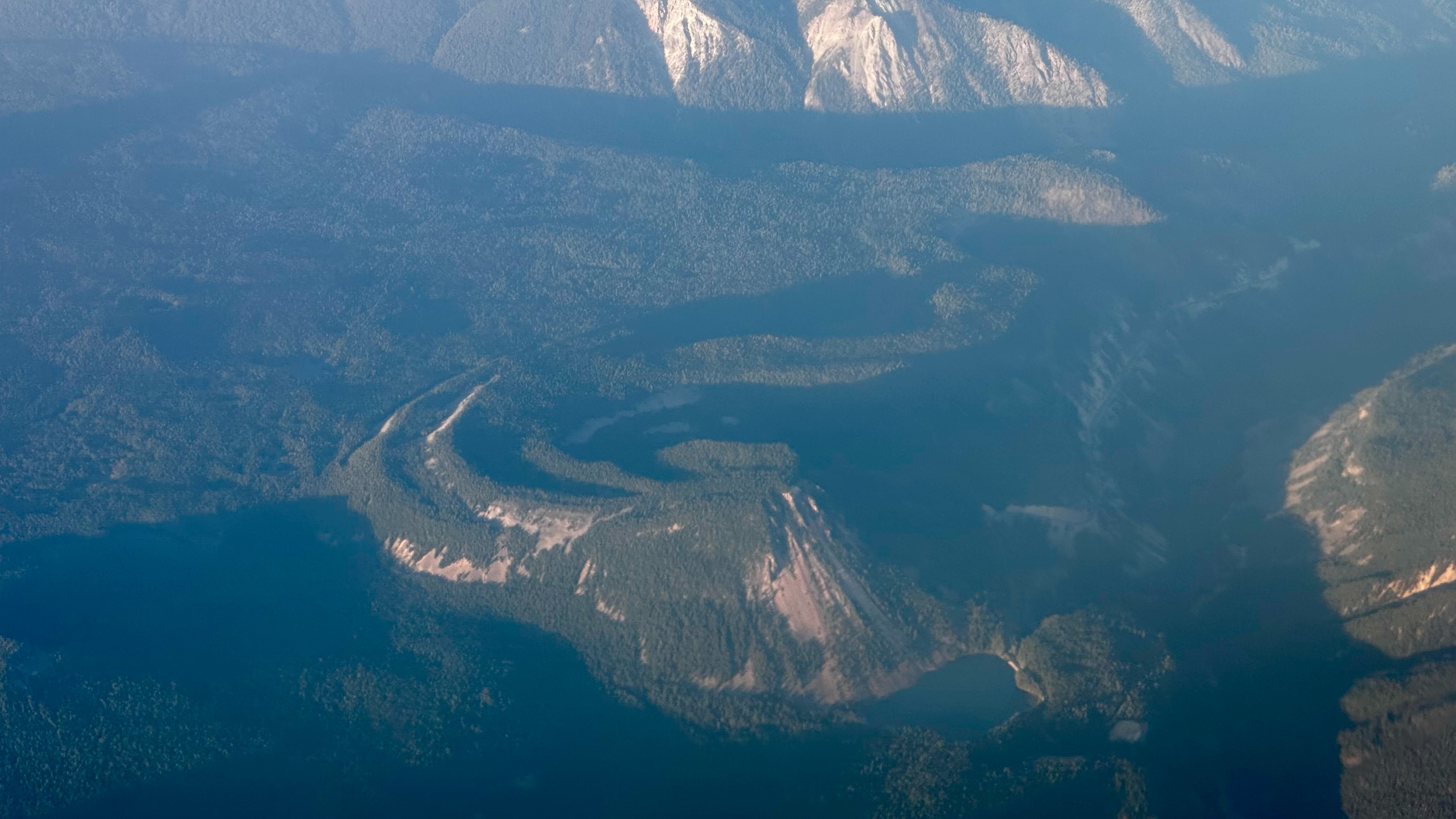
Aerial view of Spiral Butte. Dog Lake sits at the base of the butte.

Located within the William O. Douglas Wilderness of the Okanogan-Wenatchee National Forest, motorized vehicles are not allowed on Spiral Butte. A trail ascends the butte, connecting it to other backcountry trails in the region. The closest trailhead is the Sand Ridge Trailhead on US 12 near Dog Lake. Hiking directly from the Sand Ridge Trailhead is an 11 mi (18 km) round trip with 2,500 ft (760 m) of elevation gain. Being a cinder cone, the trail up the butte is sandy. Visitors climb through a ponderosa pine forest that transitions to Douglas fir and other similar trees with altitude. White Pass Ski Area, Rimrock Lake, and nearby volcanoes are visible from the summit.
