= Three Way Peak =

Mountain in Washington (state), United States

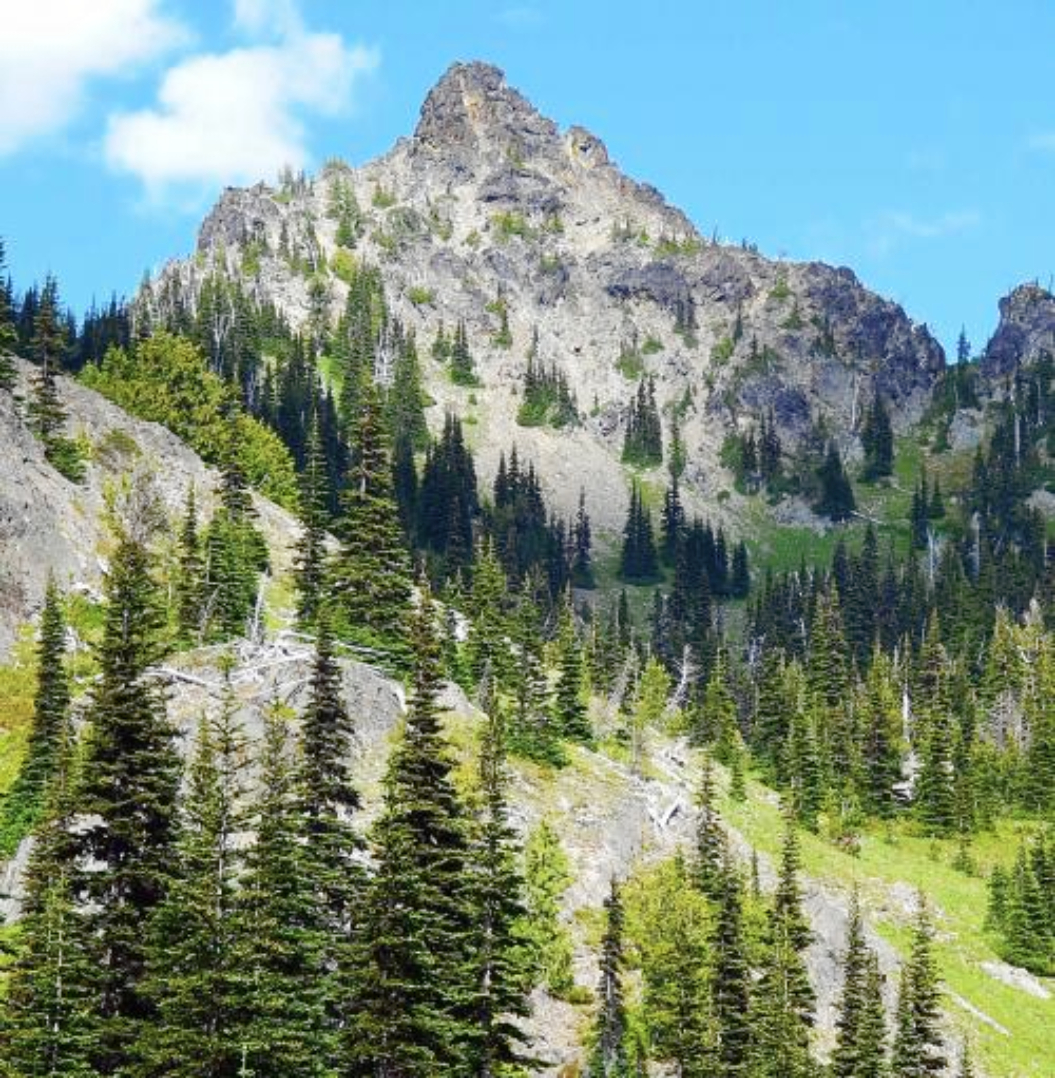
- Three Way Peak seen from Upper Crystal Lake

Highest point
- Elevation: 6,796 ft (2,071 m)
- Prominence: 236 ft (72 m)
- Parent peak: Crystal Mountain (6,998 ft)
- Isolation: 0.59 mi (0.95 km)
- Coordinates: 46°54′32″N 121°29′47″W

Geography
- Location within Washington (state) Location within the United States
- Country: United States
- State: Washington
- County: Pierce
- Protected area: Mount Rainier National Park
- Parent range: Cascades
- Topo map: USGS Norse Peak

Climbing
- Easiest route: class 2 scrambling

Three Way Peak is a 6,796 feet (2,071 m) summit located on the eastern border of Mount Rainier National Park. It is also on the shared border of Pierce County and Yakima County in Washington state. Three Way Peak is situated 0.42 mi (0.68 km) north of Cupalo Rock on the crest of the Cascade Range. Its nearest higher peak is Crystal Mountain, 0.56 mi (0.90 km) to the northwest. Chinook Peak is 0.8 mile to the southwest. Precipitation runoff from Three Way Peak drains into tributaries of the White River and Naches River.

== Climate ==
Three Way Peak is located in the marine west coast climate zone of western North America. Most weather fronts originating in the Pacific Ocean travel northeast toward the Cascade Mountains. As fronts approach, they are forced upward by the peaks of the Cascade Range (orographic lift), causing them to drop their moisture in the form of rain or snow onto the Cascades. As a result, the west side of the Cascades experiences high precipitation, especially during the winter months in the form of snowfall. Because of maritime influence, snow tends to be wet and heavy, resulting in high avalanche danger. During winter months, weather is usually cloudy, but due to high pressure systems over the Pacific Ocean that intensify during summer months, there is often little or no cloud cover during the summer.

== See also ==
- Geology of the Pacific Northwest

== Gallery ==
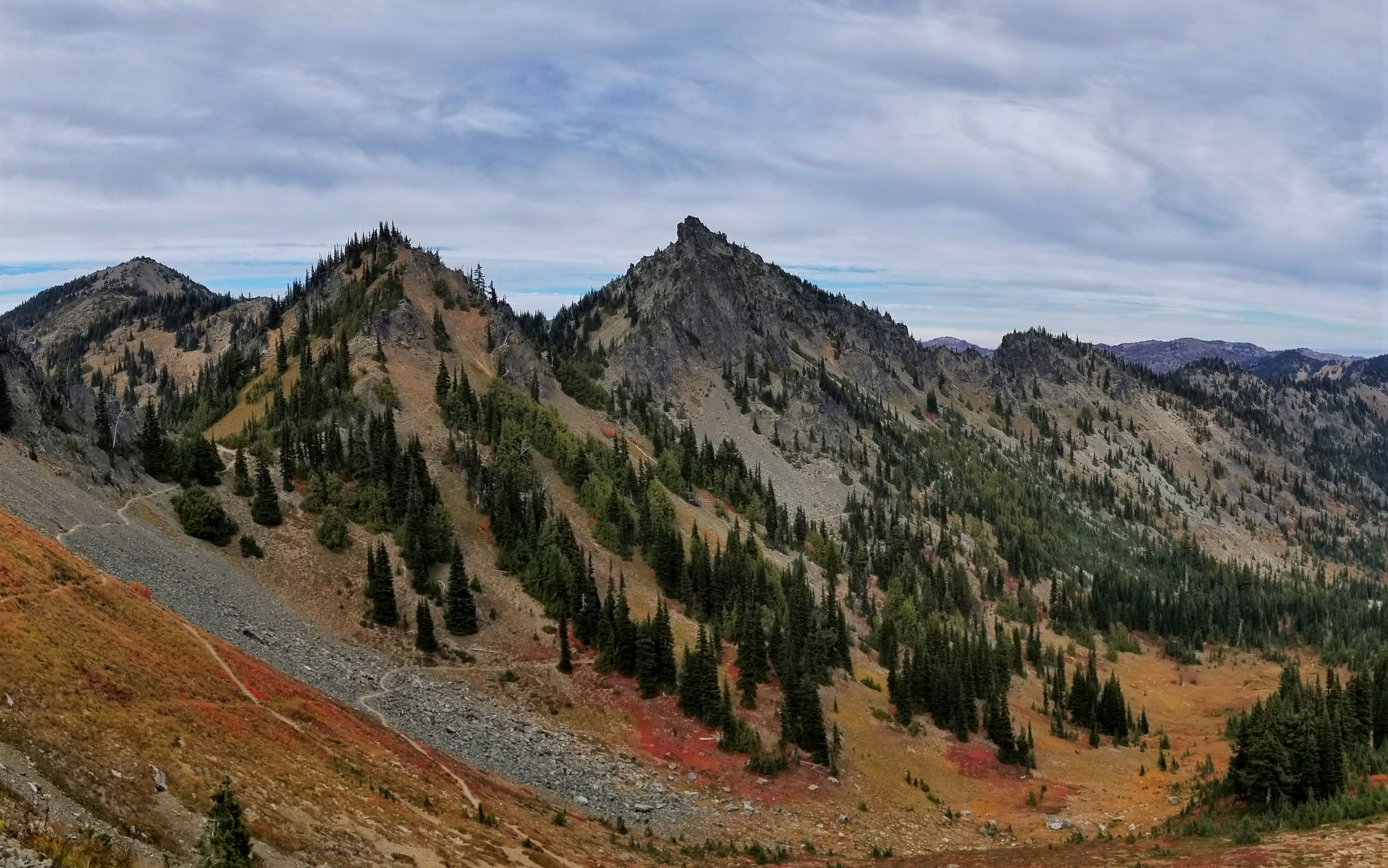
Three Way Peak from Sourdough Gap

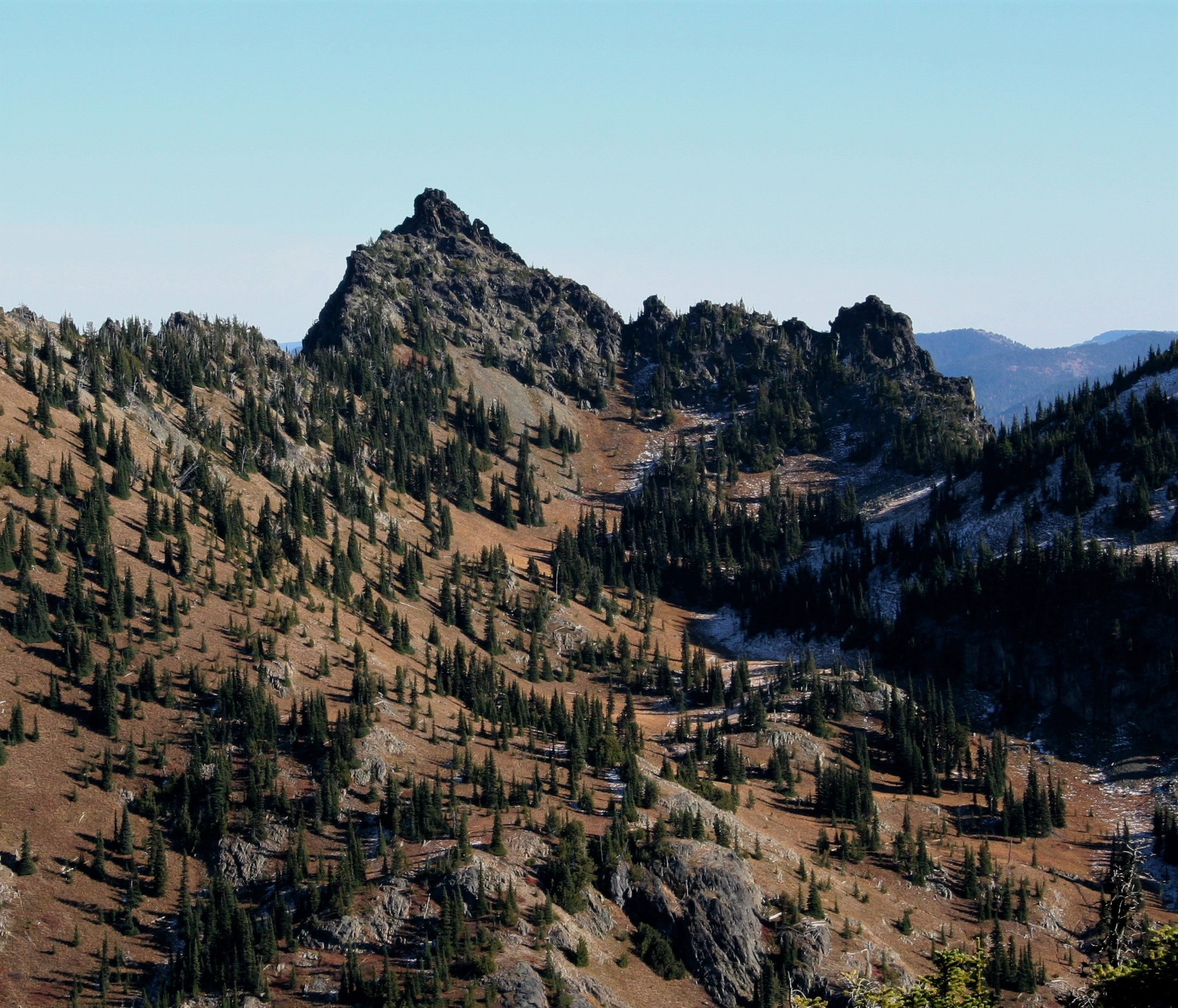
Three Way Peak from Crystal Peak

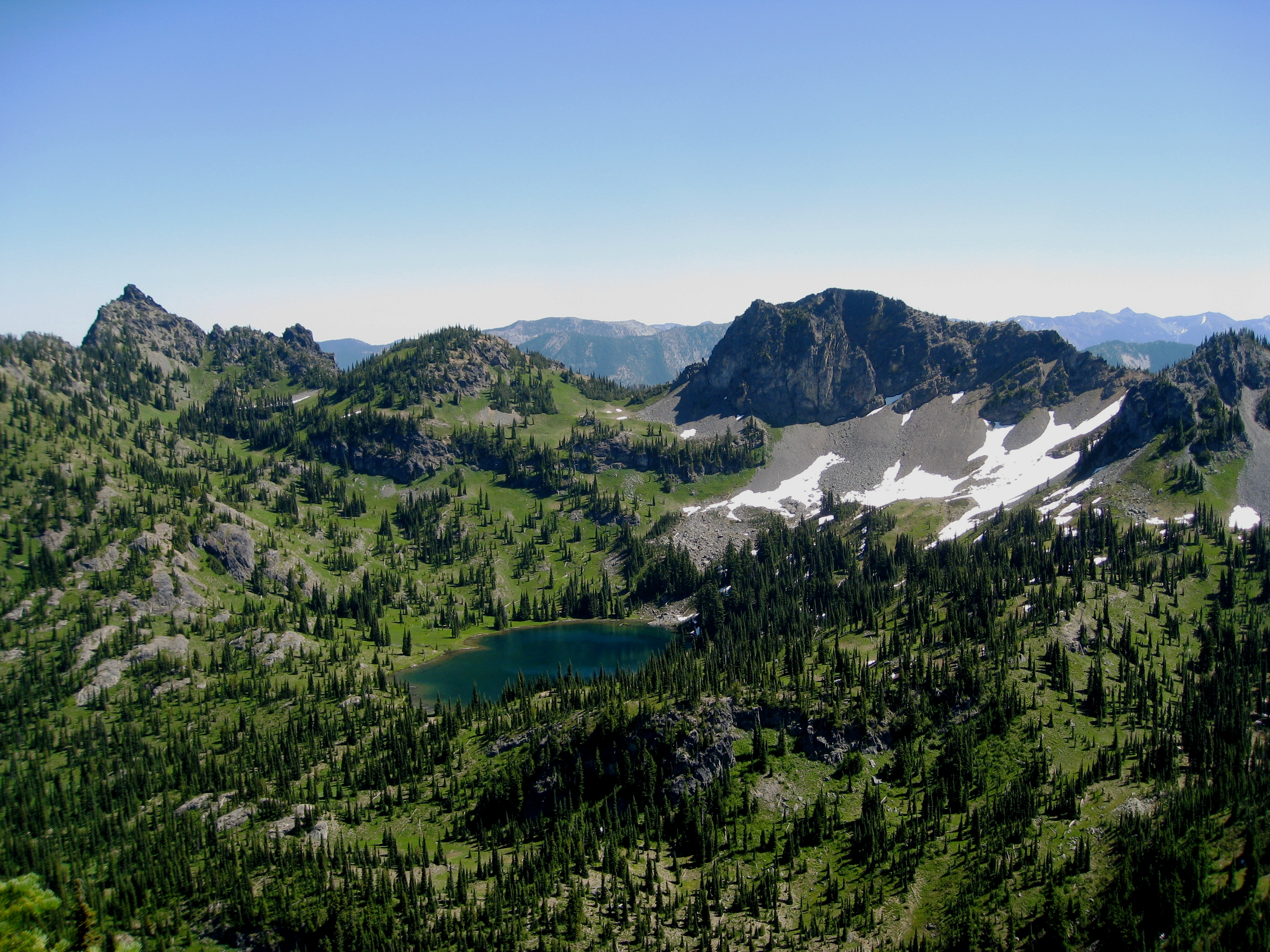
Three Way Peak to left, Peak 6708 (right), Crystal Lake (center)

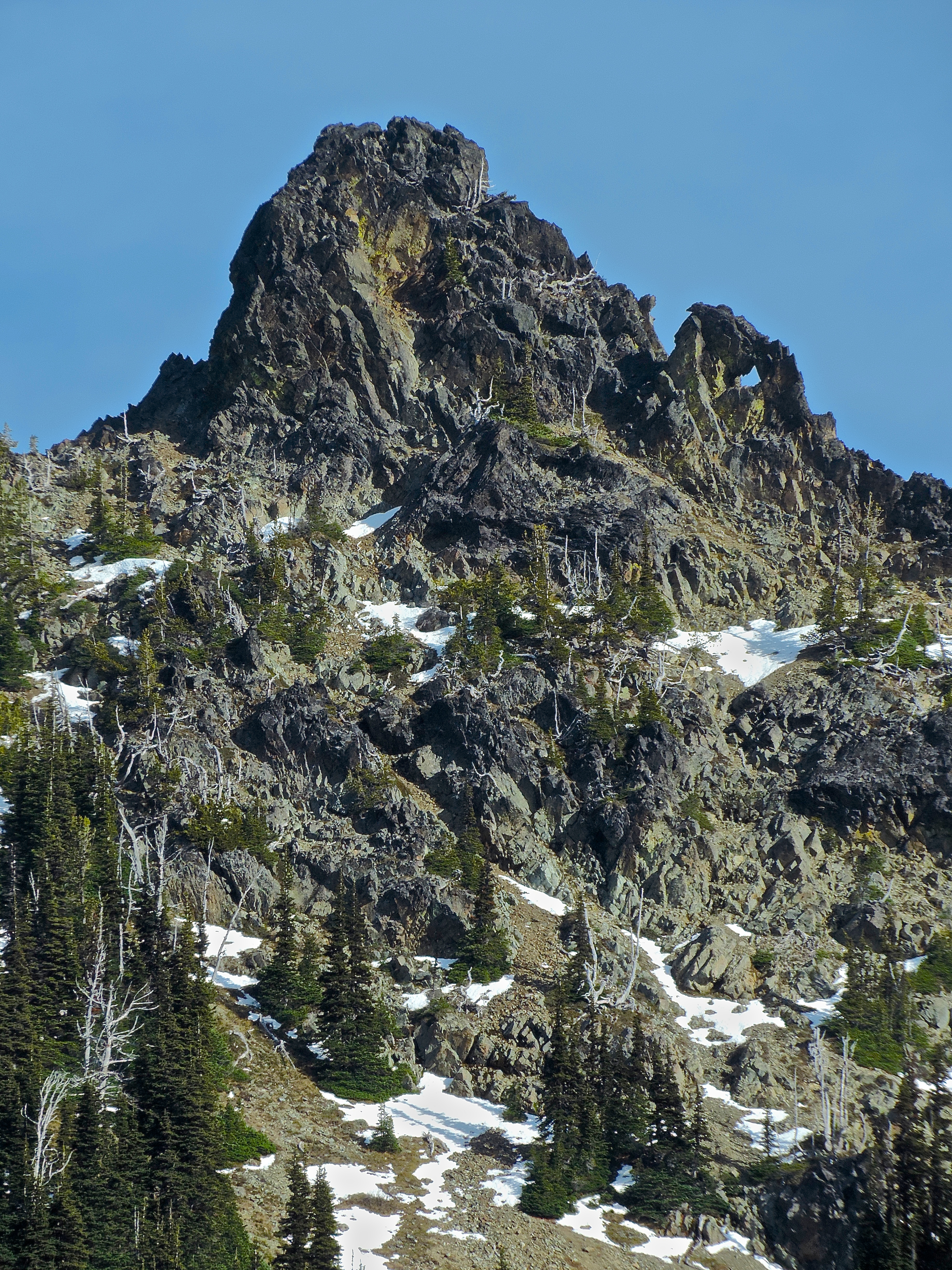
West aspect
