= Bismarck Peak =

Mountain in Washington (state), United States

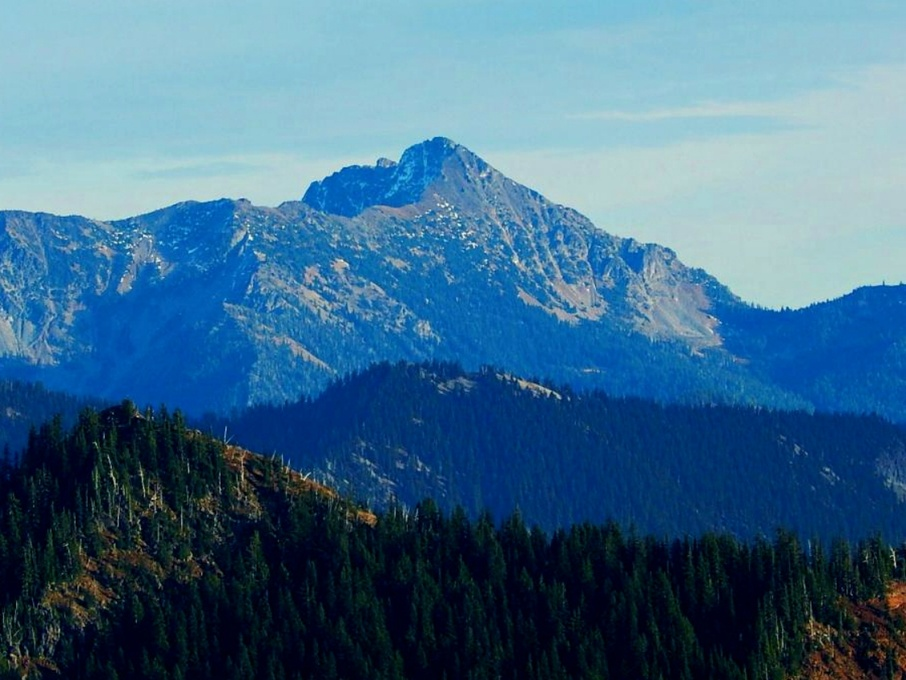
- Bismarck Peak seen from northwest

Highest point
- Elevation: 7,585 ft (2,312 m)
- Prominence: 625 ft (191 m)
- Parent peak: Mount Aix (7,766 ft)
- Isolation: 2.21 mi (3.56 km)
- Coordinates: 46°45′56″N 121°16′27″W

Geography
- Location within Washington (state) Location within the United States
- Country: United States
- State: Washington
- County: Yakima
- Protected area: William O. Douglas Wilderness
- Parent range: Cascades
- Topo map: USGS Bumping Lake

Climbing
- Easiest route: Scrambling class 2

Bismarck Peak is a 7,585-foot-elevation (2,312-meter) mountain summit in Yakima County of Washington state. It is also 24 miles east-southeast of Mount Rainier and centrally located in the William O. Douglas Wilderness, on land administered by the Wenatchee National Forest. Bismarck Peak is situated east of the crest of the Cascade Range, southeast of Bumping Lake, south of Mount Aix, and northwest of Rimrock Lake. Its nearest higher peak is Mount Aix, 2.2 mi (3.5 km) to the north-northeast. Aix and Bismarck are the two highest peaks midway between Mount Rainier National Park and Yakima, Washington so they are quite prominent. Precipitation runoff from Bismarck Peak drains into tributaries of the Yakima River, thence to the Columbia River.

== Climate ==
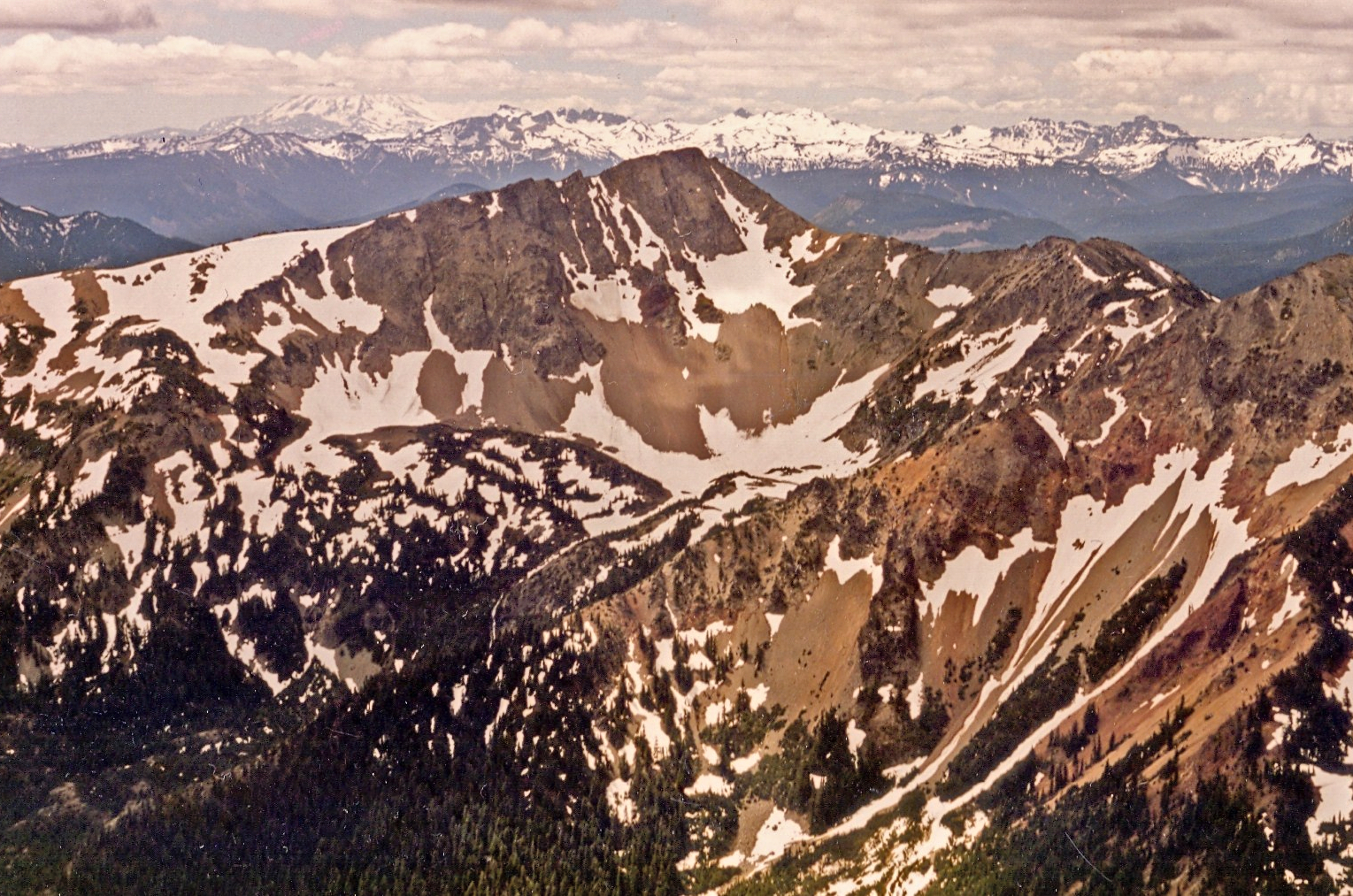
Bismarck Peak seen from Mt. Aix

Bismarck Peak is located east of the Cascade crest. Most weather fronts originating in the Pacific Ocean travel northeast toward the Cascade Mountains. As fronts approach, they are forced upward by the peaks of the Cascade Range (orographic lift), causing them to drop their moisture in the form of rain or snow onto the Cascades. As a result, the east side of the Cascades experiences less precipitation than the west side of the crest. During winter months, weather is usually cloudy, but due to high pressure systems over the Pacific Ocean that intensify during summer months, there is often little or no cloud cover during the summer.

== See also ==
- List of mountain peaks of Washington (state)
