= Rock Stars (TV series) =

- title card
- Created by: Justin Ward
- Directed by: Justin Ward
- Narrated by: Pat Duke
- Opening theme: "Point Blank" by John Pratt
- Country of origin: United States
- No. of seasons: 1
- No. of episodes: 10 (list of episodes)

Production
- Executive producers: Hugh Arian; Justin Ward
- Producers: Erik Swanson; Tracy Thomas
- Running time: 40–45 minutes
- Production company: Echo Entertainment

Original release
- Network: National Geographic Channel
- Release: November 22, 2011 – present

Rock Stars is a documentary/reality television series produced by Echo Entertainment for the National Geographic Channel. The series follows a team of rock scalers from a slope stabilization/rock remediation company. The series aired ten episodes with the first episode released on November 22, 2011.

== Plot ==
The series portrays a group of rock remediation technicians whose primary objective is to protect the public and their communities from rockslides. As trained professionals, these men suspend on the sides of cliffs that are anywhere from 25 to 200-feet high and remove any unstable rocks or boulders that could pose a potential threat to unsuspecting drivers and hikers below. The crew use scale bars, a crow-bar type of tool with an angled tip, to bring down most of the rock. Often they also utilize rubber airbags inflated by an air compressor to bring down the larger masses of rock. The company also specializes in rock bolting, wire mesh installation, rock net installation, shotcrete, slope monitoring and slope blasting. The company has been around since 1968 and has long been a leader in the rock remediation world.

== Location ==
The first season takes place in two locations, White Pass (Washington) along U.S. Route 12 and Niagara Falls.

== Production ==
The documentary was filmed and produced by Echo Entertainment, a production company out of Studio City, California. Each member of the production crew was required to attend a week-long training course to obtain a certification in ropes access. Cameramen shooting on Sony EX-1s and Sony XDCam-800s were often suspended over the sides of the cliffs while shooting the scalers on the mountain. GoPro helmet cameras were also mounted on the helmets of each rock scaler to capture POV of the scalers on the hill.

== Episodes ==
- "Chaos On The Cascades" – 11/22/2011
- "Deathtrap" – 11/29/2011
- "Meltdown on the Mountain" – 12/6/2011
- "Man v. Boulder" – 12/13/2011
- "Falling Apart" – 12/20/2011
- "Assault On Niagara" – 12/27/2011
- "House of Cards" – 1/3/2012
- "D-Day" – 1/10/2012
- "Bolt to the Finish" – 1/17/2012
- "Blowing Up" – 1/24/2012
