= Cupalo Rock =

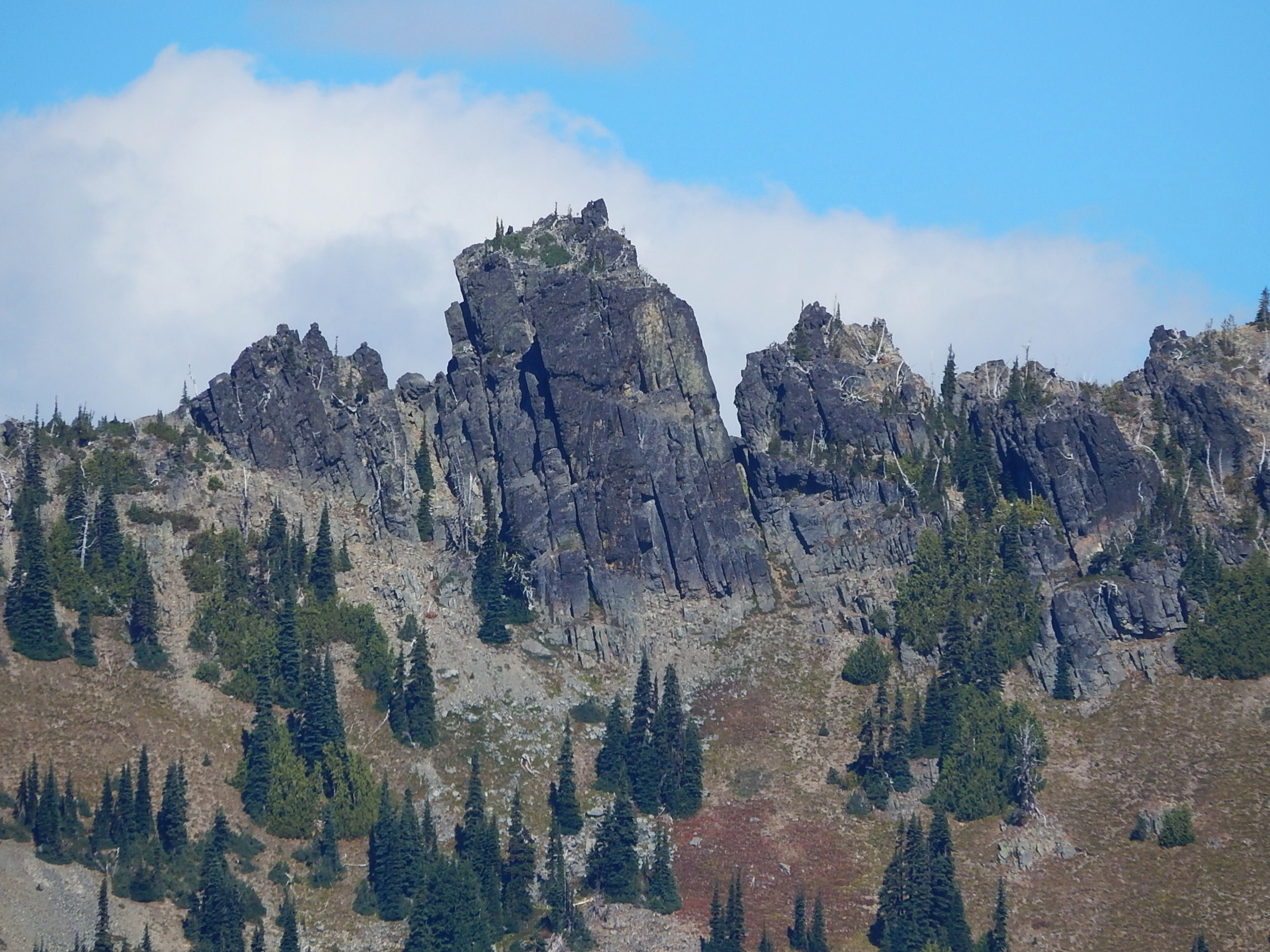
- Cupalo Rock seen from Chinook Pass

Highest point
- Elevation: 6,593 ft (2,010 m)
- Prominence: 193 ft (59 m)
- Parent peak: Chinook Peak
- Isolation: 0.76 mi (1.22 km)
- Coordinates: 46°53′59″N 121°29′39″W

Geography
- Location within Washington (state) Location within the United States
- Country: United States
- State: Washington
- County: Yakima
- Parent range: Cascades
- Topo map: USGS Norse Peak

Climbing
- First ascent: 1965, John Brottem and party
- Easiest route: Climbing class 5

Cupalo Rock is a 6,593-foot (2,010 m) summit located in Yakima County in Washington state. Cupalo Rock is situated two miles north-northeast of Chinook Pass, one mile east-northeast of Chinook Peak, and barely east of the crest of the Cascade Range. The nearest higher peak is Three Way Peak, 0.42 mi (0.68 km) to the west-northwest. Access for climbing Cupalo Rock is normally from the Pacific Crest Trail at Sourdough Gap. Precipitation runoff from Cupalo Rock drains into tributaries of the American River.

== Climate ==
Cupalo Rock is located in the marine west coast climate zone of western North America. Weather fronts originating in the Pacific Ocean travel northeast toward the Cascade Mountains. As fronts approach, they are forced upward by the peaks of the Cascade Range (orographic lift), causing them to drop their moisture in the form of rain or snow onto the Cascades. As a result, the west side of the Cascades experiences high precipitation, especially during the winter months in the form of snowfall. Snowpack closes the highway through Chinook Pass seasonally, which is typically November through May. During winter months, weather is usually cloudy, but due to high pressure systems over the Pacific Ocean that intensify during summer months, there is often little or no cloud cover during the summer.
