= Bumping River =

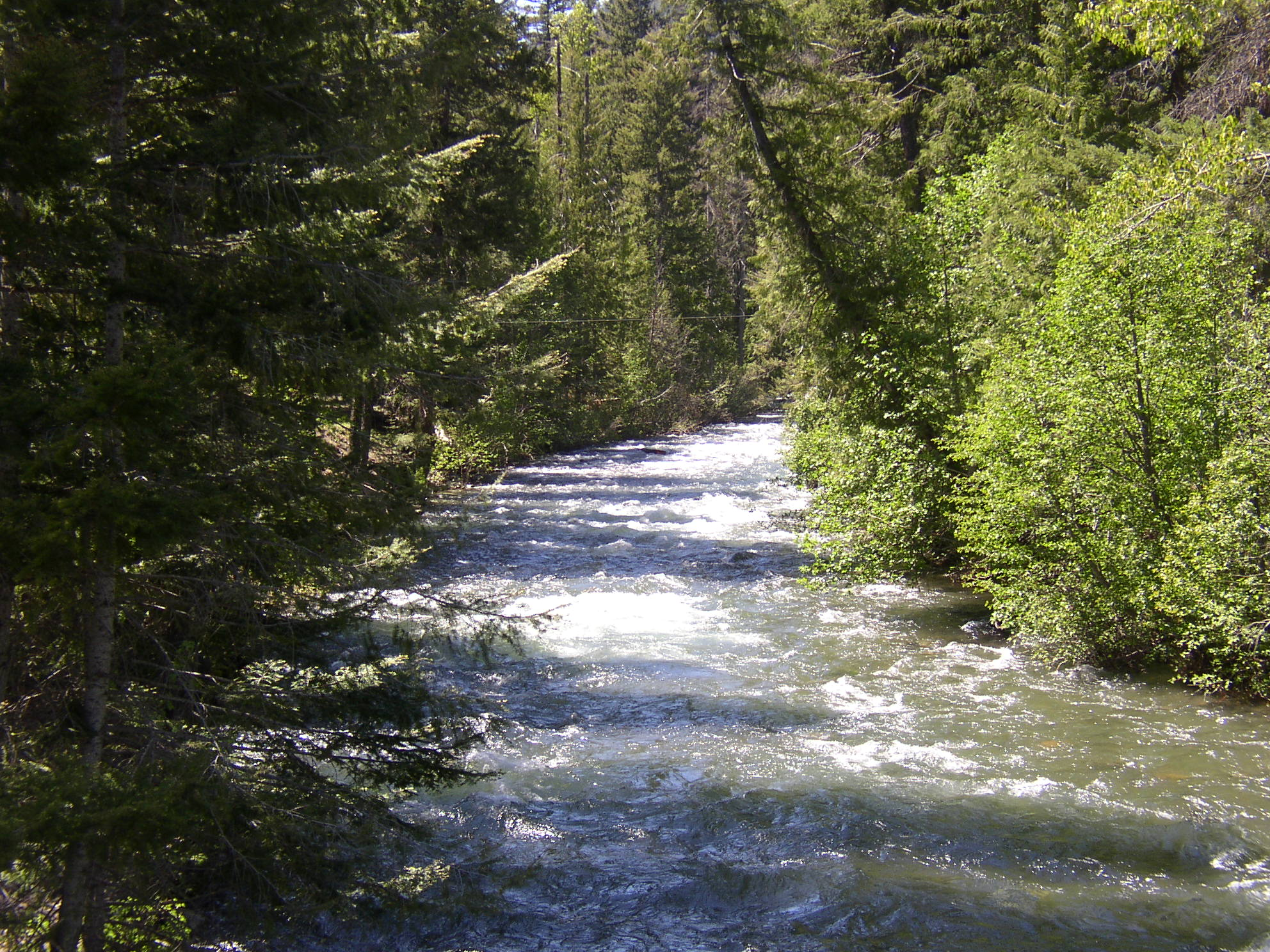
- Bumping River

- Location of the mouth of the Bumping River in Washington Bumping River (the United States)

Location
- Country: United States
- State: Washington
- Region: Yakima County

Physical characteristics
- Source: Fish Lake (Yakima County, Washington)
  - coordinates: 46°45′34″N 121°26′19″W
  - elevation: 4,155 ft (1,266 m)
- Mouth: Naches River
  - coordinates: 46°59′18″N 121°5′38″W
  - elevation: 2,555 ft (779 m)
- Length: 25 mi (40 km)
- Discharge
  - location: Bumping Lake Dam
  - average: 282 cu ft/s (8.0 m^{3}/s)

Basin features
- Tributaries
  - left: American River

The Bumping River is a tributary of the Naches River, in Washington in the United States. It flows down the east side of the Cascade Range, through Wenatchee National Forest and the William O. Douglas Wilderness. From its source at Fish Lake near Crag Mountain, it flows northeast to Bumping Lake, a natural lake enlarged and regulated by Bumping Lake Dam. Below the dam, the Bumping River continues flowing northeast. It is joined by the American River, its main tributary, a few miles above its mouth where it joins the Little Naches River to form the Naches River.

Bumping River is part of the Columbia River basin, being a tributary of the Naches River, which is a tributary to the Yakima River, which is a tributary to the Columbia River.

Stockmen said that the river's name was given because during a freshet heavy boulders were carried down the river creating a rumbling vibration as the rocks kept bumping together. Variant names listed by the United States Geological Survey (USGS) for the Bumping River include Tancum River and Tanum River.

== See also ==
- List of rivers of Washington (state)
- List of tributaries of the Columbia River
