= Mount Aix =

Mountain in Washington (state), United States

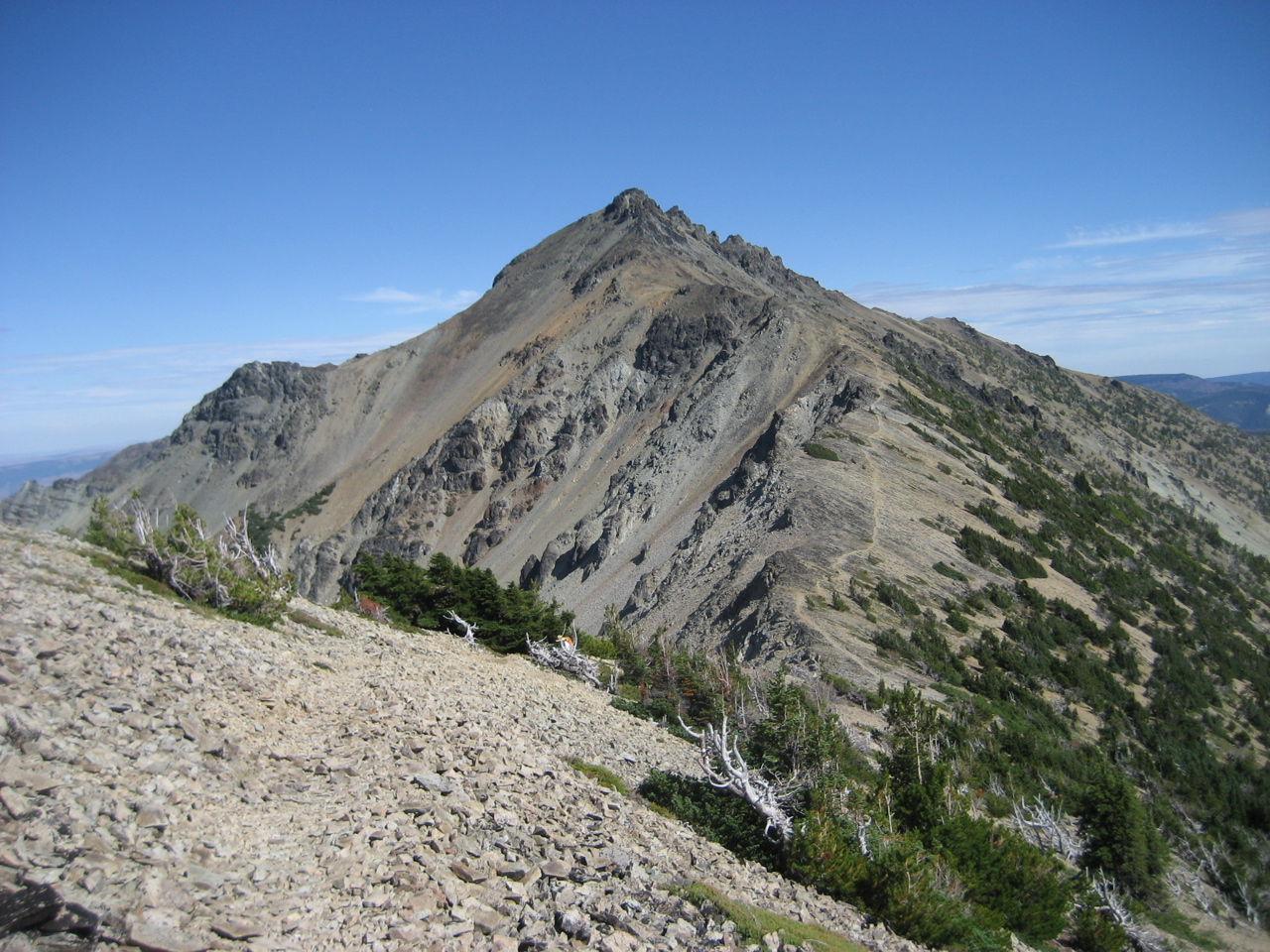
- Mount Aix, northwest aspect

Highest point
- Elevation: 7,766 ft (2,367 m)
- Prominence: 3,296 ft (1,005 m)
- Parent peak: Old Snowy Mountain
- Isolation: 20.67 mi (33.27 km)
- Coordinates: 46°47′42″N 121°15′21″W

Geography
- Location within Washington (state) Location within the United States
- Interactive map of Mount Aix
- Country: United States
- State: Washington
- County: Yakima
- Protected area: William O. Douglas Wilderness
- Parent range: Cascades
- Topo map: USGS Bumping Lake

Geology
- Mountain type: Volcanic complex

Climbing
- Easiest route: Trail class 1

Mount Aix is a 7,766-foot (2,367 m) mountain summit in Yakima County of Washington state.

== Description ==
Mount Aix is set in the William O. Douglas Wilderness on land administered by the Wenatchee National Forest and is the highest point in the wilderness area. Mount Aix is situated east of the crest of the Cascade Range, southeast of Bumping Lake, north of Bismarck Peak, and northwest of Rimrock Lake. It is also 24 miles east-southeast of Mount Rainier. The nearest higher peak is Tieton Peak in the Goat Rocks Wilderness, 19.9 mi (32.0 km) to the south-southwest. Mount Aix is the highest peak in the entire region which is east of Mount Rainier National Park, north of Goat Rocks Wilderness, west of Yakima, and south of Mount Daniel (Alpine Lakes Wilderness), so it is quite prominent. Prior to 1897 (when Mount Aix was officially recognized by the USGS) the toponym was spelled as Mount Aiks on early survey maps and publications.

== Climate ==
Mount Aix is located east of the Cascade crest. Most weather fronts originating in the Pacific Ocean travel northeast toward the Cascade Mountains. As fronts approach, they are forced upward by the peaks of the Cascade Range (orographic lift), causing them to drop their moisture in the form of rain or snow onto the Cascades. As a result, the east side of the Cascades experiences less precipitation than the west side of the crest. During winter months, weather is usually cloudy, but due to high pressure systems over the Pacific Ocean that intensify during summer months, there is often little or no cloud cover during the summer. Precipitation runoff from Mount Aix drains into tributaries of the Yakima River, thence into the Columbia River.

== Geology ==
Mount Aix is a volcanic complex, mostly referred to as the Mount Aix Volcanic Complex.

== Gallery ==
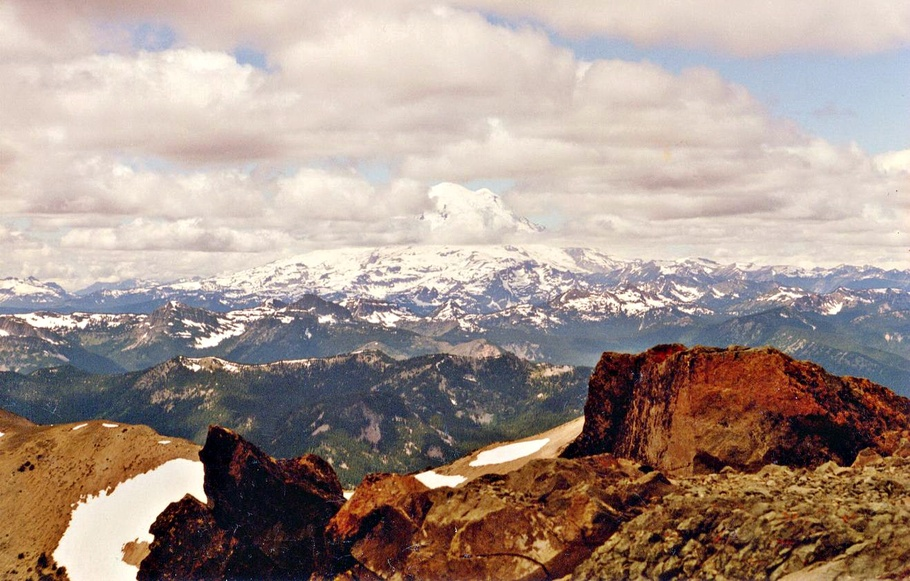
Mount Aix summit view of Rainier

== See also ==
- List of mountain peaks of Washington (state)
