= American River (Washington) =

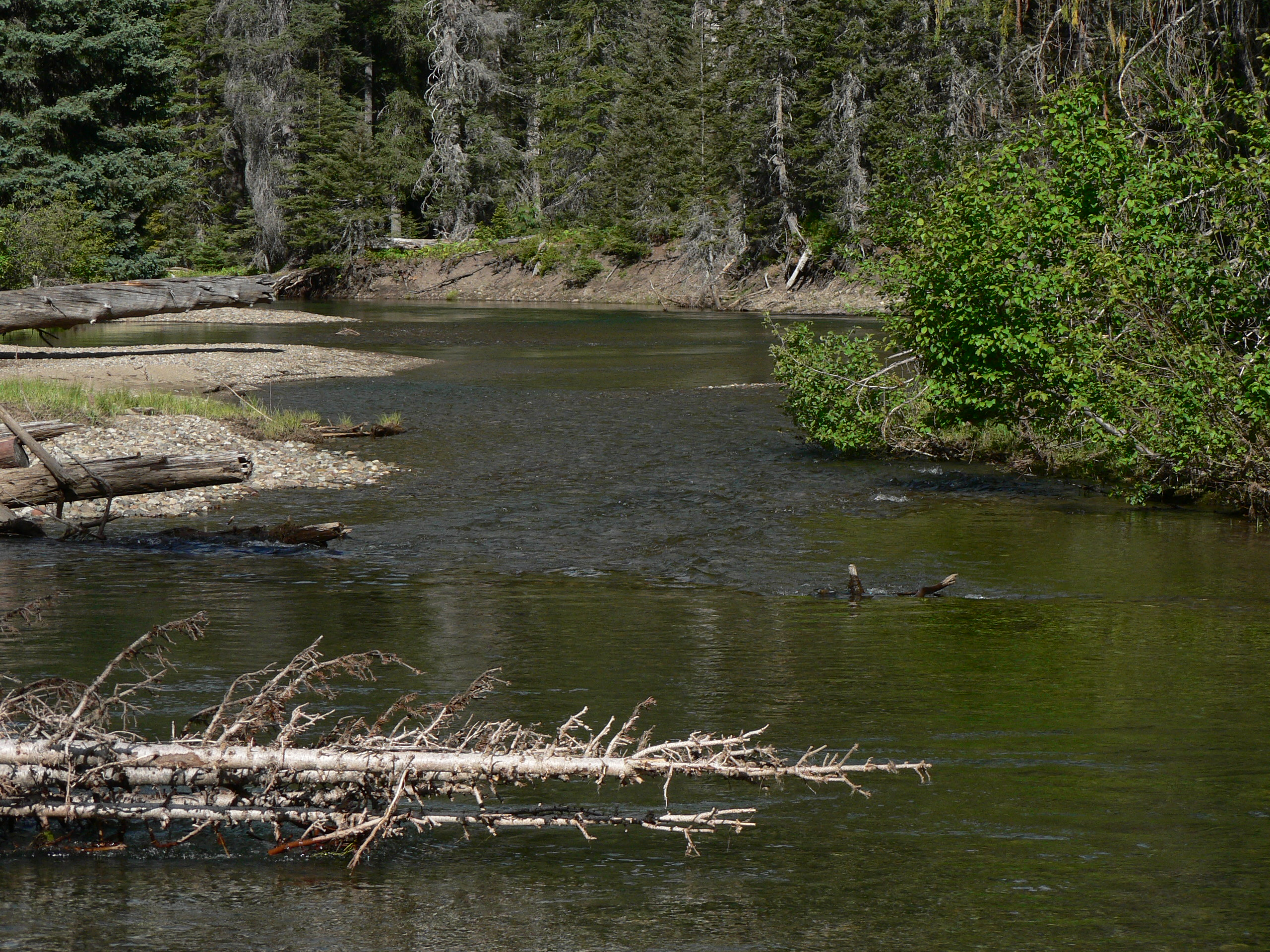
- The American River along Cougar Lake Trail in the William O. Douglas Wilderness

- Location of the mouth of the American River in Washington American River (Washington) (the United States)

Location
- Country: United States
- State: Washington
- Region: Yakima County

Physical characteristics
- Source: Cascade Range
  - coordinates: 46°49′10″N 121°27′36″W
  - elevation: 5,241 ft (1,597 m)
- Mouth: Bumping River
  - coordinates: 46°58′31″N 121°9′24″W
  - elevation: 2,765 ft (843 m)
- Length: 20 mi (32 km)
- Discharge
  - location: USGS gage 12488500 at river mile 0.5
  - average: 233 cu ft/s (6.6 m^{3}/s)
  - minimum: 15 cu ft/s (0.42 m^{3}/s)
  - maximum: 6,280 cu ft/s (178 m^{3}/s)

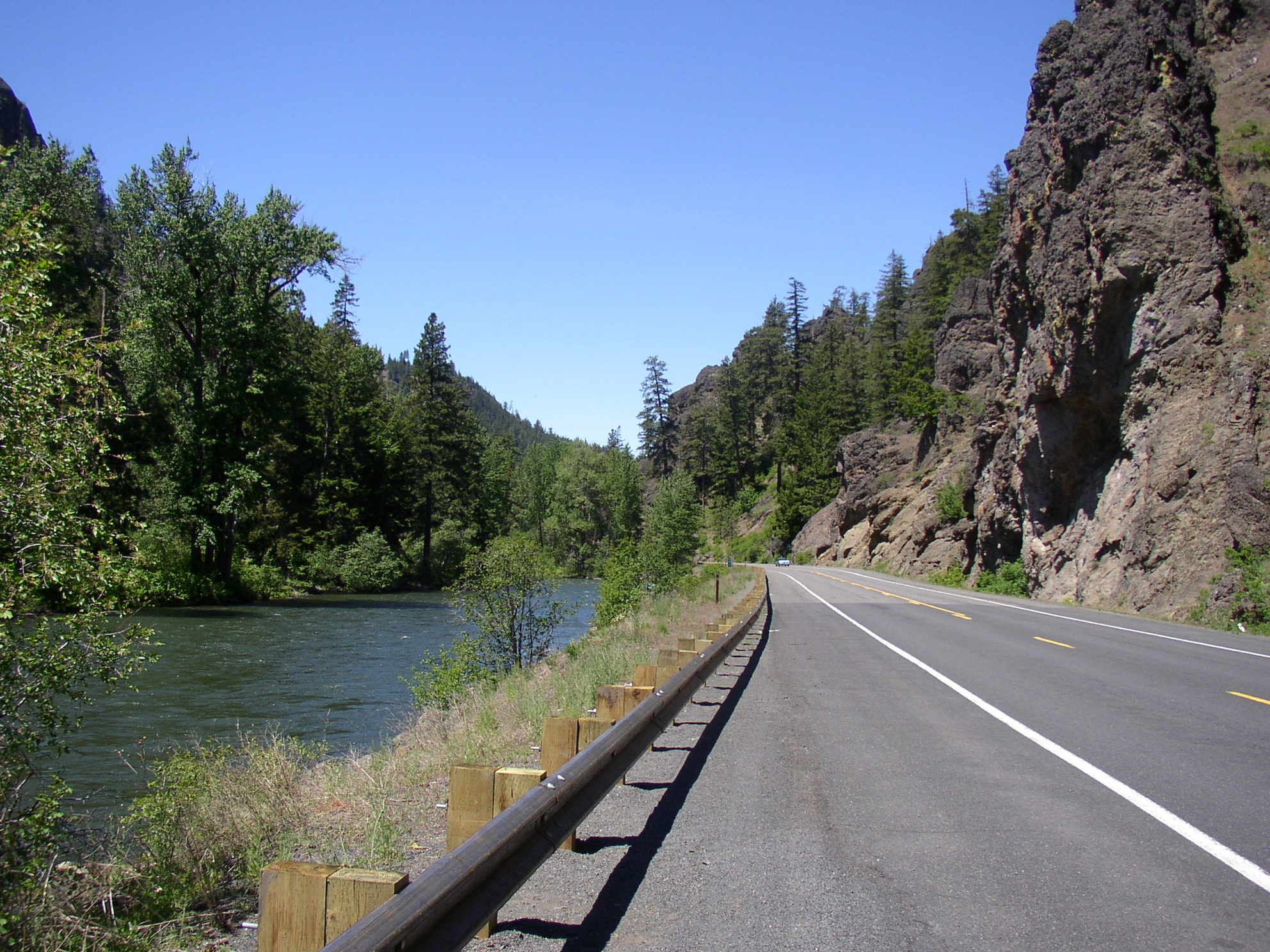
The American River seen from State Route 410

The American River is a tributary of the Bumping River in Washington. It flows down the east side of the Cascade Range, through Wenatchee National Forest and the William O. Douglas Wilderness.

The American River is part of the Columbia River basin, via the Bumping, Naches, and Yakima rivers.

From its source at American Lake, it flows north for several miles, picking up its tributary the Rainier Fork American River, which flows east down from the vicinity of Chinook Pass. State Route 410 crossing Chinook Pass from Mount Rainier National Park, then follows the Rainier Fork and the American River valleys.

After its confluence with Rainier Fork, the American River flows through Pleasant Valley. It joins the Bumping River within the American Forks Campground.

An early name for the American River was Miners Creek. According to historian Gretta Gossett, the river was renamed for the American River in California, "by hopeful miners".

== See also ==
- List of rivers of Washington (state)
- List of tributaries of the Columbia River
