= White Pass (Washington) =

Mountain pass in Washington, United States

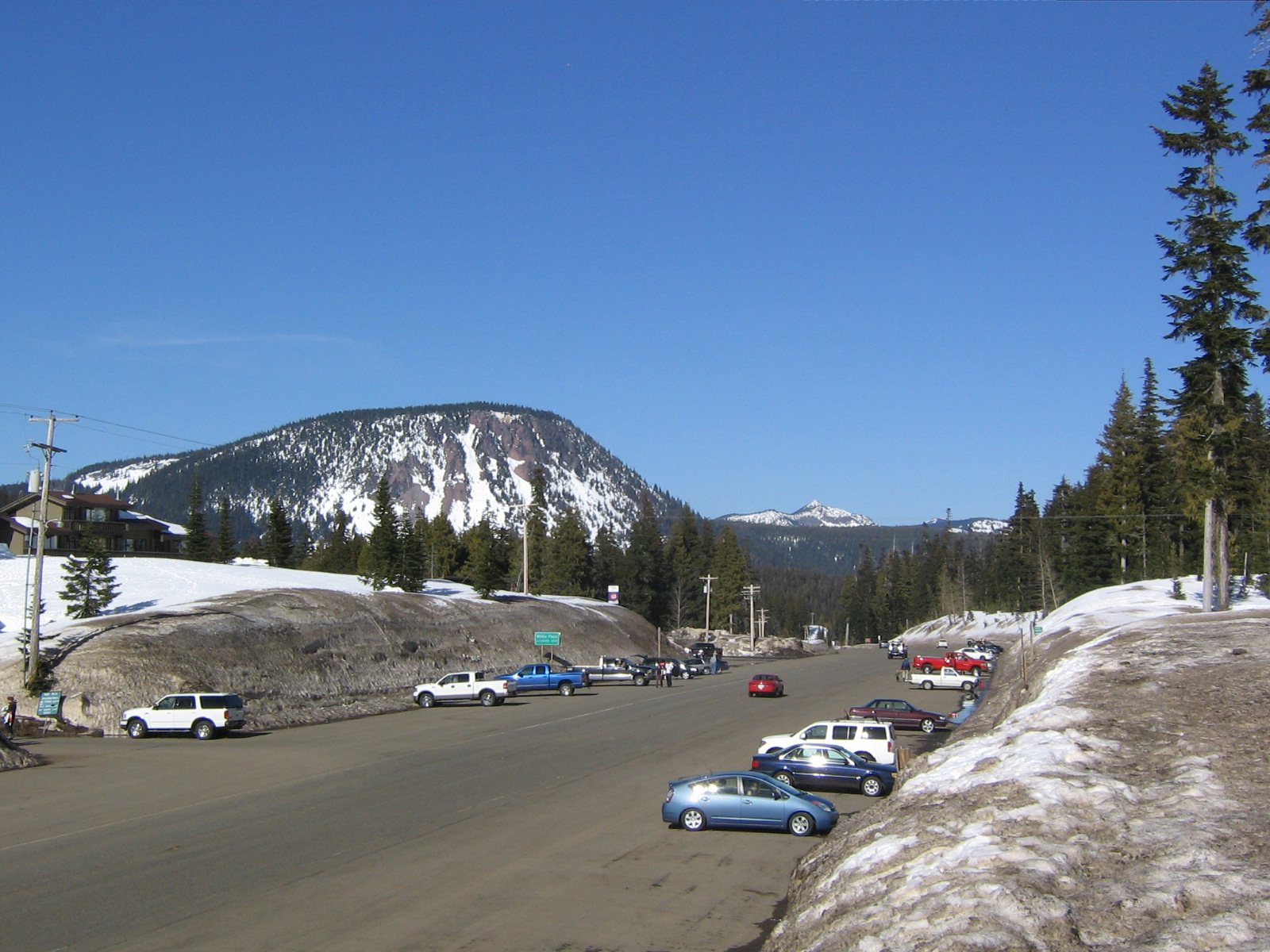
- U.S. 12 through White Pass. Spiral Butte is visible on the left.

- Location within the United States Location within Washington (state)
- Elevation: 4,500 ft (1,400 m)
- Traversed by: U.S. Highway 12

Third Approach
- Location: Lewis / Yakima counties, Washington, U.S.
- Range: Cascades
- Coordinates: 46°38.3′N 121°23.4′W

White Pass (elev. 4,500 feet (1,372 m)) is a mountain pass in the northwest United States, in the Cascade Range of Washington, southeast of Mount Rainier and north of Goat Rocks. U.S. Highway 12 travels over White Pass, connecting Yakima County on the east with Lewis County. It was named after Charles A. White, a surveying engineer who led the party that discovered it for the Northern Pacific Railroad in 1878.

A shortcut route across White Pass between Packwood and Naches was first established as State Road 5 in 1931, and the link was completed in August 1951 along the current route, later designated U.S. Route 12.

White Pass Ski Area, at the summit, opened on January 11, 1953. Champion ski racing twins Phil and Steve Mahre, along with their family, grew up on White Pass where their father Dave Mahre was the mountain manager for the ski area. White Pass is also the home mountain of professional snowboarder Marc Frank Montoya, owner of the Block Hotels.

As the crow flies, the pass is approximately 25 miles (40 km) southeast of the summit of Mount Rainier and 30 miles (50 km) north of Mount Adams.

On October 7, 2007, a single-engine Cessna Caravan crashed near White Pass while carrying skydivers; all ten people aboard died in the crash.

== Climate ==
Climate data for White Pass, Washington, 1991–2020 normals: 4440ft (1353m)
Month	Jan	Feb	Mar	Apr	May	Jun	Jul	Aug	Sep	Oct	Nov	Dec	Year
Mean daily maximum °F (°C)	31.1 (−0.5)	32.6 (0.3)	37.3 (2.9)	42.6 (5.9)	50.7 (10.4)	58.2 (14.6)	68.6 (20.3)	68.2 (20.1)	60.0 (15.6)	46.5 (8.1)	35.8 (2.1)	30.1 (−1.1)	46.8 (8.2)
Daily mean °F (°C)	26.9 (−2.8)	27.5 (−2.5)	31.3 (−0.4)	35.8 (2.1)	42.4 (5.8)	48.9 (9.4)	57.4 (14.1)	57.4 (14.1)	51.0 (10.6)	40.3 (4.6)	31.7 (−0.2)	26.2 (−3.2)	39.7 (4.3)
Mean daily minimum °F (°C)	22.8 (−5.1)	22.5 (−5.3)	25.7 (−3.5)	28.9 (−1.7)	34.2 (1.2)	39.6 (4.2)	46.3 (7.9)	46.6 (8.1)	41.8 (5.4)	34.1 (1.2)	27.6 (−2.4)	22.3 (−5.4)	32.7 (0.4)
Average precipitation inches (mm)	7.84 (199)	5.29 (134)	5.03 (128)	2.59 (66)	1.80 (46)	1.15 (29)	0.34 (8.6)	0.45 (11)	1.37 (35)	4.17 (106)	6.92 (176)	8.40 (213)	45.35 (1,151.6)
Source 1: XMACIS2
Source 2: NOAA (Precipitation)

Pigtail Peak, lies above White Pass and is within the White Pass Ski Area.

Climate data for Pigtail Peak, Washington, 1991–2020 normals: 5800ft (1768m)
Month	Jan	Feb	Mar	Apr	May	Jun	Jul	Aug	Sep	Oct	Nov	Dec	Year
Mean daily maximum °F (°C)	32.2 (0.1)	33.1 (0.6)	36.4 (2.4)	41.8 (5.4)	49.4 (9.7)	53.7 (12.1)	62.8 (17.1)	62.7 (17.1)	56.6 (13.7)	44.8 (7.1)	35.7 (2.1)	31.1 (−0.5)	45.0 (7.2)
Daily mean °F (°C)	26.9 (−2.8)	26.7 (−2.9)	29.1 (−1.6)	33.5 (0.8)	40.8 (4.9)	45.1 (7.3)	53.3 (11.8)	53.5 (11.9)	48.5 (9.2)	38.3 (3.5)	30.4 (−0.9)	25.9 (−3.4)	37.7 (3.2)
Mean daily minimum °F (°C)	21.6 (−5.8)	20.4 (−6.4)	21.8 (−5.7)	25.3 (−3.7)	32.3 (0.2)	36.6 (2.6)	43.7 (6.5)	44.3 (6.8)	40.3 (4.6)	31.9 (−0.1)	25.1 (−3.8)	20.7 (−6.3)	30.3 (−0.9)
Average precipitation inches (mm)	12.49 (317)	9.90 (251)	10.40 (264)	6.55 (166)	4.18 (106)	2.72 (69)	0.82 (21)	1.04 (26)	2.76 (70)	7.10 (180)	11.26 (286)	12.28 (312)	81.5 (2,068)
Source 1: XMACIS2
Source 2: NOAA (Precipitation)

== See also ==
Media related to White Pass (Washington) at Wikimedia Commons

- List of geographic features in Lewis County, Washington
