= Crystal Peak (Washington) =

Mountain in Washington (state), United States

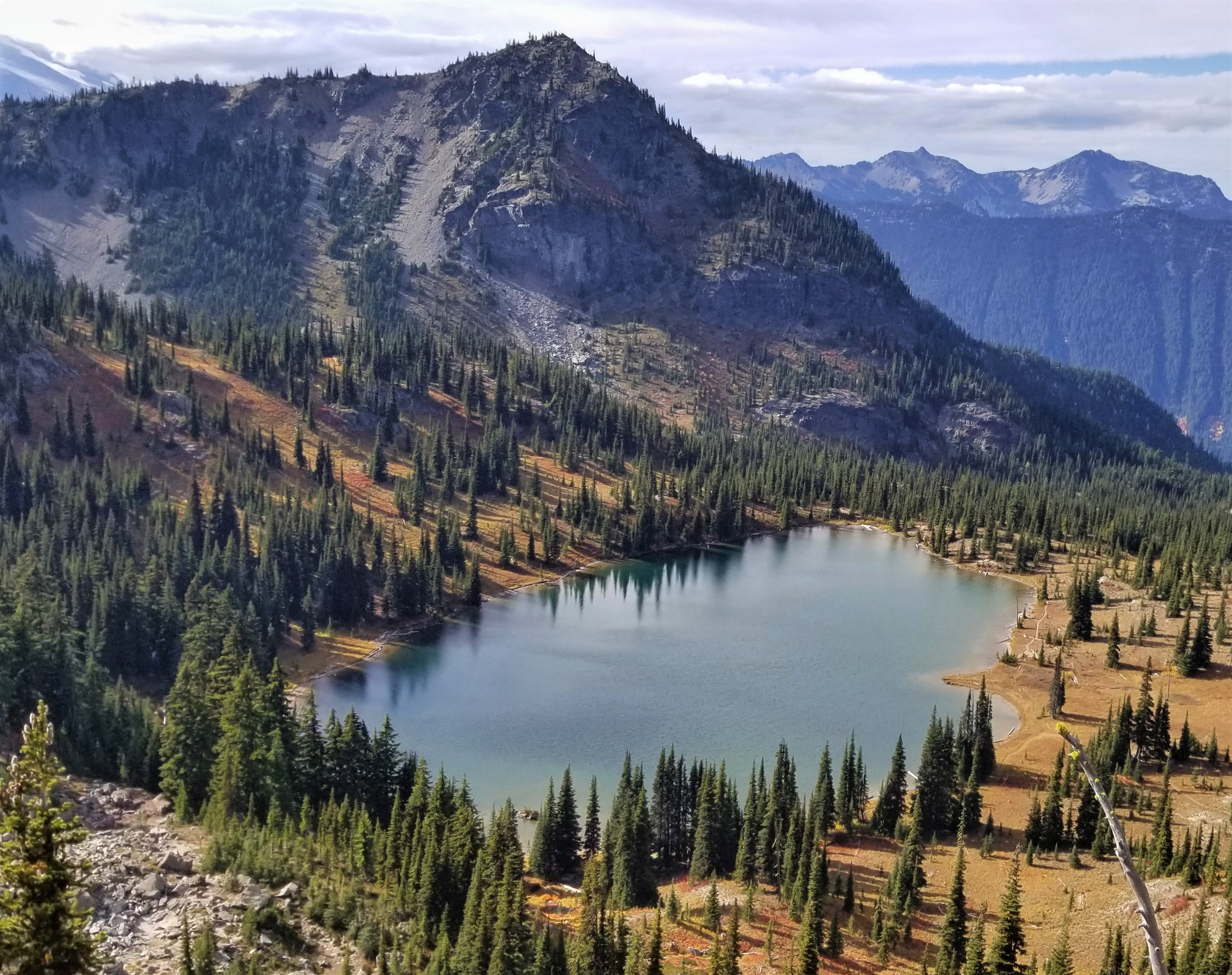
- East aspect, with Crystal Lake

Highest point
- Elevation: 6,595 ft (2,010 m)
- Prominence: 275 ft (84 m)
- Parent peak: Chinook Peak
- Isolation: 0.75 mi (1.21 km)
- Coordinates: 46°54′22″N 121°31′09″W

Geography
- Location within Washington (state) Location within the United States
- Country: United States
- State: Washington
- County: Pierce
- Protected area: Mount Rainier National Park
- Parent range: Cascades
- Topo map: USGS White River Park

Climbing
- Easiest route: Hiking trail

Crystal Peak is a 6,595-foot (2,010 meter) summit located in eastern Mount Rainier National Park, in Pierce County of Washington state. Crystal Peak is situated 0.75 mi (1.21 km) northwest of Chinook Peak, and nearly on the crest of the Cascade Range. Crystal Mountain and Crystal Lakes lie immediately to the northeast, and Three Way Peak is 1.09 mi (1.75 km) to the east. Access to the summit (which was a former fire lookout site) is via a hiking trail which branches off from the Crystal Lakes Trail. That trailhead starts along Highway 410, which traverses the western base of the mountain. Precipitation runoff from Crystal Peak drains into tributaries of the White River.

== Climate ==
Crystal Peak is located in the marine west coast climate zone of western North America. Most weather fronts originating in the Pacific Ocean travel northeast toward the Cascade Mountains. As fronts approach, they are forced upward by the peaks of the Cascade Range (orographic lift), causing them to drop their moisture in the form of rain or snow onto the Cascades. As a result, the west side of the Cascades experiences high precipitation, especially during the winter months in the form of snowfall. Because of maritime influence, snow tends to be wet and heavy, resulting in high avalanche danger. During winter months, weather is usually cloudy, but due to high pressure systems over the Pacific Ocean that intensify during summer months, there is often little or no cloud cover during the summer. The months of July through September offer the most favorable weather for viewing or climbing this peak.

== Gallery ==
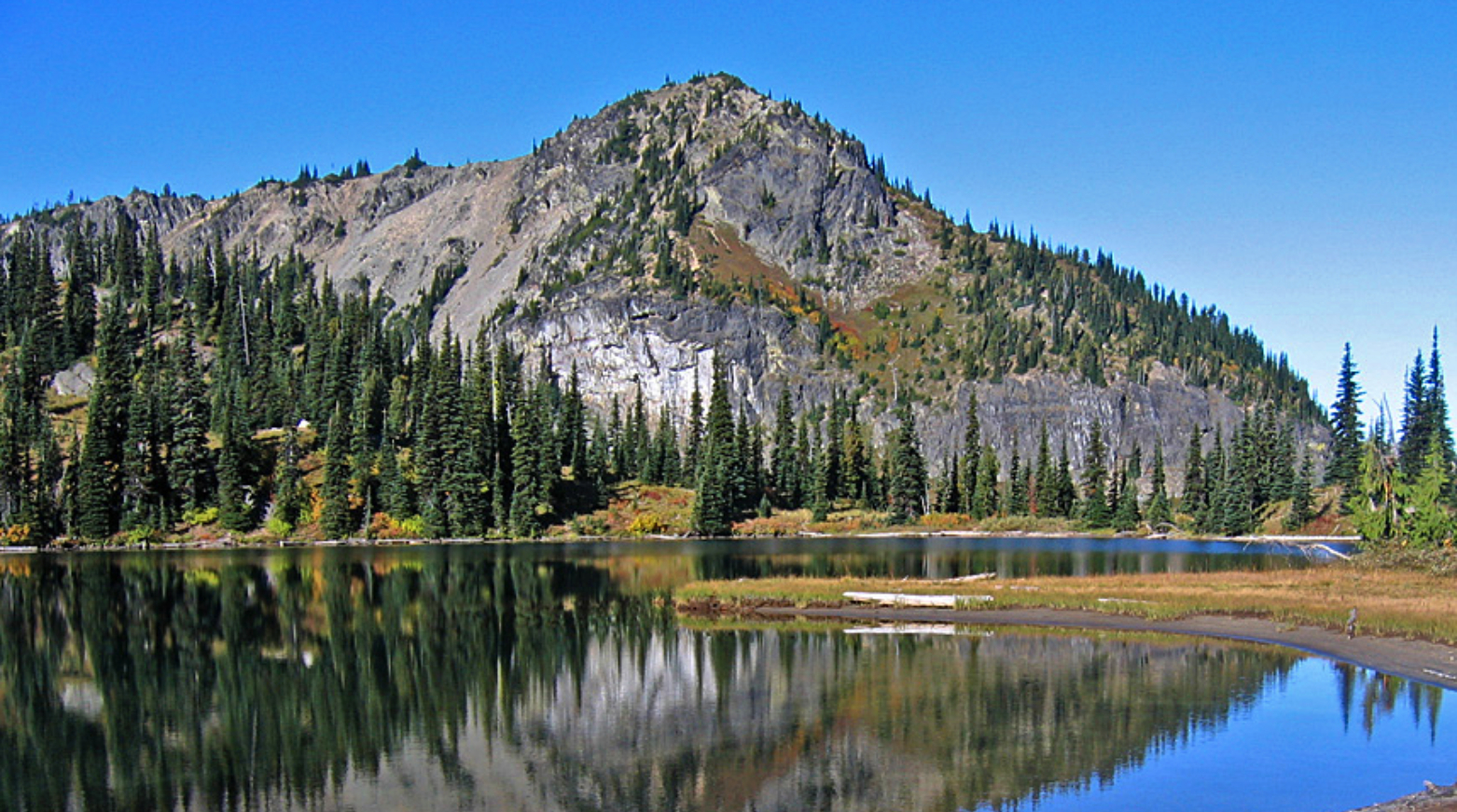
Crystal Peak seen from Upper Crystal Lake

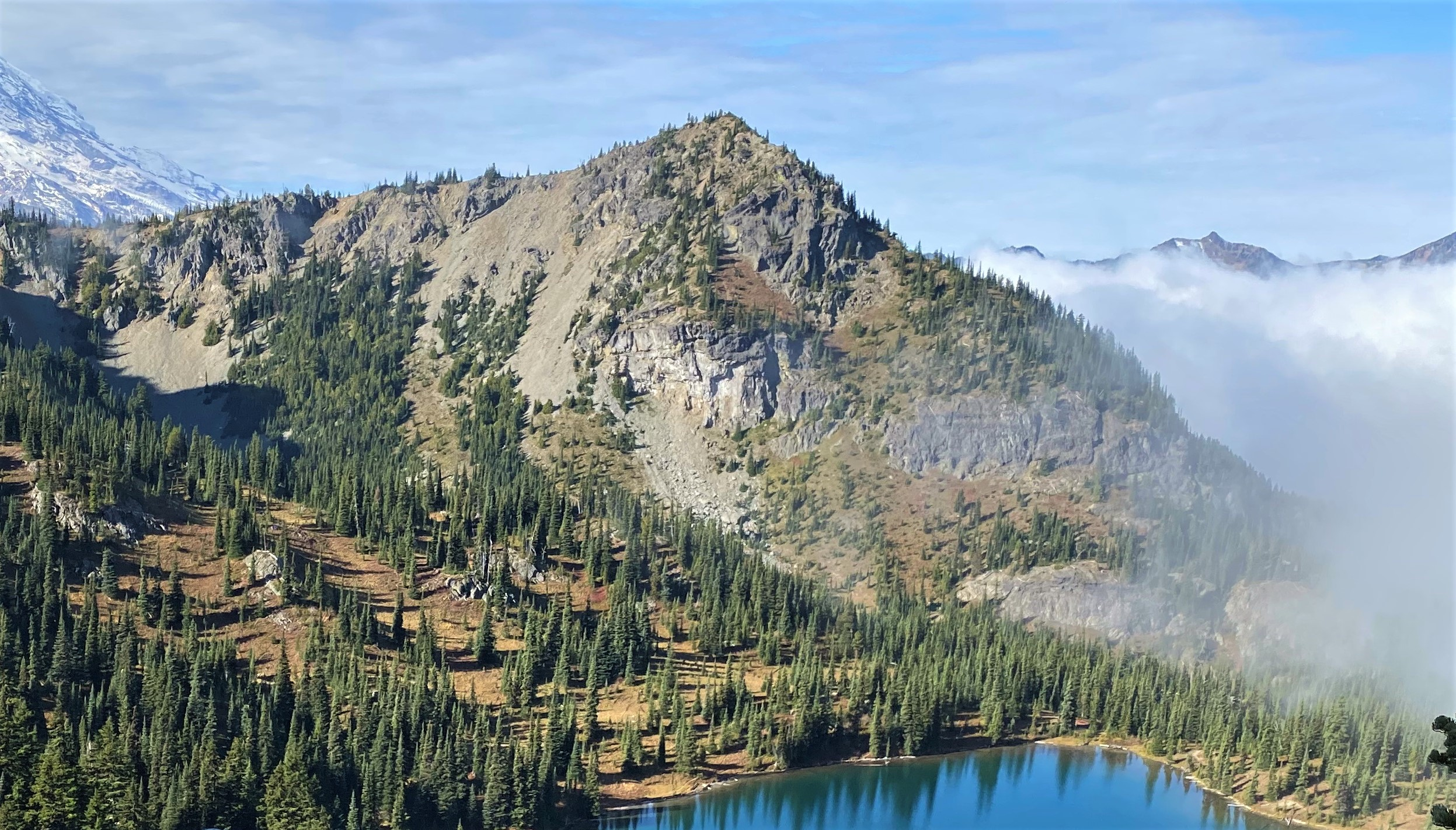
East aspect

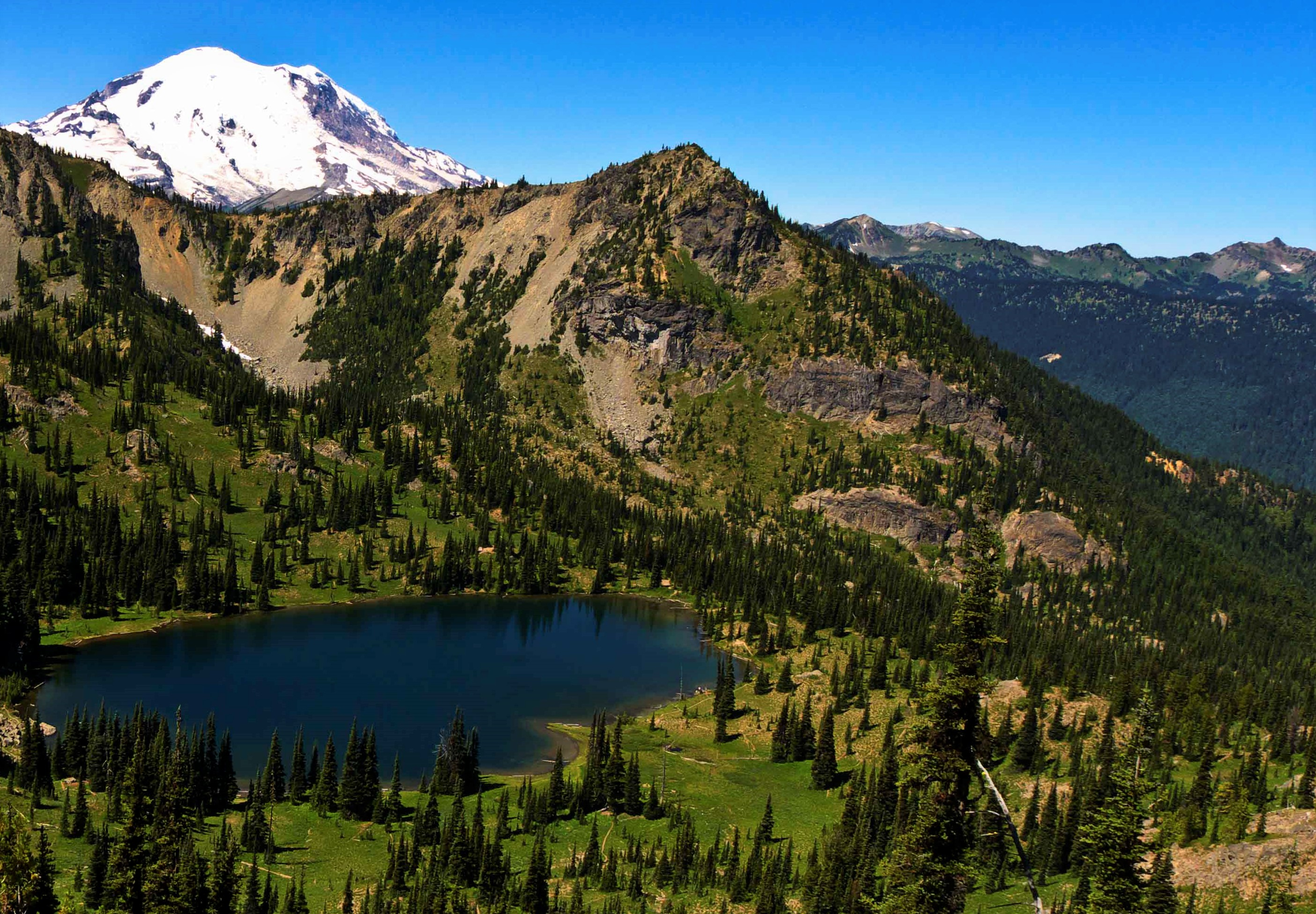
Crystal Peak with Mt. Rainier upper left

== See also ==
- Geography of Washington (state)
- Geology of the Pacific Northwest
