= Chinook Peak =

Mountain in Washington (state), United States

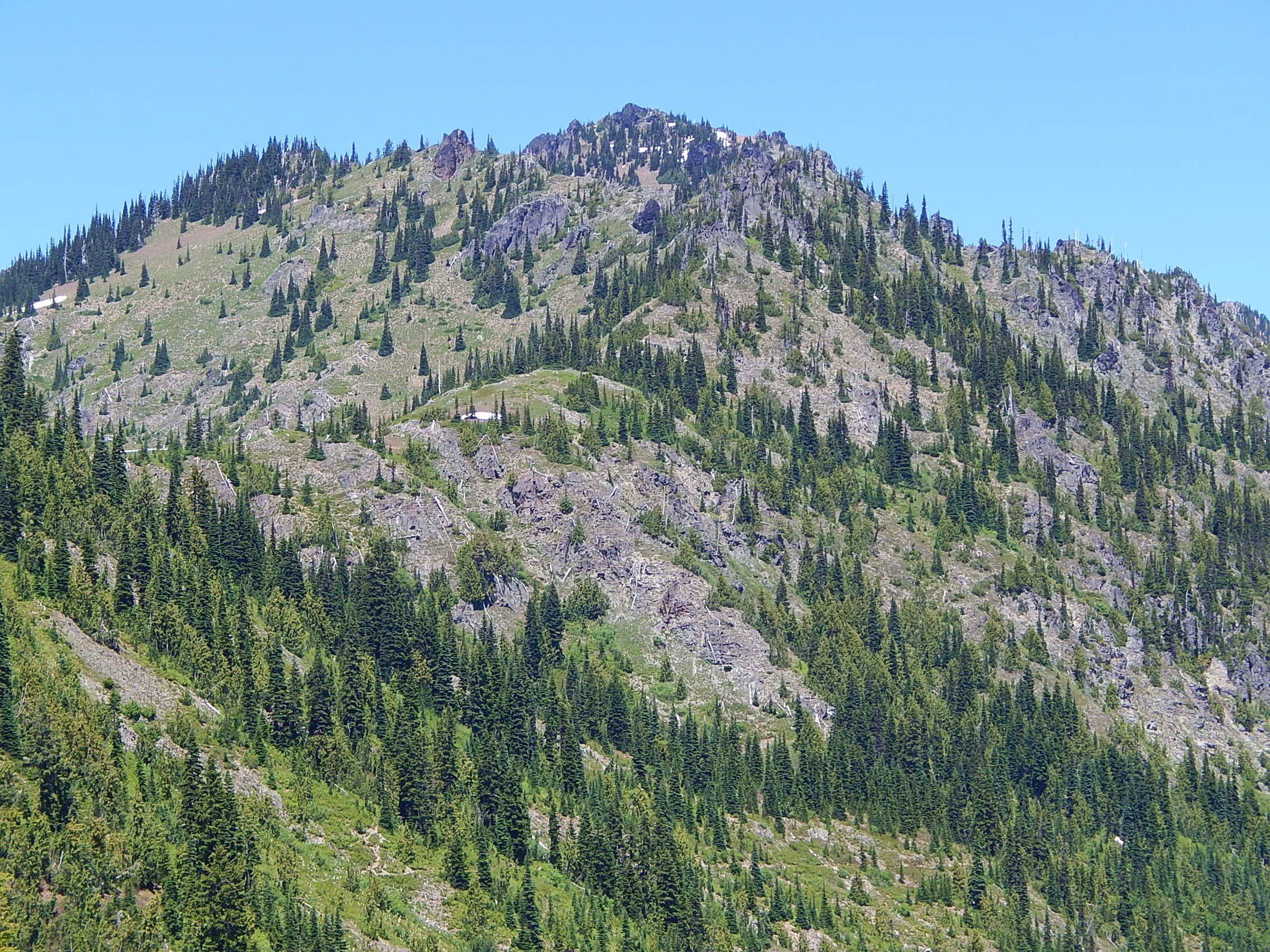
- Chinook Peak seen from Chinook Pass

Highest point
- Elevation: 6,904 ft (2,104 m)
- Prominence: 504 ft (154 m)
- Parent peak: Crystal Mountain
- Isolation: 1.33 mi (2.14 km)
- Coordinates: 46°53′50″N 121°30′37″W

Geography
- Location within Washington (state) Location within the United States
- Country: United States
- State: Washington
- County: Pierce / Yakima
- Protected area: Mount Rainier National Park
- Parent range: Cascades
- Topo map: USGS White River Park

Climbing
- Easiest route: Scrambling class 3

Chinook Peak is a 6,904-foot (2,104 m) summit located on the eastern border of Mount Rainier National Park. It is also on the shared border of Pierce County and Yakima County in Washington state. Chinook Peak is situated north of Chinook Pass on the crest of the Cascade Range. Its nearest higher peak is Crystal Mountain, 1.31 miles (2.11 km) to the north. Crystal Peak lies 0.75 miles (1.21 km) to the northwest, and Cupalo Rock is 1.0 mile (1.6 km) to the east-northeast. Precipitation runoff from Chinook Peak drains into tributaries of the White River and Yakima River.

== Climate ==
Antler Peak is located in the marine west coast climate zone of western North America. Most weather fronts originating in the Pacific Ocean travel northeast toward the Cascade Mountains. As fronts approach, they are forced upward by the peaks of the Cascade Range (orographic lift), causing them to drop their moisture in the form of rain or snow onto the Cascades. As a result, the west side of the Cascades experiences high precipitation, especially during the winter months in the form of snowfall. Because of maritime influence, snow tends to be wet and heavy, resulting in high avalanche danger. During winter months, weather is usually cloudy, but due to high pressure systems over the Pacific Ocean that intensify during summer months, there is often little or no cloud cover during the summer.

== See also ==
- Geology of the Pacific Northwest

== Gallery ==
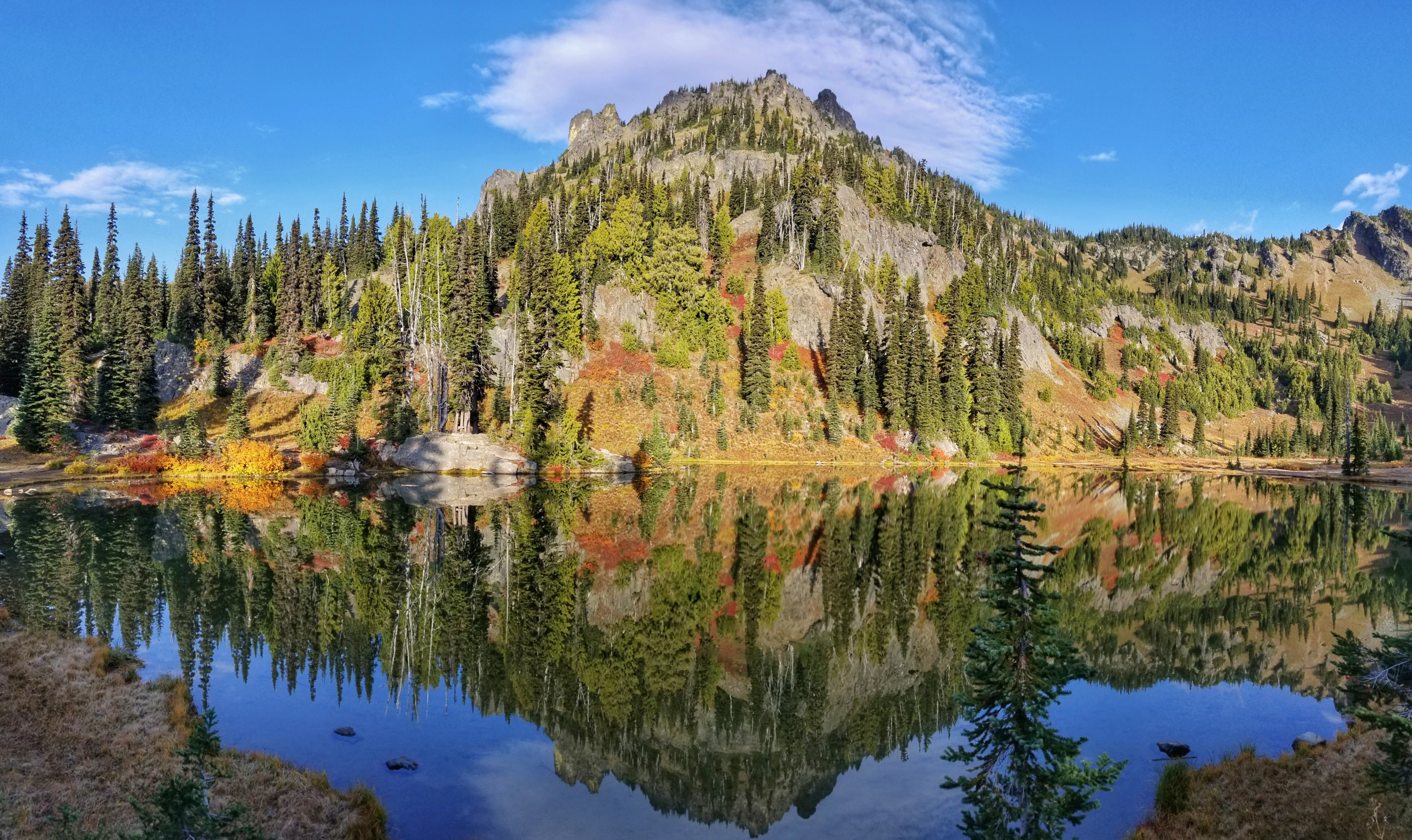
Southeast aspect reflected in Sheep Lake

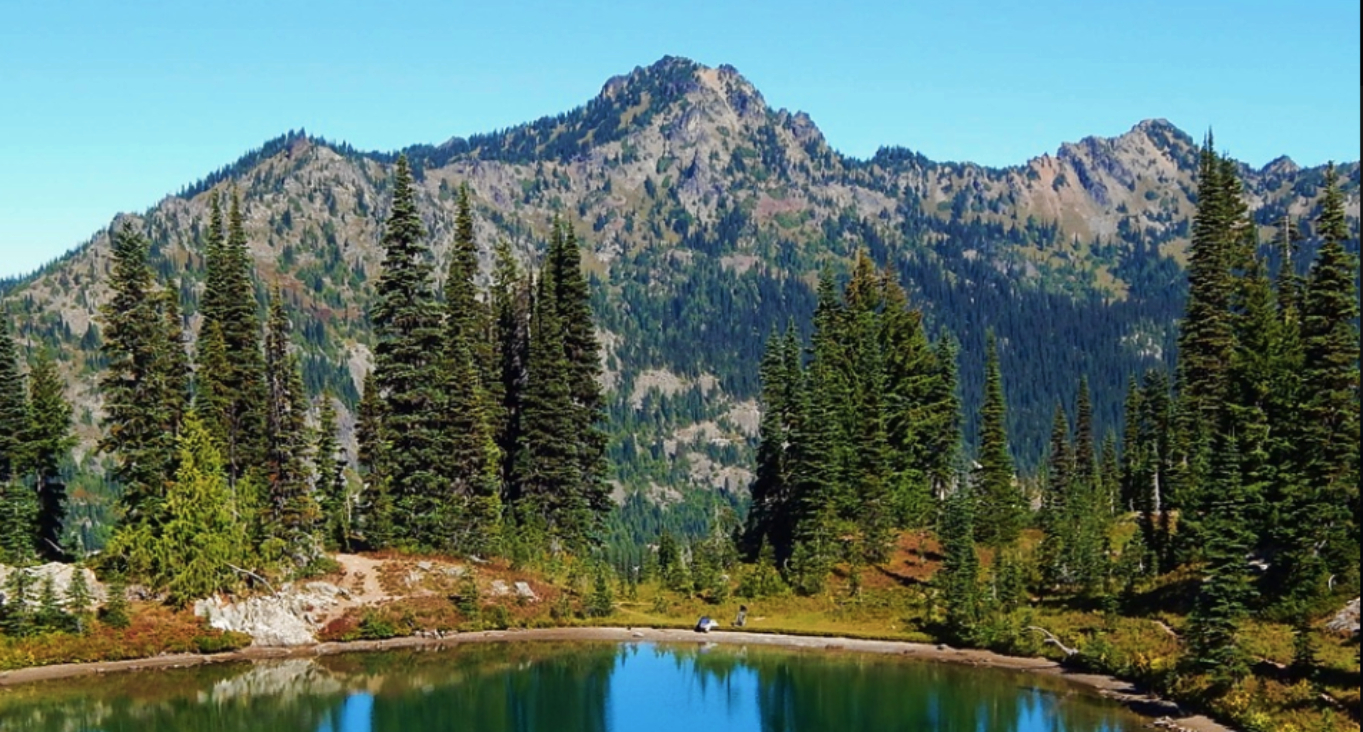
from a tarn along the Pacific Crest Trail near Naches Peak

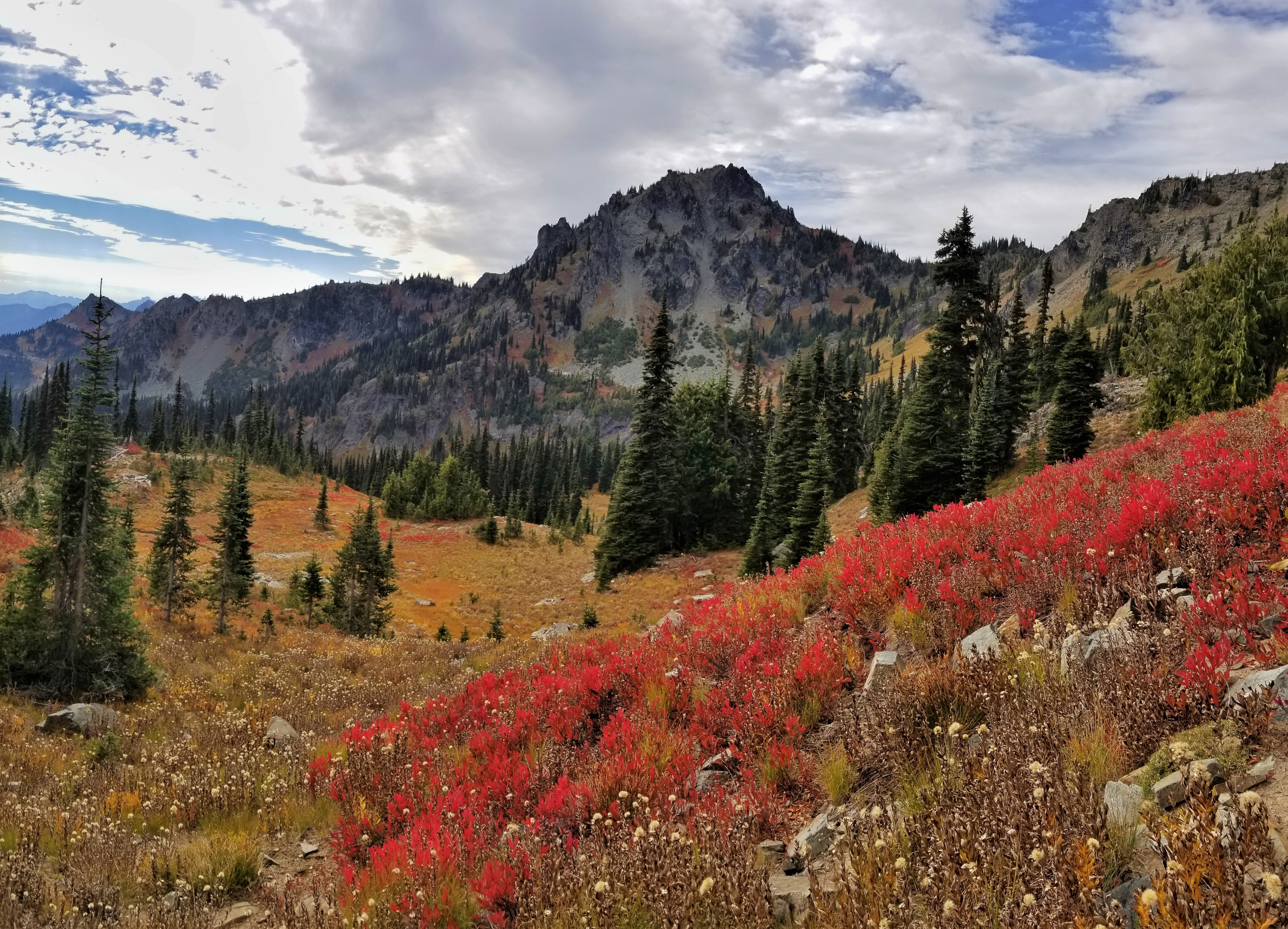
Chinook Peak, east aspect

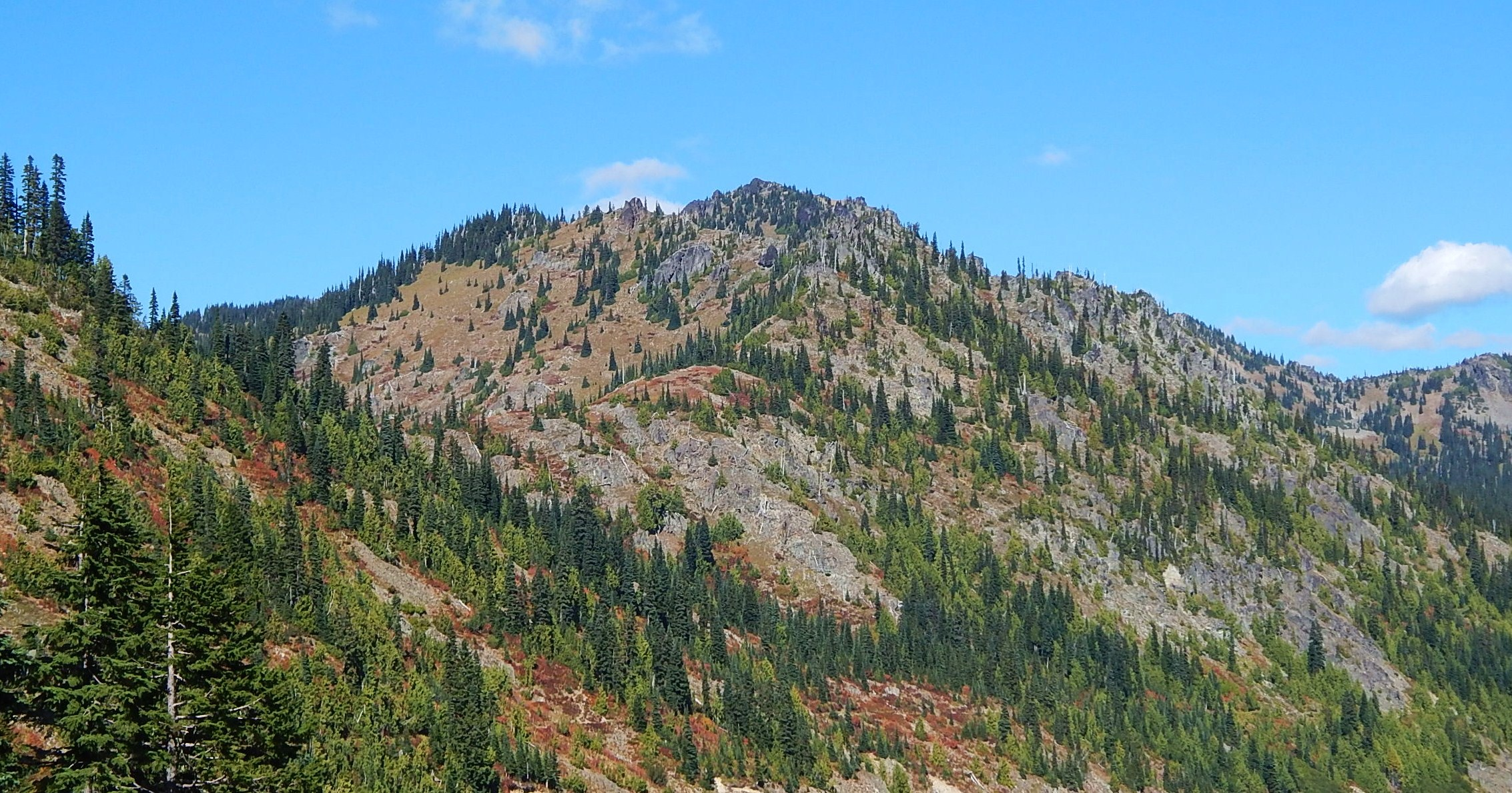
from Chinook Pass

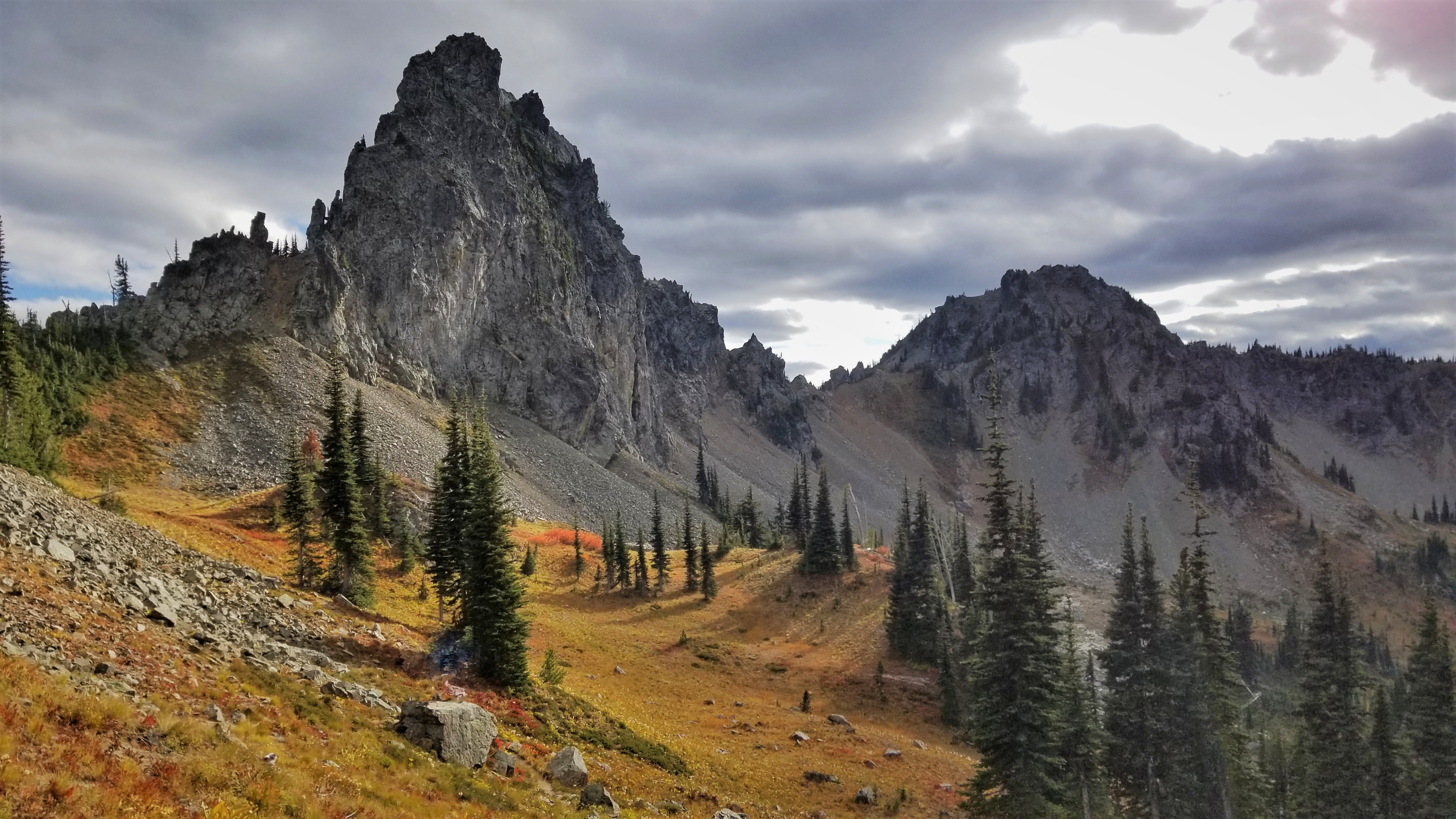
Peak 6708 (left) and Chinook Peak from north
