= Marc Frank Montoya =

American professional snowboarder (born 1974)

Personal information
- Born: June 13, 1974 (age 52) Denver, Colorado, U.S.

Sport
- Country: (United States) USA
- Sport: Snowboarding

Marc Frank Montoya (born June 13, 1974) is an American professional snowboarder.

== Biography ==
Montoya grew up in suburban Denver, Colorado. He started snowboarding as a winter pastime for skateboarding. Montoya embraces his urban roots, which many deem refreshing in a sport generally ruled by young suburbanites. He is the first Mexican-American professional snowboarder to make his way from inner-city Denver, and is the only major Latino snowboarder on the circuit. He has been featured in nearly 300 pages of industry coverage since turning pro. Montoya was named "Rock Star of the Year" in the 2004 Transworld Magazine Rider's Poll and was ranked third on Snowboard Magazine's list of the top 10 Riders of 2005. He is best known for his urban style and his park riding, particularly rails. He is also instrumental in developing various snowboarding brands and products and has several products with his sponsors. He has a pro board and bindings with Technine, goggles with Spy Optics, boots with Nitro and his own headphones with Skullcandy. He is a primary stakeholder in many successful snowboard industry companies from technology to hospitality. In addition, he opened his own chain of snowboarding related hotels, called The Block, which closed in 2009 due to tax issues.

== Video Appearances ==
He is featured in Absinthe Films' snowboarding videos, including More in 2006, and Optimistic? in 2007. He has also been included in Technine videos.
