= White Pass Ski Area =

Ski area in Washington, United States

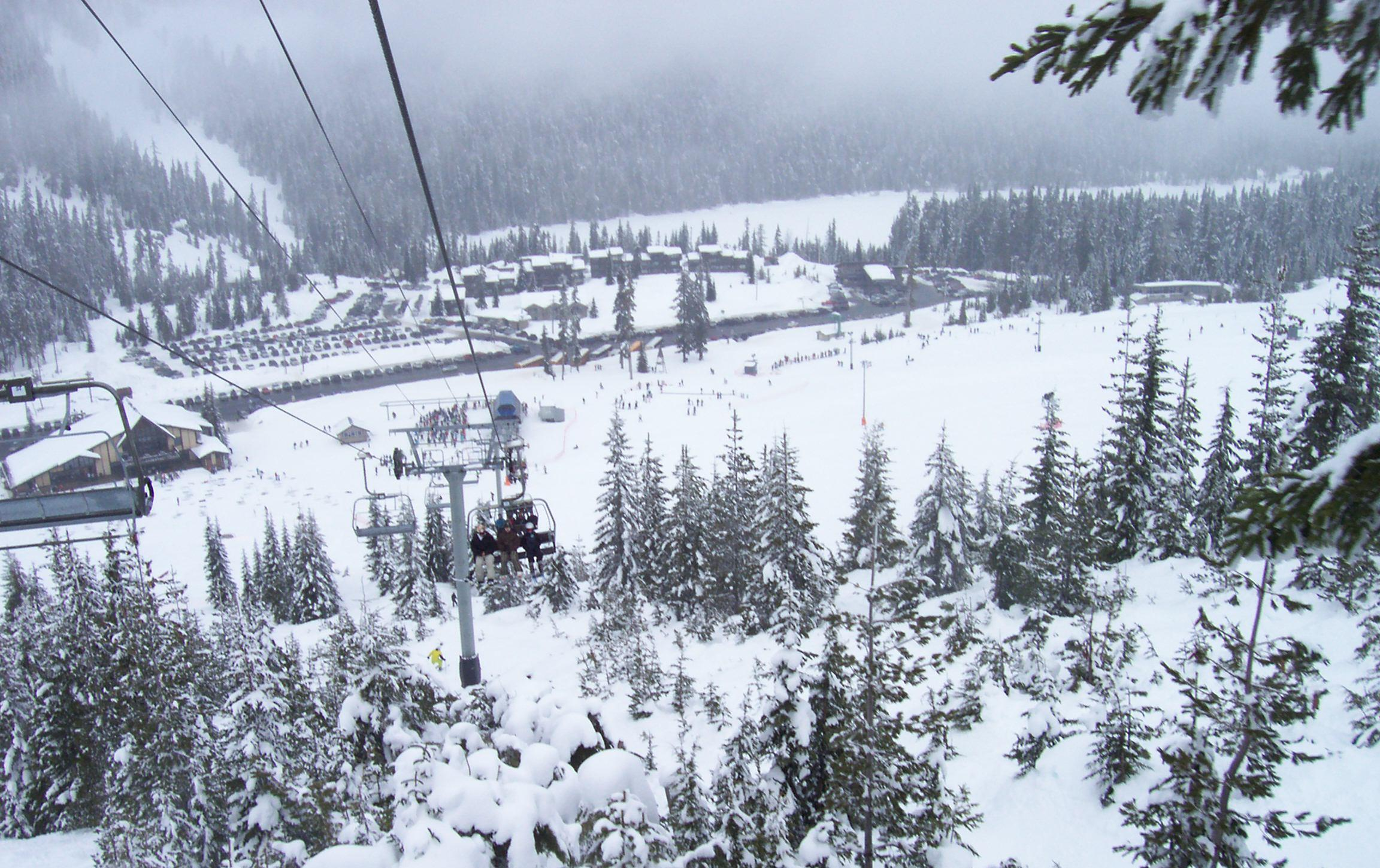
- Looking northward, down the liftline, in 2010

- Location in the United States Location in Washington
- Location: White Pass, Washington
- Nearest city: Yakima - 53 miles (85 km); Morton - 54 miles (87 km)
- Coordinates: 46.638°N 121.391°W
- Vertical: 2,000 ft (610 m)
- Top elevation: 6,500 ft (1,980 m)
- Base elevation: 4,500 ft (1,370 m)
- Skiable area: 1,402 acres (5.7 km^{2})
- Trails: 45: 30% Beginner; 50% Intermediate; 20% Advanced
- Lift system: 5 chairlifts, 2 hi-speed quads; 2 fixed quads; 1 triple; 3 magic carpet
- Lift capacity: 9,700 / hr
- Snowfall: 350 in (29 ft; 890 cm)
- Snowmaking: At base area on Far East and Poma Face
- Night skiing: limited: Saturdays & holidays
- Website: skiwhitepass.com

The White Pass Ski Area is a ski area in the Pacific Northwest of the United States, in the Cascade Range at White Pass in the state of Washington. It is located 53 miles (90 km) west of Yakima on U.S. Route 12, and 53 miles (90 km) east of Morton. As the crow flies, the pass is 25 miles (40 km) southeast of the summit of Mount Rainier and 30 miles (50 km) north of Mount Adams.

== Alpine skiing ==
The base elevation of White Pass is at 4,500 feet (1,370 m) above sea level, with a lift-served summit at 6,500 feet (1,980 m), yielding a vertical drop of 2,000 feet (610 m). Located on the south side of the east-west highway, the slopes primarily face north.

The mountain has five chairlifts: two high speed quads, two fixed-grip quads, and one triple. It also includes 3 magic carpets for beginning skiers. There are also 2 terrain parks with Progression Park being located off of Far East Triple that occasionally features a short half pipe and the more difficult Ribeye located off the Basin Quad that regularly features rail jams, slopestyle, and other obstacles.

== Cross-country skiing ==
The Nordic Center provides access to a variety of groomed, double-tracked cross-country ski, trails in the Wenatchee and Gifford Pinchot National Forests. The terrain challenges all ability levels in classic cross-county, skating cross-country, snowshoeing, and fat biking on 26 km (16 mi) of maintained trails. Gear for all activities offered is available for rental at the Nordic center yurt along with small snacks and refreshments.

== Base facilities ==
The day lodge has rental skis and boards, food, lockers, and a bar. Across the highway to the north, the White Pass Village Inn offers overnight accommodations. The base area also includes 2 restaurants, 3 bars and 3 convenience stores all spread throughout the mountain. There is also a Kracker Barrel which unlike the other facilities, operates year round offering small snacks, groceries, gas and more.

== History ==
White Pass Ski Area opened in January 1953. The initial area only consisted of the Poma Face hill serviced by a number of Rope tows. Shortly after, the ski area built a Poma surface lift that ran from roughly in front of the present day lodge's location to the top of the Poma Face.

In 1956, White Pass expanded to the summit of Pigtail Peak with its very first chairlift. Dubbed Pigtail I, the two-person lift was created by the Riblet Tramway Company of Spokane, Washington. It was a mile (1.6 km) in length, with a vertical rise of 1,500 feet (460 m) from the highway base area to 6,000 feet (1,830 m). The resort cut two long runs from the summit, which they named Holiday and Cascade. White Pass added its second double chairlift, Pigtail II, in the fall of 1958. Also built by Riblet, it ran in parallel with the original chair. This second chair had nearly 30% greater capacity (900 vs. 700/hr), with a more robust cable and gearbox. It also had 50% more lift towers, which were greater in height in anticipation of high snowfall. The installed cost of the second chair exceeded $200,000. The resort also widened Cascade and cut out two additional runs from the summit: Mach V and Paradise. The area started full-week operations for the 1958–59 season, with daily adult lift tickets priced at $3.50. In 1964, the area added a new Riblet double chairlift to the beginner area. Chair 3 ran from the highway on the east side of the resort to a flat area about a hundred yards below the base of Cascade Cliff.

In 1984, the ski area installed Chair 4, another double built by Riblet. This lift ran from roughly halfway down Paradise to the summit of Pigtail Peak. Additionally, the resort cut out three new runs around Paradise that ended at the new lift. Looking to increase capacity at the base area, White Pass installed a high-speed detachable lift that ran from the highway to the summit in 1994. Built by Doppelmayr, the Great White Express had nearly double the capacity of the two Pigtail lifts combined. The Poma surface lift and Pigtail I were removed to make room for Great White, though some of the Poma's towers were left on the hill as lighting for night skiing.

In 2000, White Pass overhauled the beginner area of the mountain. The last remaining rope tow was replaced with a Doppelmayr platterpull. Chair 3 was removed and a new Garaventa triple lift, following a different route, was installed. Beginning in a newly cut-out area to the east of the area, the Far East lift ended at the top of the Poma Face. The expansion in the Paradise Basin opened in the 2010–11 season and added 767 acres (3.1 km^{2}) of terrain and two new Doppelmayr chairlifts. The Basin Quad is a fixed-grip quad and the Couloir Express is the area's second high-speed detachable quad. The resort also constructed a new lodge between the new chairlifts.

In December 2021, the ski area was sold by White Pass Co. Inc. to a group of five Yakima-area businesspeople. In 2022, the new ownership group introduced an expanded beginners' area, more Nordic trails, and a ski patrol building. Future expansion is contingent on approval from the U.S. Forest Service.

In April 2025, White Pass began the replacement of chair #4, a 1983 Riblet double with a new fixed grip qaud built by Doppelmayr. The lift features a loading carpet at the bottom and will run the same length as the original lift. White Pass also began the development of a 2nd lodge at the base located near lot C oriented towards ski lessons.

=== Notable skiers ===
Former World Cup racing twins Phil and Steve Mahre grew up at White Pass along with their family, where their father Dave "Spike" Mahre was the mountain manager.

== Lifts ==
Pigtail II, previously one of the oldest operating chairlifts in North America, was removed during the summer of 2023. The new Yakima-based owners, who had recently purchased the resort, decommissioned Pigtail II and auctioned off the chairs to the community to help fund future projects.
