= William O. Douglas Wilderness =

Wilderness area in Washington, United States

- IUCN category Ib (wilderness area)
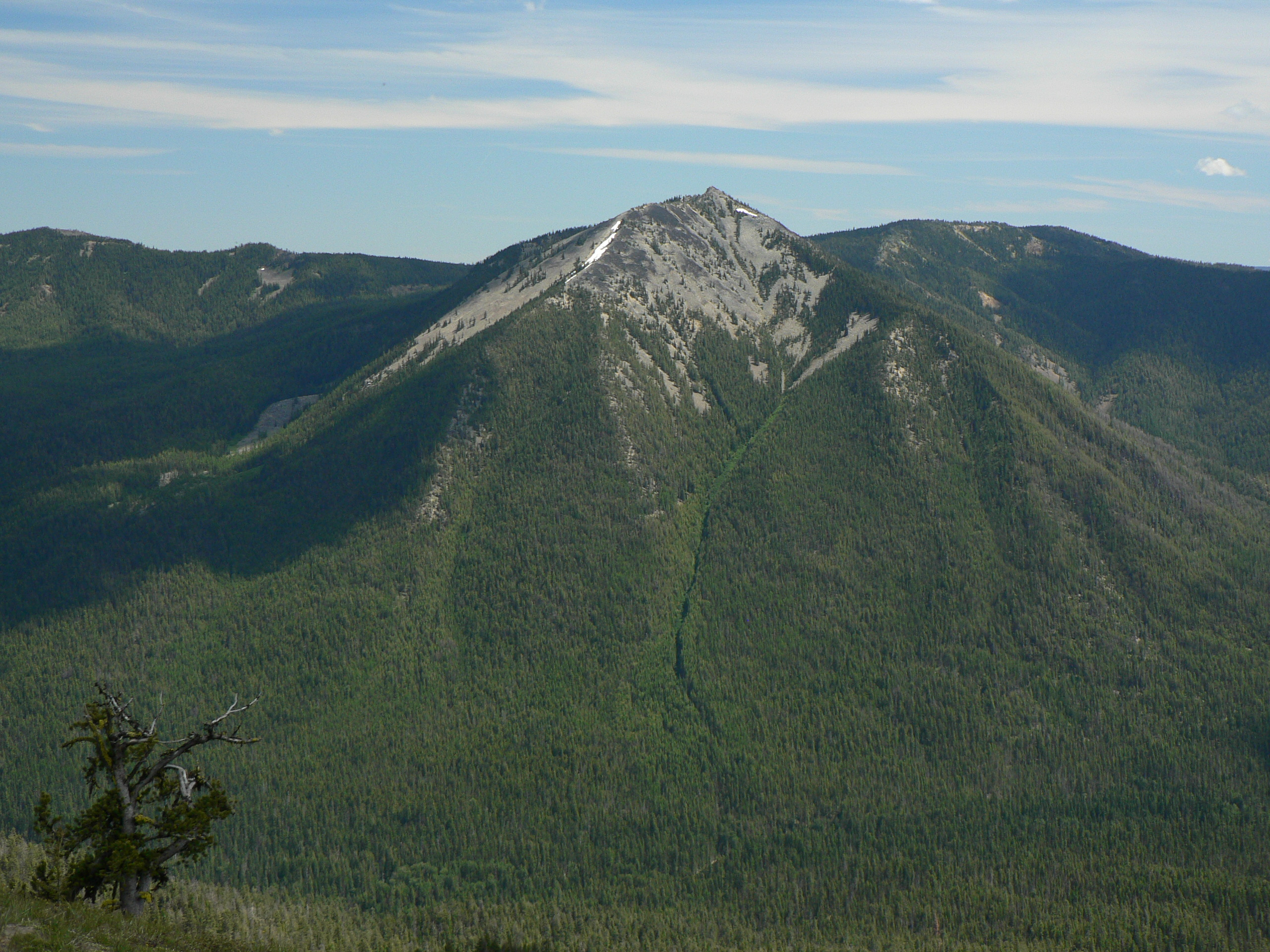
- Old Scab Mountain (6,080 feet (1,850 m)) viewed from American Ridge in eastern Douglas Wilderness

- Location within the United States
- Location: Yakima / Lewis counties, Washington, United States
- Nearest city: Yakima, Washington
- Coordinates: 46°48′19″N 121°18′54″W
- Area: 169,081 acres (68,425 ha)
- Established: 1984
- Governing body: U.S. Forest Service
- Website: William O. Douglas Wilderness

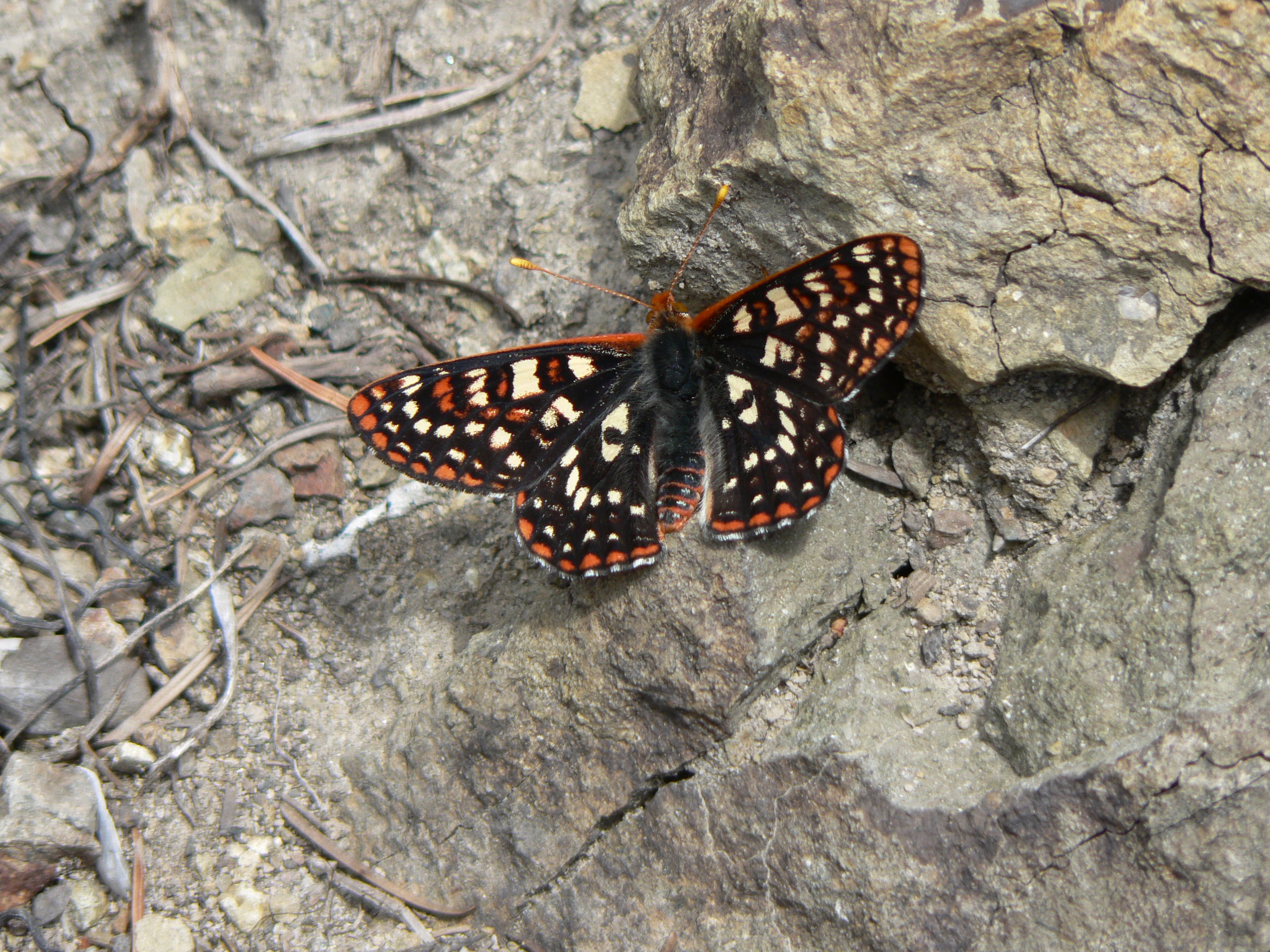
Variable checkerspot, a butterfly found in Douglas Wilderness

The William O. Douglas Wilderness is a designated wilderness in Central Washington. It includes 169,081 acres (68,425 ha) located between the U.S. Route 12 and State Route 410 and is jointly administered by the Okanogan-Wenatchee National Forest and the Gifford Pinchot National Forest. It shares a boundary with the Mount Rainier National Park on the west; Norse Peak Wilderness lies to the north, Goat Rocks Wilderness to the south. Approximately 25 miles (40 km) of the Pacific Crest Trail travel along the Cascade Range crest within its boundaries. It contains scattered peaks, sharp ridges, steep slopes and hundreds of small lakes and potholes. Much of the wilderness is drained by tributaries of the Naches River.

== History ==
The 1984 Washington Wilderness Act designated the Cougar Lake roadless area as the William O. Douglas Wilderness, named after Supreme Court Justice William O. Douglas. Douglas was raised in Yakima, Washington and went on to be appointed to the U.S. Supreme Court by President Franklin D. Roosevelt. Justice Douglas is remembered for a long and distinguished career marked by his concern for civil rights and environmental issues. This tribute honors not only the active role Justice Douglas played in Federal wilderness legislation but also his lifelong dedication and love for the Cougar Lakes region. William O. Douglas knew the area trails intimately, and spent many summers at his cabin in Goose Prairie, Washington, a small mountain community surrounded by the present wilderness.

== Topography ==
While significant portions of the William O. Douglas Wilderness are high elevation forest, the overall topography is varied. The tallest and most visually striking peak is Mount Aix at 7,766 feet (2,367 m) with a prominence of 3,286 feet (1,002 m). The Cougar Lakes portion is characterized by high alpine lakes, and the Tumac Plateau is dotted with numerous lakes in a forest setting. The eastern edges of this wilderness drop to mid-elevation pine forest and bare ridges. The Meeks Table Natural Research Area, located on a basalt table mountain, is within the wilderness at its eastern boundary.

== See also ==
- List of U.S. Wilderness Areas
