= Bumping Lake =

Lake and reservoir in Washington state, USA

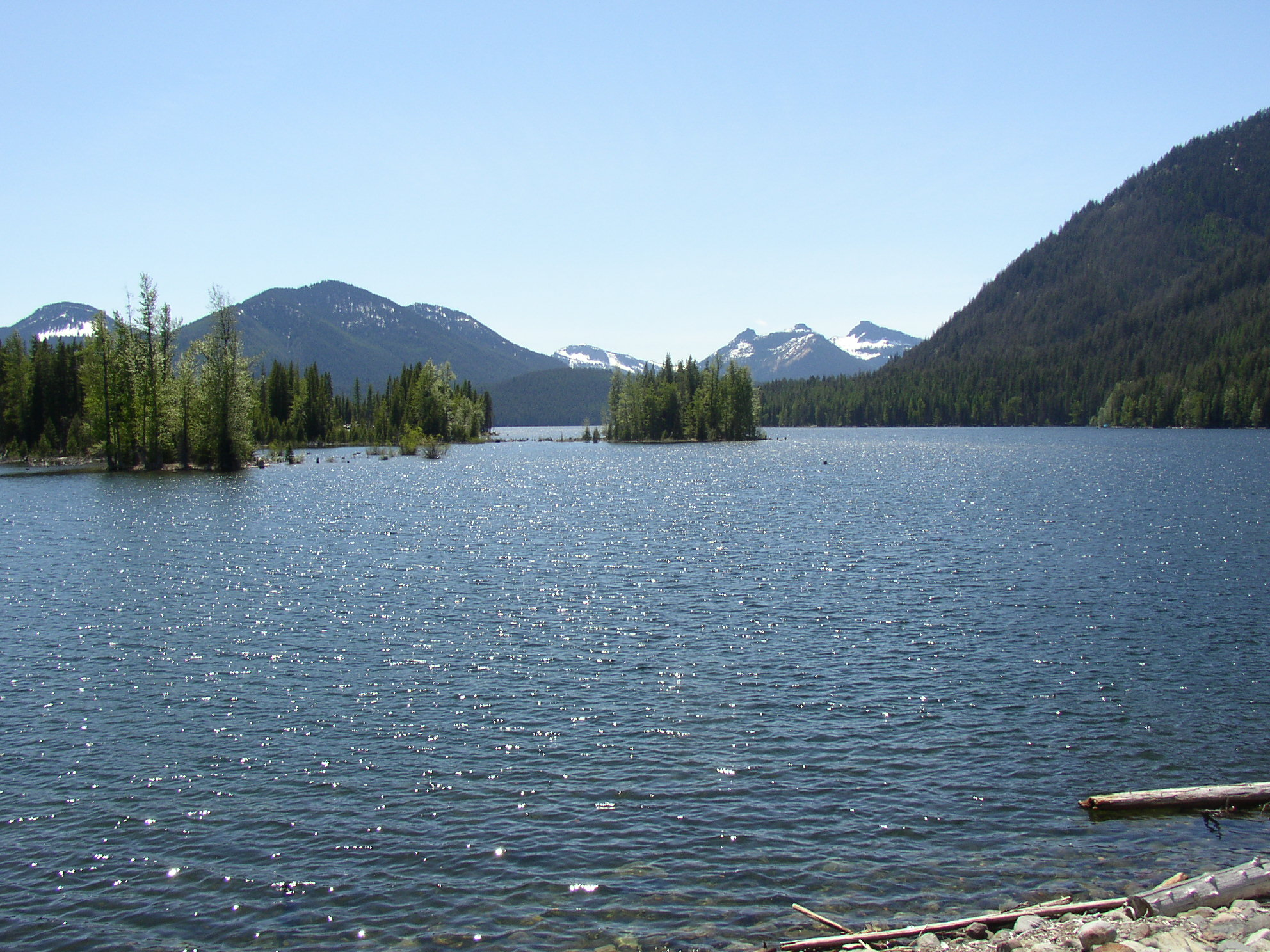

- Location within Washington (state)
- Location: Yakima County, Washington
- Coordinates: 46.8513°N 121.3193°W
- Type: reservoir, natural
- Primary inflows: Bumping River
- Primary outflows: Bumping River
- Catchment area: 68 sq mi (180 km^{2})
- Basin countries: United States
- Max. length: 3 mi (4.8 km)
- Max. width: 0.5 mi (0.80 km)
- Water volume: 0.01 cu mi (0.042 km^{3})
- Surface elevation: 3,426 ft (1,044 m)

Bumping Lake is a lake and reservoir along the course of the Bumping River, in Yakima County, Washington state, USA. Bumping Lake was also named as "Lake Plehnam" by Preston's Map of Oregon and Washington in the 1850s, and "Tannum Lake" by the United States General Land Office Map of Washington of 1897.

The lake is used as a storage reservoir for the Yakima Project, an irrigation project run by the United States Bureau of Reclamation. Although a natural lake, Bumping Lake's capacity and discharge is controlled by Bumping Lake Dam, a 60-foot (18 m) high earthfill structure built in 1910 and modified in the 1990s. As a storage reservoir, Bumping Lake's active capacity is 33,700 acre⋅ft (41.6 million m^{3}).
