= Washington State Route 168 =

State highway in Washington

State Route 168

Route information
- Auxiliary route of SR 410
- History: Proposed since 1930s Codified since 1970

Major junctions
- North end: SR 410 in Greenwater
- South end: SR 410 near Cliffdell

Location
- Country: United States
- State: Washington

Highway system
- State highways in Washington; Interstate; US; State; Scenic; Pre-1964; 1964 renumbering; Former
← SR 167	→ SR 169

State Route 168 (SR 168) is a legislated, but not constructed, state highway located in Washington, United States. The highway is meant to serve as an alternate crossing through the Cascade Range at Naches Pass, supplementing the seasonal Chinook Pass on SR 410. Proposals were first drawn in the 1930s, and the highway has been codified in law under its current designation since 1970, but no construction has occurred.

== Route description ==
The highway is legislated to begin at a junction with SR 410 in Greenwater, in eastern Pierce County. The road would travel east along the historic Naches Trail, passing through Mount Baker-Snoqualmie National Forest and across Naches Pass to Wenatchee National Forest. It would terminate at another junction with SR 410 north of Cliffdell in Yakima County. The highway would pass near Pyramid Peak, which has a maximum altitude of 5,718 ft (1,743 m). A crossing similar to the legislated highway is covered by a series of Forest Routes, including Road 19 and Road 70.

SR 168 would be an all-season route through Naches Pass, at an elevation of 4,923 feet (1,501 m), providing an alternative to SR 410, which closes annually due to avalanche dangers near Chinook Pass, at an elevation of 5,430 feet (1,655 m). SR 168 would allow commercial vehicles to bypass Mount Rainier National Park, where trucks and other large vehicles are prohibited on SR 410. The current restriction detours commercial traffic south to U.S. Route 12 over White Pass or north to Interstate 90 over Snoqualmie Pass.

== History ==
Plans for a Naches Tunnel or highway date back to the early 1930s, designated as the Naches Pass Link of Primary State Highway 5. The state legislature appropriated $50,000 (equivalent to $900,000 in 2025) for a study on the feasibility of a new highway. The 1946 study by engineer Ole Singstad determined that a Naches Pass tunnel would require a 24-mile (39 km) bore at 2,500 feet (760 m), which would be more difficult to build than a similar tunnel at either Snoqualmie or Stampede passes.

The corridor was included as part of an extension to Interstate 82 in a 1959 proposal by the Washington State Highway Commission that was later dropped. In the early 1960s, Governor Albert Rosellini established a committee to study the feasibility of a toll road. The route was considered feasible by the committee, and they estimated tolls of $1.50 per vehicle (equivalent to $12.00 in 2025) would need to be levied to pay for the highway. Proponents of the new highway were pushing to have U.S. Route 10 routed over the pass, away from the routing over Snoqualmie Pass, but this never occurred. Ultimately, the highway was not built as the state considered the highway unfeasible. The highway has been codified in Washington law since 1970, while the tunnel through Naches Pass has been codified in state law since 1959.
