= Ride Around Mount Rainier in One Day =

Cycling event in Washington, U.S.

Ride Around Mount Rainier in One Day (RAMROD) is an annual bicycle ride on a 154-mile (248 km) course around Mount Rainier National Park in the U.S. state of Washington. The course uses several highways and roads around the park and features approximately 10,000 feet (3,000 m) of elevation gain over two mountain passes. The ride is held on the last Thursday of July and has been organized by the Redmond Cycling Club since it began in 1984.

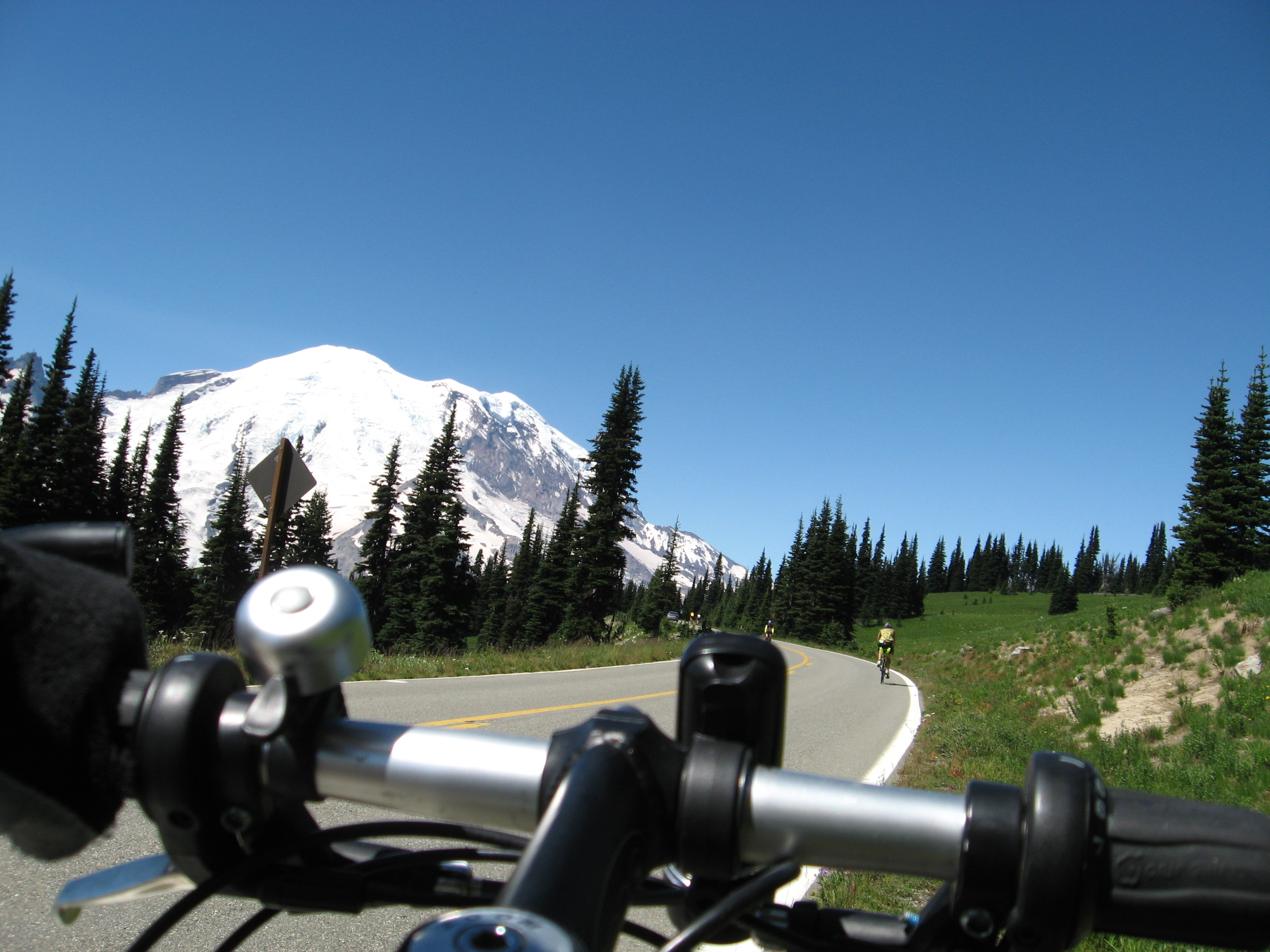
Approaching the Sunrise Point rest stop during the 2007 RAMROD

In 2007 the event was held with a modified route that did not circumnavigate Mount Rainier. The modified route was necessary due to the closure and severe damage to many roads in and near the park from the heavy rains during the Fall of 2006. In 2008 the Redmond Cycling Club moved back to the traditional route for the 25th anniversary of the event. The 2009 edition also featured a modified course due to a washout on Stevens Canyon Road. The 2020 and 2021 editions of the event were cancelled due to the COVID-19 pandemic and road construction around the park.

Registration for the event is through a lottery system. The National Park Service's special use permit limits the number of riders to 800. Volunteering for the event is one way to secure a place in the subsequent year's RAMROD; other tickets are also auctioned off by local charities.

As of 2023, the course begins and ends at Enumclaw High School in Enumclaw, where riders are able to use showers and toilets; the ride itself begins at 5 a.m. The route generally includes sections of State Route 706 from Elbe to the Nisqually Entrance; Paradise Road and Stevens Canyon Road within the park; State Route 123 to Cayuse Pass; and State Route 410 to return to Enumclaw. Mount Rainier National Park remains open during the race, with motorists cautioned to drive slower around cyclists.

The 2025 route was moved to avoid the Paradise corridor, with bicyclists crossing Cayuse Pass and traveling through the Skate Pass bypass route. The 2026 event was canceled after a disagreement with Mount Rainier National Park officials over the permitted route; a request to use the Stevens Canyon corridor was denied due to congestion concerns.
