= List of mountain passes in Washington =

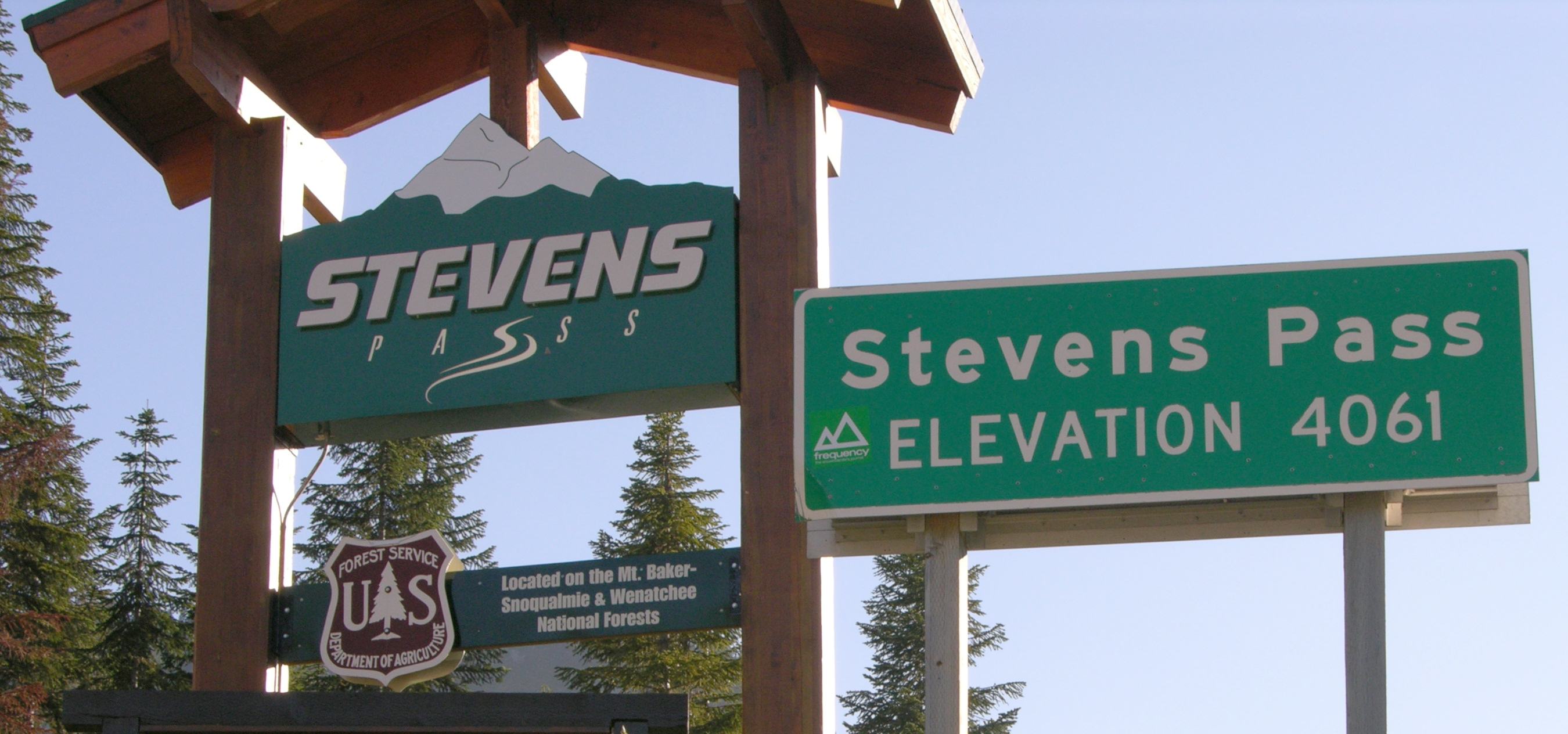
Stevens Pass, located in the Cascade Range

The U.S. state of Washington, located in the Pacific Northwest, has several major mountain ranges that are traversed by various passes. The state is divided by the Cascade Range, which has most of the highest passes, and is also home to the Blue Mountains, Kettle River Range, Olympic Mountains, Okanogan Highlands, and Selkirk Mountains.

Name	Mountain range	County	Elevation	Coordinates	Primary access route	Other access route(s)	GNIS
Aasgard Pass (Colchuck Pass)	Stuart Range	Chelan	7,831 feet (2,387 m)	47°28′49″N 120°49′14″W			1533528
Blewett Pass	Wenatchee Mountains	Chelan, Kittitas	4,124 feet (1,257 m)	47°20′07″N 120°34′44″W	US 97		1526843
Excelsior Pass	Cascade Range	Whatcom	5,384 feet (1,641 m)	48°54′34″N 121°48′06.5″W			
Cayuse Pass	Cascade Range	Pierce	4,833 feet (1,473 m)	46°52′01″N 121°32′19″W	SR 123; SR 410		1531580
Chinook Pass	Cascade Range	Pierce, Yakima	5,440 feet (1,660 m)	46°52′19″N 121°30′56″W	SR 410		1517726
Deception Pass	Cascade Range	King, Kittitas	4,475 feet (1,364 m)	47°35′39″N 121°8′26″W			1518568
Disautel Pass	Okanogan Highlands	Okanogan	2,487 feet (758 m)	48°21′38″N 119°14′14″W	SR 155		1518796
Loup Loup Pass	Cascade Range	Okanogan	4,022 feet (1,226 m)	48°23′19″N 119°53′14″W	SR 20		1522522
Naches Pass	Cascade Range	Pierce, King, Kittitas, Yakima	4,928 feet (1,502 m)	47°05′13″N 121°22′46″W			1523550
Satus Pass	Cascade Range	Klickitat	3,130 feet (950 m)	45°59′05″N 120°39′13″W	US 97		1508128
Sherman Pass	Kettle River Range	Ferry	5,541 feet (1,689 m)	48°36′27″N 118°28′46″W	SR 20		1525674
Snoqualmie Pass	Cascade Range	King, Kittitas	3,015 feet (919 m)	47°25′19″N 121°24′40″W	I-90		1526020
Stampede Pass	Cascade Range	King, Kittitas	3,688 feet (1,124 m)	47°17′00″N 121°21′04″W	BNSF Railway (disused)		1526486
Stevens Pass	Cascade Range	Chelan, King	4,061 feet (1,238 m)	47°44′42″N 121°05′36″W	US 2		1526553
Vanderbilt Gap	Manastash Ridge	Kittitas	2,672 feet (814 m)	46°52′50″N 120°25′35″W	I-82		1509212
Washington Pass	Cascade Range	Chelan, Okanogan	5,453 feet (1,662 m)	48°31′26″N 120°39′15″W	SR 20		1527830
Wauconda Pass	Okanogan Highlands	Okanogan	4,649 feet (1,417 m)	48°43′34″N 118°57′13″W	SR 20		1527857
White Pass	Cascade Range	Lewis, Yakima	4,478 feet (1,365 m)	46°38′19″N 121°23′22″W	US 12		1528074

== See also ==
- List of mountain ranges in Washington (state)
