= Naches Trail =

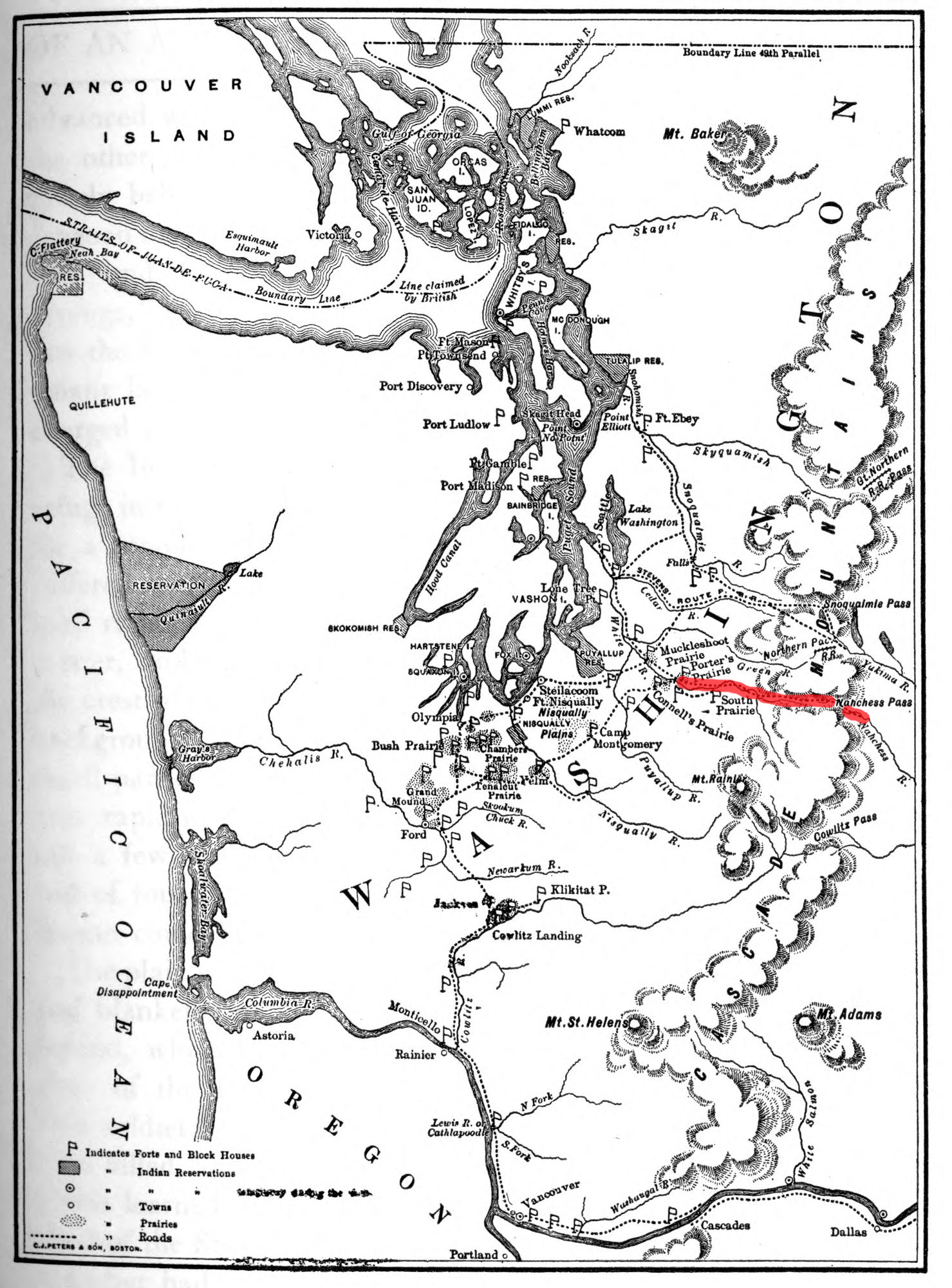
Naches Trail in Washington Territory circa 1855

Naches Trail (also spelled Nachess) is a historic trail in the U.S. state of Washington. It extends from the Naches River in Eastern Washington in the area inhabited by across Naches Pass in the Cascade Mountains to the Greenwater River in present-day Pierce County in Western Washington. Originally a trail used by the Indigenous Yakama people and Interior Salish people, it became one of the main routes of immigration by settlers to the Puget Sound region in the 19th century, especially before the improvement of the lower Snoqualmie Pass, which became the route of U.S. Route 10 then Interstate 90. The first written documentation of a traversal of the pass was made by a member of the United States Navy Wilkes Expedition, Lieutenant Robert E. Johnson in 1841. Due to dense forest on the west side of the pass, construction of a road was initially considered infeasible in 1853. The Longmire Party crossed the pass with their wagons, having to let them down the Naches Trail Cliffs (47.10419°N 121.46894°W) with ropes.

The road was never paved. As of 2017, it contains United States Forest Service forest roads popular for off-roading. The road has been proposed as a new state highway, designated as Washington State Route 168, since the 1930s.
