= Washington State Route 12 =

Washington State Route 12 may refer to several highways in the U.S. state of Washington:

- U.S. Route 12 in Washington
- State Road 12 (Washington 1923-1937), the Ocean Beach Highway
- Primary State Highway 12 (Washington) (1937-1970), the Ocean Beach Highway
- State Road 12 (Washington 1905-1919), the Methow-Barron Road
- Washington State Route 12 (1964-1967), now SR 14
