= State Road 1 (Washington) =

Two highways in the U.S. state of Washington have been named State Road 1:

- State Road 1 (Washington 1905-1913), the White River-Natches Road
- State Road 1 (Washington 1923-1937), the Pacific Highway; became Primary State Highway 1 until 1970
- It has also been stated that the Cascade Wagon Road had this number, but it was SR 13 from 1907 to 1915, PSH 17 from 1937 to 1961, and unnumbered at other times.
