= Washington State Route 410 =

State highway in Washington, US

State Route 410

- A map of the Cascade Range northeast of Mount Rainier and surrounding foothills with SR 410 highlighted in red.

Route information
- Maintained by WSDOT
- Length: 107.44 mi (172.91 km)
- Existed: 1967–present
- Tourist routes: Chinook Scenic Byway
- Restrictions: Segment through Chinook Pass closed during winter

Major junctions
- West end: SR 167 in Sumner
- SR 165 in Buckley; SR 164 in Enumclaw; SR 123 at Cayuse Pass
- East end: US 12 in Naches

Location
- Country: United States
- State: Washington
- Counties: Pierce, King, Yakima

Highway system
- State highways in Washington; Interstate; US; State; Scenic; Pre-1964; 1964 renumbering; Former
← SR 409	→ SR 411

State Route 410 (SR 410, partially named the Chinook Scenic Byway, and also named the Stephen Mather Memorial Parkway) is a 107.44-mile (172.91 km) long state highway that traverses Pierce, King, and Yakima counties in the US state of Washington. It begins at an interchange with SR 167 in Sumner and travels southeast across the Cascade Range to a junction with U.S. Route 12 (US 12) in Naches. While the western part of SR 410 is a freeway that serves built-up, urban areas, the remainder of the route is a surface road that traverses mostly rural areas as it passes through the mountains.

The route starts as a limited-access southerly bypass of Downtown Sumner, but becomes a surface road east of the city. Traveling eastward, the roadway serves Bonney Lake and Buckley, and crosses and eventually parallels the White River into Enumclaw and Greenwater. SR 410 enters the Mount Baker-Snoqualmie National Forest and later heads into Mount Rainier National Park, crossing the Cayuse and Chinook passes, and leaves the park southeast along the American River into Wenatchee National Forest. SR 410 leaves the national forest and travels parallel to the Naches River to end in Naches, a city located west of Yakima. The Chinook Scenic Byway begins in Enumclaw and follows the highway through the two national forests and Mount Rainier National Park to US 12 in Naches.

Modern SR 410 was parts of various state wagon roads until 1926 when US 410 was established, extending from Aberdeen to Lewiston, Idaho. US 410 was decommissioned after US 12 was extended over the majority of the highway in 1967, bypassing Olympia and Chinook Pass. A segment of former US 410 from Elma to Olympia became SR 8 and the Tacoma to Naches segment became SR 410. The highway was later shortened to end in Sumner and was replaced by SR 167 from Tacoma to Sumner.

== Route description ==
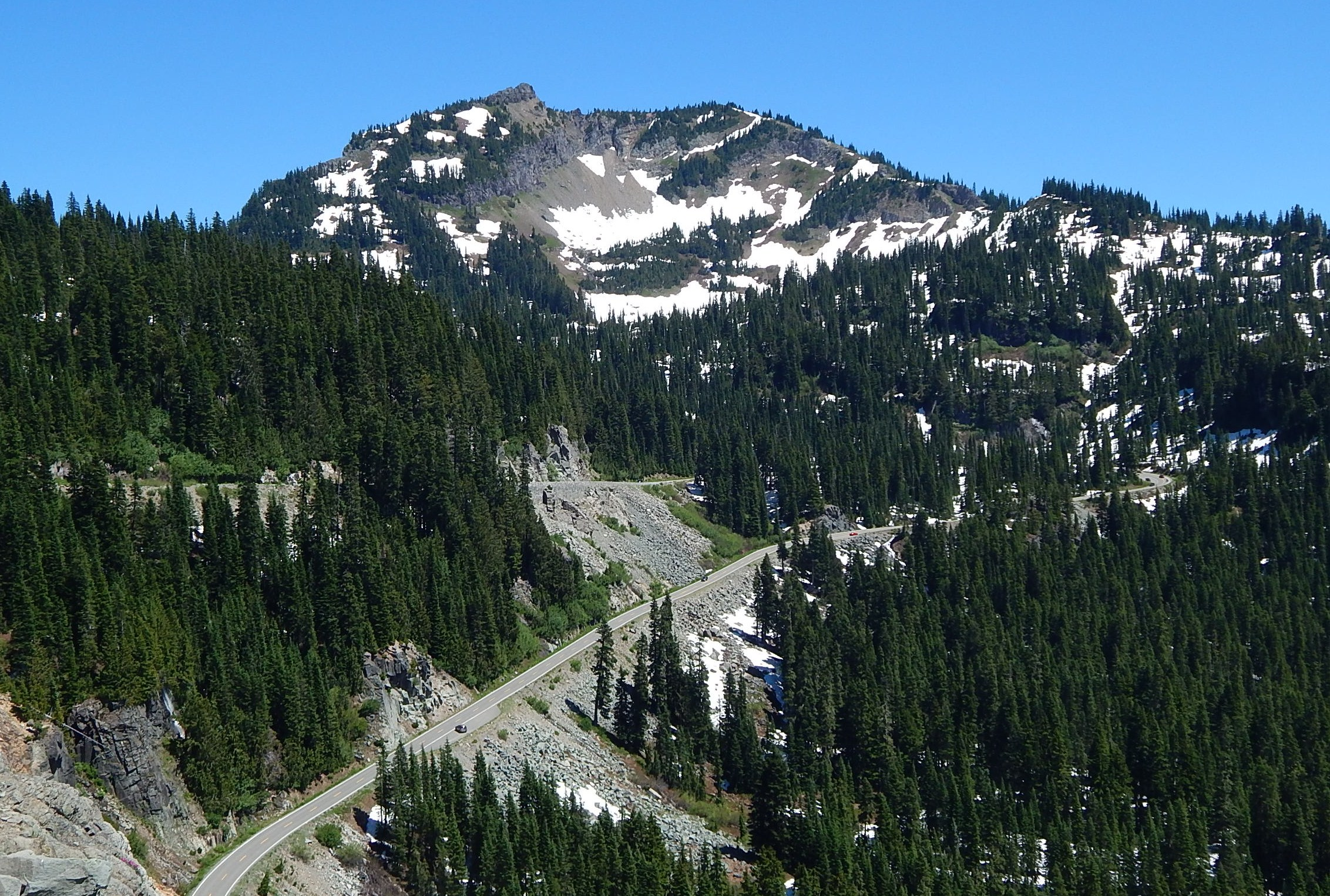
A series of switchbacks on SR 410 approaching Naches Peak

SR 410 begins as a freeway at an interchange with SR 167 near Downtown Sumner. The highway travels southeast across suburban areas, crossing the Stuck River and passing a partial cloverleaf interchange with Linden Drive, also named Traffic Avenue. After a second partial cloverleaf interchange with Thompson Avenue, SR 410 goes under a railroad trestle owned by BNSF Railway and used by Amtrak's Cascades rail service, near the northern bank of the Puyallup River. After turning northeast, SR 410 encounters the western terminus of SR 162 by way of a diamond interchange. SR 162 travels north into Downtown Sumner as Valley Avenue and south over the Puyallup River towards Orting. The freeway section near the interchange was the busiest recorded part of SR 410 in 2008 with a daily average of 59,000 motorists using the freeway. Continuing northeast, SR 410 connects to 166th Avenue and turns southeast as an undivided highway into the community of Bonney Lake. East of Bonney Lake, the roadway heads east, passing two shopping centers before entering Buckley and intersecting SR 165. In Buckley, the street travels northeast through Downtown and turns north to cross the White River and enter King County.

After leaving Pierce County, the highway travels northeast through rural areas into Enumclaw and passes Enumclaw High School before turning east and being renamed Roosevelt Avenue. As Roosevelt Avenue, the street intersects Griffin Avenue, also designated SR 164, which travels northwest to SR 169 and Auburn. The roadway, now named the Chinook Scenic Byway, passes by the King County Fairgrounds and Enumclaw King County Park. Leaving Enumclaw in a southeastern direction, SR 410 begins to parallel the White River upriver into Federation Forest State Park, a 619-acre (2.51 km^{2}; 0.967 sq mi) state park consisting of old growth evergreen forests. The highway crosses the Greenwater River, northeast of its confluence with the White River, and re-enters Pierce County.

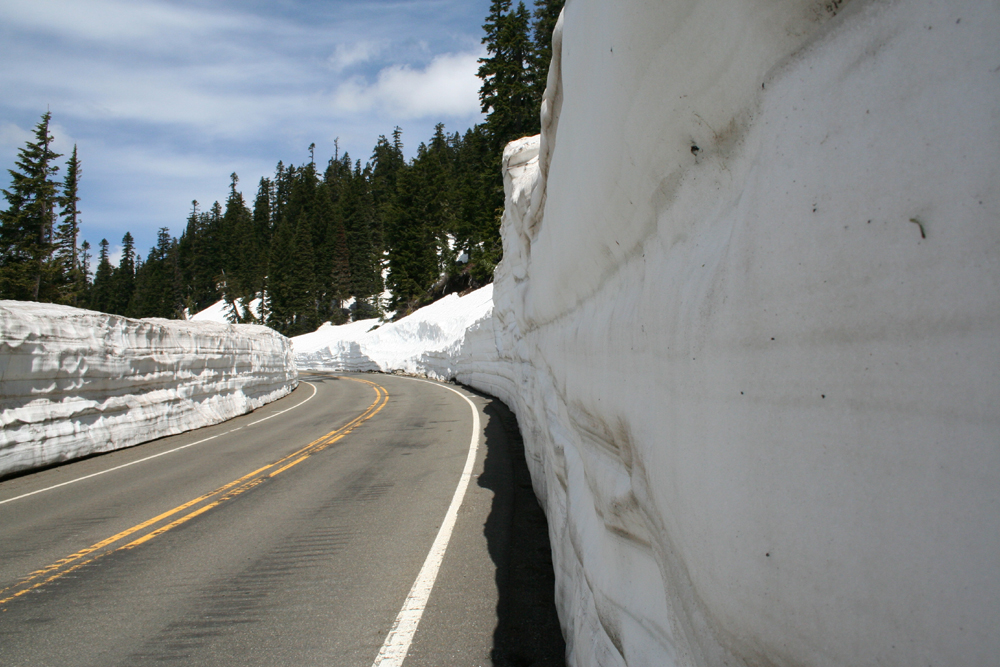
SR 410 traveling near Chinook Pass, the Pierce–Yakima county line, seen in June.

The bridge ends in the community of Greenwater, named for the river, where the roadway encounters Forest Road 70, which has been proposed to become SR 168 over Naches Pass as an alternative to the Chinook Scenic Byway. From Greenwater, the road travels south alongside the White River into Mount Baker-Snoqualmie National Forest, passing Ranger Creek State Airport, a state-owned airport that is open in the summer and early fall. The byway travels south into Mount Rainier National Park. SR 410 is closed at the gate to Morse Creek, about 5 miles east of the Chinook Pass Summit during the winter and early spring due to high wind, limited cell service and avalanche danger. It intersects SR 123 at Cayuse Pass. SR 410 turns east at the intersection and heads through a series of hairpin turns, passing Tipsoo Lake, to Chinook Pass.

Chinook Pass is the border between Pierce and Yakima counties and Mount Rainier National Park and the Wenatchee National Forest. The pass is also where the highway crosses the Pacific Crest Trail, a National Scenic Trail that was completed in 1993. East of Chinook Pass, the roadway begins to parallel the American River northeast to follow the Little Naches River, which becomes the Naches River. After a junction with the other end of the proposed SR 168, named Little Naches Road, the highway exits the Wenatchee National Forest and enters Naches. The byway ends at US 12 in Naches near the Naches Selah Canal.

== History ==
Several state roads from 1897 to 1923 that were in the vicinity of Chinook Pass.

The first portion of SR 410 that was defined under law to be built by the state of Washington was a state wagon road that extended from a county road in King County to a county road near Naches. The road ran up alongside the White River until it reached the summit of the Cascades and continued traveling down parallel to the American River before ending at the county road connecting to Naches. This road was approved and built in 1897, making it one of the oldest state roads in Washington state. In 1905, the road became known as State Road 1 and was incorporated into the first state highway system. By 1907, the road was named the White River – Natches Road and was shortened to end at Cedar Springs. The rest of the road was transferred to State Road 5, called the Cowlitz–Natches Road, which ran from Napavine to Naches.

In 1913, the state highway system was adjusted again, and several new roads were added to the system, including parts of what would become US 410. The Olympic Highway traveled around the Olympic Peninsula and a section from Aberdeen to Olympia was later used as part of US 410. The Pacific Highway would later have a brief concurrency with US 410 from Olympia to Tacoma, and US 410 would later connect to the National Park Highway in Tacoma and follow it to Buckley, where State Road 5, now a secondary highway maintained by the counties, began. From the end of State Road 5 in Naches, the Inland Empire Highway is concurrent with the future US 410 to Dayton, where a branch of the highway travels to Clarkston. State Road 5 became the McClellan Pass Highway in 1919 and was aligned further south to Chinook Pass. The McClellan Pass Highway was renamed the Naches Pass Highway in 1921 to reflect the realignment in 1919. Despite the name, the road did not cross Naches Pass, as no highway ever has.

A map of PSH 5 and its branches. After US 12 was extended through Washington in 1967, SR 410 used the Sumner–Buckley branch as well as the main highway to Naches for its route.

In 1923, the state highway system was restructured completely, incorporating numbers instead of names. The Olympic Highway became State Road 9, the Pacific Highway became State Road 1, the National Park Highway absorbed the Naches Pass Highway and remained State Road 5, and the Inland Empire Highway became State Road 3, but its branch from Dayton to Clarkston remained a branch of the now non-existent Inland Empire Highway. A system of national highways that improved on the concept of auto trails was formed in late 1925. The final plan for the system—which became the U.S. routes—was approved on November 11, 1926. One of the routes included in the plan was US 410, which extended from US 101 in Aberdeen to US 95 in Lewiston, Idaho. Parts of US 410 were concurrent with other new highways, including US 99 from Olympia to Tacoma and US 97 in Yakima.

The highway across Chinook Pass was completed in 1931 and named the Mather Memorial Highway for conservationist Stephen Mather during a dedication ceremony on July 2, 1932. In 1937, the state highway system changed to a primary and secondary system. US 410 remained the same, but its concurrent state highways had their designations changed by the state. State Road 9 became Primary State Highway 9 (PSH 9), State Road 1 and US 99 became PSH 1, State Road 5 became PSH 5, State Road 3 became PSH 3, and the Inland Empire Highway branch from Dayton to Clarkston became a branch of PSH 3.

In 1964, Washington unveiled a new numbering system for highways. Concurrencies with state primary state highways would be repealed in 1970 and US 410 would be a non-concurrent highway. On June 20, 1967, US 12 was extended west from Lewiston, Idaho, over White Pass to Aberdeen, eliminating most of the original route of the highway. The remaining sections were split amongst other routes. The segment from Elma to Olympia became State Route 8 (SR 8). Interstate 5 (I-5) took the Olympia–Tacoma segment, and the Tacoma–Naches segment became SR 410. The last reassurance markers for US 410 were taken down by December 1967.

Originally, SR 410 passed through downtown Puyallup and Sumner, following several surface streets (including Main Avenue in Puyallup and Thompson Street, Alder Avenue and Main Street in Sumner) across the two cities. In the late 1960s, construction began on a limited-access bypass of the two city centers. SR 410 was moved onto the new freeway by 1972. In 1973, SR 410 was shortened to its current length after SR 167 was extended to Tacoma. The Mather Memorial Parkway was designated as an All-American Road under the National Scenic Byways program in 1998.

On October 11, 2009, a massive landslide buried about 0.5 miles (0.80 km) of SR 410 west of Naches in the Nile Valley. The landslide also redirected a section of the Naches River and caused it to overflow into nearby homes. A detour was set up on Nile Road and initially limited to use by local residents until opening up to all traffic on October 20. SR 410 was permanently rerouted onto Nile Road sometime afterward, and the Washington State Department of Transportation (WSDOT) completed paving on the new segment of SR 410 on November 20. After three years, SR 410 was re-routed back to the east side of the Naches River along the toe of the landslide with a permanent route that opened in August 2012.

== Major intersections ==
County	Location	mi	km	Destinations	Notes
Pierce	Sumner	0.00	0.00	SR 167 (Valley Freeway) – Tacoma, Auburn, Renton	
Pierce	Sumner	0.48	0.77	Linden Drive (Traffic Avenue) / Thompson Avenue	
Pierce	Sumner	1.56	2.51	SR 162 east (Valley Avenue) – Orting	Western terminus of SR 162
Pierce	Sumner	2.63	4.23	166th Avenue East / Sumner Tapps Highway East	
Pierce	Sumner			East end of freeway	
Pierce	Buckley	11.84	19.05	SR 165 south – Wilkeson	Northern terminus of SR 165
White River				Bridge over White River	
King	Enumclaw	15.98	25.72	SR 164 west (Griffin Avenue) to SR 169 north (Porter Street) – Auburn, Renton	Begin Chinook Scenic Byway
Greenwater River		33.87	54.51	Bridge over Greenwater River	
Pierce	Greenwater	35.96	57.87	FR 70 east – Naches Pass	Proposed SR 168 east
Pierce		48.70	78.38	Mount Rainier National Park gate (entrance)	
Pierce	Cayuse Pass	56.86	91.51	SR 123 south to US 12 – Packwood	Northern terminus of SR 123
Chinook Pass		60.32	97.08	Chinook Pass	
Yakima	Wenatchee National Forest	65.64	105.64	Mount Rainier National Park gate (entrance)	
Yakima	Wenatchee National Forest	83.20	133.90	Little Naches Road – Naches Pass	Proposed SR 168 west
Yakima	Naches	107.44	172.91	US 12 – Yakima, White Pass	
1.000 mi = 1.609 km; 1.000 km = 0.621 mi
