= Washington State Route 123 =

State highway in Washington County, Washington, US

State Route 123

- SR 123 highlighted in red

Route information
- Auxiliary route of US 12
- Maintained by WSDOT
- Length: 16.34 mi (26.30 km)
- Existed: 1967–present
- Restrictions: Segment through Cayuse Pass closed during winter

Major junctions
- South end: US 12 in Gifford Pinchot NF
- North end: SR 410 in Mt. Rainier NP

Location
- Country: United States
- State: Washington

Highway system
- State highways in Washington; Interstate; US; State; Scenic; Pre-1964; 1964 renumbering; Former
← SR 122	→ SR 124

State Route 123 (SR 123) is a state highway in the Gifford Pinchot National Forest and Mount Rainier National Park east of Mount Rainier in the U.S. state of Washington. Located in the counties of Lewis and Pierce, the 16.34-mile (26.30 km) long roadway extends through a heavily forested canyon from U.S. Route 12 (US 12) to SR 410. First established as a branch of State Road 5 in 1923, the designation of SR 123 has changed from a branch of Primary State Highway 5 (PSH 5) in 1937 to SR 143 during the 1964 highway renumbering and SR 123 in 1967. The northern terminus of the highway, Cayuse Pass, is closed annually and in late 2006, the Hanukkah Eve windstorm of 2006 washed out a 10.90-mile (17.54 km) long segment of the roadway.

== Route description ==
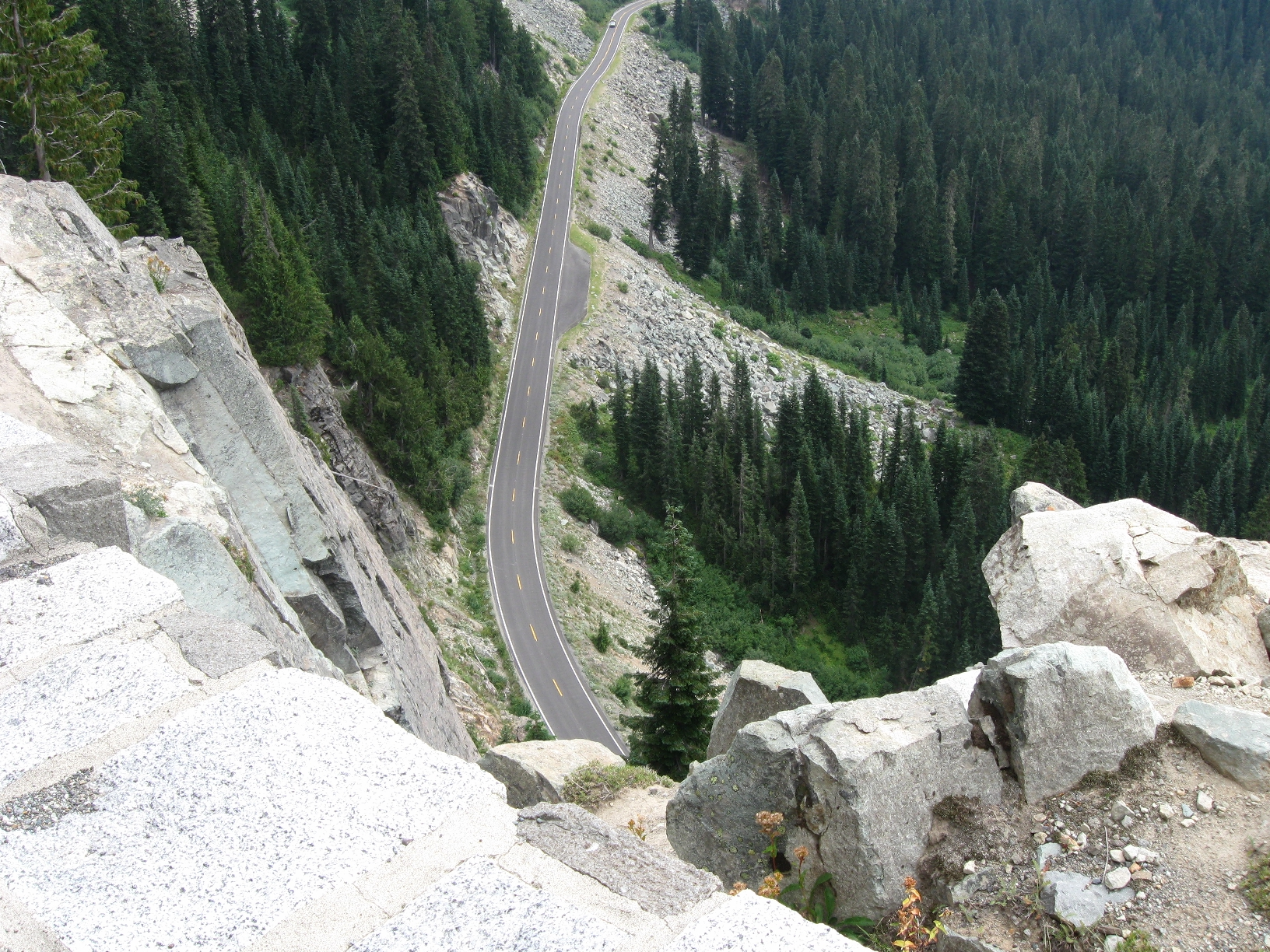
SR 123 southbound viewed from SR 410 west of Chinook Pass

State Route 123 (SR 123) begins at an intersection with U.S. Route 12 (US 12) northeast of Packwood, in the Gifford Pinchot National Forest. Paralleling US 12 and the Ohanapecosh River, the highway crosses Carlton Creek and enters a canyon where the roadway encounters Forest Route 44 (FR 44). The segment of SR 123 in the heavily forested canyon is the busiest along the road, with a daily average of 803 motorists in 2007. Still in the canyon, the roadway exits the Gifford Pinchot National Forest and enters the Mount Rainier National Park. The roadway passes the Ohanapecosh Visitor Center, located 1,900 feet (579.12 m) above sea level, crosses Laughingwater Creek and passes Silver Falls and the Stevens Canyon entrance, with access to the trailhead for the Grove of the Patriarchs, and eventually SR706 at Paradise. Continuing adjacent to the Ohanapecosh River, the road enters Pierce County from Lewis County, crosses over Panther Creek and begins ascending out of the valley bottom. Eventually following Chinook Creek, the highway travels into a tunnel under Seymour Peak and ends at an intersection with SR 410 at Cayuse Pass.

SR 123 is part of the route for the Ride Around Mount Rainier in One Day, annual bicycle race held in July that circumnavigates Mount Rainier National Park.

== History ==
A map showing highways located east of Mount Rainier and the year of their establishments. SR 123 is in the center and was established in 1923 as a branch of State Road 5.

The history of SR 123 begins with the establishment of the Pacific Forest Reserve in 1893, which became the Mount Rainier Forest Reserve on in 1897, both included the area near the present highway. The Mount Rainier National Park was established as the fifth national park on March 2, 1907. The Mount Rainier National Forest Reserve became the Rainier National Forest in 1907 and Columbia National Forest in 1908. In 1923, a renumbering and restructuring of the state highway system occurred and a branch of State Road 5, later named the Cayuse Pass–Yakima branch, was added to the system. The northern terminus of the roadway at Cayuse Pass became U.S. Route 410 (US 410) during the creation of the United States Numbered Highways. The Columbia National Forest replaced the Rainier National Forest in 1933. The branch of State Road 5 became the Cayuse Pass branch of Primary State Highway 5 (PSH 5) in 1937. Between 1946 and 1959, a ski resort operated at Cayuse Pass. In 1949, the Columbia National Forest was renamed to the Gifford Pinchot National Forest to honor a pioneer of the same name. During the 1964 highway renumbering, the Cayuse Pass branch of PSH 5 became SR 143, an auxiliary route of SR 14. SR 14 became US 12 on June 20, 1967, and SR 143 became SR 123, while US 410 became SR 410. Since 1974, the Washington State Department of Transportation (WSDOT) has recorded the opening and closing dates of Cayuse Pass. The only season when the pass was not closed was between 1976 and 1977. The earliest closure was on October 7, 1996, and the earliest opening was on March 30, 1992. The latest closure was on January 4, 1990, and the latest opening was June 21, 1996. After the Hanukkah Eve windstorm of 2006, a 10.90-mile (17.54 km) long segment of SR 123, which is only 16.34 miles (26.30 km) long, was washed out and need reconstruction. Construction started on June 21, 2007, and the road reopened on September 28, 2007.

== Major intersections ==
County	Location	mi	km	Destinations	Notes
Lewis	Gifford Pinchot NF	0.00	0.00	US 12 (White Pass Highway) – Aberdeen, Chehalis, Yakima	
Lewis	Gifford Pinchot NF	5.40	8.69	FR 44 west (Stevens Canyon Road) to SR 706 west (Road to Paradise) – Longmire, Paradise, Elbe	
Lewis	Mount Rainier National Park boundary				
Pierce	Mt. Rainier NP	16.34	26.30	SR 410 (Chinook Pass Scenic Byway) – Tacoma, Naches, Yakima	
1.000 mi = 1.609 km; 1.000 km = 0.621 mi
