= Poodle Dog Pass =

- Location within the United States Location within Washington (state)
- Elevation: 1,329 metres (4,360 ft)
- Traversed by: Silver Lake Trail #708

Third Approach
- Location: Snohomish County, Washington, US
- Range: North Cascades
- Coordinates: 47°58′21.39″N 121°24′2.39″W

Poodle Dog Pass is a 1,329-meter (4,360 ft) pass in the Cascade Mountains of Snohomish County, Washington. It is just above Silver Lake in the Henry M. Jackson Wilderness; it was described in 1917 as "The pass at the head of Sunday Creek just before reaching Silver Lake from Monte Cristo" and was formerly part of a route between mining operations at Mineral City, Washington and Monte Cristo, Washington, which are now both ghost towns in Snohomish County.

According to one history, prospector Joseph Pearsall saw an enormous galena ore lode while surveying the countryside from Hubbart's Peak in 1889, took Poodle Dog to assess it, and his discovery led to the development of Monte Cristo. According to another history, the pass was named in honor of a dog belonging to Frank Peabody, an associate of Pearsall.

A primitive trail, Poodle Dog Pass-Silver Lake-Twin Lakes Trail (F.S. trail 708), leads to the pass and beyond. The U.S. Forest Service describes a steep, scree section up from the pass to a 5,400-foot viewpoint as "a system of braided, intermittent boot paths ... two miles that feel like five".

== See also ==
- List of mountain passes in Washington (state)
