= Elbe Evangelical Lutheran Church =

Historic church in Washington, United States

- U.S. National Register of Historic Places
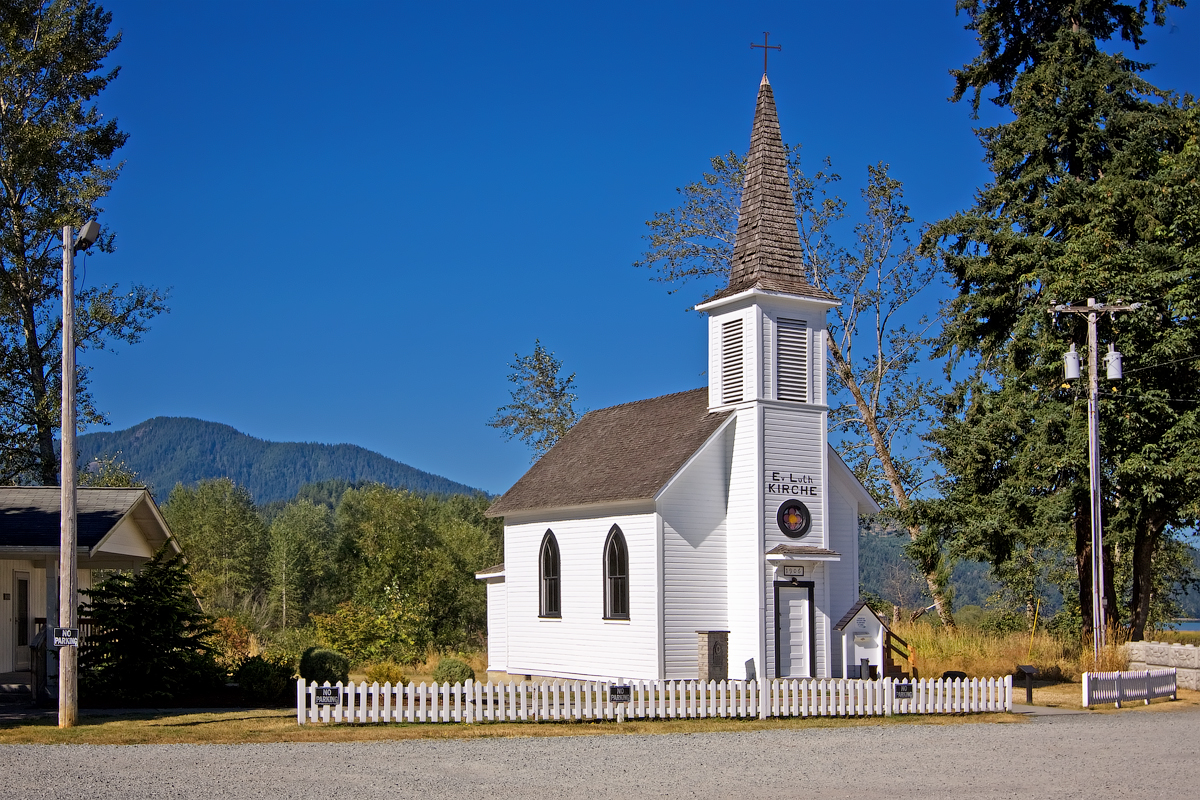
- The church pictured in 2011

- Location within Washington (state) Location within the United States
- Location: 54206 Mountain Hwy E Elbe, Washington, U.S.
- Coordinates: 46°45′52.49″N 122°11′39.44″W
- Built: 1906
- Architect: Karl Killian
- NRHP reference No.: 76001899
- Added to NRHP: October 8, 1976

The Elbe Evangelical Lutheran Church (also known as the Little White Church of Elbe) is a small church in Elbe, Pierce County, Washington, USA. The church has been listed by sources, including Ripley's Believe It or Not!, as the world's smallest functional church.

== History ==
1888: Carl “Charles” Elbe Lutkens (1869-1950) & Adams Sachs (1858-1921) homesteaded Elbe along the Nisqually River. They named the town after the Elbe River in Hamburg, Germany from where Lutkens had emigrated.

1891: Heinrich “Henry” C. Lutkens (1832-1919), his wife Christine Böttcher Lutkens (1848-1933) & their other children settled in Elbe.

1892: The Elbe Post Office was established.

1893: Pastor Dr. Lewis Herman Schuh (1858-1936; of Tacoma’s German Evangelical Trinity Church) traveled to Elbe to organize the Elbe Evangelical Lutheran Church congregation & to hold its first services in the Elbe Town Hall.

1895-1905: Pastor J. F. Oertel (of Puyallup) led worship services in homes in Elbe.

1903: Sachs platted the town of Elbe.

1904: The Tacoma Eastern Railroad reached Elbe. H. Lutkens donated the land for its depot.

1904-1905: H. Lutkens platted additions to the town of Elbe

1906: It was built 24’ long x 18’ wide. Its 44’ tall steeple (housing a railroad locomotive bell) is topped with a 4’ tall iron cross. H. Lutkens donated the land & lumber for its construction; and served as a deacon. Pastor Karl Kilian (1869-1945) designed, built & dedicated it; and then was its first pastor.

1926: The Mountain Highway (Highway 7) was paved from Tacoma to Mt. Rainier National Park’s Nisqually entrance.

1930: Services in German ended.

1933: Kilian retired after being its pastor for 27 years.

1944: Lake Alder was formed behind it when the Alder Dam was completed on the Nisqually River.

1973: Rev. Dr. Ervin E. Krebs (of Tacoma) reinstituted monthly worship services.

Oct 8, 1976: It was placed on the National Register of Historic Places.

July 1, 1984: Bishop Clifford Rolf Lunde (1930-1987) became it honorary pastor; it therefore became a cathedral (the seat of the bishop); and its “pfaarhaus” (fellowship house) was dedicated next door.

2015-2021: Pastor Margaret O’Neal served as its most recent pastor.

== Sources ==
- Filley, Bette (1996). The Big Fact Book About Mount Rainier, Dunamis House, ISBN 1-880405-06-7.
