= Muckleshoot Tribal Schools =

Tribal school in Washington, United States

Coordinates: 47.2640°N 122.1371°W

Muckleshoot Tribal Schools (MTS) is a K-12 school on the Muckleshoot reservation, in unincorporated King County, Washington, with an Auburn postal address. It is affiliated with the Bureau of Indian Education (BIE). The school is off of Washington State Route 164.

In 1985 the school opened in the tribal community center. At the time it had 45 students. In 2001 it had its first graduating high school class with two students, and its enrollment was 125, with 98% of them being members of the Muckleshoot tribe. In 2009 its current facility opened. Its expected capacity was 500-600. The current facility has 107,000 square feet (9,900 m^{2}) of building area.
