= Washington State Route 164 =

State highway in King County, Washington, US

State Route 164
- Auburn–Enumclaw Road
- SR 164 highlighted in red

Route information
- Auxiliary route of SR 410
- Maintained by WSDOT
- Length: 14.82 mi (23.85 km)
- Existed: 1964–present

Major junctions
- West end: SR 18 in Auburn
- SR 169 in Enumclaw
- East end: SR 410 in Enumclaw

Location
- Country: United States
- State: Washington
- County: King

Highway system
- State highways in Washington; Interstate; US; State; Scenic; Pre-1964; 1964 renumbering; Former
← SR 163	→ SR 165

State Route 164 (SR 164) is a 14.82-mile-long (23.85 km) state highway serving southern King County in the U.S. state of Washington. The highway, which connects Auburn and Enumclaw along the White River, begins at an interchange with SR 18 in Auburn and travels southeast to Enumclaw, where it intersects SR 169 and ends at SR 410. SR 164 serves as an alternate route towards Buckley and Chinook Pass, via SR 410, and also passes the Muckleshoot Indian Reservation.

SR 164 was originally part of various state wagon roads between 1913 and 1923, becoming part of State Road 5, later Primary State Highway 5 (PSH 5), and U.S. Route 410 (US 410) in 1926. US 410 was later realigned south in the 1940s and SR 167 was assigned to the former route during the 1964 highway renumbering. In 1969, SR 164 was established and the western terminus was later shortened to an interchange with SR 18 south of Auburn.

== Route description ==
SR 164 begins as Auburn Way at a partial cloverleaf interchange with the SR 18 freeway south of the Auburn Shopping Center in Downtown Auburn. The highway travels southeast and passes Les Gove Park and White River Valley Museum before leaving Auburn, following the White River upstream into the Muckleshoot Indian Reservation, passing the Muckleshoot Casino. Auburn Way travels east and southeast within the reservation, passing Seattle Air Route Traffic Control Center, the Auburn Adventist Academy and Muckleshoot Tribal School. SR 164 leaves the reservation and enters rural King County, continuing to follow the White River as the Auburn–Enumclaw Road and passing the White River Amphitheatre, turning east as it approaches Enumclaw. The highway, now named 436th Street, passes Mahler Park and dips south onto Griffin Avenue into Downtown Enumclaw. Griffin Avenue turns southeast and intersects Porter Street, the southern terminus of SR 169, before traveling to an intersection with Roosevelt Avenue, signed as SR 410, where SR 164 ends.

Every year, the Washington State Department of Transportation (WSDOT) conducts a series of surveys on its highways in the state to measure traffic volume. This is expressed in terms of annual average daily traffic (AADT), which is a measure of traffic volume for any average day of the year. In 2011, WSDOT calculated that between 9,200 and 34,000 vehicles per day used the highway, mostly in the Auburn area. WSDOT has designated SR 164 as a Highway of Statewide Significance, which includes principal arterials that are needed to connect major communities in the state.

== History ==
A map of PSH 5 and its branches, at the time of the 1964 highway renumbering.

SR 164 was first defined under law to be built and paved by the state of Washington in 1913 as the McClellan Pass Highway, extending southeast from Tacoma along the Puyallup and White rivers to Chinook Pass and towards Naches along an existing county road from Auburn and Enumclaw built in the 1890s. The highway was renamed to the Naches Pass Highway in 1921 and became State Road 5 during a 1923 restructuring of the state highway system. After the formation of the United States Numbered Highways in 1926, US 410 was created and used the route of State Road 5 between Tacoma and Naches. State Road 5 became PSH 5, extended north to Renton and named the National Park Highway, was established during the creation of the Primary and secondary state highways in 1937. US 410 was moved south to a new Sumner–Buckley highway in the 1950s and was replaced by an extension of US 12 in 1967. During the 1964 highway renumbering, PSH 5 was split into several highways, including SR 167 between Renton and Enumclaw, ending at SR 410. In 1969, SR 167 was moved onto former SR 163 between Sumner and Auburn and SR 164 was established. SR 164 originally ended at SR 18 in Downtown Auburn, but was moved south when SR 18 was realigned onto a new freeway in 1987. No major revisions to the route of the highway have occurred since.

== Major intersections ==
The entire highway is in King County.

Location	mi	km	Destinations	Notes
Auburn	0.00– 0.07	0.00– 0.11	SR 18 to I-5 – Federal Way, Tacoma, North Bend	Western terminus; interchange
Enumclaw	14.21	22.87	SR 169 north (Porter Street) – Renton	
Enumclaw	14.82	23.85	SR 410 (Roosevelt Avenue) – Tacoma, Mt. Rainier, Crystal Mt., Yakima	Eastern terminus
1.000 mi = 1.609 km; 1.000 km = 0.621 mi
