= Washington State Route 706 =

State highway in Pierce County, Washington

State Route 706
- Road to Paradise
- SR 706 highlighted in red.

Route information
- Auxiliary route of SR 7
- Maintained by WSDOT
- Length: 13.64 mi (21.95 km)
- Existed: 1964–present

Major junctions
- West end: SR 7 in Elbe
- East end: Mount Rainier National Park

Location
- Country: United States
- State: Washington

Highway system
- State highways in Washington; Interstate; US; State; Scenic; Pre-1964; 1964 renumbering; Former
← I-705	→ US 730

State Route 706 (SR 706, also known as the Road to Paradise) is a state highway in Pierce County, in the U.S. state of Washington. It extends 13.64 miles (21.95 km) from SR 7 in the census-designated place (CDP) of Elbe east to the Longmire gate of Mount Rainier National Park.

The highway was part of the Tacoma – Mount Rainier branch of Primary State Highway 5 (PSH 5 TR) from 1937 until 1964 and ran from Tacoma south to Elbe and east to Longmire. In 1964, PSH 5 TR from Tacoma to Elbe became part of SR 7 and the Elbe to Mount Rainier section became SR 706.

== Route description ==
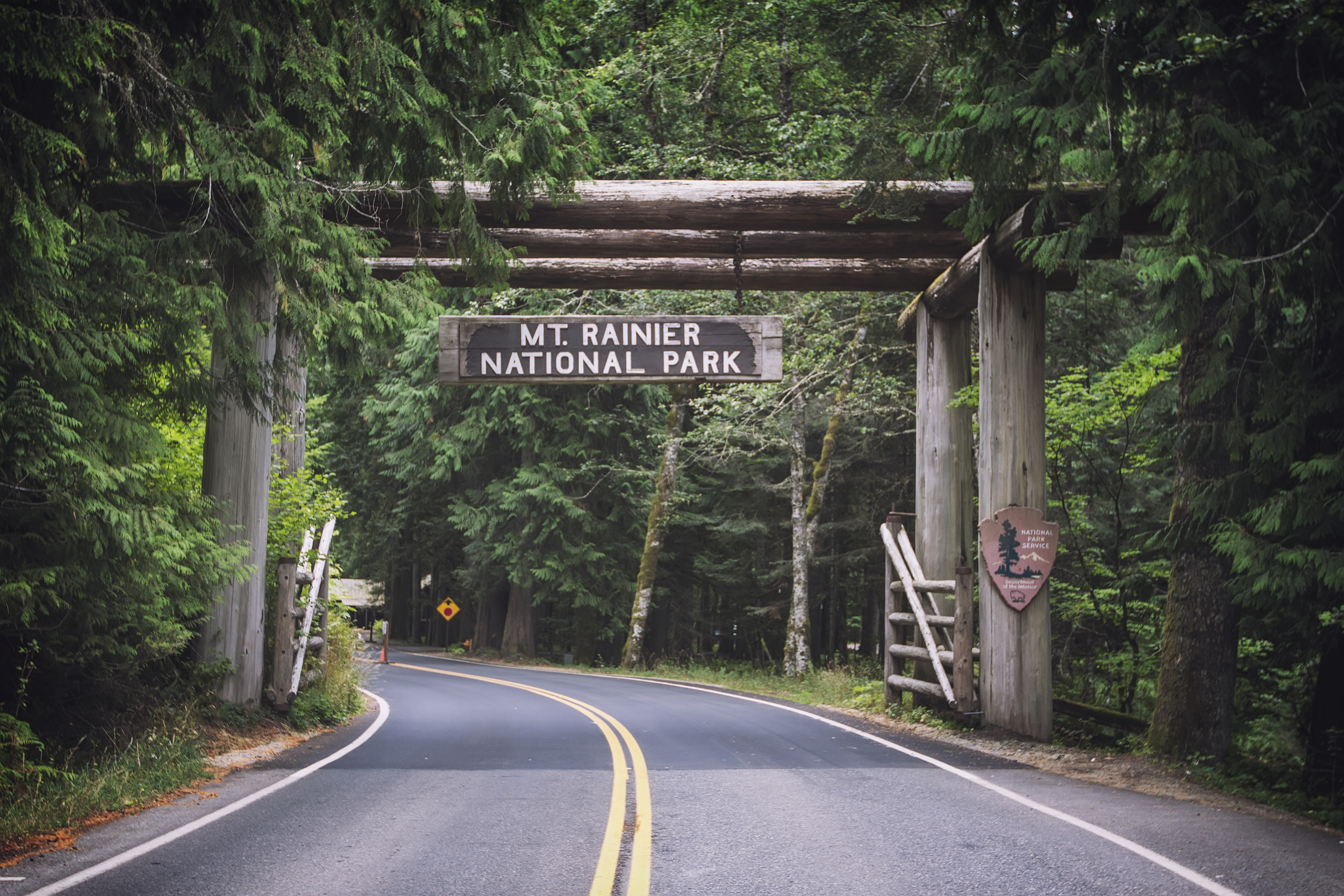
The Nisqually entrance gate to Mount Rainier National Park at the eastern terminus of SR 706

SR 706 runs 13.64 miles (21.95 km) from an intersection with SR 7 in the census-designated place (CDP) of Elbe, east to end at the Longmire gate of Mount Rainier National Park (Mount Rainier NP). The route serves as a connector from Elbe to Mount Rainier NP. The highway is open all-year and the entrance to Mount Rainier National Park is open all-year round, unlike other entrances that are open only in the summer. WSDOT has found that more than 3,100 motorists utilize the road daily after the interchange with I-5 based on annual average daily traffic (AADT) data.

SR 706 starts at an intersection with SR 7 in Elbe. After the junction, the road goes northeast, paralleling a railroad owned by Tacoma Rail. The railroad extends south to Morton and north to Tacoma. The highway then turns southeast to Park Junction. After passing Park Junction, SR 706 turns due east to National, where the railroad ends. From National, the road turns northeast and curves southeast into Ashford. In Ashford, the highway returns going due east before starting to curve and then end at the entrance to Mount Rainier National Park. The road continues east to the Henry M. Jackson Visitor Center.

SR 706 is part of the route for the Ride Around Mount Rainier in One Day, annual bicycle race held in July that circumnavigates Mount Rainier National Park.

== History ==
The shield of PSH 5 TR.

A wagon road was commissioned by James Longmire between Ashford and hot springs at modern-day Longmire in 1884; its construction a decade later used Coast Salish laborers who had been hired by "Indian Henry", a veteran of the Puget Sound War. By 1893, the road had been extended west through Ashford, but had not reached Elbe. In 1901, residents of towns near the new national park lobbied the Pierce County government to construct a modern road to Longmire and later Paradise Valley. Mount Rainier National Park was the first national park to allow automobile traffic, beginning in 1907; three years later, a road to Paradise Valley was completed.

The National Park Highway was established by the state government in 1913 to connect Tacoma to Mount Rainier National Park; it had a branch that followed the existing road through Ashford to the Longmire entrance of the park. When the Primary and Secondary Highways were created in 1937, the route of SR 706 became part of the Tacoma – Mount Rainier branch of Primary State Highway 5 (PSH 5 TR). PSH 5 TR ran from Primary State Highway 1 (PSH 1) in Tacoma south to Elbe and east to Longmire. PSH 5 TR became SR 706 in 1964 during the 1964 highway renumbering, in which the Washington State Department of Transportation (WSDOT) replaced the previous system of Primary and Secondary Highways with a new system called State Routes, which is still in use today. In 1990, the Washington State Legislature passed a bill that renamed the highway to the Road to Paradise, to aid tourists in finding Paradise Valley.

== Major intersections ==
The entire route is in Pierce County.

Location	mi	km	Destinations	Notes
Elbe	0.00	0.00	SR 7 – Tacoma, Spanaway, Morton	
Gifford Pinchot NF	10.14	16.32	Entering Gifford Pinchot NF	
Longmire	13.64	21.95	Mount Rainier National Park	
1.000 mi = 1.609 km; 1.000 km = 0.621 mi
