= Pyramid Peak (King County, Washington) =

Mountain in Washington (state), United States

Coordinates: 47°06′41″N 121°24′18″W

Pyramid Peak is a 5,646-foot (1,721 m) summit in the Cascade Mountains of Washington State, near Naches Pass on the King-Kittitas county line. The peak is near the Pacific Crest Trail and can be reached via a branch trail. It once had a series of fire lookouts beginning in 1923, the last of which was destroyed c. the early 1960s.

The height is 5,715 feet on some maps.
