= Secondary state highways as branches of Primary State Highway 7 (Washington) =

Map of the secondary branches of Primary State Highway 7. Click on the map for a closer look.

Between 1937 and 1964, the highway system in the state of Washington consisted of a series of primary state highways (PSH), most of which were associated with one or more secondary state highways (SSH). The following are the secondary state highways formerly associated with Primary State Highway 7.

== SSH 7B ==

Secondary State Highway 7B, commissioned in 1937, was a short (about 6 miles) route that extended due east from U.S. Route 97 (PSH 3 south of Ellensburg, took a 90-degree turn to the north at Kittitas, and terminated at PSH 7/U.S. Route 10 about a mile north of Kittitas. SSH 7B was removed from the state highway system in 1953. The route is not part of the modern Washington state route system.

== SSH 7C ==

When it was added to the state highway system in 1951, Secondary State Highway 7C originated at US 10/PSH-7 at the east end of the Vantage Bridge, at a point where the main highway turned north to climb out of the Columbia River Valley. From the banks of the Columbia, SSH 7C headed east to a junction with US 395/PSH 11 west of Othello, remaining roughly parallel to US 10 but taking a more southerly route. In 1961, SSH 7B was extended east to SSH 11B in Washtucna. Today, SSH 7C is part of SR 26.

Beginning in 1957, a branch of SSH 7C originated at the SSH 7C trunk route about a mile south of its western terminus at US 10, then followed the bank of the Columbia south and east to a junction with SSH 7A, just inside the Hanford Site. Today, SSH 7C is SR 243.

== SSH 7E ==

In 1955, a state law created a corridor for an unconstructed highway, designated Secondary State Route 7E, extending from US 10/PSH 18 in Moses Lake northeast to PSH 7 west of Odessa. The only part of this route that was ever constructed and signed as SSH 7E was a 3.8-mile (6.1 km) road through Moses Lake from US 10 (later Interstate 90)/PSH 18 in the southwest to SSR 11G in the northeast. Today, this route is SR 171. The leg from SSR 11G (today's SR 17) to the Odessa area has never been constructed and is not part of the modern state route system.
