= List of Primary State Highways in Washington =

- Marker for PSH 1

Highway names
- Primary: Primary State Highway X (PSH X)
- Secondary: Secondary State Highway X (SSH X)

System links
- State highways in Washington; Interstate; US; State; Scenic; Pre-1964; 1964 renumbering; Former

State highways in 1970: primary in red and secondary in purple

Primary State Highways were major state highways in the U.S. state of Washington used in the early 20th century. They were created as the first organized road numbering system in the state in stages between 1905 and 1937 and used until the 1964 state highway renumbering. These highways had named branch routes as well as secondary state highways with lettered suffixes. The system of primary and secondary state highways were replaced by sign routes (now state routes) to consolidate and create a more organized and systematic method of numbering the highways within the state.

== History ==
The first state road, running across the Cascade Range roughly where State Route 20 now crosses it, was designated by the legislature in 1893 (However, this road wasn't actually opened until 1972). Two other roads—a Cascade crossing at present State Route 410 and a branch of the first road to Wenatchee—were added in 1897. The Washington Highway Department was established in 1905, and a set of twelve State Roads, numbered from 1 to 12, were assigned. A thirteenth was added in 1907, and State Roads 14 to 18 in 1909.

However, it was not until 1913 that a connected system was laid out—earlier state roads had been disconnected segments of road needing improvements. The seven primary roads were only assigned names, while the older state roads kept their numbers as secondary roads. In 1923, most state roads were assigned new numbers, though the primary and secondary split remained, and several roads remained named only. The United States Numbered Highways were assigned in late 1926, overlapping some of the State Roads.

The first major reworking of the system was passed in 1937, including a complete renumbering. A number of Primary State Highways were designated, while Secondary State Highways were suffixed spurs off those. For instance, Primary State Highway 1 was the Pacific Highway (present Interstate 5), and Secondary State Highway 1B was a spur from Bellingham to the Canadian border (now State Route 539). U.S. Routes kept dual designations with State Highways. By 1952, the present highway shield, in the shape of George Washington's head, had been adopted.

The primary/secondary state highway systems were replaced by the current numbering system in the 1960s, at the behest of the state legislature following the 1962 World's Fair in Seattle. The signs for the new highway numbers, which would be organized based on their general direction and—for secondary routes—a leading digit, first were posted in late 1963 and took effect in January 1964. The new numbers also coincided with existing U.S. Routes and new Interstate Highways to reduce confusion and eliminate duplicate numbers. The PSH/SSH signs were removed by 1970.

== Secondary State Highways ==
Secondary State Highways (SSH) were branches of Primary State Highways with lettered suffixes used from 1937 to 1964.

- Branches of PSH 1
- Branches of PSH 2
- Branches of PSH 3
- Branches of PSH 4
- Branches of PSH 5
- Branches of PSH 6
- Branches of PSH 7
- Branches of PSH 8
- Branches of PSH 9
- Branches of PSH 10
- Branches of PSH 11
- Branches of PSH 12
- Branches of PSH 13
- Branches of PSH 14
- Branches of PSH 15
- Branches of PSH 16
- Branches of PSH 17
- Branches of PSH 21
- Branches of PSH 22

== Primary State Highway 1 ==
Primary State Highway 1
- Location: Vancouver to Canada–United States border
- Existed: 1937–1964

PSH 1 followed the route of U.S. Route 99 (replaced by Interstate 5) from Vancouver to Blaine. It also served U.S. Route 99 Alternate (now SR 11) in Skagit and Whatcom counties.

== Primary State Highway 2 ==
Primary State Highway 2
- Location: Seattle to Idaho State Line
- Existed: 1937–1964

PSH 2 originally followed the Sunset Highway, which was the first continuous east–west highway in Washington when it was designated in 1915. The Sunset Highway was numbered as State Road 2 in 1923 and later PSH 2 in 1937. Its route was adopted by U.S. Route 10 in 1926 (replaced by Interstate 90) from Seattle to near Ellensburg, then U.S. Route 97 to Peshastin, then U.S. Route 2 to Spokane, then US 10/I-90 from Spokane to the Idaho state line. A southern branch of PSH 2 followed the route of Washington State Route 18 from Snoqualmie to Tacoma.

The highway originally traveled through Fall City and Snoqualmie until the completion of a more direct alignment through the Issaquah Alps between Issaquah and North Bend. Prior to the construction of the first floating bridge across Lake Washington in 1940, the route from Seattle to Issaquah followed what would later become SR 900.

== Primary State Highway 3 ==
Primary State Highway 3
- Location: Cle Elum to Canada–United States border
- Existed: 1937–1964

This route followed Interstate 82 from Ellensburg to the Oregon State line (concurrent with U.S. Route 97 from Ellensburg to Union Gap and U.S. Route 410/12 from Union Gap to the Tri-Cities), U.S. Route 410 (now U.S. Route 12) from the Tri-Cities to Clarkston, U.S. Route 195 from Clarkston to Pullman, SR 27 from Pullman to Oaksedale, US 195 from Oakesdale to Spokane, U.S. Route 2 from Spokane to Mead and U.S. Route 395 from Mead to the U.S.-Canada border. Spurs extended along I-82/, SR 125 and SR 129 from Tri-Cities, Walla Walla and Clarkston to the Oregon State Line

This route was also known as the "Inland Empire Highway" and crossed the first, and for a time, the only highway bridge over the middle Columbia River. That bridge was located between the towns of Kennewick, WA and Pasco, WA.

== Primary State Highway 4 ==
Tonasket - Sanpoil Highway
- Location: Tonasket to Wilbur
- Existed: 1937–1964

Originally designated as the eastern section of the Marble Mount Road outlined by the state in 1899. The proposed section would have been from the Columbia River at the mouth of the Sanpoil River, "Sans Poil creek", north up the Sanpoil valley to Republic. Then the route was to turn westward across the Okanogan highlands to the Okanogan River about 1 mi (1.6 km) north of Johnson Creeks outlet, coinciding with the location of Riverside now. It was to then travel upriver to a point approximately 3 mi (4.8 km) south of the Bonaparte Creek outflow, now Tonasket, cross the Okanogan, and travel overland to the Methow River.

In conjunction with a much expanded state transportation plan passed in 1905 the eastern segment of unrealized Marble Mount Road was sectioned off and renamed as State Road No. 4. Funds totaling US$6,000 (equivalent to about $215,000 in 2025) were designated for road repair and bridge building along the route, while the western portion was realigned to travel west from "Republic to the town of Loomis" north west of Tonasket. Four years later the eastern terminus was shifted south across the Columbia river to the town of Wilbur in Lincoln County.

While no route changes happened, in 1910 the state highway system was revised, with route being updated in classification to a Secondary state highway and named State Road No. 4, the San Poil - Loomis Highway. Another name change, this time with route update, came in 1923. The new name Tonasket - Sanpoil Highway was given to the route along with the change from Loomis to Tonasket as its western terminus. Two years later the road was upgraded by Washington State from a Secondary Road to Primary Road designation. Twelve years after the state road system was shifted and the State Road 4 was designated as Primary State Highway No. 4, while retaining the name Tonasket - Sanpoil Highway. The terminal points were fixed as the junctions of State Highway 10 and State Highway 2. The route was unchanged until the 1964 state highway renumbering when the Sanpoil leg was renumbered to State Route 21, which ran from Wilber through Republic to the Canadian Border at Danville. The east-west section from Tonasket to Republic was combined with the road east over Sherman Pass to the Columbia and terminated at its junction with State Route 395, with the whole length being renumbered as State Route 30 (now part of State Route 20).

== Primary State Highway 5 ==
Primary State Highway 5
- Location: Seattle to Yakima
- Existed: 1937–1964

PSH 5 began at PSH 2 in Seattle and traveled south along the Green River Valley and across the Cascade Range to a junction with PSH 3 in Yakima. The section from Enumclaw to Yakima was co-signed with US 410. PSH 5 had several branch routes that connected to Renton, Tacoma, Mount Rainier National Park, and Cayuse Pass. Two branches, the White Pass Highway and Naches Pass Highway, were fully not built at the time.

During the 1964 renumbering, the trunk route of PSH 5 was divided between SR 167 from Seattle to Enumclaw and US 410 (now SR 410) from Enumclaw to Yakima. SR 167 was later rerouted away at Auburn, leaving the former highway to Enumclaw signed as SR 164. Its branches became various highways, including SR 7 from Tacoma to Morton, the former SR 14 (now US 12) from Morton to Yakima, SR 165, SR 169, and SR 706.

Branches

- PSH 5 AT (Auburn–Tacoma): Traveled southeast from Tacoma to Puyallup and north to Auburn. Now part of SR 167.
- PSH 5 CP (Cayuse Pass): Connected PSH 5 to the White Pass Highway via Cayuse Pass. It became SR 143 and was renumbered to SR 123.
- PSH 5 EF (Enumclaw–Fairfax): Connected the northwest entrance of Mount Rainier National Park to Enumclaw. Most of the highway became SR 165.
- PSH 5 EK (Elbe–Kosmos): Connected the now-defunct town of Kosmos to Morton and Elbe. It was renumbered as part of SR 7.
- PSH 5 ER (Enumclaw–Renton): Traveled north from Enumclaw to Renton, where it connected to a branch of PSH 1. It was renumbered to SR 169.
- PSH 5 SB (Sumner–Buckley): An east–west route connecting Sumner to Buckley. It was renumbered to be part of US 410 and later SR 410.
- PSH 5 TR (Tacoma–Rainier): Traveled south from Tacoma to Elbe and east to the Nisqually Entrance of Mount Rainier National Park. The north–south section became SR 7, while the remainder to the national park is now SR 706.
- PSH 5 WP (White Pass): A connector between PSH 1 and PSH 5 in Naches. Now part of US 12.
- An additional branch, the Naches Pass Highway, was not given a separate designation. It became SR 168.

== Primary State Highway 6 ==
Primary State Highway 6
- Location: Spokane to Canada–United States border
- Existed: 1937–1964

The route followed present-day U.S. Route 2 from Spokane to Newport, and State Route 31 (a portion of which is now State Route 20) from Newport to the Canada-United States border

== Primary State Highway 7 ==
Primary State Highway 7
- Location: Ellensburg to Davenport
- Existed: 1937–1964

This route followed U.S. Route 10/Interstate 90 from Ellensburg to George, State Route 281 from George to Quincy, and State Route 28 from Quincy to Davenport

== Primary State Highway 8 ==
Primary State Highway 8
- Location: Vancouver to Buena
- Existed: 1937–1964

Known as the Evergreen Highway, the route followed State Route 14 (designated as Washington State Route 12 from 1964–67) from Vancouver, Washington to Maryhill, U.S. Route 97 from Maryhill to Toppenish and State Route 22 from Toppenish to Buena.

== Primary State Highway 9 ==
Primary State Highway 9
- Location: Olympia to Mud Bay
- Existed: 1937–1964

This route followed U.S. Route 101 from Olympia to Aberdeen.

== Primary State Highway 10 ==
Primary State Highway 10
- Location: Olds Station to Canada–United States border
- Existed: 1937–1964

This route ran on U.S. Route 97 from the U.S.-Canada border to Wenatchee, and State Route 28 from Wenatchee to Quincy. A spur extended along State Route 17 from Brewster to Coulee City

== Primary State Highway 11 ==
Primary State Highway 11
- Location: Pasco to Spokane
- Existed: 1937–1964

This route followed U.S. Route 395 from Pasco to Ritzville and U.S. Route 10/Interstate 90 from Ritzville to Spokane

== Primary State Highway 12 ==
Primary State Highway 12
- Location: Chehalis to Kelso
- Existed: 1937–1964

This route followed State Route 6 from Chehalis to Raymond, and U.S. Route 101 from Raymond to Johnsons Landing, and State Route 4 from Johnsons Landing to Kelso.

== Primary State Highway 13 ==
Primary State Highway 13
- Location: Aberdeen to Raymond
- Existed: 1937–1964

This route followed U.S. Route 101 in Washington from Aberdeen to Raymond.

== Primary State Highway 14 ==
Primary State Highway 14
- Location: Hoodsport, Washington to Tacoma
- Existed: 1937–1964

This route followed State Route 16 from Hoodsport to Tacoma

== Primary State Highway 15 ==
Primary State Highway 15
- Location: Everett to Peshastin
- Existed: 1937–1964

This route followed U.S. Route 2 from Everett to Peshastin

== Primary State Highway 16 ==
Primary State Highway 16
- Location: Fredonia to Twisp
- Existed: 1937–1964

This route followed State Route 20 from Fredonia to Pateros, and State Route 153 from Pateros to Twisp

== Primary State Highway 17 ==
Primary State Highway 17
- Location: Twisp to Marblemount
- Existed: 1937–1964

== Primary State Highway 18 ==
Primary State Highway 18
- Location: George to Ritzville
- Existed: 1937–1964

The route followed the route of U.S. Route 10 (now Interstate 90) from George to Ritzville

== Primary State Highway 19 ==
Primary State Highway 19
- Location: Auburn to Bothell
- Existed: 1964

The provisional designation of a proposed outer bypass of the Seattle metropolitan area between Auburn and Bothell, also known unofficially as Interstate 605.

== Primary State Highway 21 ==
Primary State Highway 21
- Location: Kingston to Skokomish, Washington
- Existed: 1937–1964

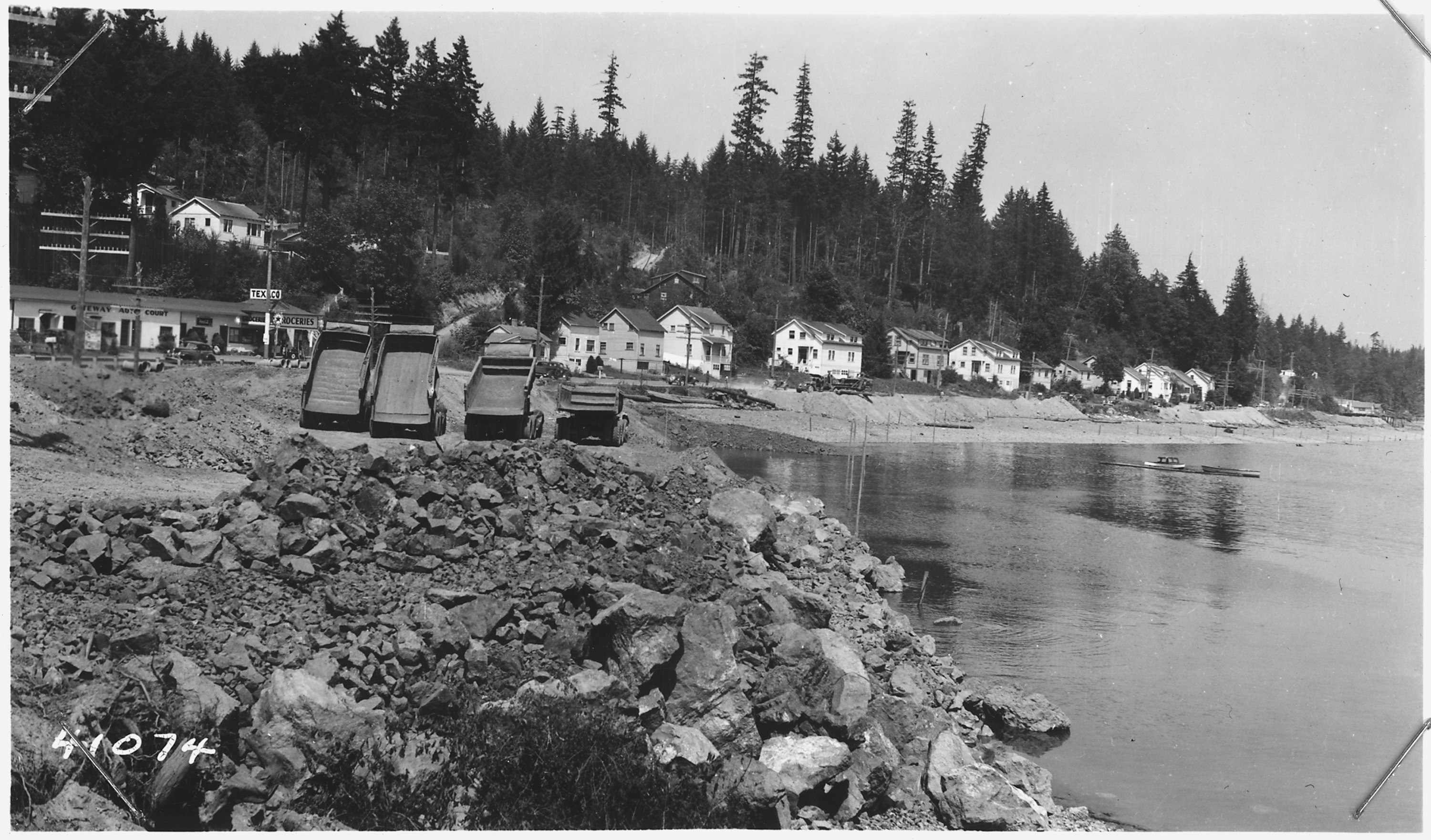
Primary State Highway No. 21, Tidewater Creek to Bremerton Section, 1941

The route followed present-day State Route 104 from the Kingston Ferry to the Hood Canal Bridge, then State Route 3 from the Hood Canal Bridge to Belfair, then State Route 106 from Belfair to Skokomish

== Primary State Highway 22 ==
Primary State Highway 22
- Location: Davenport to Canada–United States border
- Existed: 1937–1964

The route followed present-day Washington State Route 25.
