= Cliffdell, Washington =

Unincorporated community in Washington, United States

- Unincorporated community & CDP
- Location within Washington (state)
- Coordinates: 46°55′20″N 121°02′35″W
- Country: United States
- State: Washington
- County: Yakima
- Elevation: 2,474 ft (754 m)
- Time zone: UTC-8 (Pacific (PST))
  - Summer (DST): UTC-7 (PDT)
- ZIP code: 98929
- Area code: 509
- FIPS code: 53-13015
- GNIS feature ID: 2584961

Cliffdell is an unincorporated community in Yakima County, Washington, United States, located approximately 23 miles west of Ellensburg. As of the 2020 census, Cliffdell had a population of 114.

The community, located on SR 410 and the Naches River, was originally named Spring Flats. In 1920, it was renamed Cliffdell in honor of Cliff and Della Schott of Seattle. The Schotts were friends of homesteader Russell Davison, who developed much of the area for summer homes. Cliffdell was the site of a temporary army camp once used by Captain William O. Slaughter in 1855.

== Demographics ==
Historical population
Census	Pop.	Note	%±
2010	104		—
2020	114		9.6%
U.S. Decennial Census; 2000 2010

Cliffdell first appeared as a census designated place in the 2010 U.S. census.

=== Racial and ethnic composition ===
Cliffdell CDP, Washington – Racial and ethnic composition Note: the US Census treats Hispanic/Latino as an ethnic category. This table excludes Latinos from the racial categories and assigns them to a separate category. Hispanics/Latinos may be of any race.
Race / Ethnicity (NH = Non-Hispanic)	Pop 2010	Pop 2020	% 2010	% 2020
White alone (NH)	103	111	99.04%	97.37%
Black or African American alone (NH)	0	0	0.00%	0.00%
Native American or Alaska Native alone (NH)	0	0	0.00%	0.00%
Asian alone (NH)	0	1	0.00%	0.88%
Native Hawaiian or Pacific Islander alone (NH)	0	0	0.00%	0.00%
Other race alone (NH)	0	0	0.00%	0.00%
Mixed race or Multiracial (NH)	0	0	0.00%	0.00%
Hispanic or Latino (any race)	1	2	0.96%	1.75%
Total	104	114	100.00%	100.00%
