= James Longmire =

American voyager

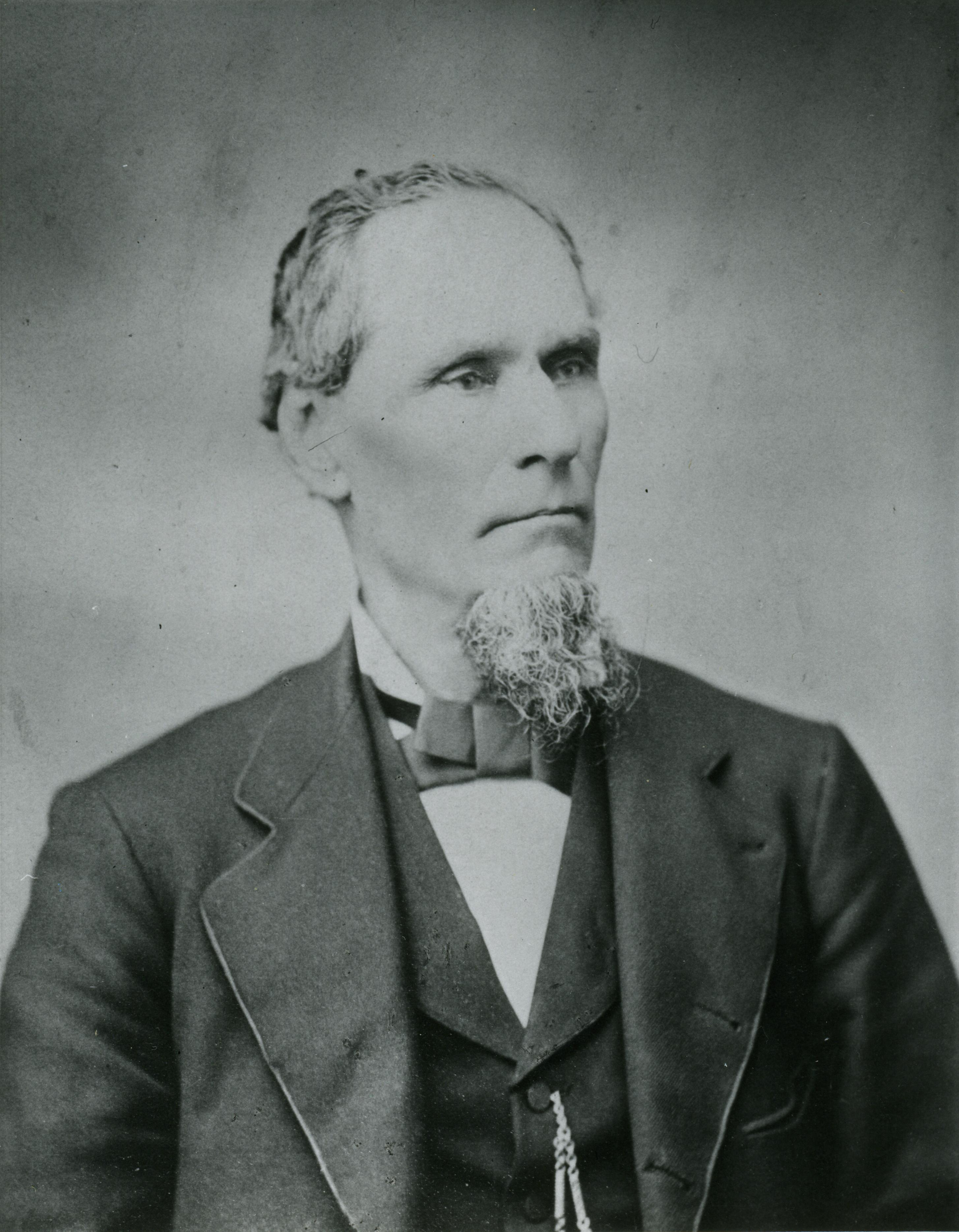
James Longmire, circa 1880-1897.

James Longmire (c. 1820 – 1897) was an American explorer and settler. He led the first wagon train on the Naches Trail across the Cascades Range at Naches Pass in 1853, and then settled on Yelm Prairie within view of Mount Rainier. His homestead became a popular stop on the way to the mountain, and he farmed and worked as a guide and surveyor. In 1883 he climbed Mount Rainier, and found a series of geothermal springs near its base. Those springs were the foundation of the Longmire Hotel and health spa he built, which at its peak had 12 rooms, which is now included in the Mount Rainier National Park, and also known as Longmire, Washington. He died 15 September 1897, in Tacoma. The town of Longmire, Washington within Mount Rainier National Park is named after him, as are Longmire Meadows in both Pierce and Kittitas counties, and a defunct post office.

Prior to his death, a narrative was recorded by James Longmire, detailing the experiences of the journey west, and experiences in the Puget Sound country. The narrative provides his first-person account of the experiences of traveling across the plains, buffalo hunting, and often relied on Native Americans to assist in fording live stock across the various rivers. He also recounts the armed conflict between the settlers and Puget Sound Indians, and his involvement in assisting a Nisqually Chief in making peace.
