= Cayuse Pass =

Mountain pass in Washington

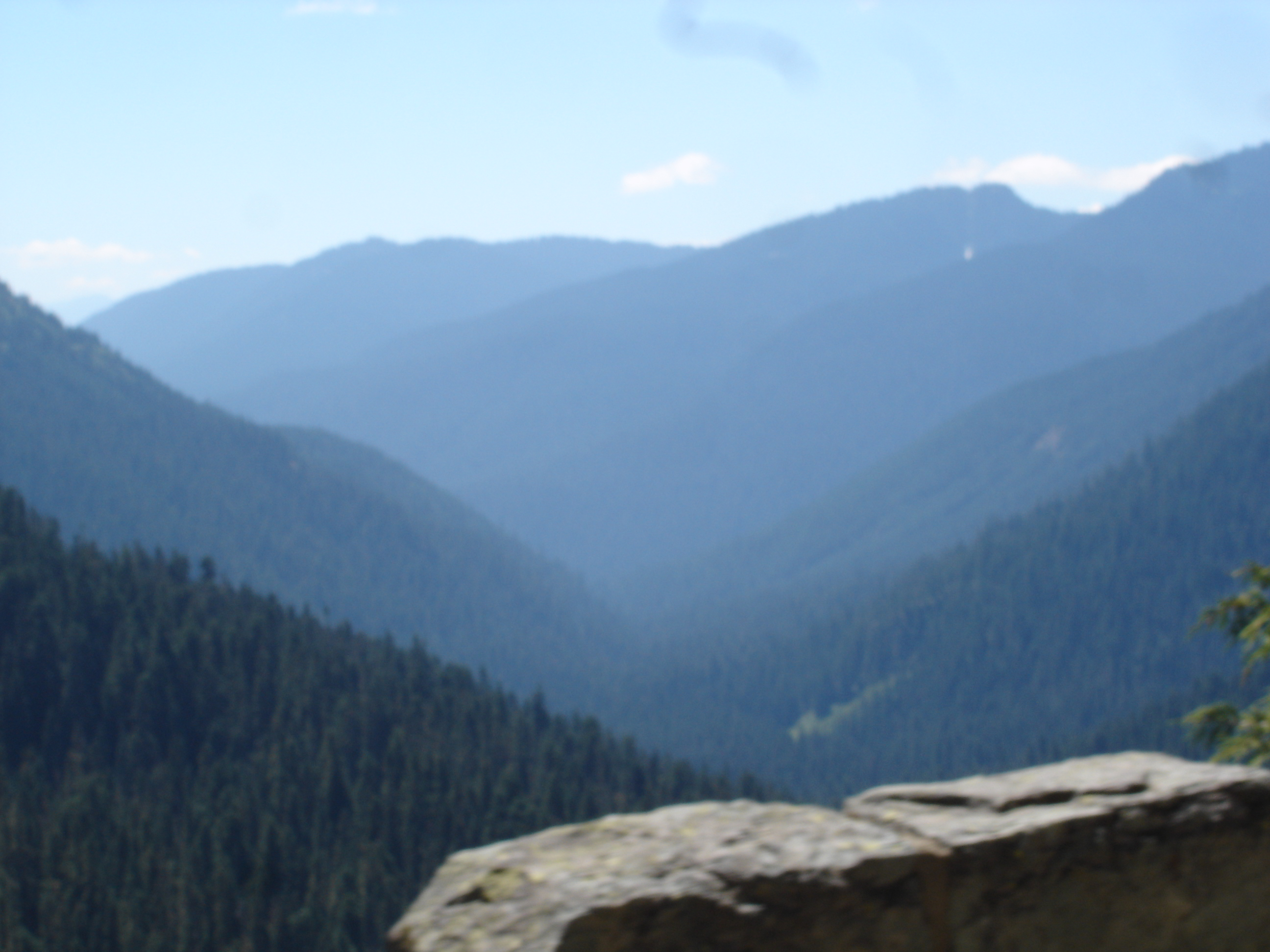
- Interactive map of Cayuse Pass
- Elevation: 4,675 ft (1,425 m)
- Traversed by: State Route 410

Third Approach
- Location: Pierce County, Washington, United States
- Range: Cascades
- Coordinates: 46°52′01″N 121°32′19″W

Cayuse Pass (el. 4,675 ft (1,425 m)) is a mountain pass in the Cascade Mountains in the state of Washington.

The pass is about 41 mi (66 km) southeast of Enumclaw on State Route 410, about 1 1/4 miles (2.0 km) west of SR410's Chinook Pass. The intersection with State Route 123 is at the pass.

The pass carries State Route 410 and State Route 123 between Packwood and Enumclaw. Because of the high elevation, Cayuse Pass is usually closed in November due to very heavy snow and significant avalanche danger. It usually opens in mid-May, and is not uncommon to have a snow depth at the summit of up to 15 ft (4.6 m).

As part of the All-American Road program, Route 410 through Cayuse Pass has been designated by the U.S. government as the Chinook Scenic Byway.

== Climate ==
Climate data for Cayuse Pass, Washington
Month	Jan	Feb	Mar	Apr	May	Jun	Jul	Aug	Sep	Oct	Nov	Dec	Year
Record high °F (°C)	60 (16)	61 (16)	60 (16)	70 (21)	73 (23)	91 (33)	85 (29)	85 (29)	83 (28)	72 (22)	61 (16)	58 (14)	91 (33)
Mean maximum °F (°C)	51 (11)	48 (9)	51 (11)	59 (15)	68 (20)	75 (24)	80 (27)	81 (27)	78 (26)	64 (18)	54 (12)	46 (8)	82 (28)
Mean daily maximum °F (°C)	35.9 (2.2)	34.1 (1.2)	37.3 (2.9)	41.5 (5.3)	49.8 (9.9)	55.2 (12.9)	65.3 (18.5)	64.4 (18.0)	58.4 (14.7)	47.3 (8.5)	37.9 (3.3)	33.2 (0.7)	46.7 (8.2)
Daily mean °F (°C)	31.0 (−0.6)	28.5 (−1.9)	31.2 (−0.4)	34.8 (1.6)	42.1 (5.6)	47.1 (8.4)	55.5 (13.1)	55.4 (13.0)	50.6 (10.3)	41.1 (5.1)	32.7 (0.4)	28.4 (−2.0)	39.9 (4.4)
Mean daily minimum °F (°C)	25.8 (−3.4)	23.0 (−5.0)	25.2 (−3.8)	28.0 (−2.2)	34.5 (1.4)	38.9 (3.8)	45.7 (7.6)	46.0 (7.8)	42.8 (6.0)	35.2 (1.8)	27.6 (−2.4)	23.8 (−4.6)	33.0 (0.6)
Mean minimum °F (°C)	10 (−12)	9 (−13)	13 (−11)	18 (−8)	24 (−4)	29 (−2)	35 (2)	35 (2)	31 (−1)	24 (−4)	16 (−9)	10 (−12)	2 (−17)
Record low °F (°C)	−9 (−23)	−10 (−23)	5 (−15)	16 (−9)	21 (−6)	24 (−4)	30 (−1)	28 (−2)	20 (−7)	13 (−11)	−1 (−18)	−6 (−21)	−10 (−23)
Average precipitation inches (mm)	12.97 (329)	11.43 (290)	10.99 (279)	6.58 (167)	4.48 (114)	2.74 (70)	0.74 (19)	1.17 (30)	2.77 (70)	6.50 (165)	11.64 (296)	12.85 (326)	84.86 (2,155)
Average extreme snow depth inches (cm)	106 (270)	138 (350)	157 (400)	157 (400)	124 (310)	68 (170)	15 (38)	1 (2.5)	1 (2.5)	9 (23)	36 (91)	78 (200)	162 (410)
Average precipitation days (≥ 0.01 in)	18.2	18.5	23.9	17.6	13.9	10.5	3.0	4.7	8.8	16.8	22.9	20.4	179.2
Source 1: National Weather Service Precipitation
Source 2: XMACIS temperature and snowdepth

== See also ==
- Chinook Pass
- Naches Pass
