= Enumclaw High School =

Location
- 226 Semanski Street South; Enumclaw, Washington 98022; United States; 47.191°N 122.006°W

Information
- Type: Public
- Established: 1961
- School district: Enumclaw School District
- Principal: Rodrick Merrell
- Teaching staff: 62.60 (FTE)
- Grades: 9–12
- Enrollment: 1,437 (2025-2026)
- Student to teacher ratio: 21.29
- Colors: Maroon and gold
- Athletics conference: NPSL 2A Olympic Division WIAA
- Mascot: Hornet
- Rivals: White River High School
- Website: ehs.enumclaw.wednet.edu

Enumclaw High School is a public school in Enumclaw, Washington, United States. The school serves about 1300 students from Enumclaw as well as local unincorporated regions of King County and cities such as Black Diamond and Greenwater. The Hornet, the school's mascot, is represented by the colors maroon and gold.

== Athletics ==
Enumclaw High School sports teams compete in the Olympic Division of the North Puget Sound League, under the auspices of the WIAA, and previously competed in the SPSL 3A division. Its rival school's team is the White River High School Hornets. The Hornets were the 2008, 2009, 2011, 2012, and 2015 Washington state wrestling champions of division 3A. The 2010 Boys Basketball team went on a 27–0 run before losing in the championship game to Union High School (Camas, Washington) by one point in the last 10 seconds of the game because of a controversial foul called sending a Union guard to the line. 1977 WIAA Baseball Champions. Enumclaw High School has also had success in gymnastics, with state titles in 2012 & 2013.

Enumclaw High School offers the following athletics:

Boys

Baseball, Basketball, Cross-country, Football, Golf, Soccer, Swim & Dive, Tennis, Track, Water Polo, Wrestling

Girls

Basketball, Cross-country, Golf, Gymnastics, Soccer, Softball-Fastpitch, Swim & Dive, Tennis, Track, Volleyball, Water Polo, Wrestling

CoEd

Unified Basketball, Unified Soccer

== Musicals ==
- 2006 – Bye Bye Birdie
- 2007 – Chicago
- 2008 – It's A Bird, It's A Plane, It's Superman! The Musical
- 2009 – Titanic: The Musical
- 2010 – Peter Pan
- 2010 – Sweeney Todd
- 2011 – The Drowsy Chaperone
- 2012 – Les Misérables
- 2013 – Legally Blonde
- 2014 – Cabaret
- 2015 – The Addams Family
- 2016 – State Fair
- 2017 – Urinetown
- 2018 – Spamalot
- 2019 – The 25th Annual Putnam County Spelling Bee
- 2020 – Hello, Dolly! (canceled due to COVID-19)
- 2021 – Alone Together (original show)
- 2022 – Little Shop of Horrors
- 2023 – Mamma Mia!

== Instrumental/choir program ==
=== Instrumental awards ===
- 2019 – state champion for small percussion ensemble (The Pythagorean Brotherhood)

== Marching band ==
=== Shows ===
- 2008 – Motown
- 2013 – Salute to America
- 2014 – Phantom of the Opera
- 2015 – Skyrim
- 2016 – Divergent
- 2017 – Invincible
- 2018 – Rach and Roll
- 2019 – Outside the Box

=== Awards ===
==== Auburn Veterans Day 2019 ====
- Parade: 1st Place, A Division
- Field Show: 1st Place, A Division
- Best Marching
- Best Percussion
- Best Music
- Best General Effect

== Notable alumni ==
- T. R. Bryden (1977), high school state baseball champion and former MLB player (California Angels)
- Kasey Kahne (1999), stock car racing driver with 18 NASCAR Cup series wins
- Brian Scalabrine (1996), former basketball player for the New Jersey Nets, Chicago Bulls, and NBA Champion with the Boston Celtics (2008)
- Tony Tost (1993), poet, critic, and screenwriter
