= Greenwater, Washington =

- CDP
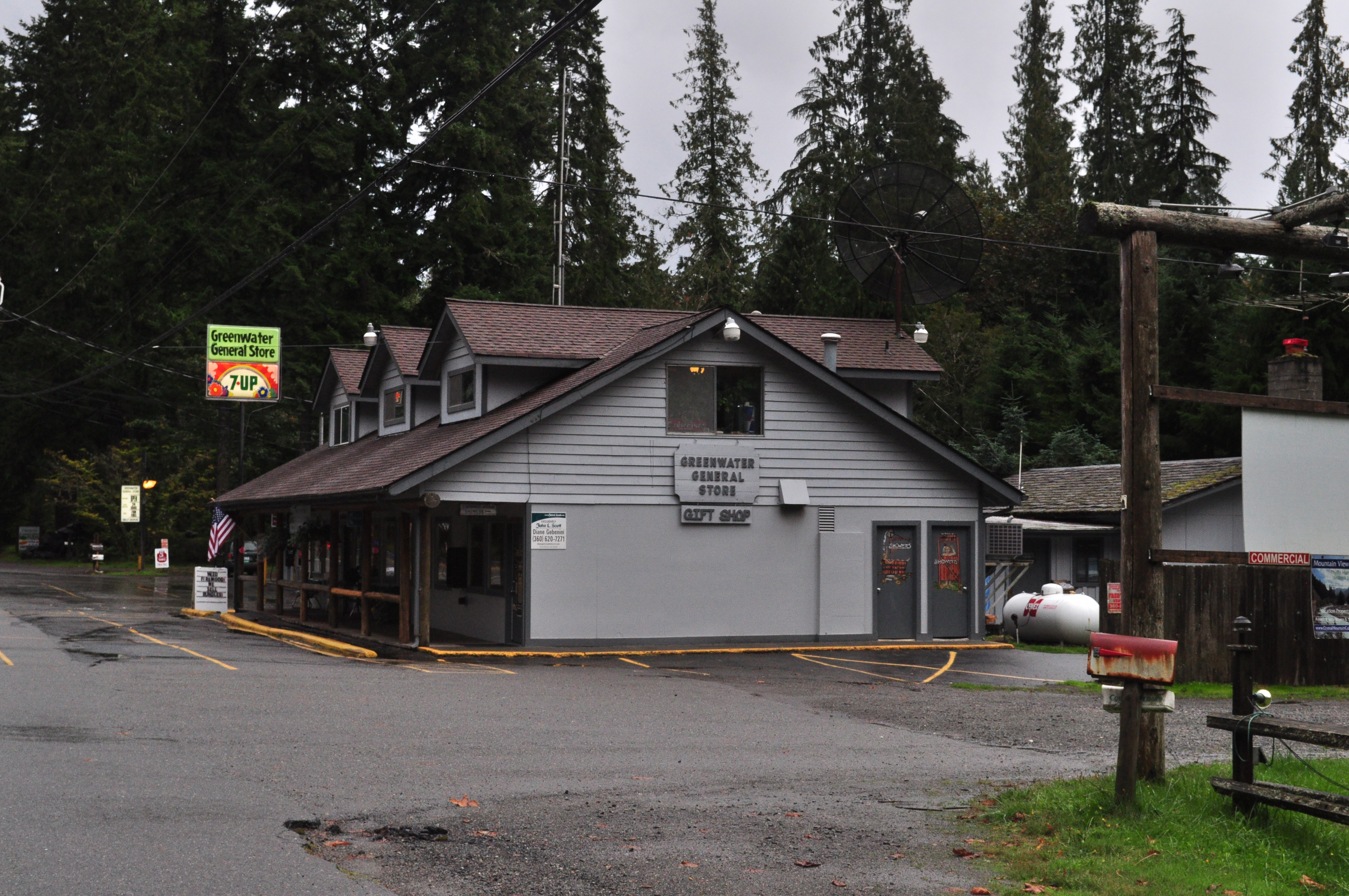
- Greenwater General Store, 2013

- Location of Greenwater, Washington
- Coordinates: 47°08′36″N 121°37′26″W
- Country: United States
- State: Washington
- County: Pierce

Area
  - Total: 1.5 sq mi (3.9 km^{2})
  - Land: 1.5 sq mi (3.9 km^{2})
  - Water: 0 sq mi (0.0 km^{2})
- Elevation: 1,805 ft (550 m)

Population (2020)
  - Total: 95
  - Density: 63/sq mi (24/km^{2})
- Time zone: UTC-8 (Pacific (PST))
  - Summer (DST): UTC-7 (PDT)
- ZIP Code: 98022
- Area code(s): 360, 564
- FIPS code: 53-28695
- GNIS feature ID: 2408335

Greenwater is a census-designated place (CDP) in the northwest United States in Pierce County, Washington. Southeast of Seattle, the population was 67 at the 2010 census, down from 91 in 2000. At the 2020 census, the population was 95.

Based on per capita income, Greenwater ranks 17th of 522 areas in the state of Washington to be ranked, and is the highest in Pierce County. East of Enumclaw on Highway 410, Greenwater gains much of its popularity as a town for hikers and skiers on their way south to Mount Rainier National Park and Crystal Mountain ski area.

Three popular campgrounds reside in Greenwater: Silver Springs, The Dalles, and Buck Creek.

== Geography ==
According to the United States Census Bureau, the CDP has a total area of 1.5 square miles (3.9 km^{2}), all of it land.

Greenwater is located at the confluence of the Greenwater and White Rivers.

=== Climate ===
Greenwater has a warm-summer Mediterranean climate (Csb) according to the Köppen climate classification system.

Climate data for Greenwater
Month	Jan	Feb	Mar	Apr	May	Jun	Jul	Aug	Sep	Oct	Nov	Dec	Year
Record high °F (°C)	62 (17)	71 (22)	73 (23)	84 (29)	92 (33)	95 (35)	102 (39)	100 (38)	97 (36)	88 (31)	67 (19)	64 (18)	102 (39)
Mean daily maximum °F (°C)	36.6 (2.6)	42.2 (5.7)	46.6 (8.1)	53.9 (12.2)	61.8 (16.6)	66.1 (18.9)	73.1 (22.8)	72.4 (22.4)	67.5 (19.7)	56.1 (13.4)	44.2 (6.8)	38.2 (3.4)	54.9 (12.7)
Mean daily minimum °F (°C)	26 (−3)	29.3 (−1.5)	30.1 (−1.1)	33.6 (0.9)	39.2 (4.0)	44.2 (6.8)	46.7 (8.2)	46.1 (7.8)	42.1 (5.6)	36.8 (2.7)	31.5 (−0.3)	28.8 (−1.8)	36.2 (2.3)
Record low °F (°C)	−8 (−22)	−5 (−21)	3 (−16)	19 (−7)	25 (−4)	26 (−3)	30 (−1)	28 (−2)	22 (−6)	15 (−9)	3 (−16)	−8 (−22)	−8 (−22)
Average precipitation inches (mm)	7.85 (199)	6.02 (153)	4.86 (123)	4.26 (108)	3.01 (76)	2.76 (70)	1.15 (29)	1.62 (41)	3.29 (84)	5.33 (135)	7.89 (200)	9 (230)	57.03 (1,449)
Average snowfall inches (cm)	24.2 (61)	13.6 (35)	12.4 (31)	3.2 (8.1)	0.1 (0.25)	0 (0)	0 (0)	0 (0)	0 (0)	0.2 (0.51)	5.5 (14)	16.4 (42)	75.6 (192)
Average precipitation days	19	17	19	18	16	13	7	8	11	15	19	21	183

== Demographics ==
Historical population
Census	Pop.	Note	%±
2000	91		—
2010	67		−26.4%
2020	95		41.8%
U.S. Decennial Census; 1990 2000 2010

Greenwater first appeared as a census designated place in the 2000 U.S. census.

=== Racial and ethnic composition ===
Greenwater CDP, Washington – Racial and ethnic composition Note: the US Census treats Hispanic/Latino as an ethnic category. This table excludes Latinos from the racial categories and assigns them to a separate category. Hispanics/Latinos may be of any race.
Race / Ethnicity (NH = Non-Hispanic)	Pop 2000	Pop 2010	Pop 2020	% 2000	% 2010	% 2020
White alone (NH)	83	65	85	91.21%	97.01%	89.47%
Black or African American alone (NH)	0	0	3	0.00%	0.00%	3.16%
Native American or Alaska Native alone (NH)	2	0	1	2.20%	0.00%	1.05%
Asian alone (NH)	0	2	0	0.00%	2.99%	0.00%
Native Hawaiian or Pacific Islander alone (NH)	1	0	0	1.10%	0.00%	0.00%
Other race alone (NH)	0	0	0	0.00%	0.00%	0.00%
Mixed race or Multiracial (NH)	4	0	1	4.40%	0.00%	1.05%
Hispanic or Latino (any race)	1	0	5	1.10%	0.00%	5.26%
Total	91	67	95	100.00%	100.00%	100.00%

=== 2000 census ===
As of the census of 2000, there were 91 people, 46 households, and 17 families residing in the CDP. The population density was 61.2 people per square mile (23.6/km^{2}). There were 65 housing units at an average density of 43.7/sq mi (16.8/km^{2}). The racial makeup of the CDP was 92.31% White, 2.20% Native American, 1.10% Pacific Islander, and 4.40% from two or more races. Hispanic or Latino of any race were 1.10% of the population.

There were 46 households, out of which 6.5% had children under the age of 18 living with them, 30.4% were married couples living together, 4.3% had a female householder with no partner present, and 60.9% were non-families. 37.0% of all households were made up of individuals, and 4.3% had someone living alone who was 65 years of age or older. The average household size was 1.98 and the average family size was 2.61.

In the CDP, the population was spread out, with 8.8% under the age of 18, 16.5% from 18 to 24, 35.2% from 25 to 44, 34.1% from 45 to 64, and 5.5% who were 65 years of age or older. The median age was 41 years. For every 100 females, there were 122.0 males. For every 100 females age 18 and over, there were 112.8 males.

The median income for a household in the CDP was $39,545, and the median income for a family was $75,487. Males had a median income of $75,282 versus $41,250 for females. The per capita income for the CDP was $36,466. None of the population or families were below the poverty line.
