= Greenwater River =

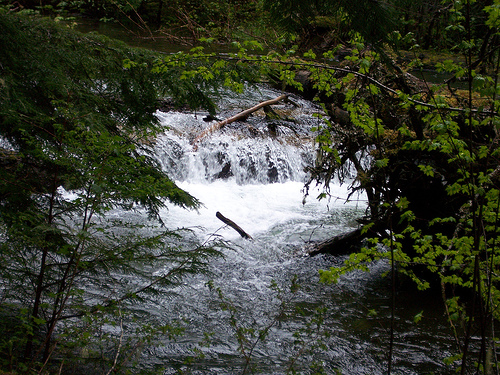
- Greenwater River near Greenwater Lakes

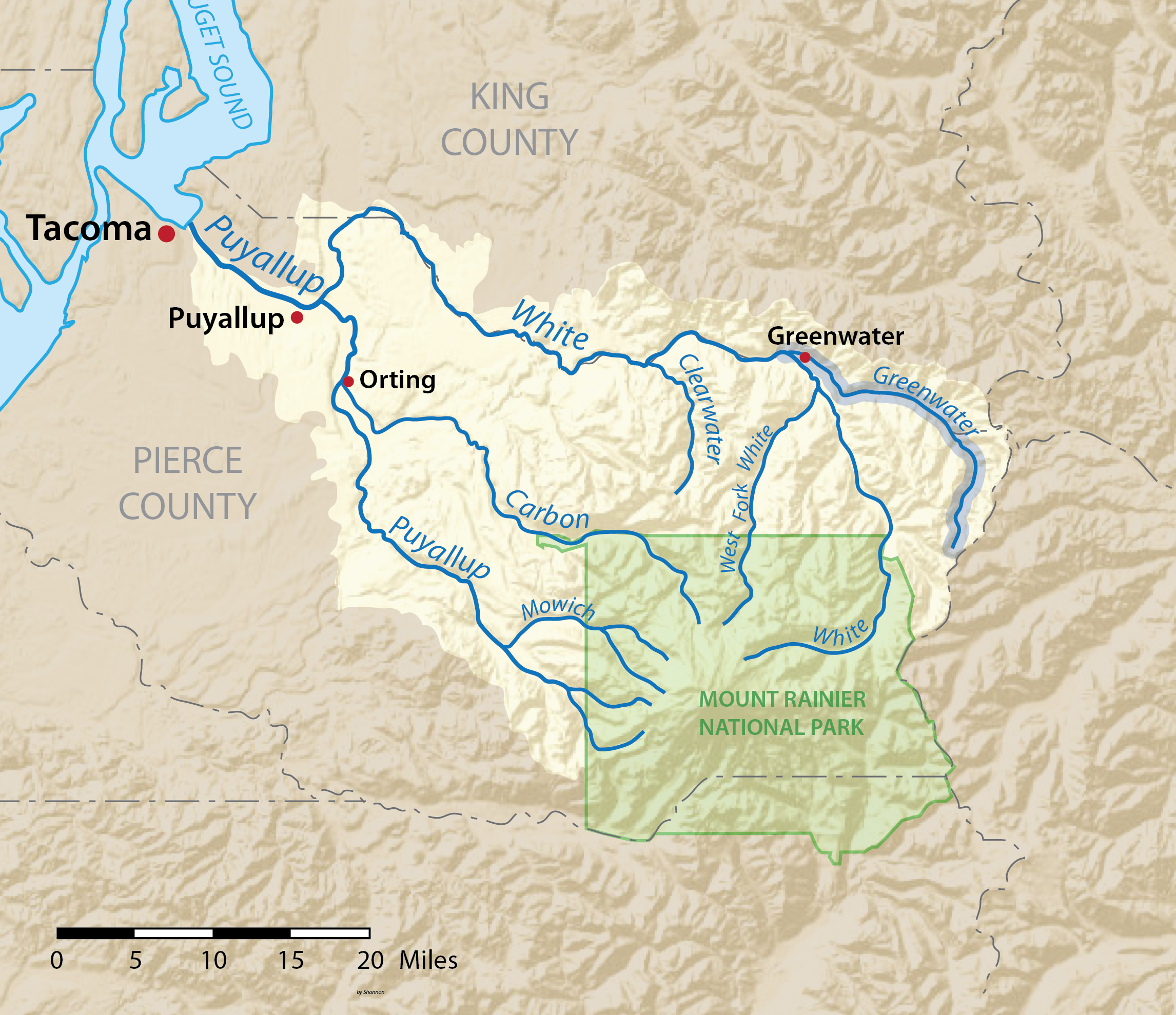
- The Greenwater River is shown highlighted in the Puyallup River watershed

- Location of the mouth of the Greenwater River in Washington Greenwater River (the United States)

Location
- Country: United States
- State: Washington
- Counties: King, Pierce

Physical characteristics
- Source: Cascade Range
  - coordinates: 46°59′3″N 121°27′15″W
  - elevation: 5,860 ft (1,790 m)
- Mouth: White River
  - location: Greenwater
  - coordinates: 47°09′34″N 121°39′42″W
  - elevation: 1,680 ft (510 m)

Basin features
- Tributaries
  - left: George Creek (Greenwater River)
  - right: Meadow Creek (Greenwater River)

The Greenwater River is a river in the U.S. state of Washington. Its watershed drains a portion of the Cascade Range east and northeast of Mount Rainier, including parts of the Norse Peak Wilderness. The Greenwater River flows into the White River at Greenwater, which eventually flows into Puget Sound via the Puyallup River. The Greenwater River defines part of the boundary between King and Pierce counties.

== Course ==
The Greenwater River rises in eastern Pierce County, in the Norse Peaks Wilderness near Corral Pass. Along with a few headwater tributaries, it drains the north side of Castle Mountain. The Greenwater flows north, through Hidden Lake and then Echo Lake. After Echo Lake the river bends slightly westward, collects the tributary streams Maggie Creek, Lost Creek, and Meadow Creek, then turning more fully west.

Meadow Creek rises near Naches Pass, flowing through Government Meadows before joining the Greenwater River. The boundary between King and Pierce counties follows Meadow Creek down from Naches Pass. Then the boundary follows the Greenwater for the rest of its course to the White River.

Below Meadow Creek, the Greenwater River passes through two small ponds called Greenwater Lakes. It collects a number of tributary streams as it flows west, including George Creek, which flows from George Lake near Noble Knob, and Pyramid Creek, which flows from its source at Pyramid Peak.

As the Greenwater River approaches the White River, it is flanked by Huckleberry Mountain to the north and Dalles Ridge to the south. The Greenwater River joins the White River at the small community of Greenwater.

== See also ==
- List of Washington rivers
