= Elbe, Washington =

- CDP
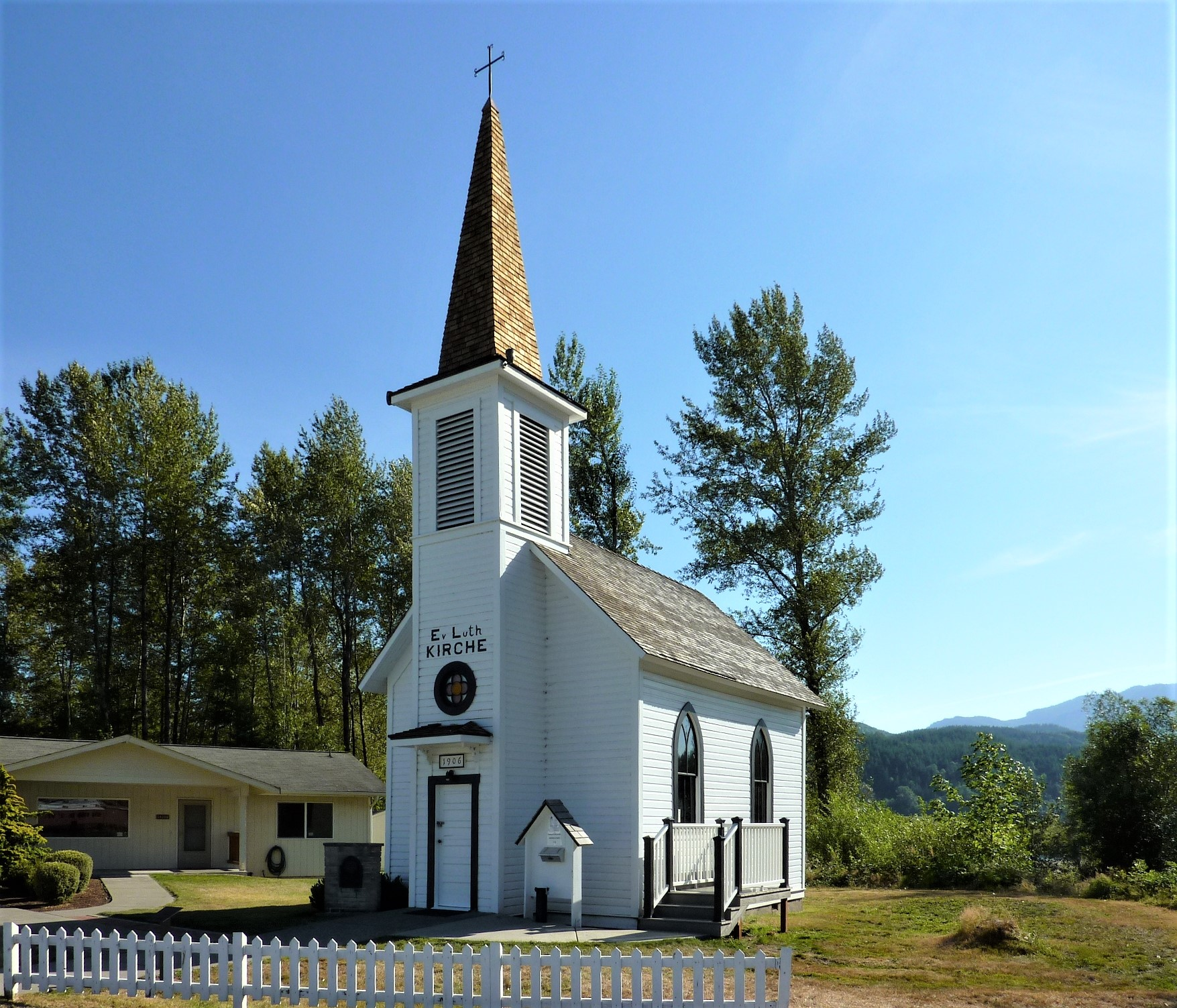
- The Little White Church of Elbe

- Location of Elbe, Washington
- Coordinates: 46°45′55″N 122°11′44″W
- Country: United States
- State: Washington
- County: Pierce

Area
  - Total: 0.039 sq mi (0.1 km^{2})
  - Land: 0.039 sq mi (0.1 km^{2})
  - Water: 0 sq mi (0.0 km^{2})
- Elevation: 1,211 ft (369 m)

Population (2020)
  - Total: 39
  - Density: 1,000/sq mi (390/km^{2})
- Time zone: UTC-8 (Pacific (PST))
  - Summer (DST): UTC-7 (PDT)
- ZIP Code: 98330
- Area code(s): 360, 564
- FIPS code: 53-20890
- GNIS feature ID: 2408065

Elbe (/ˈɛlbiː/) is a census-designated place (CDP) in Pierce County, Washington, United States. The population was 39 at the 2020 census.

== Etymology ==
Known as Brown's Junction after the Tacoma & Eastern Railway was built in the region, there are similar but competing theories on the change of the community's name to Elbe. When a post office was requested, a shorter name was demanded and a meeting of settlers decided to honor the pioneer settler Henry C. Lutkens who had come from the valley of the Elbe in Germany. Another hypothesis suggests the settlers of the area, whom hailed as a group from the Elbe Valley, derived the moniker based on the similarities of the Elbe and the Nisqually Rivers.

== History ==
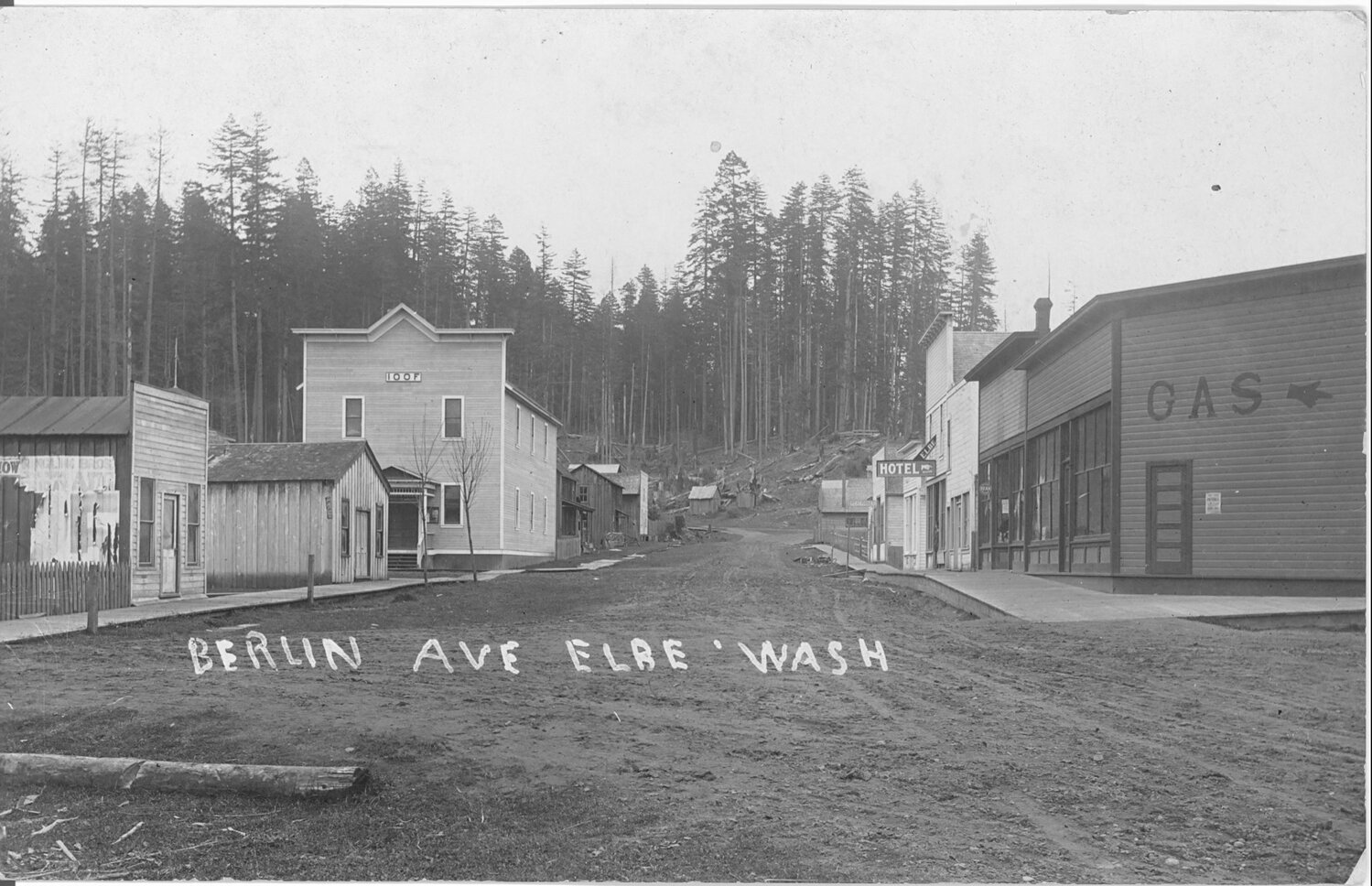
Downtown Elbe, early 20th century

In 1888 the first settlers came to the forests on the Nisqually River. Some of them were the German emigrants Karl Lütkens and Adam Sachs. Karl Lütkens, who was only 19 at the time, was so enthusiastic about his new home that he persuaded his parents Heinrich and Christina Lütkens to come to America as well. These left their previous home in Todendorf in the district Stormarn in Schleswig-Holstein and arrived in America in 1891. The first settlers in this area also included Ferdinand Selle, Christian Fritz, Louis Schuffenhauer, Christian Kruse, Max Ogans, Hans Bartels, Fred Duke, W. Lawrence, Levi Engel, Vincent Rotter, R. Schmidt, Frank Salzer, Gus Stoll and Christian Weilandt. The small town grew, and on June 4, 1892, a post office was already established here.

The economic development of the place in the following years was good. Nearby Mount Rainier was the destination of many tourists who took a break on their way to Elbe. In 1894 Heinrich Lütkens and his son Karl built a tourist hotel with 48 rooms. Ferdinand Selle had previously built a hotel, but it burned down after a short time. At that time, the village blacksmith Levi Engel was temporarily the editor of a newspaper called "Elbe Union". With his plate camera, Engel accompanied village life for many years. In 1894 a town hall was also built, in which various events, including dance events, took place.

In 1895 Heinrich Lütkens and his family had a special reunion. From Hamfelde in the district Herzogtum Lauenburg in Schleswig-Holstein was Carl Böttcher, the brother-in-law of Lütkens, emigrated with his family and settled in a neighboring town of Elbe.

The town began to experience an increase in tourism after Elbe was connected to the Tacoma Eastern Railroad rail network in 1904 and the Road to Paradise, which became Washington State Route 706, was completed in 1911. Another large hotel and several restaurants were built. The local co-founder Adam Sachs opened a department store during this time. Two years later, the villagers built a church. The building material and the plot of land were donated by Heinrich Lütkens. Until the opening of the church, the residents of Elbe had celebrated their services in private houses or in the town hall. In 1909 Elbe already had 250 inhabitants and in the course of the 20th century the population rose to 437.

== Geography ==
According to the United States Census Bureau, the CDP has a total area of 0.039 square miles (0.10 km^{2}), all of it land.

Elbe is located approximately 29 miles (47 km) south of Seattle and approximately 87 miles (140 km) north of Portland, Oregon. Mount Rainier is approximately 21 miles (34 km) northeast.

=== Climate ===
Elbe has a warm-summer Mediterranean climate (Köppen Csb) typical for the North Coast, characterized by warm (occasionally hot) dry summers, and mild to chilly, rainy and snowy winters. In Elbe's case the climate is moderated by the proximity to the Pacific Ocean with small temperature variations on average throughout the year, resulting in mild year-round temperatures, although winter can get cool with freezing and snow. Average high temperatures range from 43.3 °F (6.3 °C) in December to 76.7 °F (24.8 °C) in August. Elbe on average has very wet winters and summers with a few days of rainfall, also representative for the region. Temperatures of above 32 °F (0 °C) are common with measurable snowfall.

Climate data for Elbe, WA
Month	Jan	Feb	Mar	Apr	May	Jun	Jul	Aug	Sep	Oct	Nov	Dec	Year
Mean daily maximum °F (°C)	44.8 (7.1)	48.6 (9.2)	52.5 (11.4)	57.3 (14.1)	63.7 (17.6)	69.1 (20.6)	75.8 (24.3)	76.7 (24.8)	71.3 (21.8)	60.2 (15.7)	49.1 (9.5)	43.3 (6.3)	59.4 (15.2)
Mean daily minimum °F (°C)	32.3 (0.2)	32.0 (0.0)	34.7 (1.5)	37.5 (3.1)	42.9 (6.1)	47.8 (8.8)	51.5 (10.8)	51.0 (10.6)	45.9 (7.7)	39.8 (4.3)	35.1 (1.7)	31.1 (−0.5)	40.1 (4.5)
Average precipitation inches (mm)	8.2 (210)	6.0 (150)	6.0 (150)	4.0 (100)	4.1 (100)	3.4 (86)	1.4 (36)	1.4 (36)	2.8 (71)	5.3 (130)	9.8 (250)	7.1 (180)	59.5 (1,499)
Average snowfall inches (cm)	5.2 (13)	2.7 (6.9)	1.0 (2.5)	0.3 (0.76)	0 (0)	0 (0)	0 (0)	0 (0)	0 (0)	0 (0)	1.1 (2.8)	3.9 (9.9)	14.2 (35.86)
Average precipitation days	18	14	17	16	15	12	6	6	8	13	18	17	160

== Demographics ==
Historical population
Census	Pop.	Note	%±
2000	21		—
2010	29		38.1%
2020	39		34.5%
U.S. Decennial Census; 1990 2000 2010

Elbe first appeared as a census designated place in the 2000 U.S. census.

=== Racial and ethnic composition ===
Elbe CDP, Washington – Racial and ethnic composition Note: the US Census treats Hispanic/Latino as an ethnic category. This table excludes Latinos from the racial categories and assigns them to a separate category. Hispanics/Latinos may be of any race.
Race / Ethnicity (NH = Non-Hispanic)	Pop 2000	Pop 2010	Pop 2020	% 2000	% 2010	% 2020
White alone (NH)	21	28	30	100.00%	96.55%	76.92%
Black or African American alone (NH)	0	0	1	0.00%	0.00%	2.56%
Native American or Alaska Native alone (NH)	0	0	1	0.00%	0.00%	2.56%
Asian alone (NH)	0	0	1	0.00%	0.00%	2.56%
Native Hawaiian or Pacific Islander alone (NH)	0	0	0	0.00%	0.00%	0.00%
Other race alone (NH)	0	0	2	0.00%	0.00%	5.13%
Mixed race or Multiracial (NH)	0	1	2	0.00%	3.45%	5.13%
Hispanic or Latino (any race)	0	0	2	0.00%	0.00%	5.13%
Total	21	29	39	100.00%	100.00%	100.00%

=== 2000 census ===
The estimated population of Elbe is 54 as of 2018, almost double the 29 residents counted in the 2010 U.S. census. At the 2020 census, the population was reported to be 39 people.

As of the census of 2000, there were 21 people, 10 households, and 7 families residing in the CDP. The population density was 818.2 people per square mile (270.3/km^{2}). There were 10 housing units at an average density of 389.6/sq mi (128.7/km^{2}). The racial makeup of the CDP was 100.00% White.

There were 10 households, out of which 30.0% had children under the age of 18 living with them, 40.0% were married couples living together, none had a female householder with no husband present, and 30.0% were non-families. 30.0% of all households were made up of individuals, and 30.0% had someone living alone who is 65 years of age or older. The average household size was 2.10 and the average family size was 2.57.

In the CDP, the population was spread out, with 28.6% under the age of 18, 23.8% from 25 to 44, 9.5% from 45 to 64, and 38.1% who were 65 years of age or older. The median age was 45 years. For every 100 females, there were 162.5 males. For every 100 females age 18 and over, there were 200.0 males.

The median income for a household in the CDP was $13,750, and the median income for a family was $0. Males had a median income of $0 versus $0 for females. The per capita income for the CDP was $13,863. None of the population or families were below the poverty line.

== Arts and culture ==
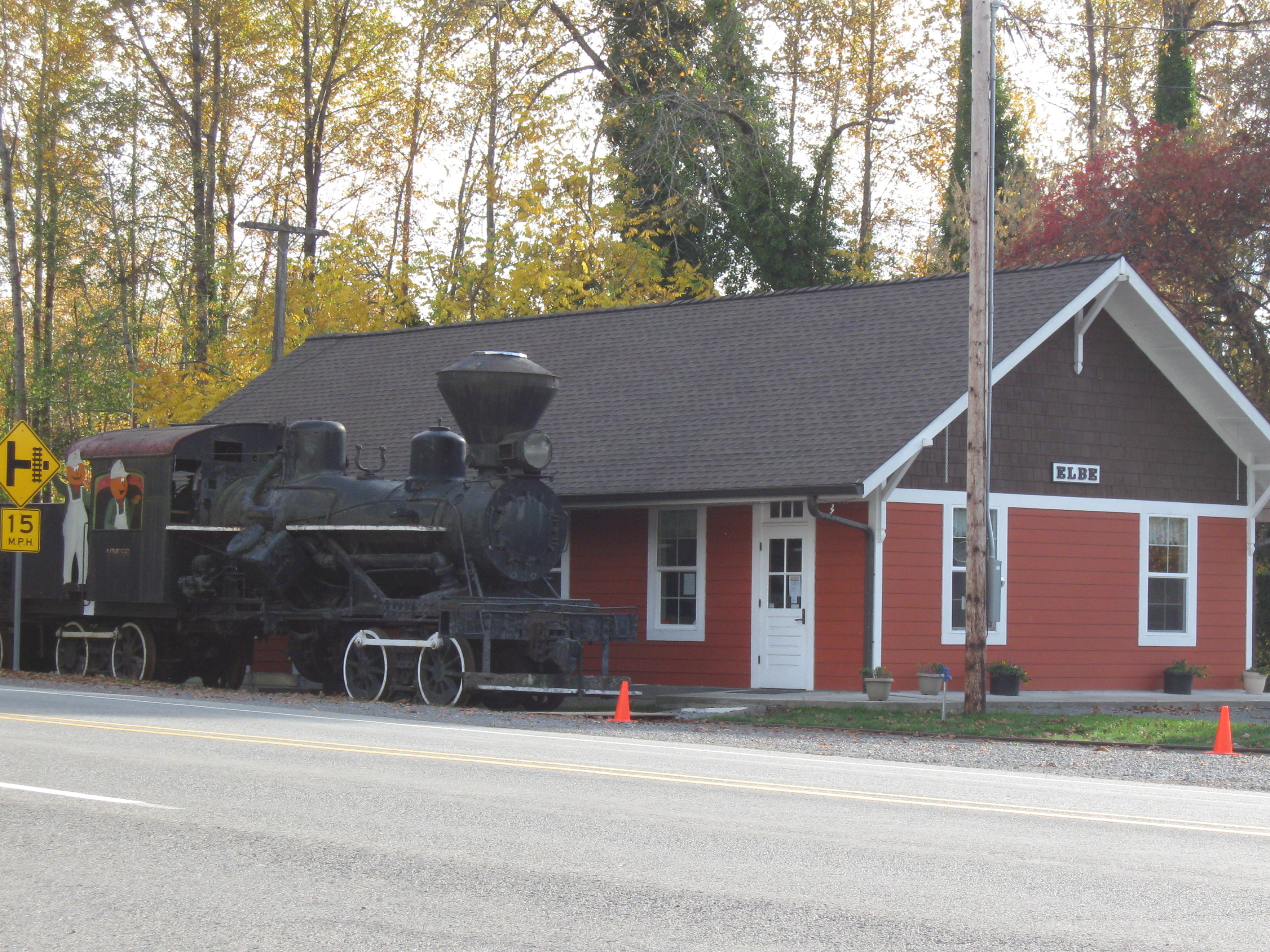
Elbe train depot

=== Historical buildings and sites ===
The Elbe Market Country Store was built as a meeting hall by the International Order of Odd Fellows (IOOF) in 1906. The building was moved after the construction of the Road to Paradise and once had a functional second-story. As of 2024, the structure retains much of its original Wild West inspired architecture and design. A 14 foot (4.3 m) welcome statue of a Bigfoot, officially known as Mount Rainier Bigfoot but informally nicknamed Howard, was installed at the store in 2024.

==== The Little White Church of Elbe ====
The Elbe Evangelical Lutheran Church is a small church with the German inscription “Ev. Luth. KIRCHE”, which was built in 1906 by the inhabitants according to the plans of Reverend Karl Kilian. The church is 24.0 by 18.0 ft (7.3 by 5.5 m) and can accommodate 46 people. The height of the church tower is 46 ft (14 m). The church has since been restored and added to the National Register of Historic Places on October 8, 1976. Church services take place once a month from March to December.

==== Mt. Rainier Scenic Railroad ====
A railway line that runs from Elbe to the settlement of Mineral is operated with steam locomotives and historic cars. The route leads through forests, crosses the Nisqually River and ends at the Mt. Rainier Railroad and Logging Museum in Mineral.

==== Mt. Rainier National Park ====
Mount Rainier National Park can be reached from Elbe via the National Park Highway after about 14 miles (23 km).

== Infrastructure ==
- Mountain Highway (State Route 7)
- State Route 706

The town has a rest area (no water), which cost over $3 million.

The community is among 8 locations that are part of an EV installation project on the White Pass Scenic Byway. The program will stretch from the White Pass Ski Area to Chehalis and is run in partnership with Lewis County PUD, Twin Transit, state government agencies, and local community efforts. The venture began in 2023 from two grants totaling over $1.8 million.
