= Naches Pass =

Mountain pass in Washington

- Interactive map of Naches Pass
- Elevation: 4,928 ft (1,502 m)

Location
- Location: Washington, United States
- Range: Cascades
- Coordinates: 47°05′13″N 121°22′46″W

Naches Pass (elevation 4,928 feet (1,502 m)) is a mountain pass in the Cascade Range in the state of Washington. It is located about 50 miles (80 km) east of Tacoma and about 50 miles (80 km) northwest of Yakima, near the headwaters of tributary streams of the Naches River on the east and the Greenwater River on the west. The boundaries of Pierce, King, Kittitas, and Yakima counties come together at the pass. The pass lies on the boundary between the Mount Baker-Snoqualmie and Wenatchee National Forests, about 10 miles (16 km) northeast of Mount Rainier National Park. There are no roadways or railways crossing the pass.

Native peoples used trails over the pass before the arrival of white settlers. Throughout the 1800s, the United States, Washington Territory, and private parties explored the construction of a wagon road or railroad over the pass, but nearly all such attempts failed. By 1855, nearby Snoqualmie Pass had been established as a far superior route over the mountains, being 1,913 feet (583 m) lower. In 1943, a proposal to construct a highway was written into state law and remains as the proposed State Route 168 – however, no highway has ever been built, and the trails over the pass are usable only for hiking and other recreation.

== History ==
=== Early history ===
The old Native American route known as the Naches Trail traveled over Naches Pass and through the Cascade Mountains to connect the various Salish people on the west side (Nisqually and Puyallup) to the Yakima people on the east side of the mountains. The principal items of trade were fish and horses.

In 1839 George Simpson, the governor of the Hudson's Bay Company (HBC), directed Pierre-Chrysologue Pambrun, the HBC clerk in charge of Fort Nez Percés (Walla Walla), to scout out a trail over the Cascade mountains from Walla Walla to Fort Nisqually in southern Puget Sound, where Simpson planned to settle a group of families from Red River Colony (today's Winnipeg, Manitoba). Accompanied by Cornelius Rogers, an associate of Dr. Marcus Whitman at Waillatpu mission, Pambrun crossed Naches pass. In the summer of 1841 Lieutenant Charles Wilkes of the United States Exploring Expedition directed Lieutenant Robert E. Johnson to proceed east over the Cascades via the Naches Pass. The expedition followed the existing Indian trail around the northern flank of Mount Rainier and over the pass. They proceeded to Fort Colvile and Fort Okanogan east of the mountains.

=== Road construction attempts ===
The fledgling settlements of Puget Sound were slow to develop in part due to lack of easy access. In 1850, M.T. Simmons, one of the first pioneer settlers of the region, led an effort to cut a road over Naches Pass, but the heavy forest and steep ridges made the effort difficult and the attempt failed. Emigrants arriving in Portland, Oregon Territory, who wished to continue north had to slog up the muddy Cowlitz Trail, first by river and then overland, to the southern end of Puget Sound. One of the first tasks taken up by Washington Territory when it was separated from Oregon Territory was to build a wagon road over the Cascades that aimed to divert emigrants heading to the Willamette valley to Puget Sound instead.

Unwilling to wait for the slow-moving federal government to act, and in order to attract 1853 emigrants already en route, the citizens of Puget Sound collected funds to send Edward Jay Allen, John Edgar, George Shazer and Whitfield Kirtley into the field to survey the Naches Pass route to determine its suitability as a wagon road. The road viewers departed June 1, 1853, and sixteen days later broke out into the open prairies of eastern Washington. Their conclusion was that a wagon road could be built. Allen hurried back to Olympia with the news, leaving for posterity his personal, detailed account of that exploration.

Meanwhile, Captain George B. McClellan received specific orders in April, 1853 from both Governor Isaac Stevens and Secretary of War Jefferson Davis to search the Cascade passes for an appropriate route for a military wagon road, to build the road in time for use by that fall's emigrant migration, and to determine the suitability of the various passes as a route for a future railroad. He left Columbia Barracks (today's Vancouver, Washington) and slowly worked his way into the Cascade Mountains.

As it became clear that McClellan would not have a road constructed by fall (if ever), the citizens of Puget Sound took it upon themselves to build that road. Funds were solicited to supply two teams of road builders. One team, led by Edward Jay Allen, worked east from the Puyallup valley to Naches Pass and a few miles beyond. The second team, led by Whitfield Kirtley, was to work west, finishing the road between Yakima and the pass. Unfortunately this team "fell out among themselves" and returned to Olympia within a month, accomplishing little beyond marking the route with blazes.

On August 25, 1853, McClellan finally made his way to Naches Pass, deemed it unfit for a railroad, and continued north. On September 12 Andrew Moore, a member of Olympia's road committee, tracked the captain down near present-day Ellensburg and got him to agree to put Allen's men under government contract. They would from that date forward be paid to build the road they had been constructing for two months as volunteers. Apparently satisfied that he had fulfilled his orders in regards to building a road over the mountains, McClellan continued his journey north, anticipating his upcoming rendezvous with Governor Stevens who was working his way west from Minnesota.

The James Longmire wagon train arrived at Fort Walla Walla in early September 1853, with plans to continue to Puget Sound. Persuaded to take the new "People's Road" over Naches Pass, they followed a route up the Naches and Little Naches Rivers to the mountains, leaving the prairies of eastern Washington behind and encountering northwest forests for the first time in mid-September. Here they followed Kirtley's blazes marking a trail, but no road. The wagon train cut a road as they went. Within five miles of the pass (east side) they picked up Allen's more substantial road and reached Naches Pass in early October.

After encountering difficulties such as running low on food supplies, having to lower the wagons down a steep incline with ropes, and fording the White River multiple times, the wagon train made its way down the western slopes of the Cascade Mountains. The emigrants broke out of the forest and into open prairie country at the site of present-day Enumclaw and arrived at Fort Steilacoom in mid-October. (Note: Information on the 1853 road and Longmire's wagon train from Dorpat and McCoy.)

The Mitchell wagon train crossed the pass only three weeks later followed by others in 1854, but the Naches Pass Wagon Road never became popular. In addition to the difficult descent from Naches Pass (eased in 1854), it also required 68 crossings of the Naches and Little Naches Rivers east of the pass and multiple crossings of the White River on the west side.

In 1854, Lieutenant Richard Arnold, stationed at Ft. Steilacoom, was officially tasked with overseeing the completion the road. He scouted it in May with Allen, then put Allen and his crew back under government contract to return in the summer of 1854 to improve and polish (or in Allen's word "sandpaper") their work. Among the emigrant parties using the road in the fall of 1854 were the wagon trains of Winfield Scott Ebey and Jacob Redding Meeker.

=== Modern use ===
In 1855, the outbreak of the Puget Sound Indian War and Yakima Indian War preoccupied settlers and left use of the wagon road to the Indians and army. In addition, in early 1855, Lieutenant Abiel Tinkham had already reported on the superiority of Snoqualmie Pass as a cross-mountain route. Following the Indian wars, the Naches Pass route was used almost exclusively by stockmen who drove their herds both ways over the pass on a regular basis until the turn of the century.

In the 1920s, Ezra Meeker lobbied mightily to get the state legislature to select the Naches Pass route for a southern cross-state highway. The deep dollars of the railroads and their plans to build a hotel on the north side of Mount Rainier National Park led to the creation of the Chinook Pass highway instead. A proposed road through the Naches Pass was added to the state highway system in 1943, and is still in state statutes as State Route 168, but the road has never been built. Today, the old wagon road is a very popular and nationally recognized jeep trail.
