= Deadwood =

Deadwood may refer to:

== Places ==
=== Canada ===
- Deadwood, Alberta
- Deadwood, British Columbia
- Deadwood River, a tributary of the Dease River in northern British Columbia

=== United States ===
- Deadwood, California (disambiguation), several communities
- Deadwood, Oregon
- Deadwood, South Dakota
- Deadwood, Texas
- Deadwood Draw, on the National Register of Historic Places in Cheyenne County, Nebraska

== Arts, entertainment, and media ==
- Dead Wood (2007), a British horror film
- Deadwood (game), a board game
- "Deadwood" (Dirty Pretty Things song), 2006
- "Deadwood" (Toni Braxton song), 2017
- "Deadwood", a song by Garbage, a B-side of the single "I Think I'm Paranoid"
- Deadwood (TV series), a 2004–2006 American western drama series on HBO
  - "Deadwood" (Deadwood episode), the first episode of the HBO television series
- Deadwood: The Movie (2019), a film continuation of the HBO television series
- An element of the game gin rummy

== Other uses ==
- Deadwood (shipbuilding), a shipbuilding term
- Deadwood Central Railroad, a narrow-gauge interurban railroad in South Dakota
- Deadwood Peak, a mountain in Washington state
- Deadwood Peak (California), a mountain in Alpine County

== See also ==
- Dead wood (disambiguation)
