= Deadwood Peak =

Mountain in Washington (state), United States

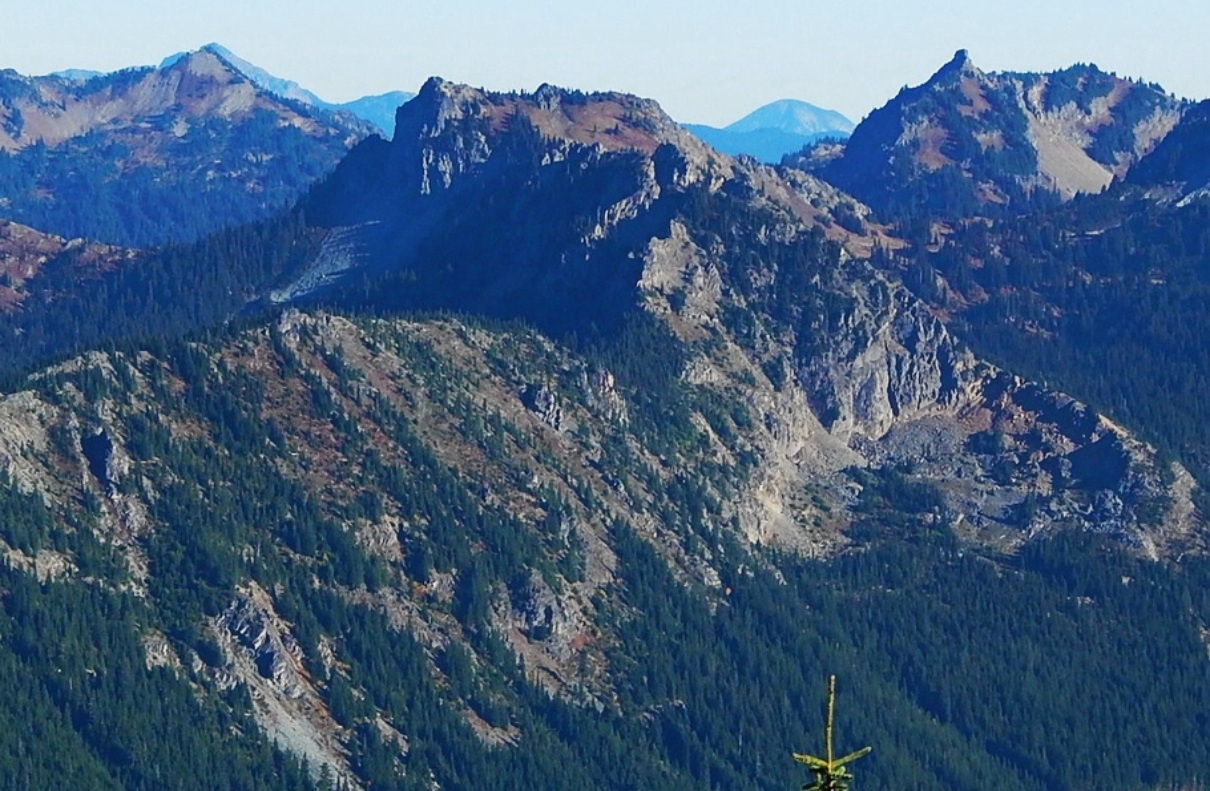
- Deadwood Peak from northwest at Sunrise Point

Highest point
- Elevation: 6,280 ft (1,914 m)
- Prominence: 600 ft (183 m)
- Parent peak: Naches Peak (6,452 ft)
- Isolation: 1.08 mi (1.74 km)
- Coordinates: 46°52′54″N 121°31′09″W

Geography
- Location within Washington (state) Location within the United States
- Country: United States
- State: Washington
- County: Pierce / Yakima
- Protected area: Mount Rainier National Park
- Parent range: Cascades
- Topo map: USGS White River Park

Climbing
- Easiest route: Scrambling class 3

Deadwood Peak is a 6,280-foot-elevation (1,910-meter) mountain summit located on the eastern border of Mount Rainier National Park. It is also situated on the shared border of Pierce County and Yakima County in Washington state. Deadwood Peak is set on the crest of the Cascade Range, immediately north of Yakima Peak and Chinook Pass, with the Pacific Crest Trail traversing its east slope. Its nearest higher peak is Naches Peak, 0.59 mi (0.95 km) to the southeast. Deadwood Peak takes its name from Deadwood Lakes and Deadwood Creek to its northwest, and their names came from the large number of downed trees in the area. From Chinook Pass, a short scramble up the south side leads to the summit with unobstructed views of Mount Rainier.

== Climate ==
Deadwood Peak is located in the marine west coast climate zone of western North America. Most weather fronts originating in the Pacific Ocean travel northeast toward the Cascade Mountains. As fronts approach, they are forced upward by the peaks of the Cascade Range (orographic lift), causing them to drop their moisture in the form of rain or snow onto the Cascades. As a result, the west side of the Cascades experiences high precipitation, especially during the winter months in the form of snowfall. Because of maritime influence, snow tends to be wet and heavy, resulting in high avalanche danger. During winter months, weather is usually cloudy, but due to high pressure systems over the Pacific Ocean that intensify during summer months, there is often little or no cloud cover during the summer. Precipitation runoff from Deadwood Peak drains west into tributaries of the White River, and east to Yakima River.

== Gallery ==
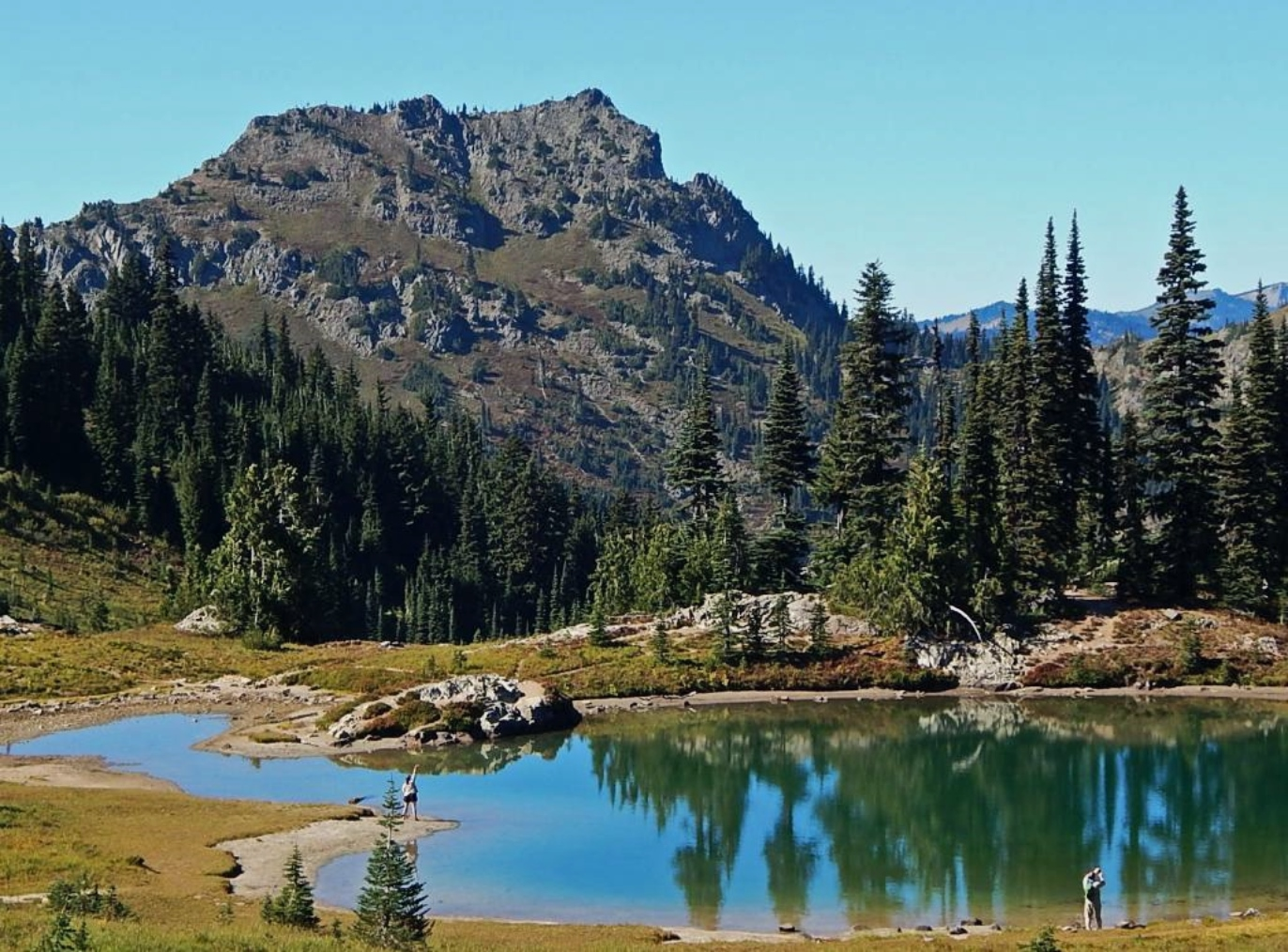
Deadwood Peak seen from PCT

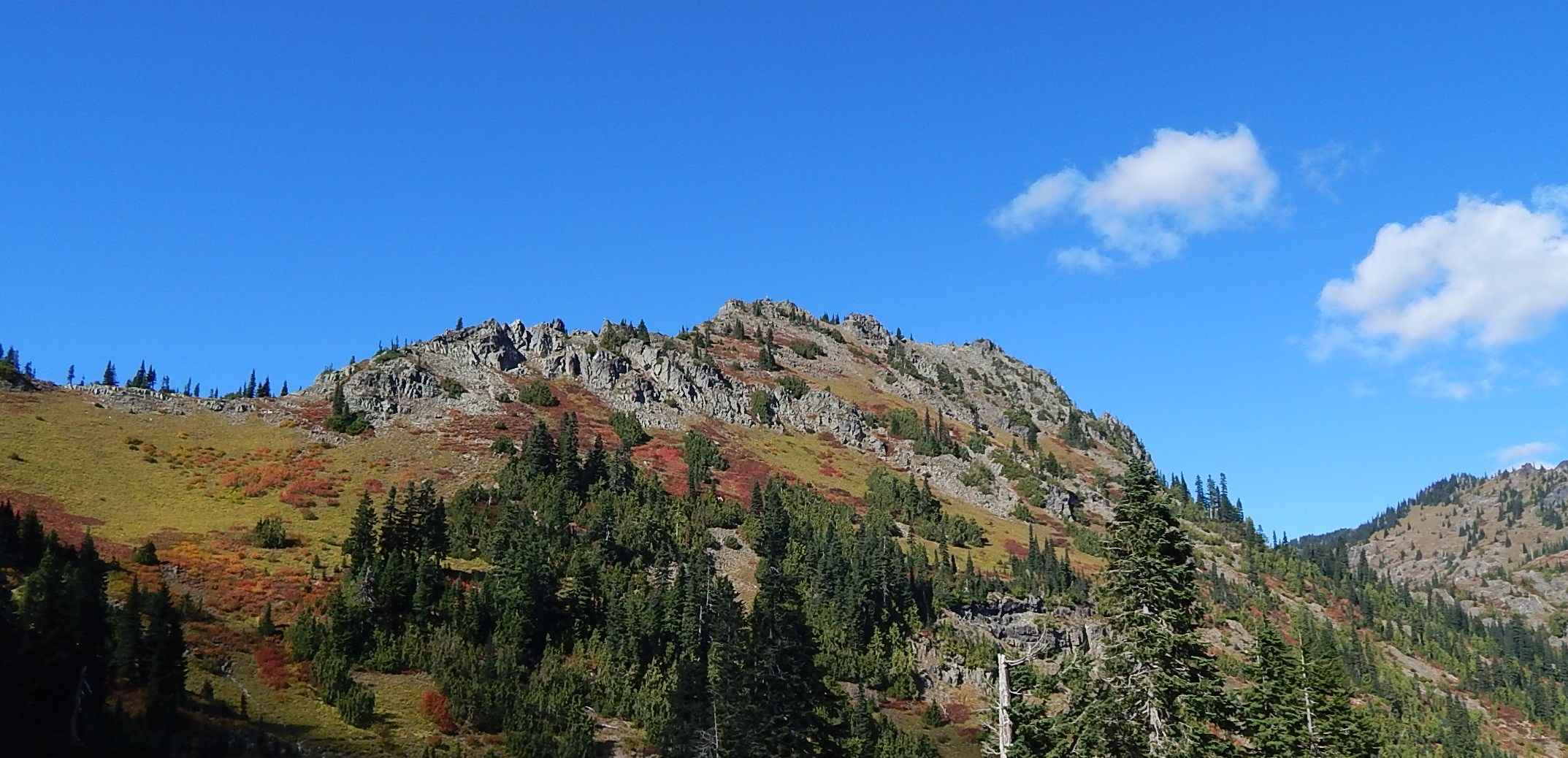
Deadwood Peak seen from Chinook Pass

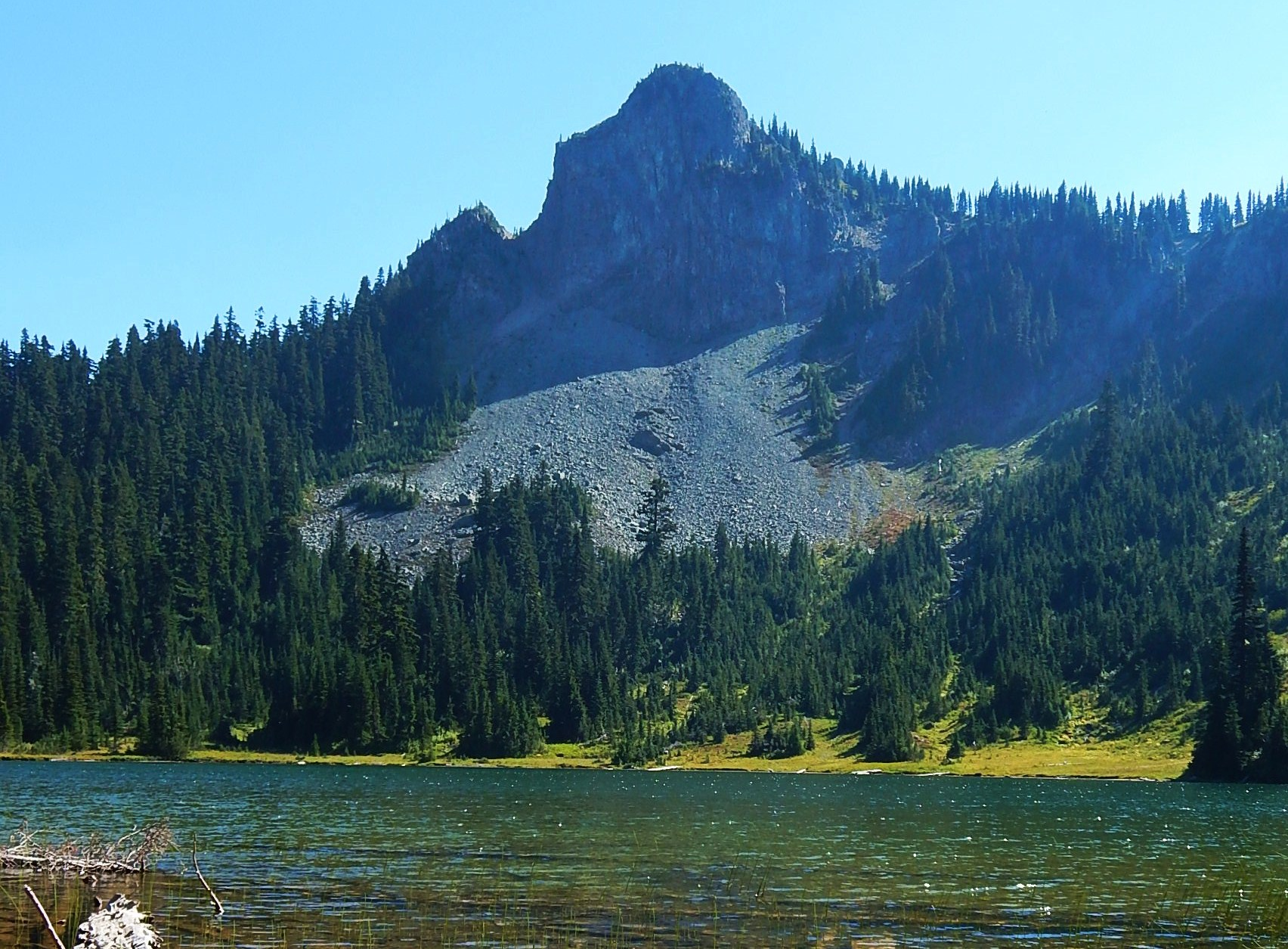
Deadwood Peak seen from Deadwood Lakes

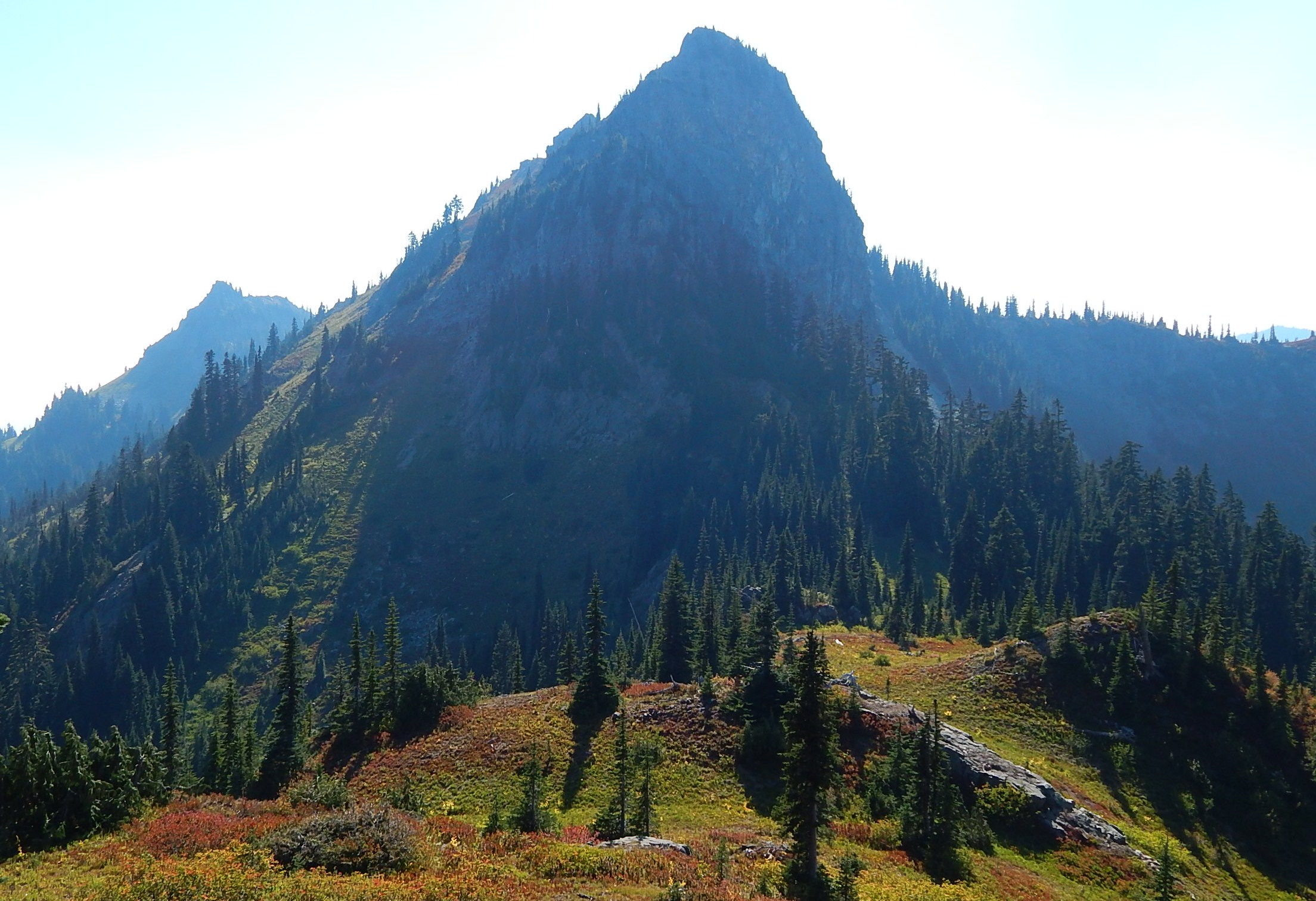
Deadwood Peak seen from north

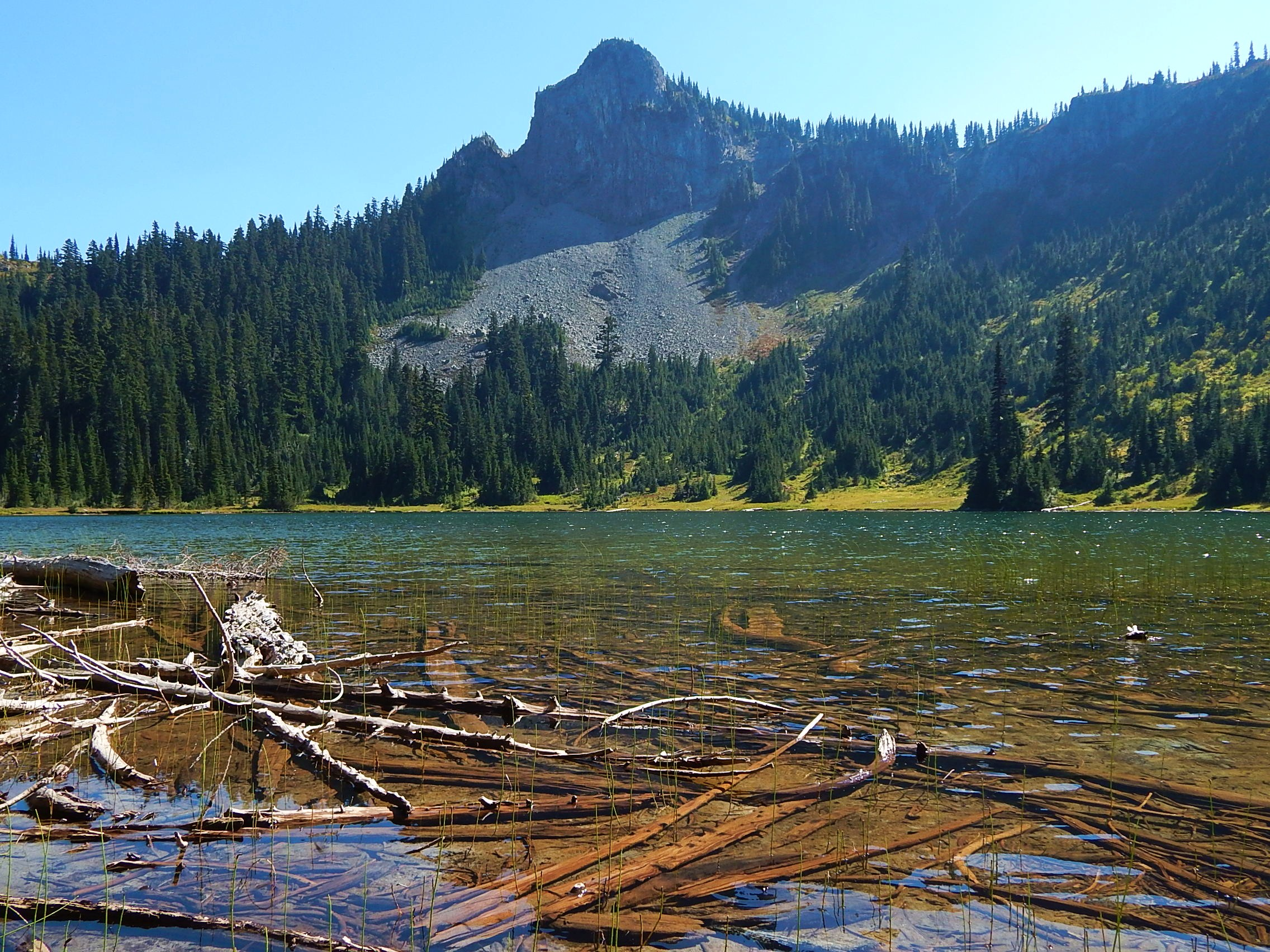
Deadwood Lake seen with Deadwood Peak

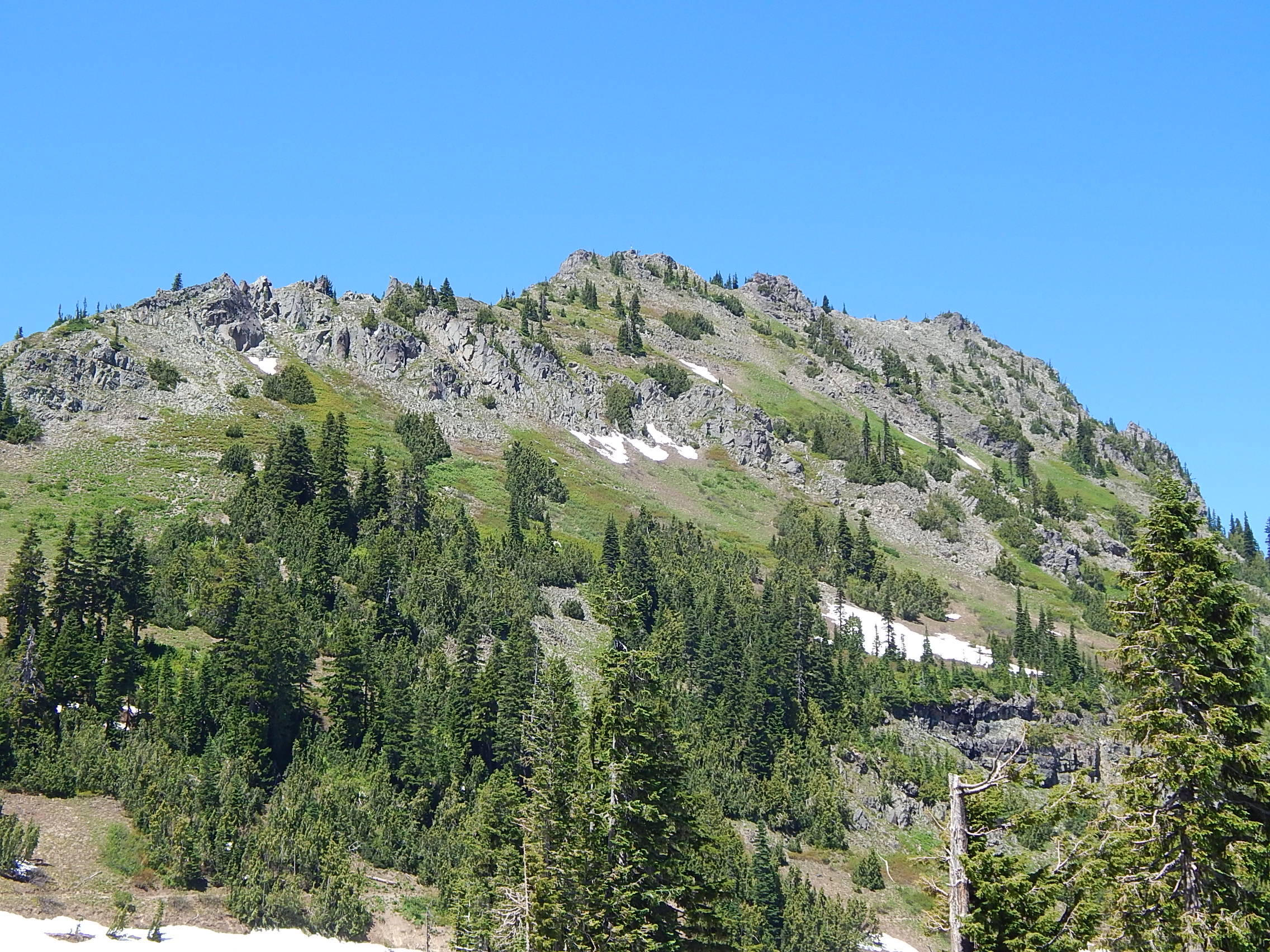
Deadwood Peak from Chinook Pass

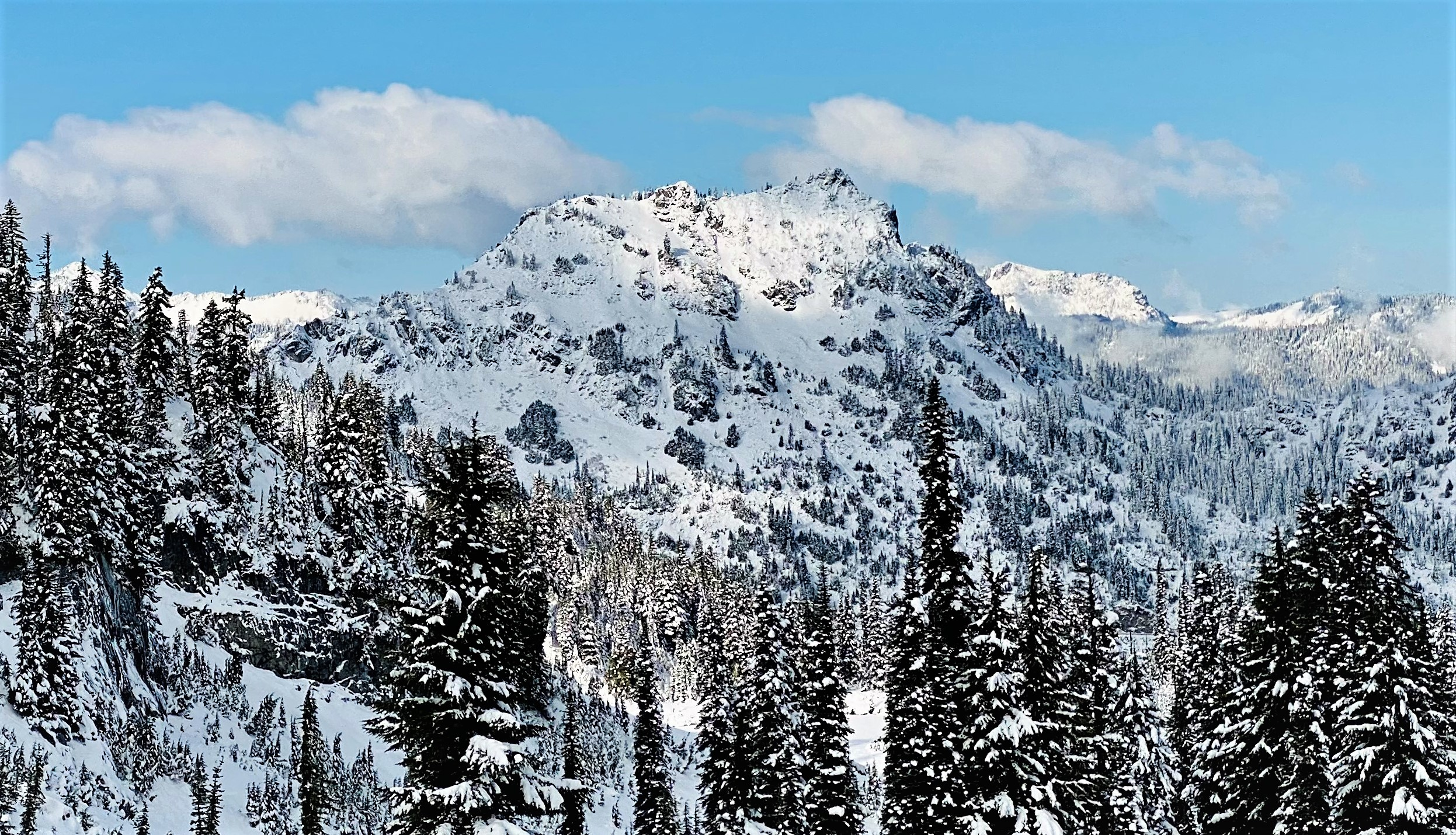
Deadwood Peak with autumn snow
