= Yakima Peak =

Mountain in Washington (state), United States

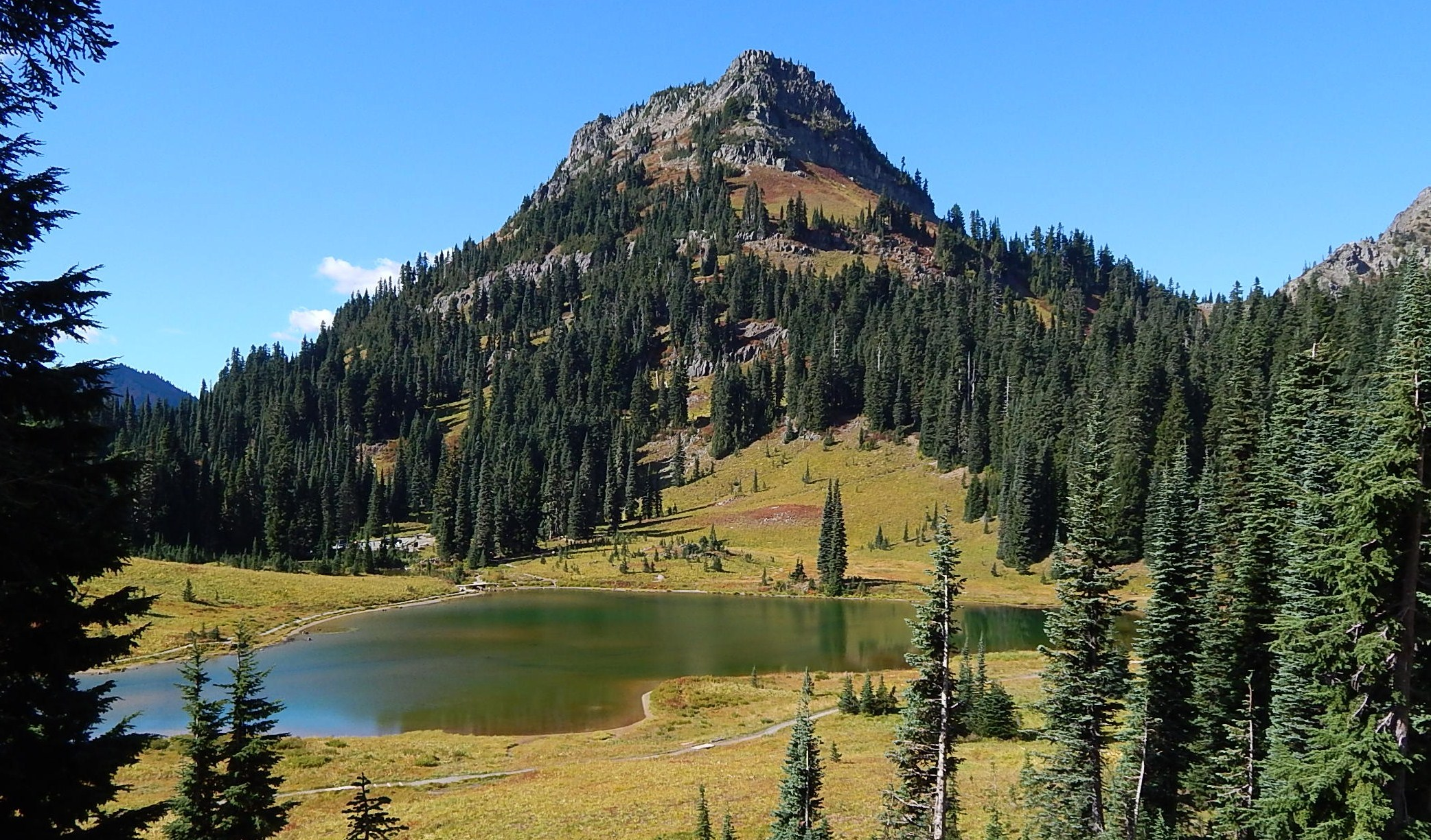
- Yakima Peak seen from Tipsoo Lake

Highest point
- Elevation: 6,226 ft (1,898 m)
- Prominence: 426 ft (130 m)
- Parent peak: Deadwood Peak (6,280 ft)
- Isolation: 0.57 mi (0.92 km)
- Coordinates: 46°52′24″N 121°31′22″W

Geography
- Location within Washington (state) Location within the United States
- Country: United States
- State: Washington
- County: Pierce / Yakima
- Protected area: Mount Rainier National Park
- Parent range: Cascades
- Topo map: USGS Chinook Pass

Climbing
- Easiest route: Scrambling class 3 north gully

Yakima Peak is a 6,226-ft (1,898 m) summit located on the eastern border of Mount Rainier National Park. It is also on the shared border of Pierce County and Yakima County in Washington state. Yakima Peak is situated northwest of Tipsoo Lake and west of Chinook Pass on the crest of the Cascade Range. Yakima Peak is a major triple divide point with precipitation runoff draining into tributaries of the White River, Cowlitz River, and Yakima River. Its nearest higher neighbor is Deadwood Peak, 0.59 mi (0.95 km) to the north. The name Yakima Peak honors the Yakima Tribe of eastern Washington state. From Chinook Pass, a short scramble up a gully on the north side leads to a flat summit with unobstructed views of Mount Rainier and Naches Peak.

== Climate ==
Yakima Peak is located in the marine west coast climate zone of western North America. Most weather fronts originating in the Pacific Ocean travel northeast toward the Cascade Mountains. As fronts approach, they are forced upward by the peaks of the Cascade Range (orographic lift), causing them to drop their moisture in the form of rain or snow onto the Cascades. As a result, the west side of the Cascades experiences high precipitation, especially during the winter months in the form of snowfall. Because of maritime influence, snow tends to be wet and heavy, resulting in high avalanche danger. During winter months, weather is usually cloudy, but due to high pressure systems over the Pacific Ocean that intensify during summer months, there is often little or no cloud cover during the summer.

== See also ==
- Geography of Washington (state)
