= American River Ski Bowl =

American River Ski Bowl was an alpine ski area that operated in Washington state between 1935 and 1959.

Located 19 miles east of Chinook Pass, the ski area had a base elevation of 3,100 ft and a peak elevation of 3,600 ft above sea level serviced by two rope tows.
