= Tahtlum Peak =

Mountain in Washington (state), United States

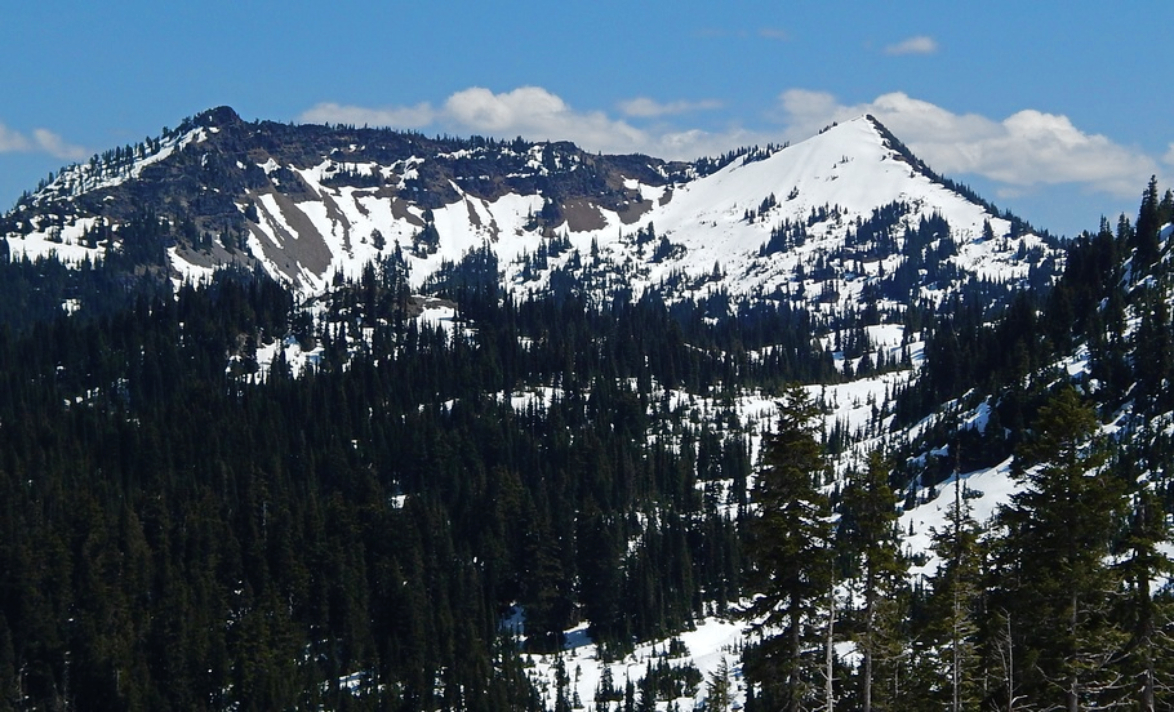
- Tahtlum Peak seen from Highway 410

Highest point
- Elevation: 6,567 ft (2,002 m)
- Prominence: 1,135 ft (346 m)
- Parent peak: Chinook Peak
- Isolation: 1.6 mi (2.6 km)
- Coordinates: 46°51′52″N 121°28′39″W

Geography
- Location within Washington (state) Location within the United States
- Country: United States
- State: Washington
- County: Yakima
- Protected area: William O. Douglas Wilderness
- Parent range: Cascades
- Topo map: USGS Cougar Lake

Climbing
- Easiest route: Hiking class 2

Tahtlum Peak is a 6,567-foot-elevation (2,002-meter) mountain summit in Yakima County of Washington state.

== Description ==
Tahtlum Peak is located east-southeast of Chinook Pass and north of Dewey Lake in the William O. Douglas Wilderness. It is part of the Cascade Range and the nearest higher neighbor is Dewey Peak, 1.61 mi (2.59 km) to the south. Precipitation runoff from Tahtlum Peak drains into the American River. Topographic relief is significant as the summit rises 1,455 feet (443 m) above Dewey Lake in less than one-half mile (0.80 km) and 2,800 feet (850 m) above American River in 1.5 miles (2.4 km). The name tahtlum derives from Chinook Jargon which means "ten." The mountain's toponym has not been officially adopted by the U.S. Board on Geographic Names, and it will remain unofficial as long as the USGS policy of not adopting new toponyms in designated wilderness areas remains in effect.

== Climate ==
Most weather fronts originate in the Pacific Ocean, and travel east toward the Cascade Mountains. As fronts approach, they are forced upward by the peaks of the Cascade Range (orographic lift), causing them to drop their moisture in the form of rain or snowfall onto the Cascades. As a result, the west side of the North Cascades experiences high precipitation, especially during the winter months in the form of snowfall. During winter months, weather is usually cloudy, but due to high pressure systems over the Pacific Ocean that intensify during summer months, there is often little or no cloud cover during the summer.

== Gallery ==
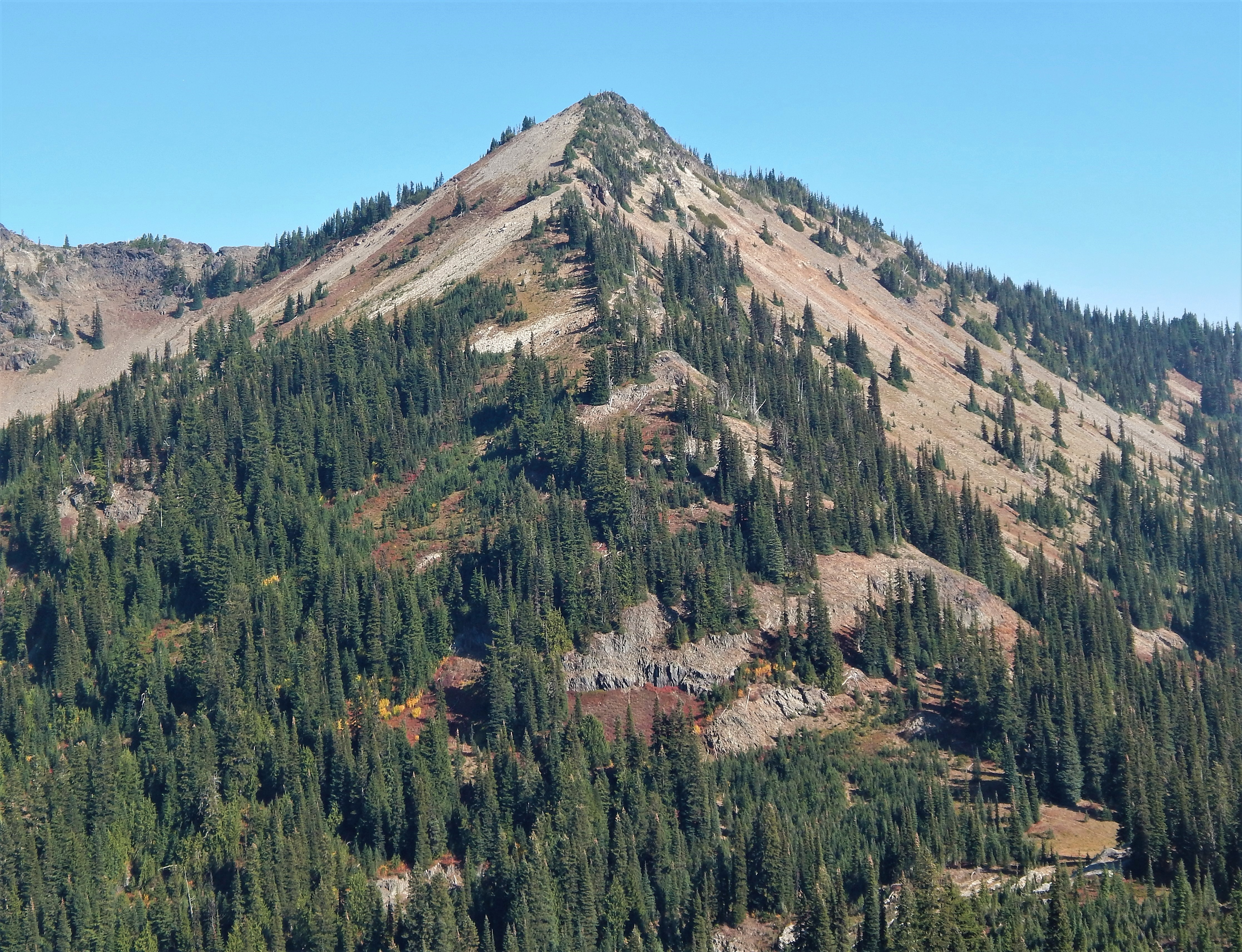
West aspect

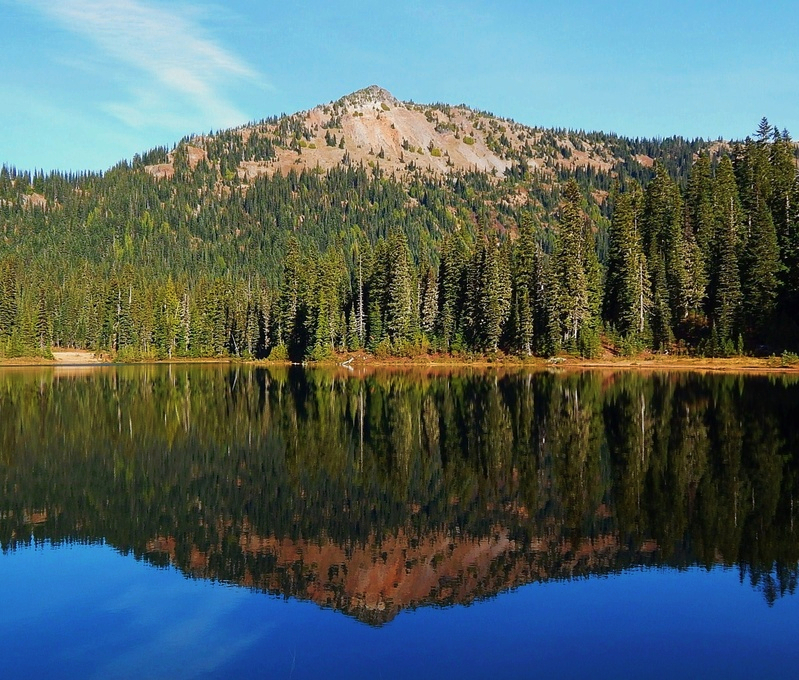
Tahtlum Peak reflected in Dewey Lake

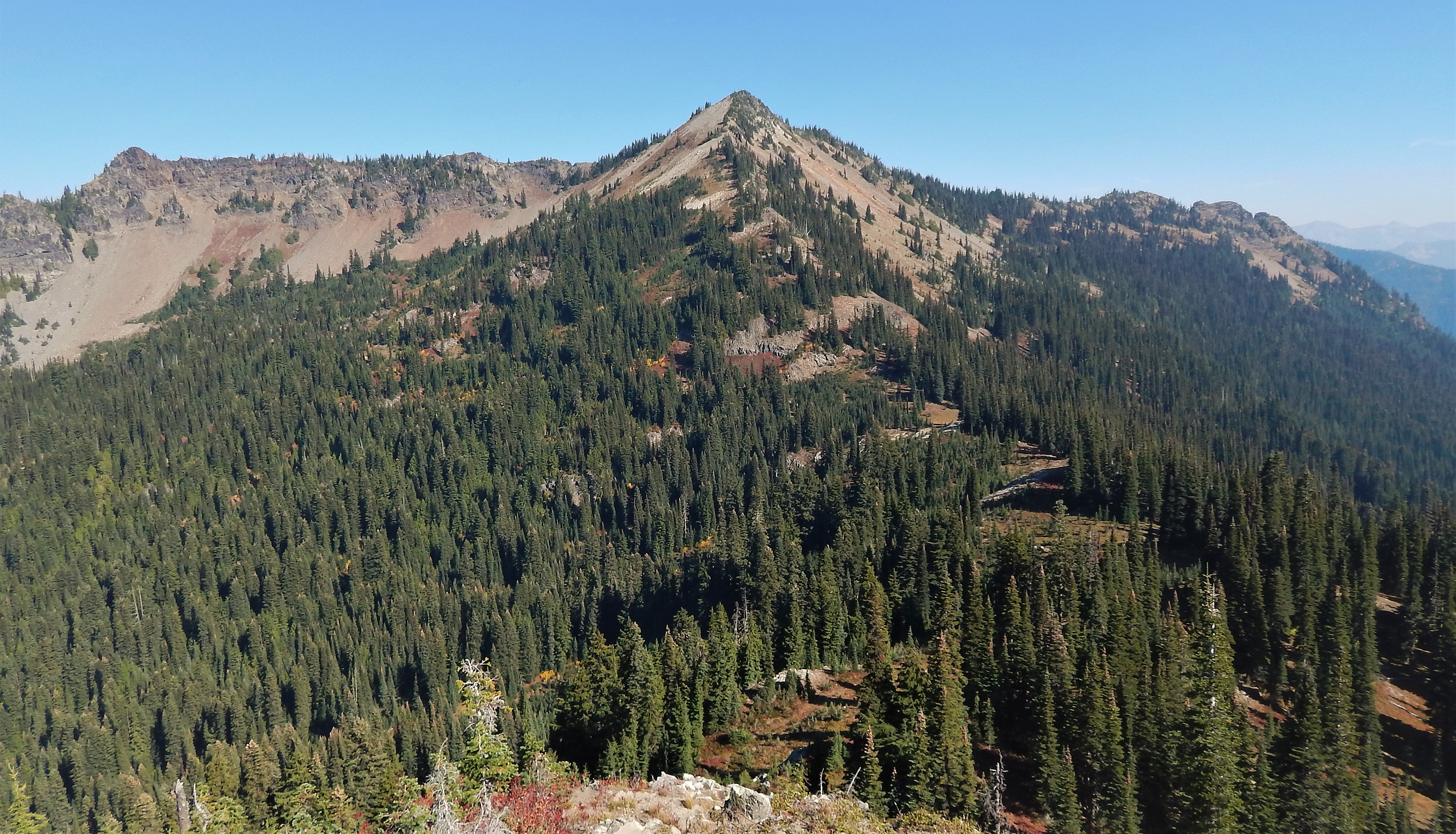

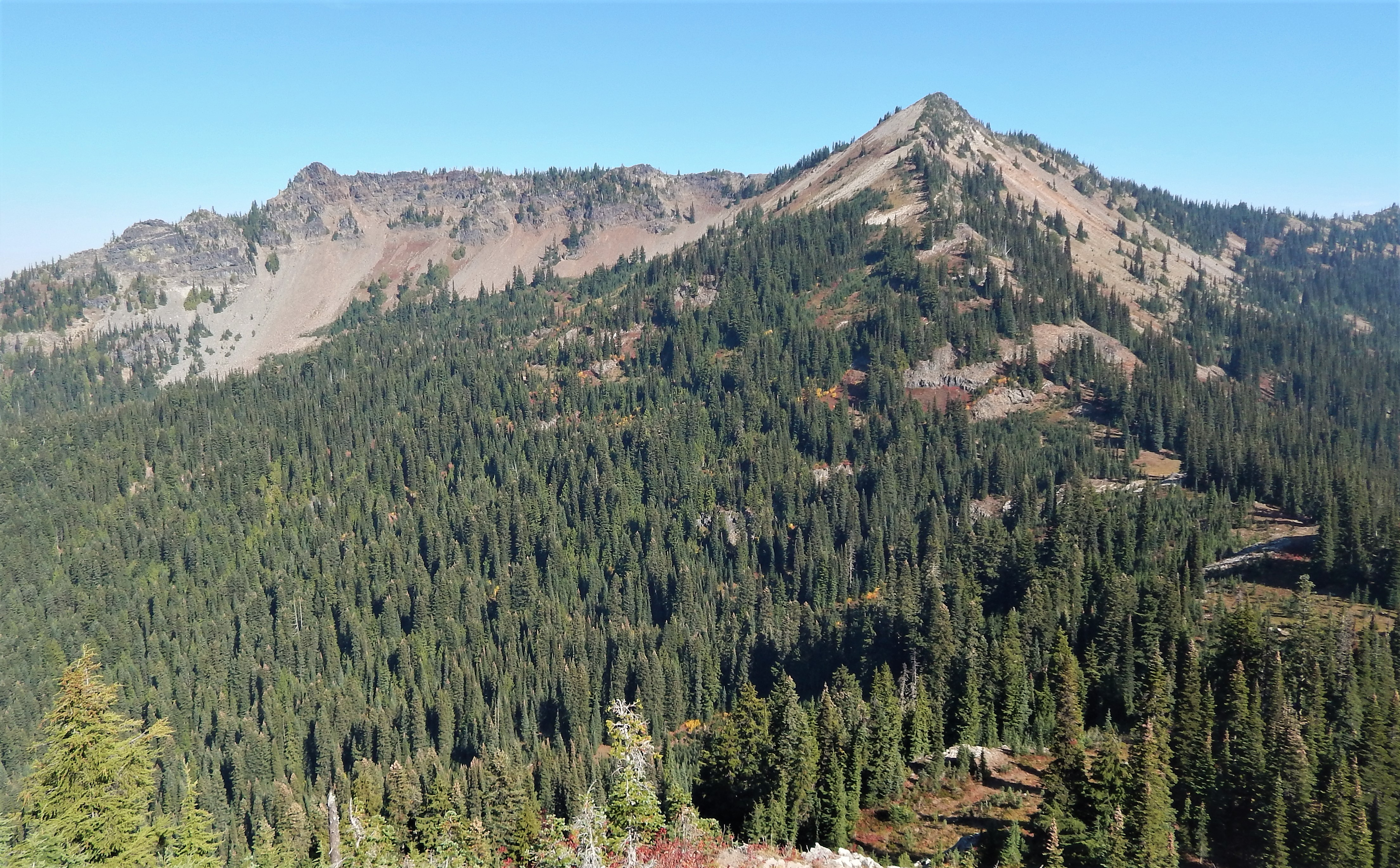

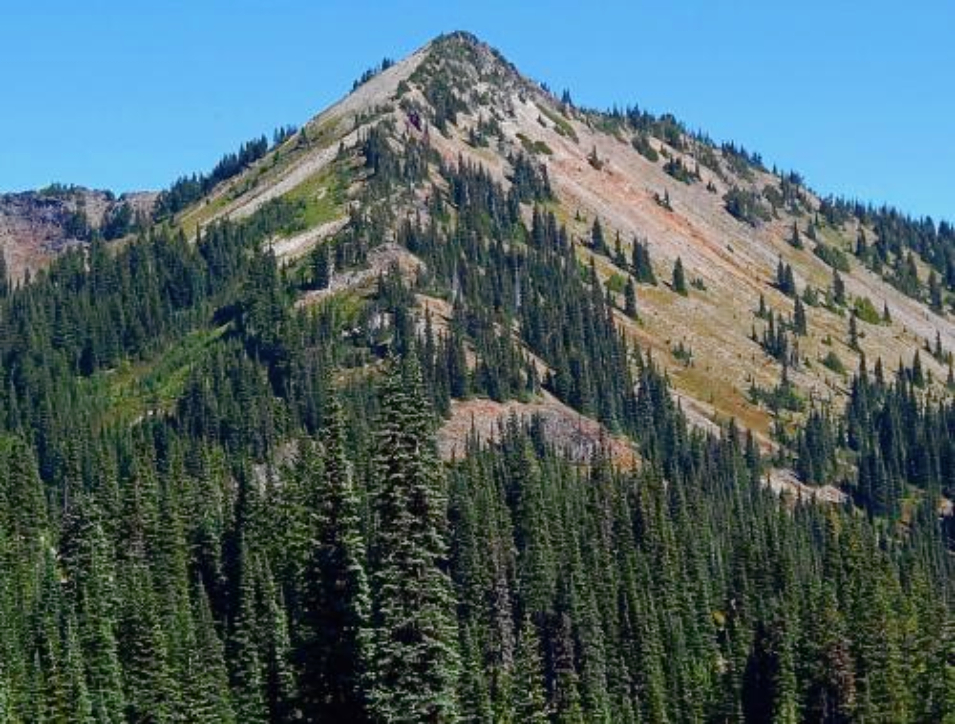
Approaching Tahtlum Peak from west
