= Dead wood =

Dead wood may refer to:

- Dead tree (disambiguation)
- Dead wood, the "straight man" in a double act
- Dead Wood (novel), a 2009 novel by Chris Longmuir
- Dead Wood (film), a 2007 British film

== See also ==
- Deadwood (disambiguation)
- Wood-decay fungus
