= Tipsoo Lake =

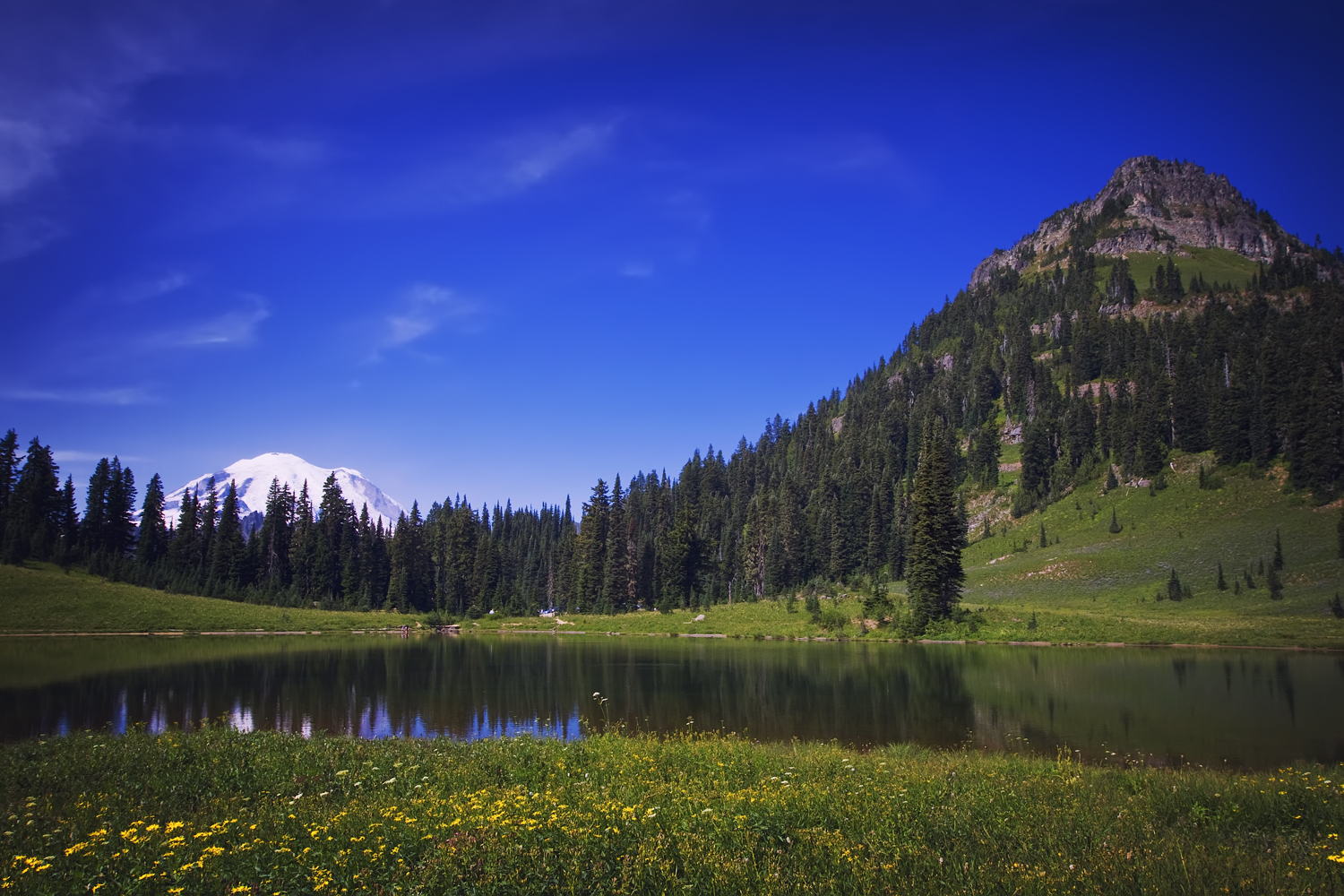

- Location within Washington (state) Location within the United States
- Location: Pierce County, Washington
- Coordinates: 46.8691°N 121.5173°W
- Type: alpine lake
- Surface elevation: 5,298 feet (1,615 m)

Tipsoo Lake, at an elevation of 5,298 feet (1,615 m) above sea level, is an alpine lake within the Northern Cascade Range near the summit of Chinook Pass in Pierce County, Washington.

The area is popular with photographers as the shores and surrounding area abound with the vibrant yellow, orange and purple colors of huckleberry, lupine, Indian paintbrush, and Partridgefoot. There are several hiking trails near the lake that vary in degrees of difficulty and that have views of Mount Rainier, Yakima Peak, and the surrounding landscape.

== Gallery ==
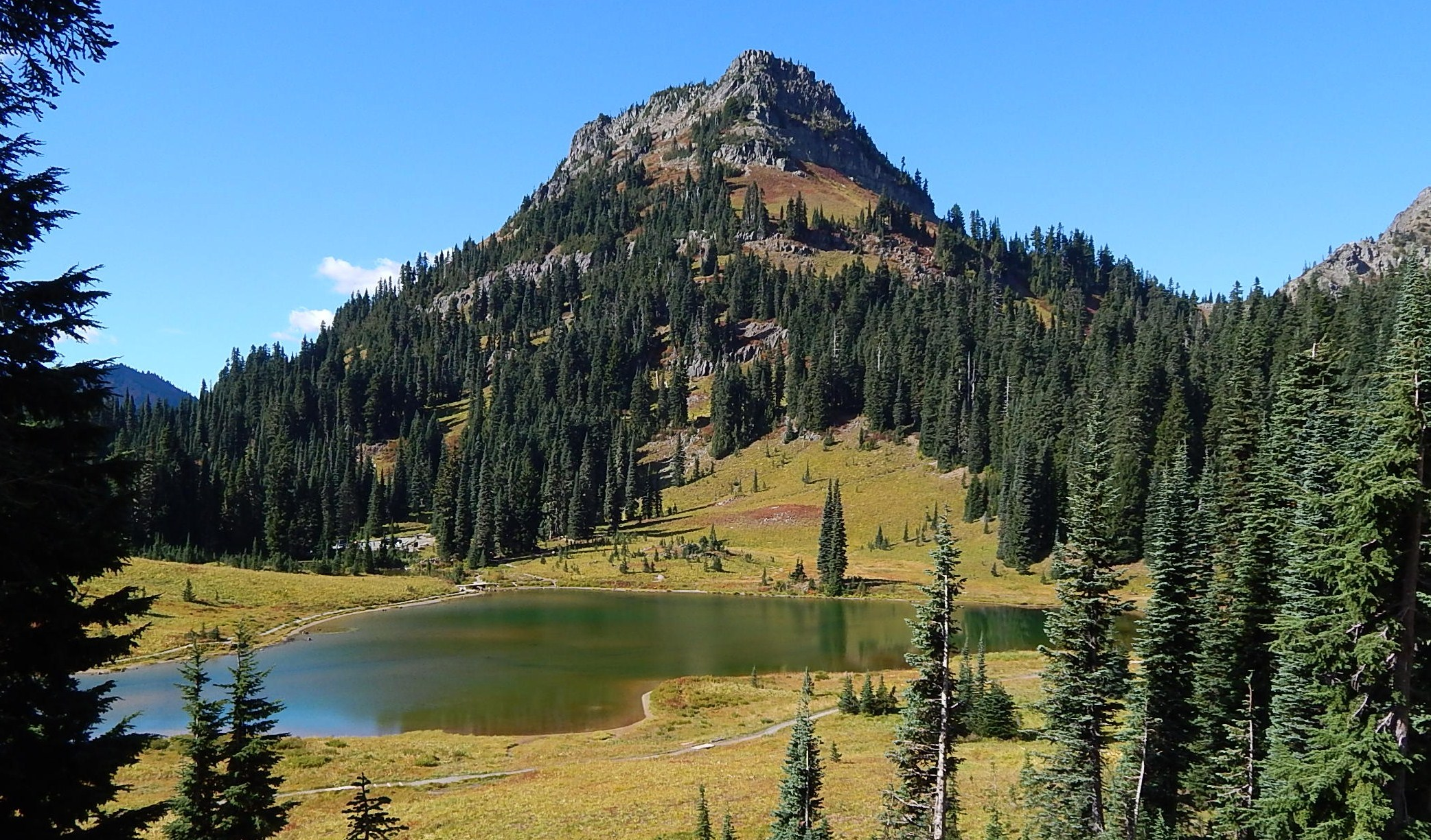
Yakima Peak and Tipsoo Lake

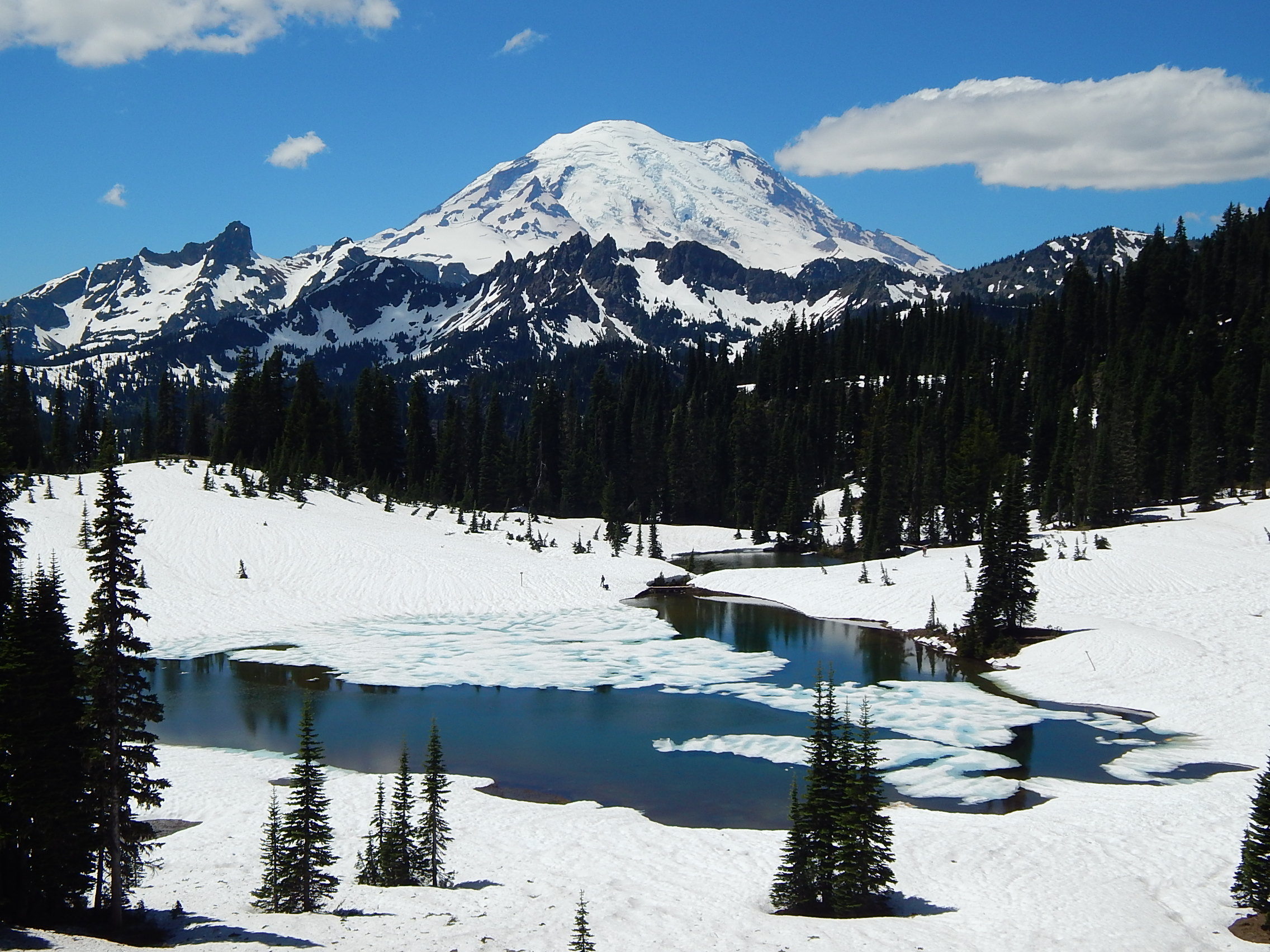
Tipsoo Lake overlook at Mount Rainier

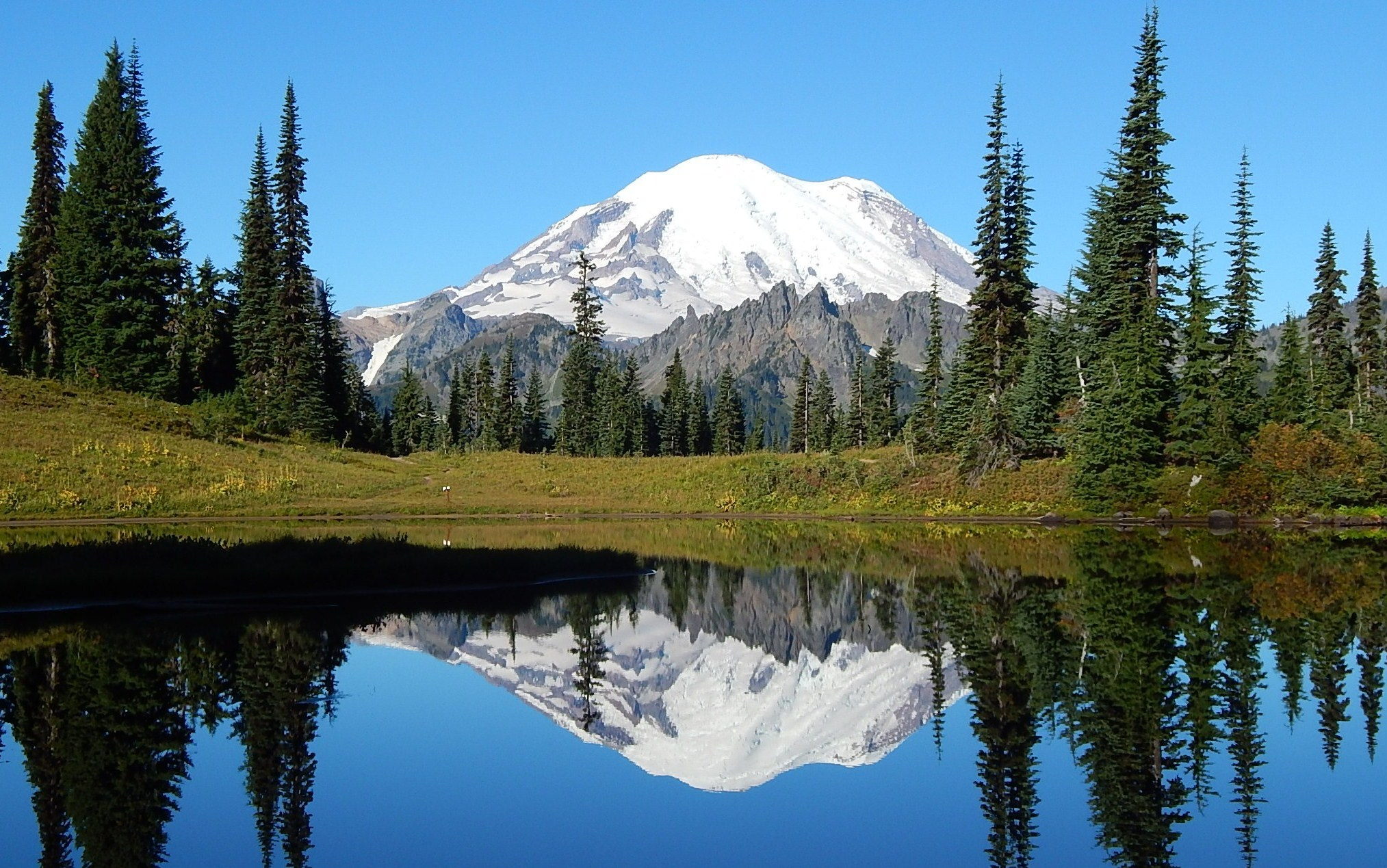
Upper Tipsoo Lake reflection

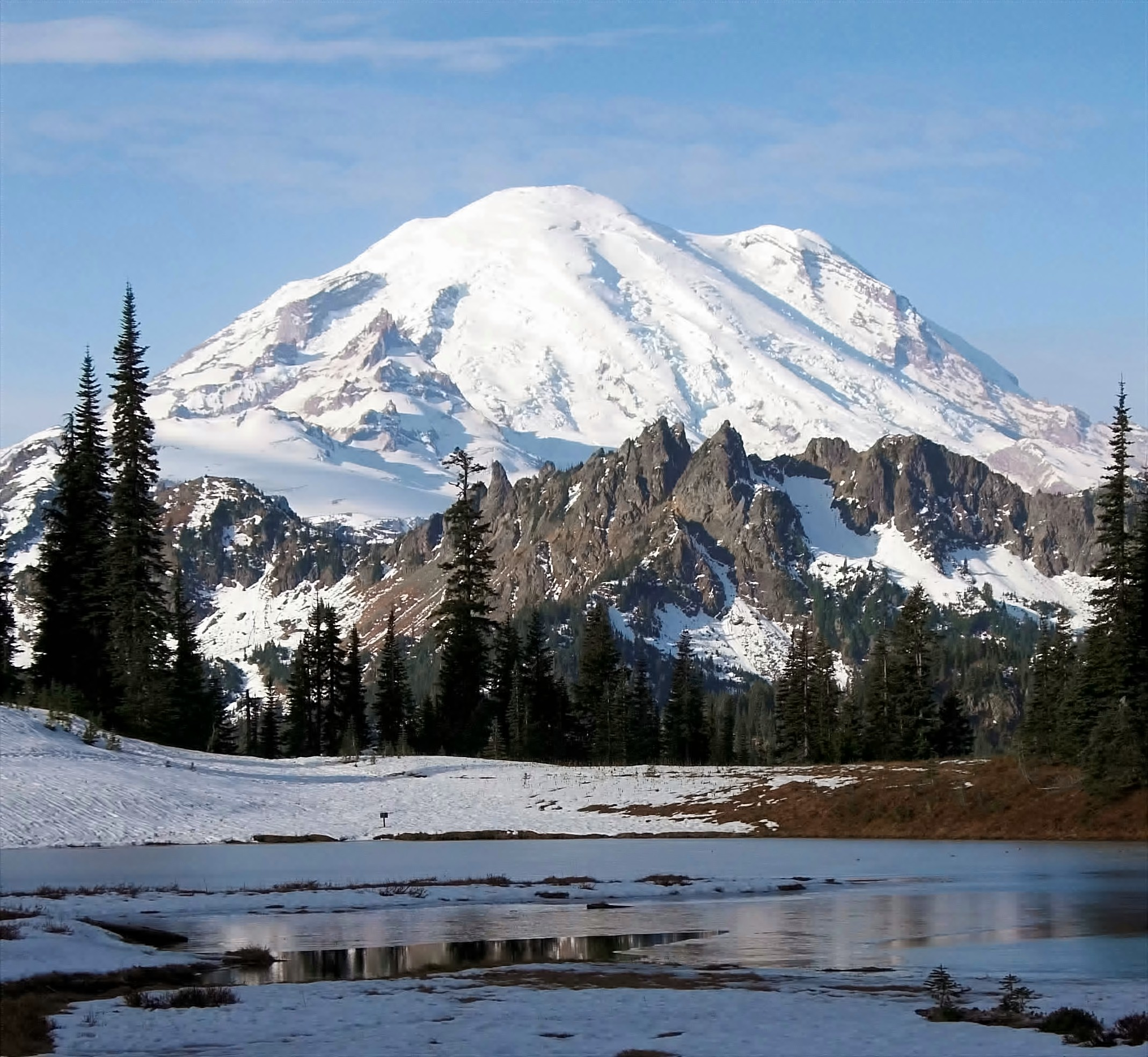
Rainier and Upper Tipsoo Lake

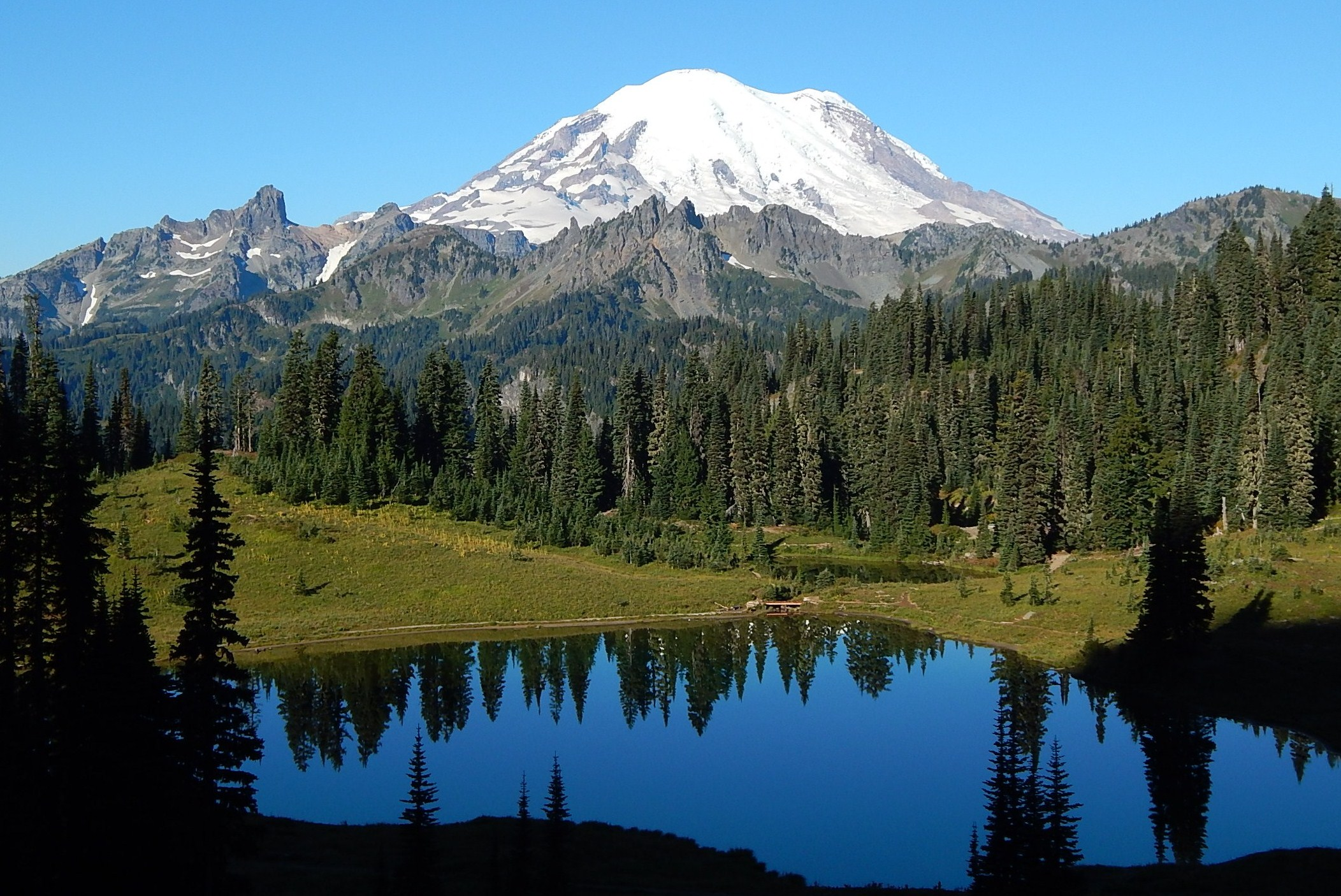
Mount Rainier from Tipsoo Lake overlook
