= Dead tree =

Dead tree may refer to:

- Dead Trees, an album by From First to Last
- Coarse woody debris, fallen dead trees and the remains of large branches on the ground in forests
- Large woody debris, logs, branches, and other wood that falls into streams and rivers
- Snag (ecology), a standing, partly or completely dead tree; also trees, branches, leaves and other pieces of naturally occurring wood found in a sunken form in rivers and streams
- Hard copy, the print version of an online document (humorously)

== See also ==
- Dead wood (disambiguation)
