= Naches Peak =

Mountain in Washington (state), United States

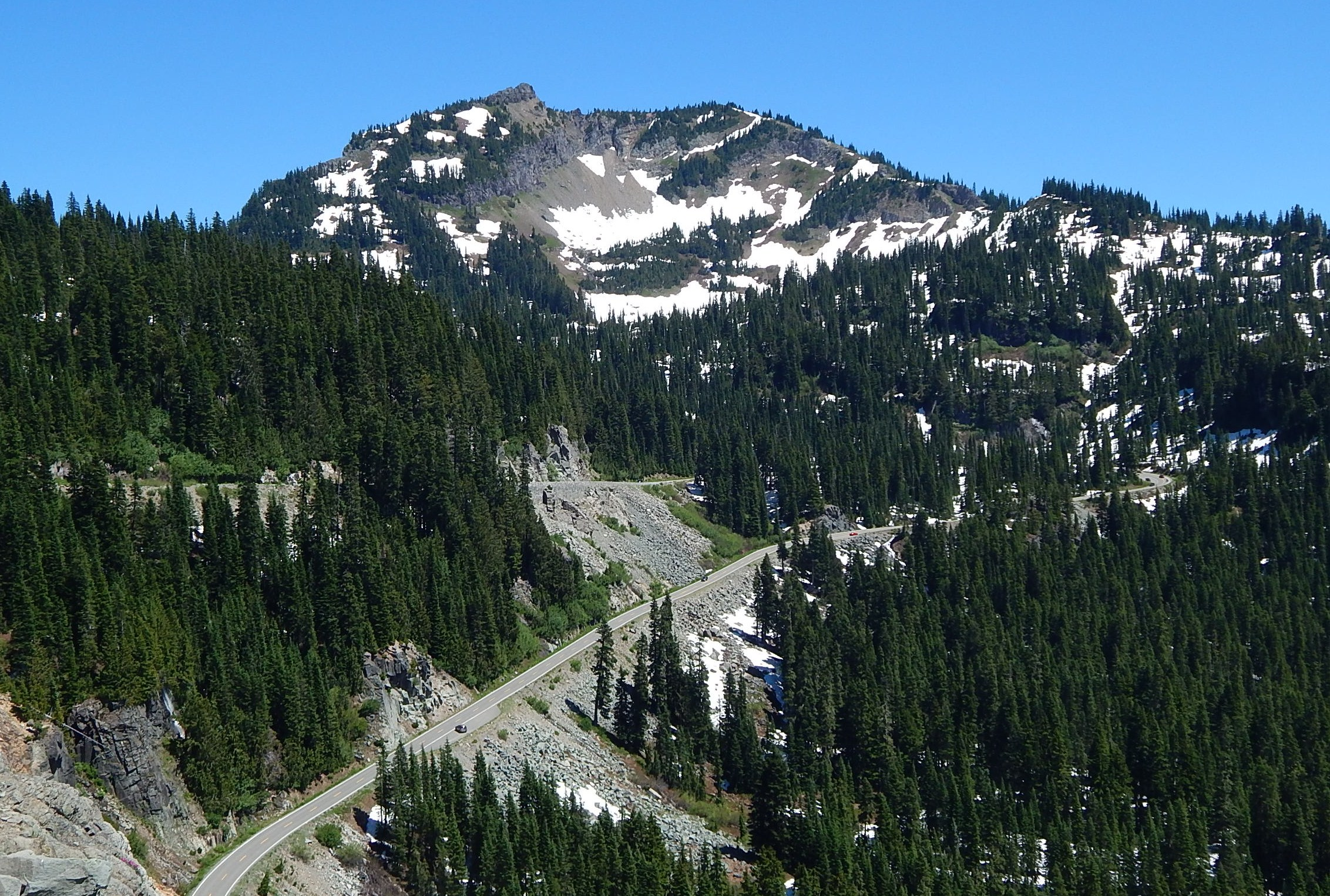
- Naches Peak seen from Highway 410

Highest point
- Elevation: 6,452 ft (1,967 m)
- Prominence: 692 ft (211 m)
- Parent peak: Tahtlum Peak (6,567 ft)
- Isolation: 1.45 mi (2.33 km)
- Coordinates: 46°52′04″N 121°30′28″W

Geography
- Location within Washington (state) Location within the United States
- Country: United States
- State: Washington
- County: Pierce / Yakima
- Protected area: Mount Rainier National Park; William O. Douglas Wilderness
- Parent range: Cascades
- Topo map: USGS Chinook Pass

Climbing
- Easiest route: Scrambling class 4

Naches Peak is a 6,452-foot (1,967 m) mountain summit located on the shared border of Mount Rainier National Park and William O. Douglas Wilderness. It is also on the shared border of Pierce County and Yakima County in Washington state. Naches Peak is situated on the crest of the Cascade Range and immediately southeast of Chinook Pass. Its nearest higher neighbor is Tahtlum Peak, 1.45 mi (2.33 km) to the east. The name Naches Peak was proposed by the Yakima Chamber of Commerce and approved by Asahel Curtis in 1927. The Naches Peak Loop Trail is a popular 3.5 mile trail encircling the peak. Naches Peak Loop joins a section of the Pacific Crest Trail and crosses meadows that fill with summer wildflowers. Precipitation runoff from the west side of Naches Peak drains into Chinook Creek, which is a tributary of the Ohanapecosh River, whereas the east side drains into tributaries of the American River.

== Climate ==
Naches Peak is located in the marine west coast climate zone of western North America. Most weather fronts originating in the Pacific Ocean travel northeast toward the Cascade Mountains. As fronts approach, they are forced upward by the peaks of the Cascade Range (orographic lift), causing them to drop their moisture in the form of rain or snow onto the Cascades. As a result, the west side of the Cascades experiences high precipitation, especially during the winter months in the form of snowfall. Because of maritime influence, snow tends to be wet and heavy, resulting in high avalanche danger. During winter months, weather is usually cloudy, but due to high pressure systems over the Pacific Ocean that intensify during summer months, there is often little or no cloud cover during the summer. The months of July through September offer the most favorable weather for viewing or climbing this peak.

== See also ==
- Geography of Washington (state)

== Gallery ==
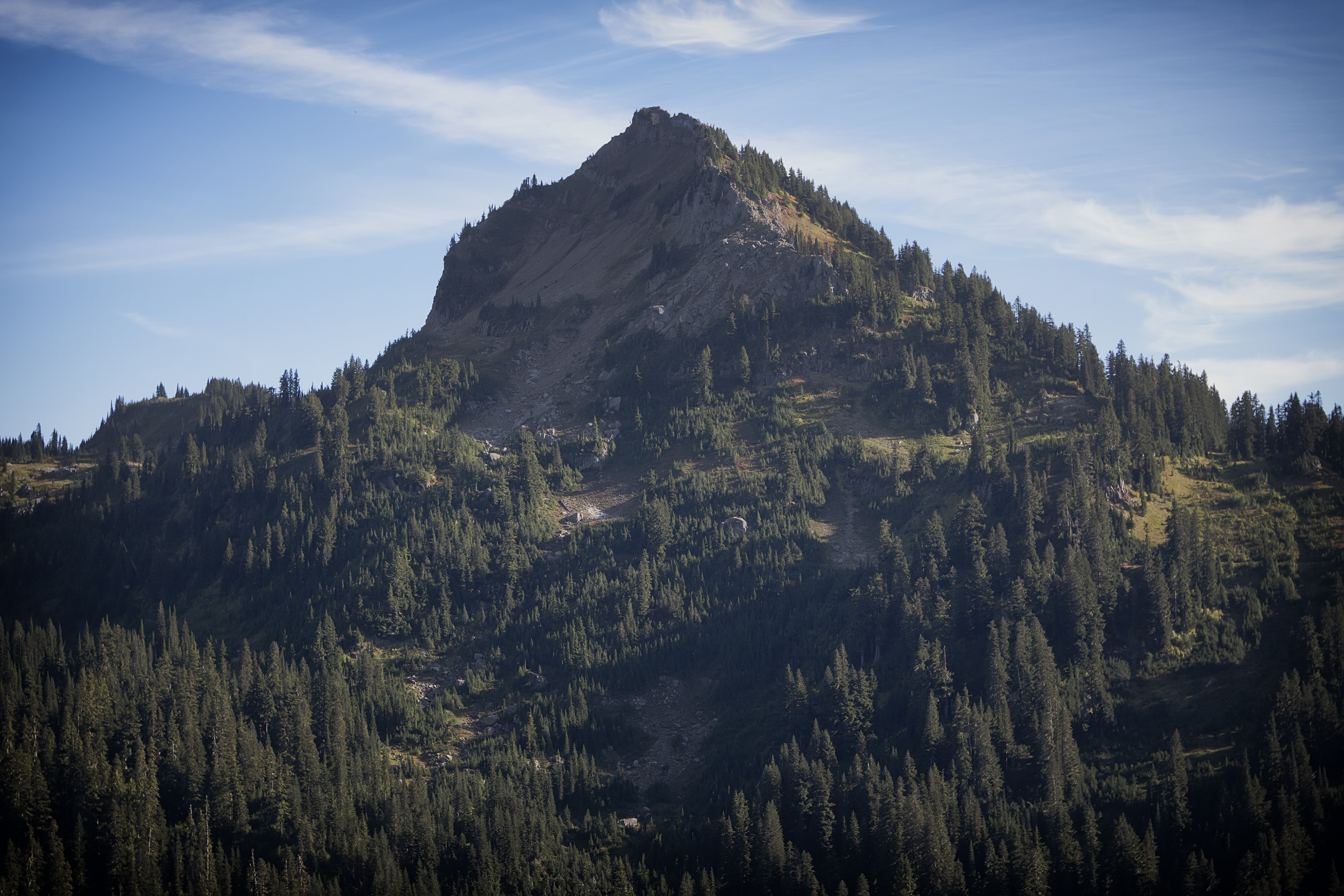
Naches Peak from north

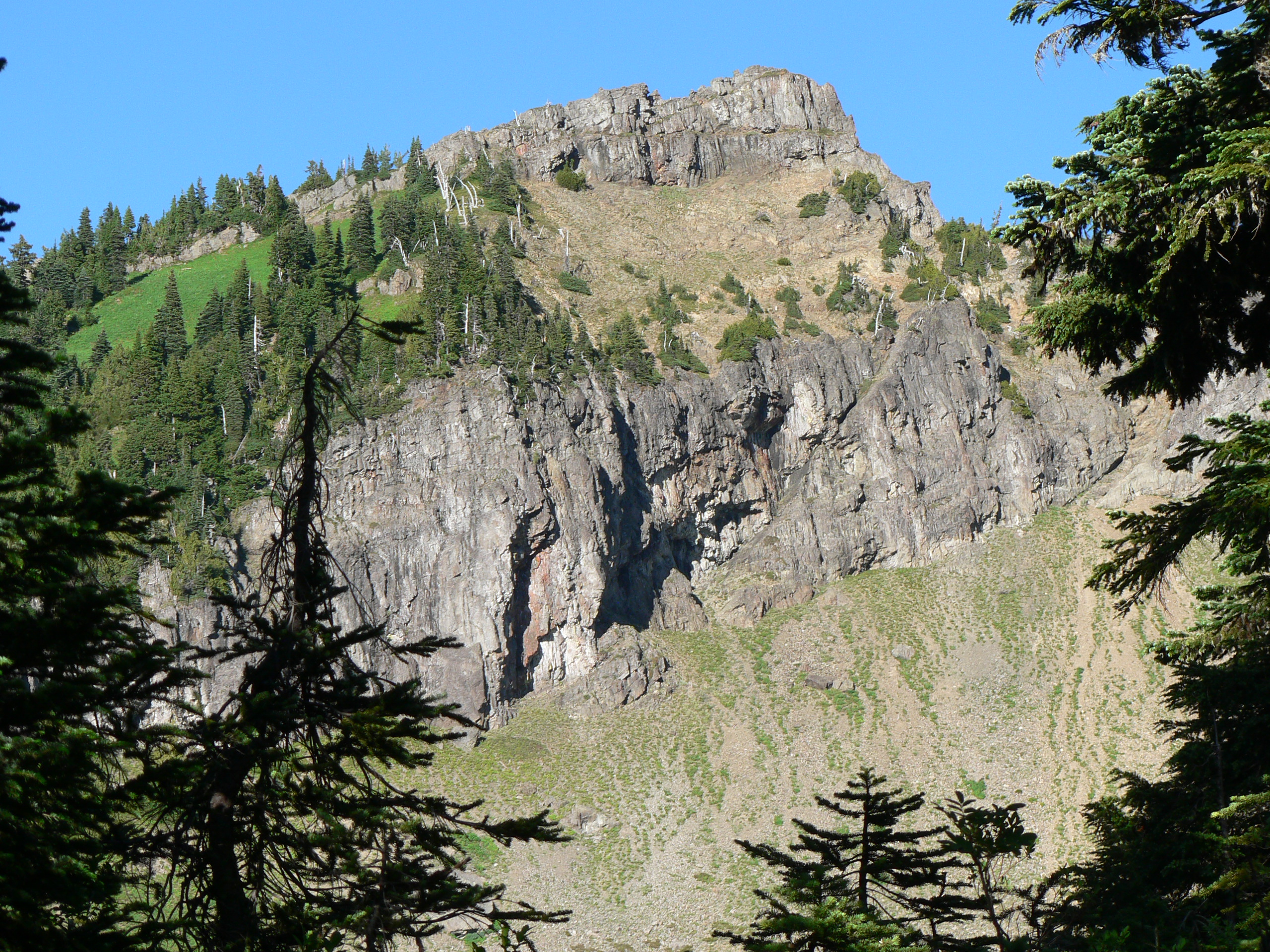
West aspect

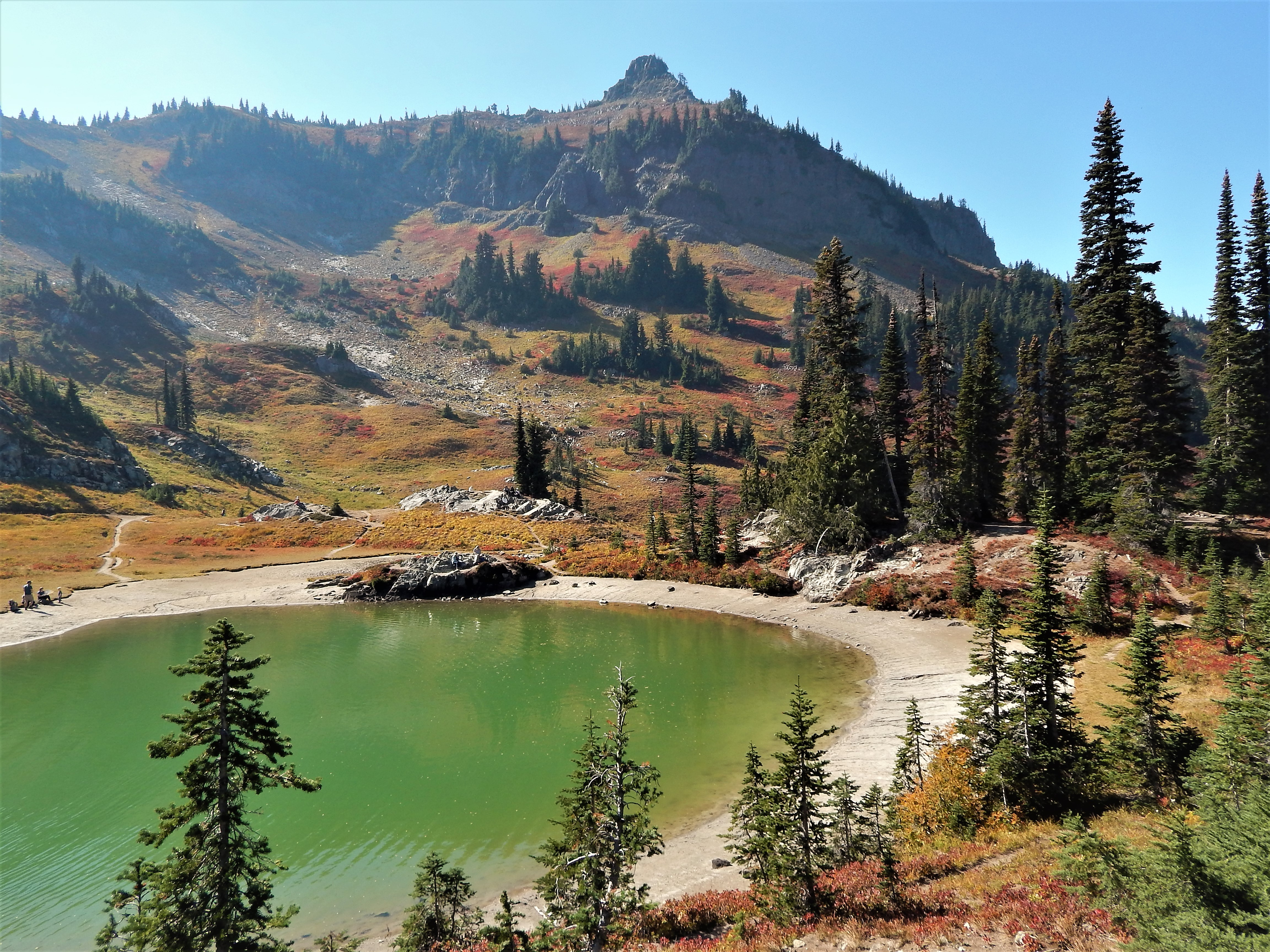
East aspect

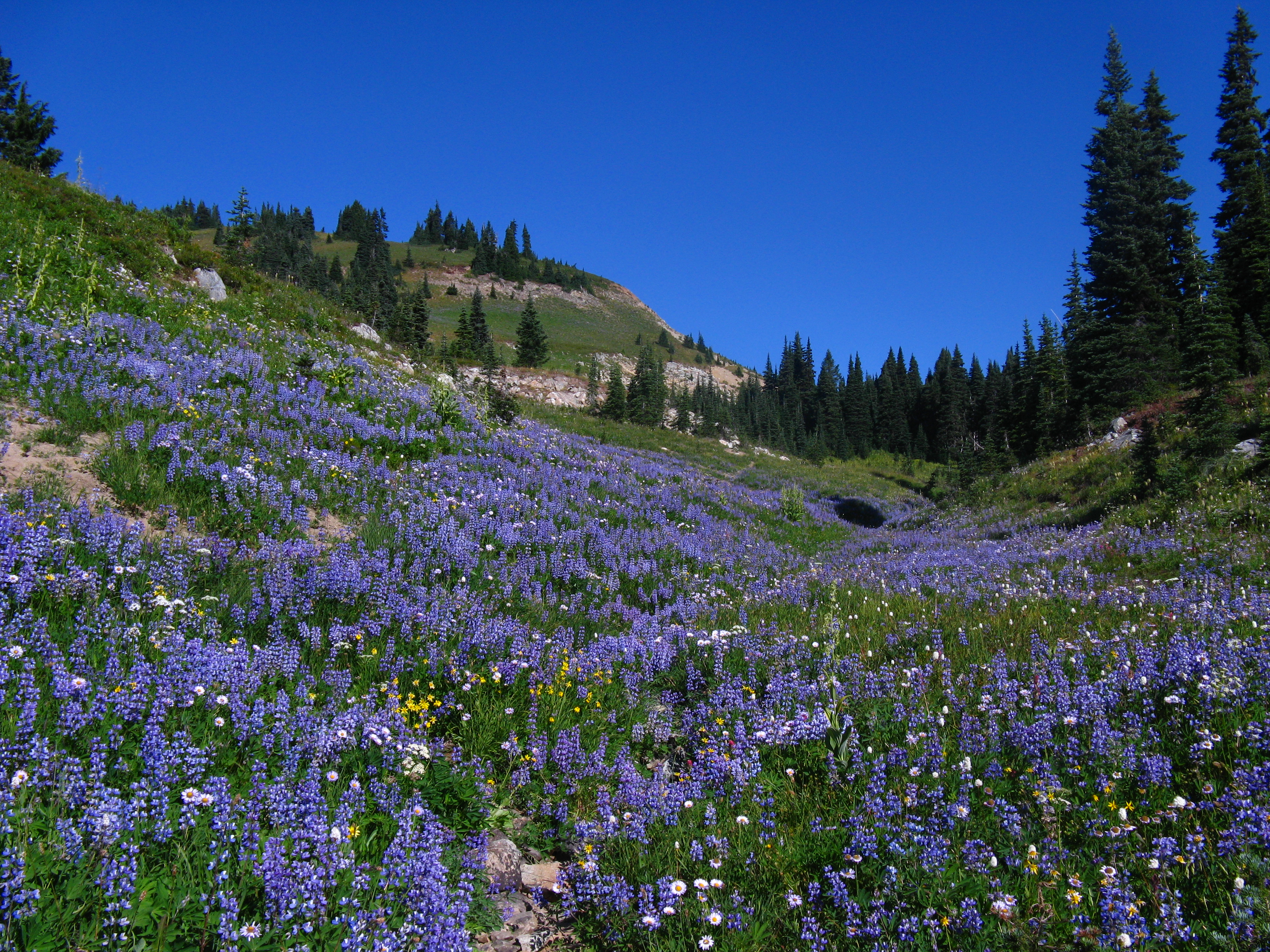
Lupine wildflowers along loop trail

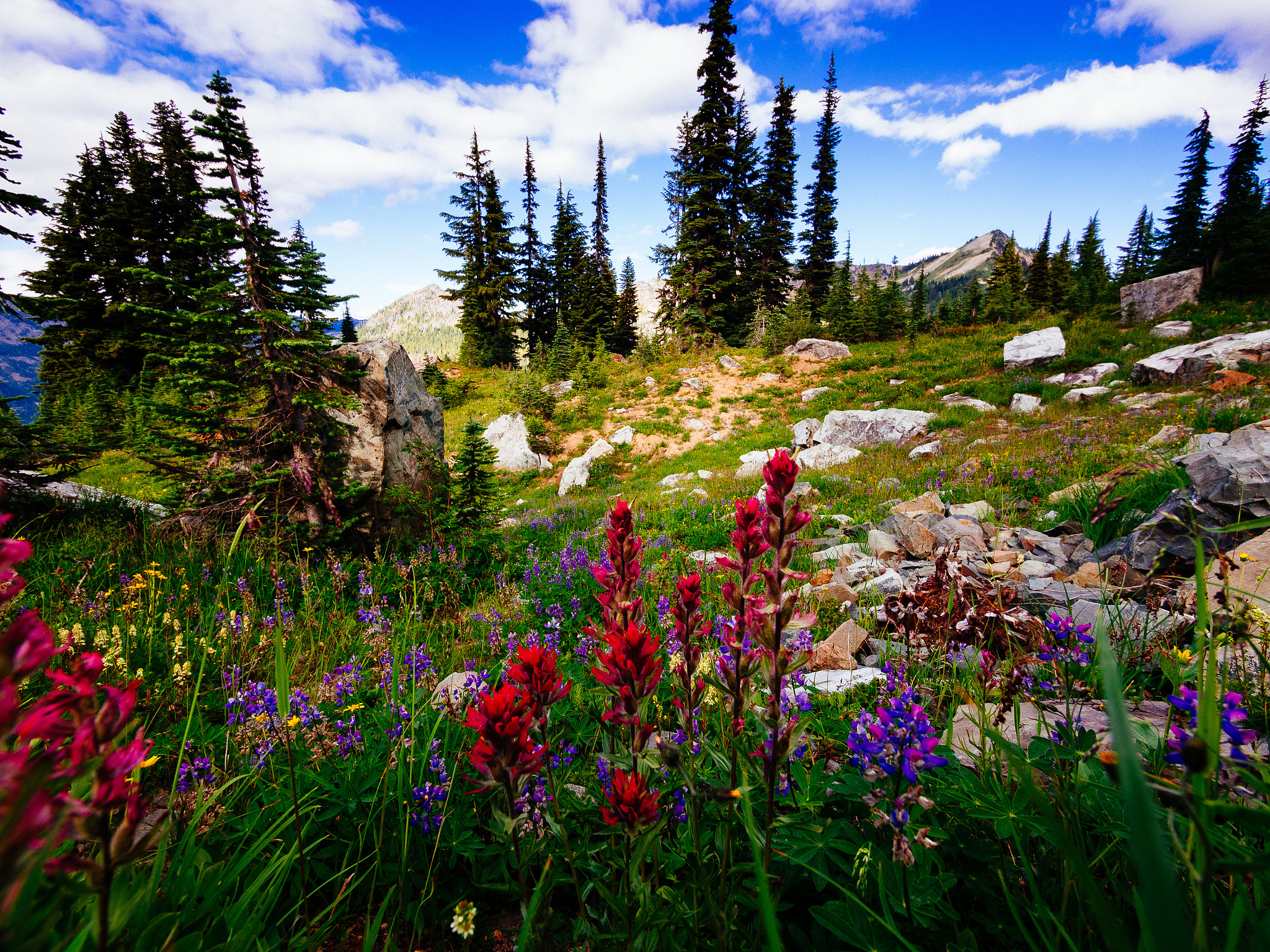
Indian paintbrush along loop trail

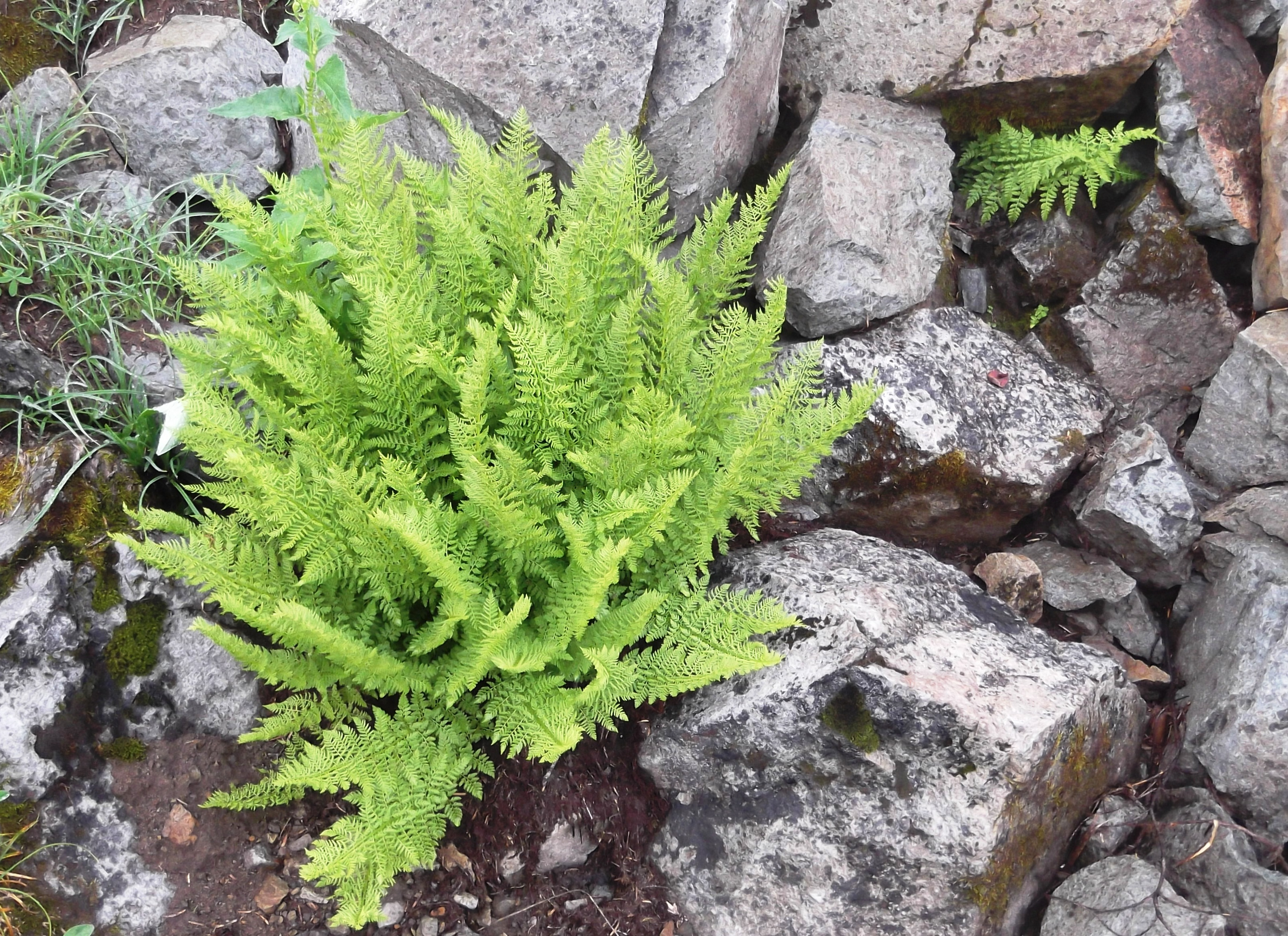
Fern along loop trail

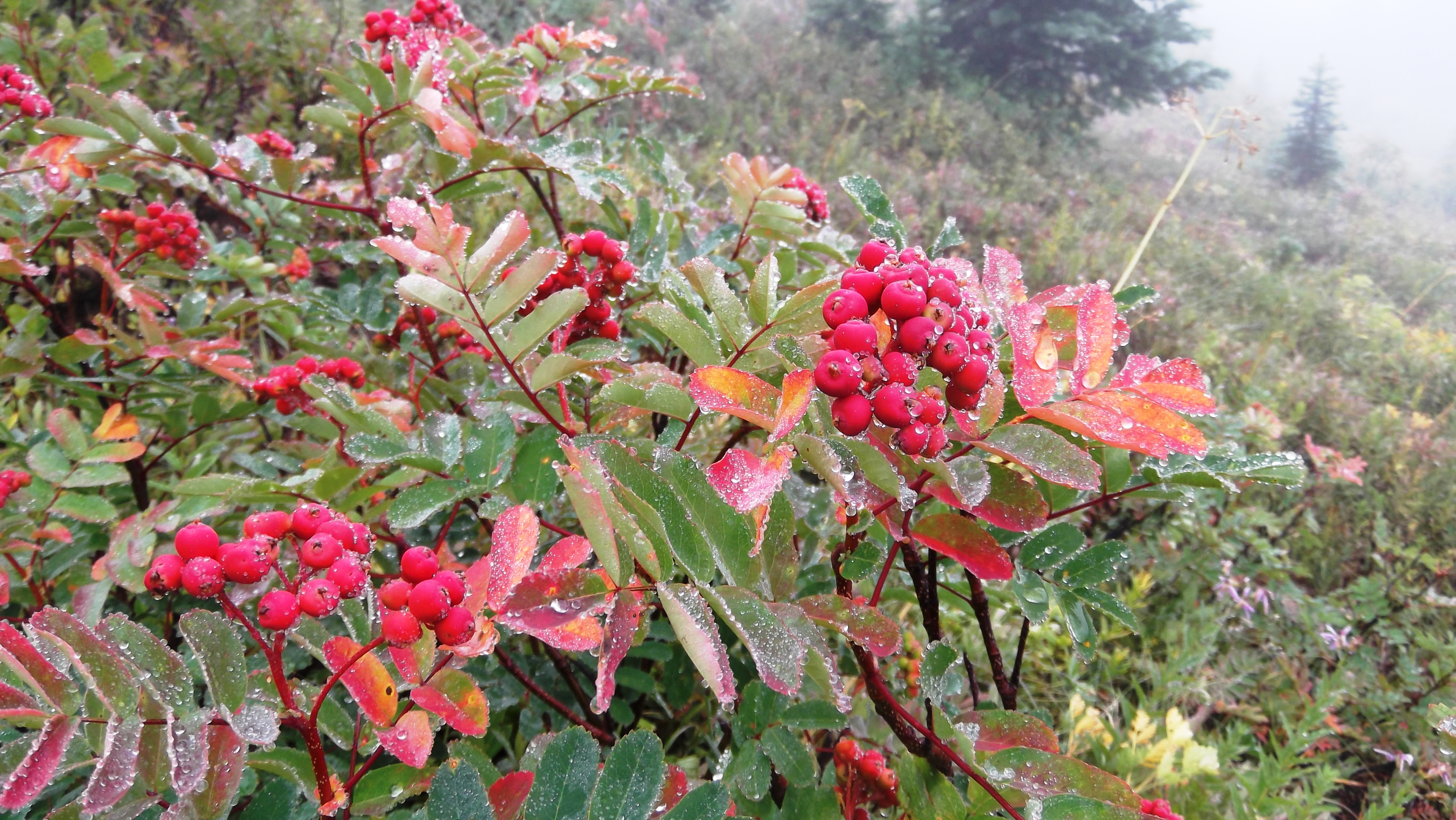
Sitka Mountain-ash
