= Deadwood (shipbuilding) =

Lower part of a ship's stem or stern

Deadwood is wooden block filler near the lower part of a ship's stem or stern.

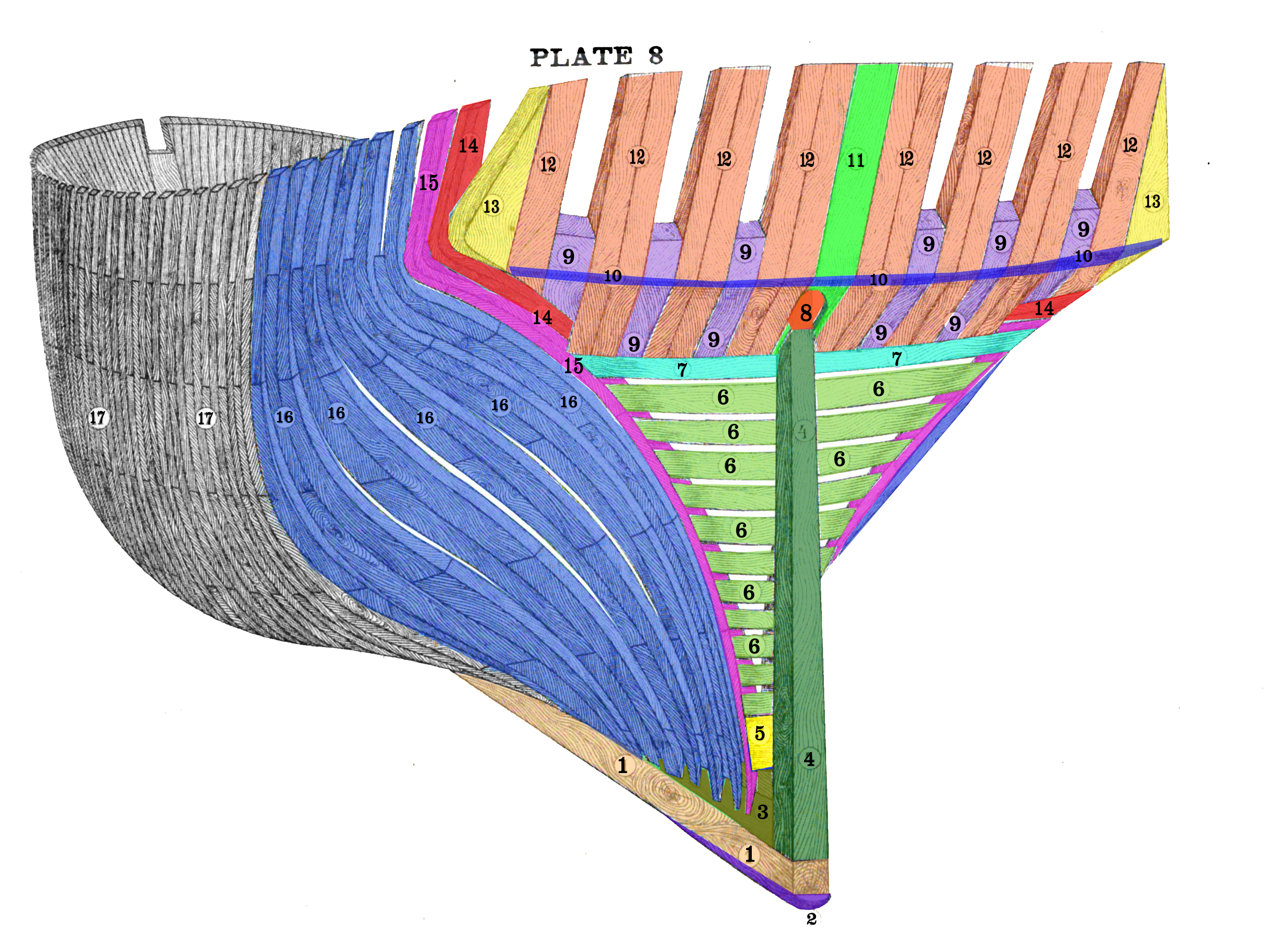
Deadwood (Labelled "3")

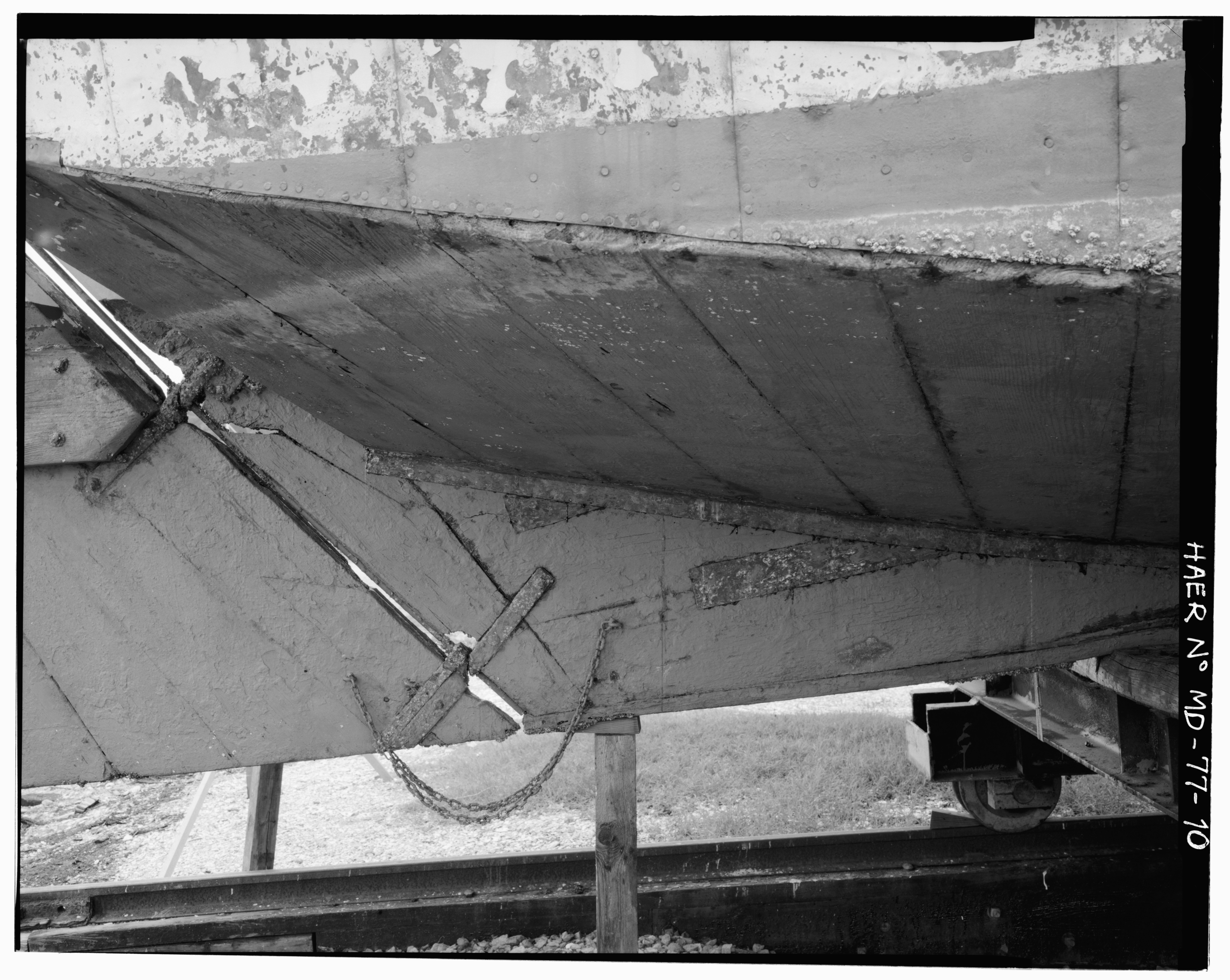
Starboard view of rudder, sternpost, and deadwood fitted in the triangle formed by the sternpost, keel, and curve of the hull planking
