= Deadwood, British Columbia =

Deadwood
- Location of Deadwood in British Columbia
- Coordinates: 49°05′59″N 118°42′04″W
- Country: Canada
- Province: British Columbia
- Region: Boundary Country
- Regional district: Kootenay Boundary

Deadwood is a ghost town in British Columbia. Deadwood existed in 1897 and was located several miles west of Greenwood, between Grand Forks and Osoyoos. A number of copper claims in the area gave rise to Deadwood. The copper claims include Big Ledge, Eagle, Butte City, Spoiled Horse, and Mother Lode. The Mother Lode became a great mine although Deadwood disappeared within a few years. Deadwood contained two hotels, a store, a post office and a school. Traces of the Algoma Hotel may still exist, although the town of Deadwood has disappeared.
