= Deadwood Draw =

- U.S. National Register of Historic Places
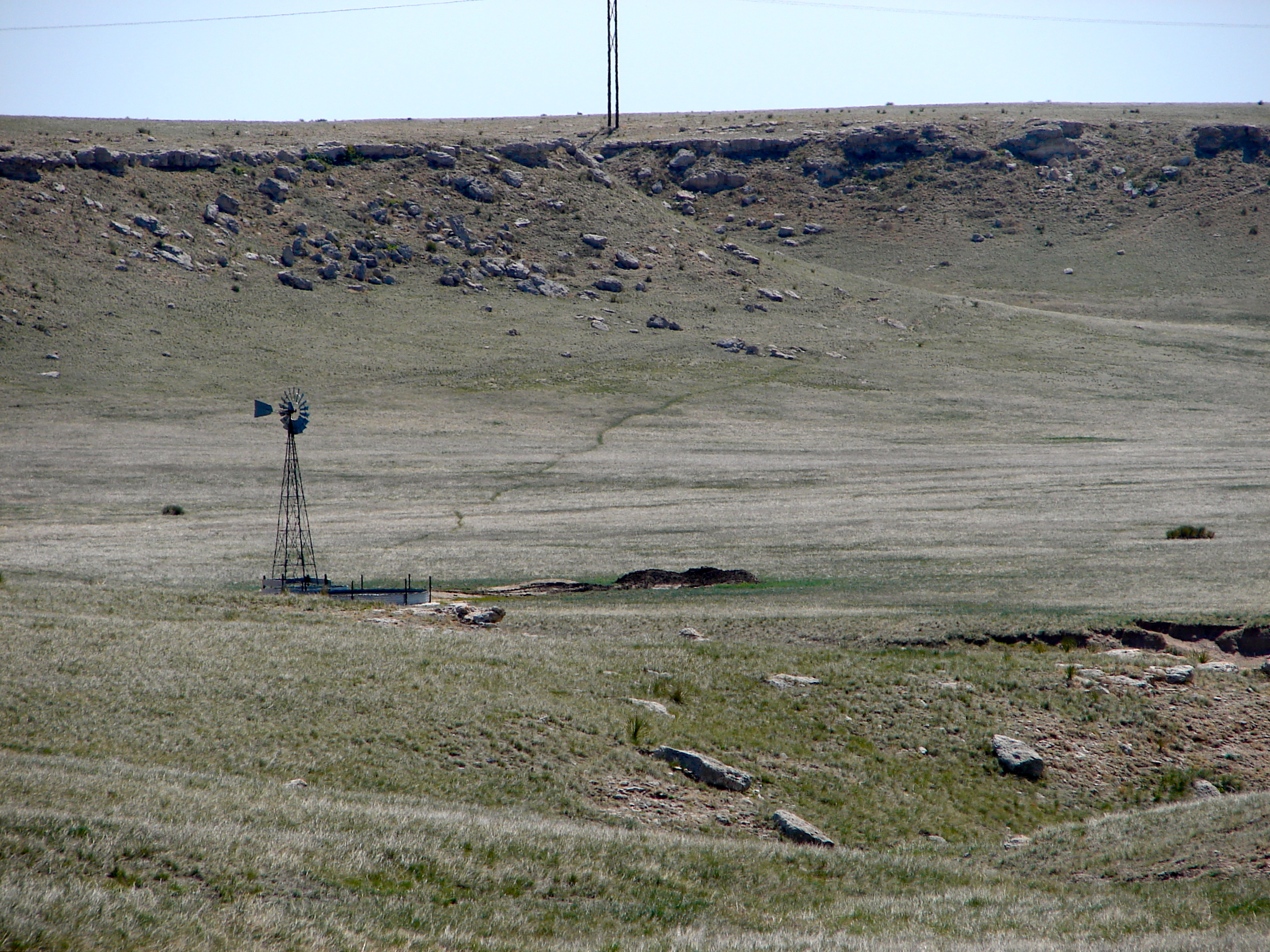
- Deadwood Draw

- Location within Nebraska Location within the United States
- Location: Northwest of Sidney, Nebraska
- Coordinates: 41°09′35″N 103°00′28.0″W
- Built: 1874 to 1881
- NRHP reference No.: 92001574
- Added to NRHP: October 8, 1992

Deadwood Draw is part of the Sidney-Black Hills Trail near Sidney, Nebraska, which provided supplies for gold mining operations in the Black Hills from 1874 to 1881. The draw served as a staging area for freight wagons carrying supplies to the Black Hills and contains ruts caused by the wheels of the freight wagons and the animals that pulled them. The draw is listed on the National Register of Historic Places.

== Background ==
In 1868, the U.S. government signed the Fort Laramie Treaty, which promised the Lakota people that the Black Hills would be exempt from white settlement. However, in 1874, an expedition into the Black Hills led by George Armstrong Custer, found deposits of gold. In 1876, Custer's discovery of gold led to the Black Hills Gold Rush. Initially, the U. S. government attempted to purchase or lease the Black Hills from the Lakota, but the government was unwilling to pay the price asked by the Lakota. When the talks broke down, the U. S. government ignored the Fort Laramie Treaty of 1868 and allowed the gold seekers to rush into the Black Hills. The Black Hills gold rush subsequently created a high demand for supplies by the gold seekers.

In 1876, Sidney, Nebraska was a small town on the Union Pacific railroad. Sidney had two main advantages over other railroad towns in Nebraska as a staging point for supplying the gold rush in the Black Hills. First, there already was a trail from Sidney north to the Red Cloud Agency, which was protected by the military between Fort Sidney and Fort Robinson. Second, the route was shorter than other possible supply points along the railroad and with the building of the Clarke Bridge toll bridge over the North Platte River by Henry T. Clarke, Sr., travel on Sidney-Black Hills Trail became easier for freight wagons.

With the opening of the Clarke bridge, the Sidney-Black Hills trail began carrying larger quantities of freight to and from the Black Hills mining operations. During the summer of 1876, the Pony Express began operating along the trail, as did several stagecoach lines. In 1876, there were an estimated 10,000 gold seekers in the Black Hills and their demand for supplies was so high that approximately 50 to 75 freight wagons left daily from Sidney, each wagon carrying 8,000 pounds (3,600 kg) of supplies.

In 1879, the Black Hills gold rush ended and so did the need for high passenger service along the trail. Company gold mining, however, continued and so the need for freight transportation along the trail increased. From 1878 to 1879, an estimated 20,000,000 pounds (8,900 long tons; 10,000 short tons) of supplies were transported to and from Sidney. By 1880, with the completion of the Chicago and Northwestern Railroad to Pierre, the transportation of freight along the trail dramatically dropped. It was quicker and cheaper to transport supplies along the new railroad than to use freight wagons along the Sidney-Black Hills trail. By the end of 1882, the trail was completely closed.

== Description ==
Deadwood Draw is located about 3 miles (4.8 km) northwest of Sidney, Nebraska, and close to the Union Pacific railroad from which supplies could be loaded onto freight wagons headed for the Black Hills via the Sidney-Black Hills trail. The draw is a wide, flat area that gently slopes up and out of Lodgepole Creek Valley and away from Union Pacific railroad and on to the Sidney-Black Hills trail. A gully channel meanders along the draw and ranges in depth from 3 feet (0.91 m) to 10 feet (3.0 m). As of 1992, there were three sets of wagon-wheel ruts and ruts cause by the oxen and horses that pulled the wagons. The rut pairs range in width from 4.1 metres (13 ft) to 5 metres (16 ft).

== Historical significance ==
Deadwood Draw was a staging area for freight wagons using the Sidney-Black Hills trail. As of 1992, when it was placed on the National Register of Historic Places, it had well-preserved ruts caused by freight wagons, stage coaches, and the animals that pulled them from 1874 to 1881. On the south end of the draw there is a depression in the ground that is thought to be the remnants of a 19th-century dugout that may have been occupied during the period of historical significance. Close to the middle of the draw is a small limestone quarry that supplied much of the limestone used to construct early buildings in Sidney.
