= Chinook Pass =

Pass through the Cascade Range

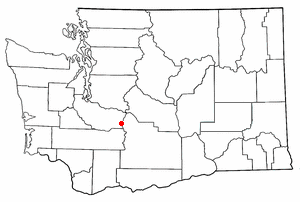
- Location of Chinook Pass
- Interactive map of Chinook Pass
- Elevation: 5,430 ft (1,660 m)
- Traversed by: State Route 410

Third Approach
- Location: Pierce / Yakima counties, Washington, United States
- Range: Cascades
- Coordinates: 46.8717°N 121.515483°W

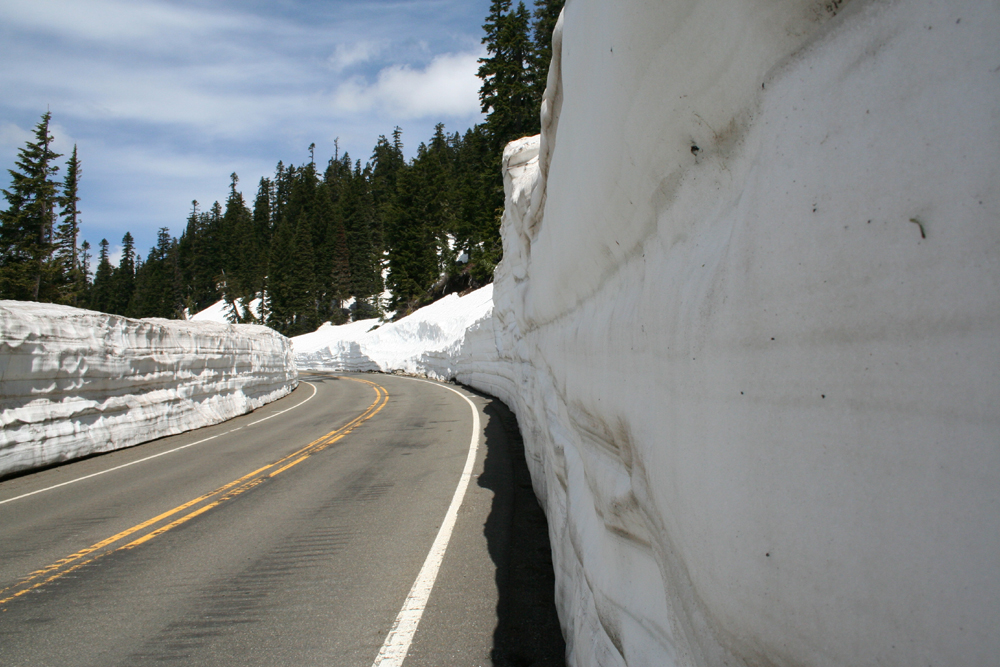
Chinook Pass in June

Chinook Pass (elevation 5430 ft./1656 m.) is a pass through the Cascade Range in the state of Washington.

The pass is located on the crest of the Cascade Range, along a ridge between Yakima Peak to the northwest of the pass, and Naches Peak to the southeast. The boundary between Pierce County, west of the pass, and Yakima County to the east, coincides with the ridge. Terrain immediately west of the pass is in the Cowlitz River watershed. Terrain on the east side drains to the Yakima River watershed.

The pass provides the east entrance to Mount Rainier National Park, and carries State Route 410 between the towns of Enumclaw and Naches. Because of the high elevation, Chinook Pass is usually closed in November due to very heavy snow and significant avalanche danger. It usually opens in mid-May and is not uncommon to have a snow depth at the summit of up to 15 feet.

As part of the All-American Road program, Route 410 through Chinook Pass has been designated by the U.S. government as the Chinook Scenic Byway. It is considered to be one of the most beautiful routes in the United States. Because the summit is above the treeline, there are many places to park along the road to view the scenery. As commercial vehicles are not allowed through the National Park section of State Route 410, this route is also favored by summer tourists.

== History ==
Chinook Pass was chosen as a route across the Cascade Mountains as a compromise. The height of the route would mean that it would likely never be a year-round road. The alternative was Naches Pass, which with the addition of a short tunnel would be much lower (and easier to keep open in winter). The Naches Pass plan is still on the books as SR 168, but it has never been built.

The cost of the tunnel was the deciding factor, and the Chinook Pass route was chosen.

The Yakima side of a road over Chinook Pass was partially completed in 1914, but then work was abandoned for several years. This section was referred to as the 'Normile Grade'. In 1921 work began again on the Yakima side, below Normile, on the American River. This work was done using horse teams. In 1924, an army tractor was brought in to speed up the work. Work on the west side of the road commenced later, and took longer. The two sides did not meet until 1931 at Tipsoo Lake near the summit.

== Recreation ==
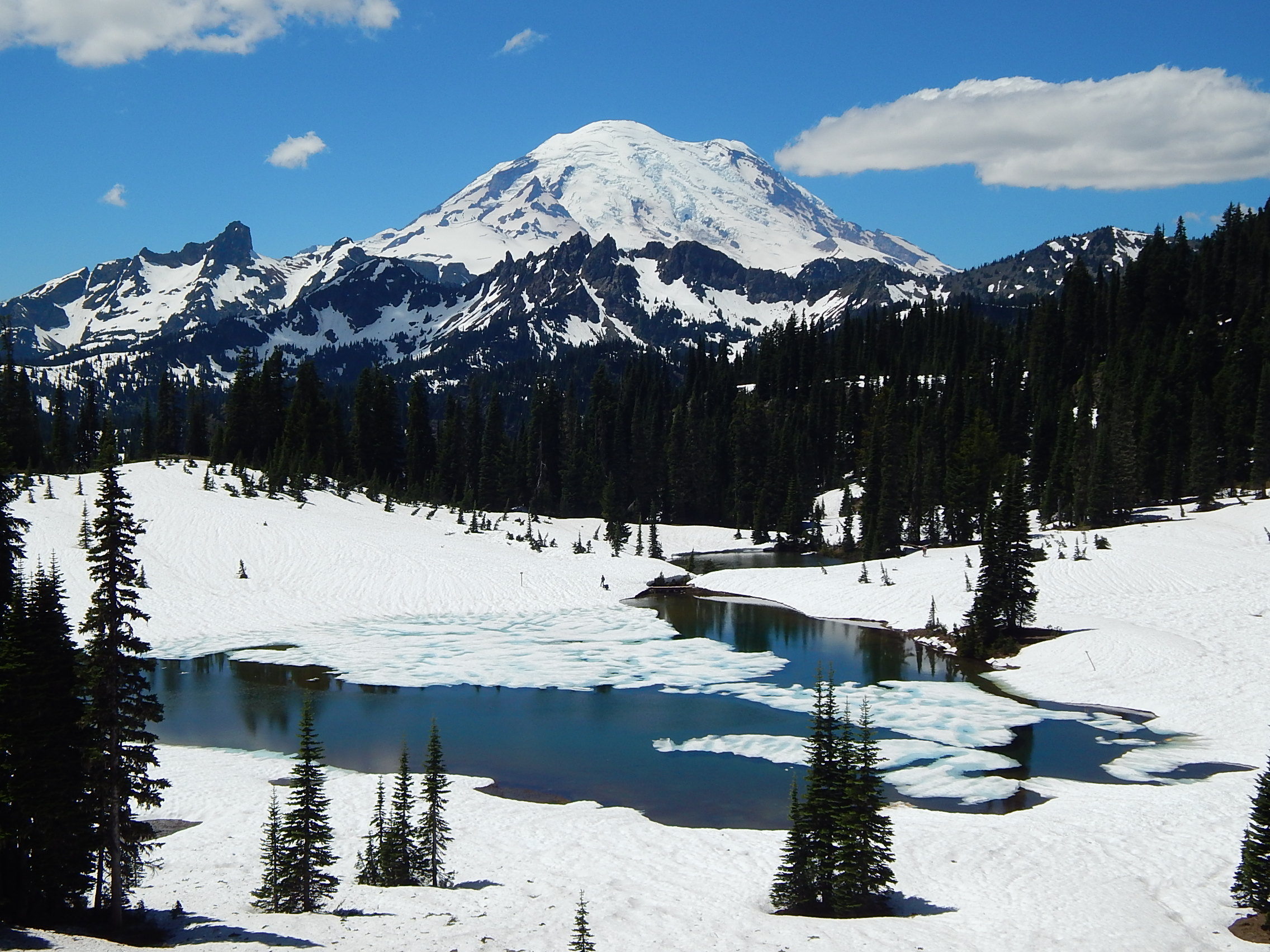
Tipsoo Lake overlook at Chinook Pass

From 1940 to 59, Chinook Pass was one of the top ski areas in the state, with a season that ran from December to June. There were numerous non-permanent rope tows that extended from Cayuse Pass to the Tipsoo Lake area. The requirement that they were temporary tows was made by the Mount Rainier National Park so the lifts could be removed when the snow melted in the summer months. With the state government plans to no longer keep Chinook Pass open during the winter months and the opening of White Pass Ski Area, lift skiing ended. It is still a very popular area for backcountry telemark skiing and snowboarding from May to July.

Tipsoo Lake is located just a few hundred meters from the summit, with a picnic area and a trail going around the lake, is one of the most photographed landscapes in the United States.

Chinook Pass is also a trailhead to the Pacific Crest Trail, providing access to Dewey Lake and Cougar Lake (in the William O. Douglas Wilderness), Crystal Mountain Ski Resort, and the Norse Peak Wilderness.

The Naches Peak Loop is a trail route that goes around Naches Peak, containing a segment of the Pacific Crest Trail.

== See also ==
- Cayuse Pass
