= Mt. Rainier Scenic Railroad =

Heritage railroad in Washington, U.S.

Coordinates: 46°45′55″N 122°11′40″W

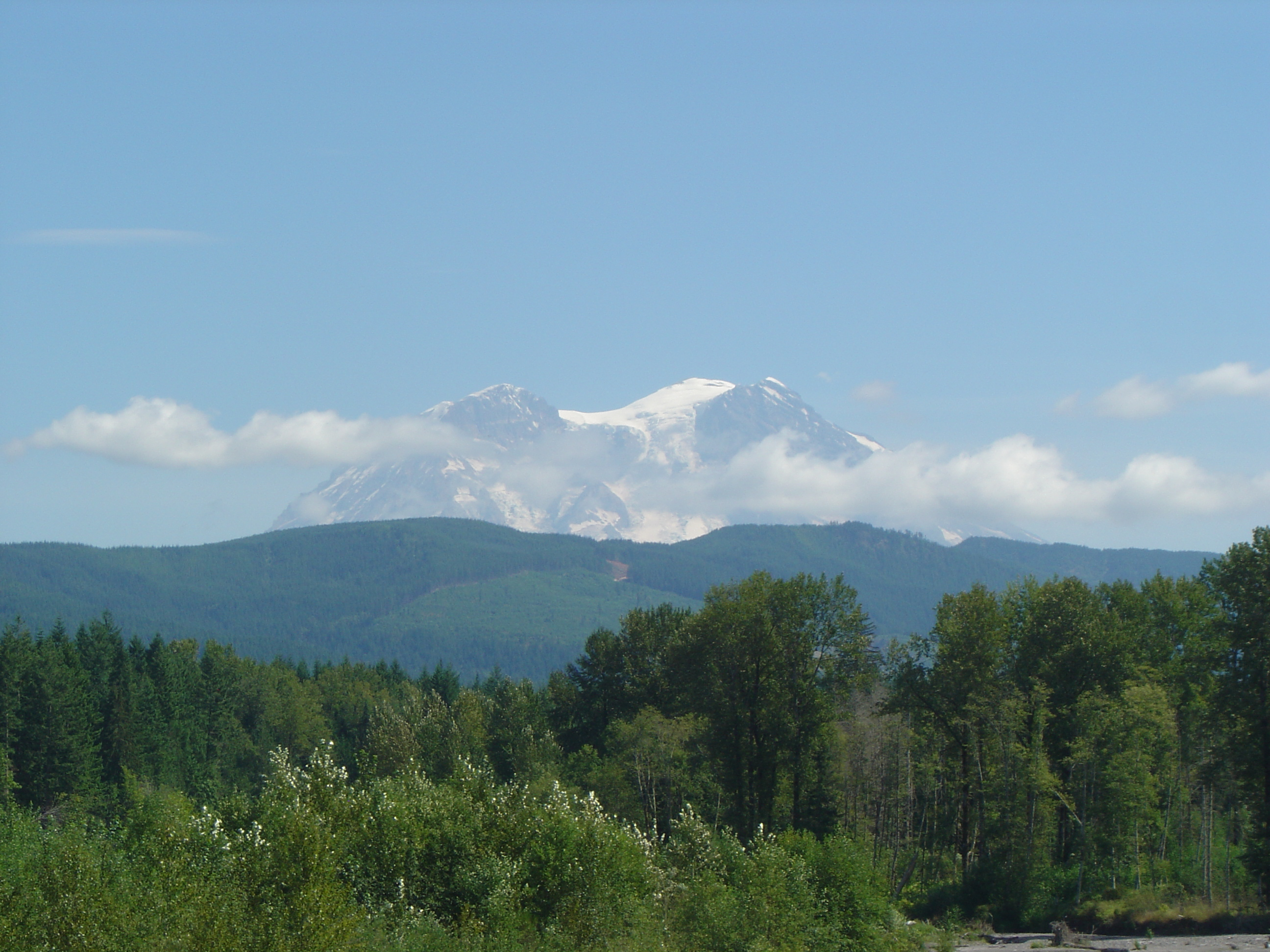
- A view of Mount Rainier from the railroad line

Overview
- Headquarters: Elbe, Washington, U.S.
- Key people: Bethan Maher, CEO; Rowdy Pierce, Rail Operations Manager
- Reporting mark: MRSR
- Locale: Lewis & Pierce counties, Washington, U.S.
- Dates of operation: 1980–present

Technical
- Track gauge: 4 ft 8 1/2 in (1,435 mm) standard gauge
- Previous gauge: 3 ft (914 mm)
- Length: 7-mile (11-kilometer) (14-mile [23-kilometer] round-trip)

Other
- Website: mtrainierrailroad.com

The Mt. Rainier Scenic Railroad (reporting mark MRSR) formerly the Mt. Rainier Railroad and Logging Museum (MRRR), is a steam-powered heritage railroad operating in the U.S. state of Washington between Elbe and Mineral. The railroad travels on trackage that passes through thick forest just south of Mount Rainier. The depot, gift shop and ticket office are located in Elbe. The train travels to the Logging Museum exhibits located in Mineral. The MRRR runs its collection of vintage rail equipment over 7 miles (11 kilometers) of track, part of Tacoma Rail's Mountain Division.

== Background ==
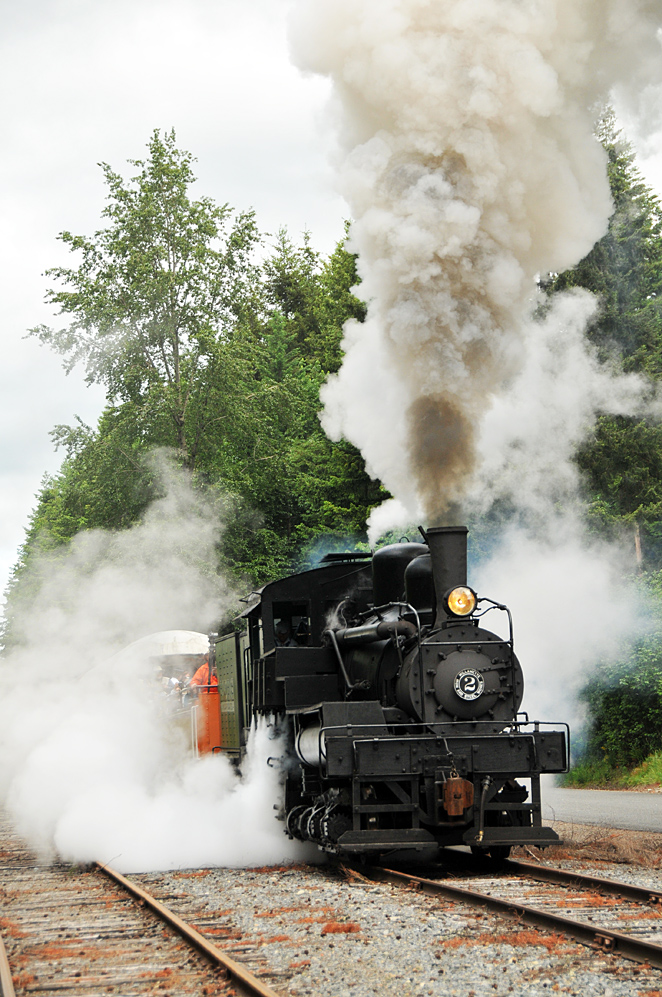
Rayonier Willamette No. 2, leaving Eatonville, June 23, 2011

The Mount Rainier Scenic Railroad (MRSR) operates over track originating in Tacoma, Washington, on a route founded there over a century ago. In 1887, the Hart brothers constructed a short, 3 ft (914 mm) narrow gauge railroad originating at 46th Street in Tacoma. In 1890, the railroad was reorganized by another interest as the Tacoma Eastern Railroad, at which time the tracks were converted to 4 ft 8 1/2 in (1,435 mm) standard gauge and extended a distance of 6 miles (9.7 kilometers). The railroad was acquired in 1900 by yet another group of investors who had financial interests east of Elbe, the Nisqually Coal Fields, thus providing the impetus to extend the Tacoma Eastern from Tacoma to the area where the MRSR runs today. The route was also extended to access stands of virgin timber south of Mount Rainier, eventually reaching Morton.

Despite formal organization under the name Tacoma Eastern, the railroad was controlled by investors far from the Pacific Northwest. The Chicago, Milwaukee, St. Paul and Pacific Railroad, also known as the "Milwaukee Road", reputedly had control of the Tacoma Eastern as early as 1901. In the 1890s, the Milwaukee Road's directors desired a connection from the Midwest to the Pacific coast. The Tacoma Eastern was an appealing investment for the Milwaukee Road. The Tacoma Eastern remained a subsidiary of the Milwaukee Road, owned through stock interest only, until 1918 when the United States Railroad Administration coordinated the Milwaukee Road's absorption of all its subsidiaries into one unified system.

The Tacoma Eastern, though, continued to exist as an independent entity within the Chicago, Milwaukee, St. Paul and Pacific Railroad system, where it was known as the National Park branch. This segment of the system was one of the Milwaukee Road's most profitable lines. As such, it was preserved amidst the Milwaukee Road's bankruptcy in 1980. The Tacoma Eastern was a viable carrier of lumber from stands of timber owned by the Weyerhaeuser Corporation, whose tracts of land still surround the MRSR today and provide commercial traffic on the line.

== History of Mount Rainier Scenic Railroad ==
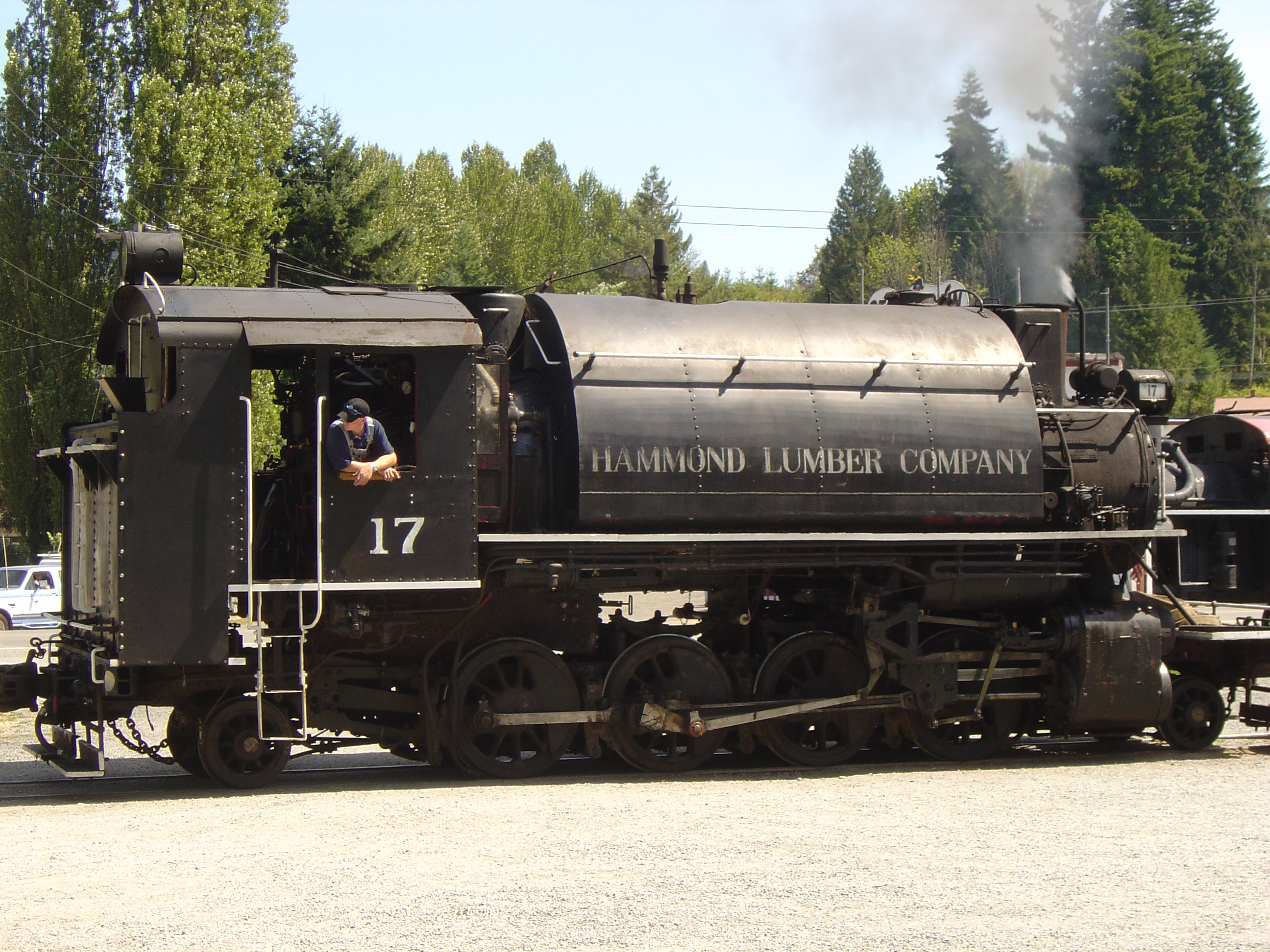
Hammond Lumber Company No. 17 under steam in the summer of 2004

In the wake of the Milwaukee Road's 1980 bankruptcy, Tacoma lumberman Tom Murray Jr. sought to open a portion of the line to tourists. MRSR was then created by Tom Murray to operate historic equipment stored in Tacoma. The Weyerhaeuser Corporation allowed the MRSR to operate its equipment on a seven-mile segment of the line from Elbe to Mineral. Weyerhaeuser maintained control of the track until 1998 when the corporation transferred control of all of its rail interests to the City of Tacoma, into what is now known as Tacoma Rail. This transfer of ownership did not affect the MRSR and its tourist operations, nor the availability of the route to commercial shipment. In mid-2016, due to decline and poor management, MRSR was sold to American Heritage Railways, which also owns the world-renowned Durango & Silverton Narrow Gauge Railroad, rebranding the MRSR as the Mount Rainier Railroad and Logging Museum.

American Heritage Railways operated the Mount Rainier Railroad & Logging Museum from 2016 to 2020, when it was closed due to the COVID-19 pandemic. American Heritage Railways then sought a new owner for the operation before the newly revived Western Forest Industries Museum acquired the railroad in 2022. In 2023, the railroad began offering a rail cycle experience from New Reliance between Elbe and Eatonville. On August 1, 2023, following a deal to run excursions on the Chehalis–Centralia Railroad falling through due to the latter's financial difficulties, it was announced that the Mount Rainier Scenic Railroad would resume service.

The Mt. Rainier Scenic Railroad resumed train operations with a limited excursion schedule in September and October 2023. After a hiatus since 2019, the historic steam engine "Polson 70" proudly pulled two vintage passenger cars, an open-air car, and a specially outfitted baggage car, serving as a concession and gift shop. The excursions included express trips from Elbe to Mineral. These long-awaited excursions mark the first under the new ownership of Western Forest Industries Museum (WFIM), a local nonprofit organization that assumed control of the railroad in August 2022, after its closure by its former for-profit operator, American Heritage Railways. With a storied history dating back to 1980, Mt. Rainier Scenic Railroad has played a vital role in the economic prosperity of southern Pierce County, as well as in preserving the region's rich local history. Having served over 1.6 million passengers, the railroad is now poised to embark on a new journey under WFIM's vision.

=== 2025 trestle bridge fire ===
On April 30, 2025, a trestle bridge between Mineral and Morton caught fire and was destroyed. While it was not on a portion of the railroad being used to host excursions, officials said they had hoped to use the trestle in the future. The 26-span trestle bridge (Note: The trestle that burned down in 2025 was listed in early reports to be a 28-span bridge. See sources in the section for the discrepancy.) was 396.8 feet (120.9 m) long, with a 12% curve and a 1.9% grade. An investigation was opened into the cause of the fire, as railroad officials alleged arson.

By July, no suspects had been found though contracts to demolish remaining portions of the span were nearing completion. MSMR posted that over $207,000 had been raised via charitable contributions; the funds are to be used to support the rebuilding of the bridge as well as efforts for additional safety precautions.

== Operations ==
Before 2016, steam operations were run based on the availability of volunteer operators, who comprised the great majority of railroad personnel. However, after being purchased by American Heritage Railways in 2016, the railroad's operations were run by professional staff. The MRRR's regular schedule ran weekends from Memorial Day to late October, with special event Polar Express trains from November through December. In May 2020, American Heritage Railways announced that the railroad would cease operations "for the foreseeable future" due to financial losses caused by the COVID-19 pandemic. The final Polar Express train ran from November to December 2019. On September 15, 2022, it was announced that the railroad would resume operations by 2025, including the restoration of track to Eatonville that will add 9 miles (14 kilometers) to the railroad. On August 1, 2023; the railroad announced a resumption of service to begin in the fall season.

== Equipment ==
The railroad has three steam engines, as well as a diesel locomotive in regular service, along with several other locomotives of both types of engines. Most of the railroad's engines are geared steam engines. These specialized types of steam engines — Shay engines, Heisler engines, Climax engines and a Willamette engine were used in the early 20th century for logging. Compared to conventional steam locomotives, geared locomotives were better suited for the steep grades, sharp curves and uneven profiles of hastily laid tracks typical of logging operations. Thus, the MRSR sought to preserve and operate historic geared locomotives and related logging technology to present visitors with a sense of a bygone logging era critical to the development of the Pacific Northwest.

=== List of locomotives ===
Key
Operable
On display
Being Restored

Number	Builder	Model	Works number	Built	Acquired	Last operated	Image
No. 2	Willamette Iron and Steel Locomotive Works	3-truck geared steam tender locomotive	#34	1929	2002	2018	No. 2 under steam at Mineral, Washington
No. 70	Baldwin Locomotive Works	2-8-2 tender engine	#55355	1922	1992	2025	No. 70 under steam at Mineral, Washington
No. 10	Climax Locomotive Works	3-truck Climax steam tender engine	#1693	1928	1979	2011	No. 10 in September 2017
No. 11	Lima Locomotive Works	3-truck "Pacific Coast" Shay tender engine	#3327	1929	1981	2001	No. 11 laying partially dismantled in the "House of Gears"
No. 91	Heisler Locomotive Works	3-truck "West Coast Special" Heisler tender engine	#1595	1930	1980	2011	No. 91 under steam at Expo 86
No. 10 (PLC): R.J. "Bud" Kelly	Heisler Locomotive Works	3-truck "West Coast Special" Heisler tender engine	#1252	1912	1970's or 1980's	1973	No. 10 on display next to the Elbe depot
No. 45	Baldwin Locomotive Works	2-6-2 tender engine	#27311	1906	1998	1961	No. 45 in storage at the Polson museum in 2014
No. 5	H.K. Porter, Inc.	2-8-2 tender engine	#6860	1924	1985	2003	No. 5 in Elbe
No. 17	American Locomotive Company	2-8-2ST tank engine	#68057	1929	1980	2019	No. 17 switching in Elbe, Washington
No. 1 "C.F. White"	H.K. Porter, Inc.	0-4-2ST tank engine	#681	1885	2013	1995	Old No. 1 on display at the museum, 2017
No. 7012A	General Motors Electro-Motive Division	EMD F9 Diesel-electric	#21108	1956	1982	2025	7012A in September 2017
No. 7134	American Locomotive Company	ALCO S-1 Diesel-electric					
No. 41	American Locomotive Company	ALCO RSD-1 Diesel-electric	#69570	1941			
No. 481	General Motors Electro-Motive Division	EMD NW2 Diesel-electric	#5336	1942	2001	2015	

== See also ==
- Oregon Coast Scenic Railroad
- Northwest Railway Museum
- Chelatchie Prairie Railroad
- Chehalis–Centralia Railroad
- List of heritage railroads in the United States
