= Mineral, Washington murders =

Unsolved serial killings in Washington (1985)

Coordinates: 46.7169°N 122.1808°W

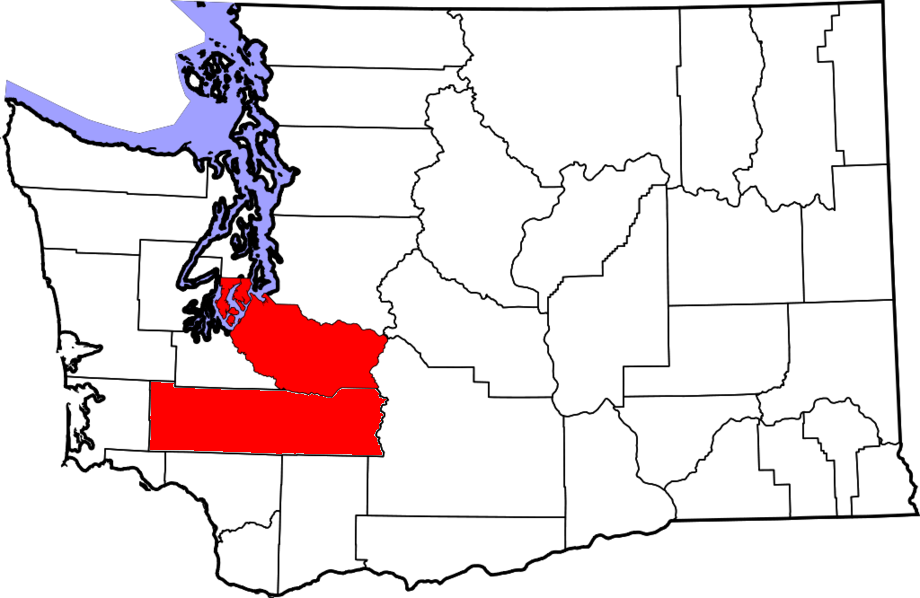
- Lewis and Pierce Counties, where the murders occurred
- Born: Unknown assailant
- Other name: The Tube Sock Killings

Details
- Victims: 4–6
- Span of crimes: August 10 – December 12, 1985 (possibly as early as March 1985; undetermined)
- Country: United States
- State: Washington

The Mineral, Washington murders, dubbed by the media as "the Tube Sock Killings," is a series of unsolved murders that occurred in remote areas of Lewis and Pierce counties, Washington, near the remote community of Mineral, Washington, in 1985. The murder cases were widely publicized, and were featured on the television series Unsolved Mysteries in 1989.

== Case ==
=== Harkins and Cooper ===
On August 10, 1985, Stephen Harkins, 27, and his girlfriend, Ruth Cooper, 42, left their Tacoma, Washington home for a weekend camping trip at Tule Lake in Pierce County. When the two did not return to their jobs at a Tacoma vocational school the following Monday, their families reported them missing. Four days later, on August 14, hikers passing through Pierce County found Harkins' body near a remote campsite. He had been shot in the head, and his body, still in a sleeping bag, suggested he had been murdered while sleeping. Nearby, searchers also found Harkins' and Cooper's pet dog, who had been shot to death as well. At the time, law enforcement suspected that the case may have been connected to the murders of Edward Smith and Kimberly Dianne LaVine, a couple from Kent, Washington who were abducted, murdered, and disposed of in a gravel pit near the Columbia River in March 1985.

On October 26, a skull was found at the dead end of Eighth Avenue South, near Harts Lake, about 1.5 mi (2.4 km) from where Harkins' body was found. Dental records confirmed the skull belonged to Cooper, and two days later on October 28, her body and her purse were also recovered from the area, 50 ft (15 m) from where her skull had been found. A tube sock had been tied around Cooper's neck. According to the autopsy, Cooper had died of "homicidal violence," though a spokesman later stated she had died of a gunshot wound to the abdomen. After the discovery of Cooper, the murders were publicized by Crime Stoppers in an attempt to recover information leading to the arrest of those responsible.

=== Riemer and Robertson ===
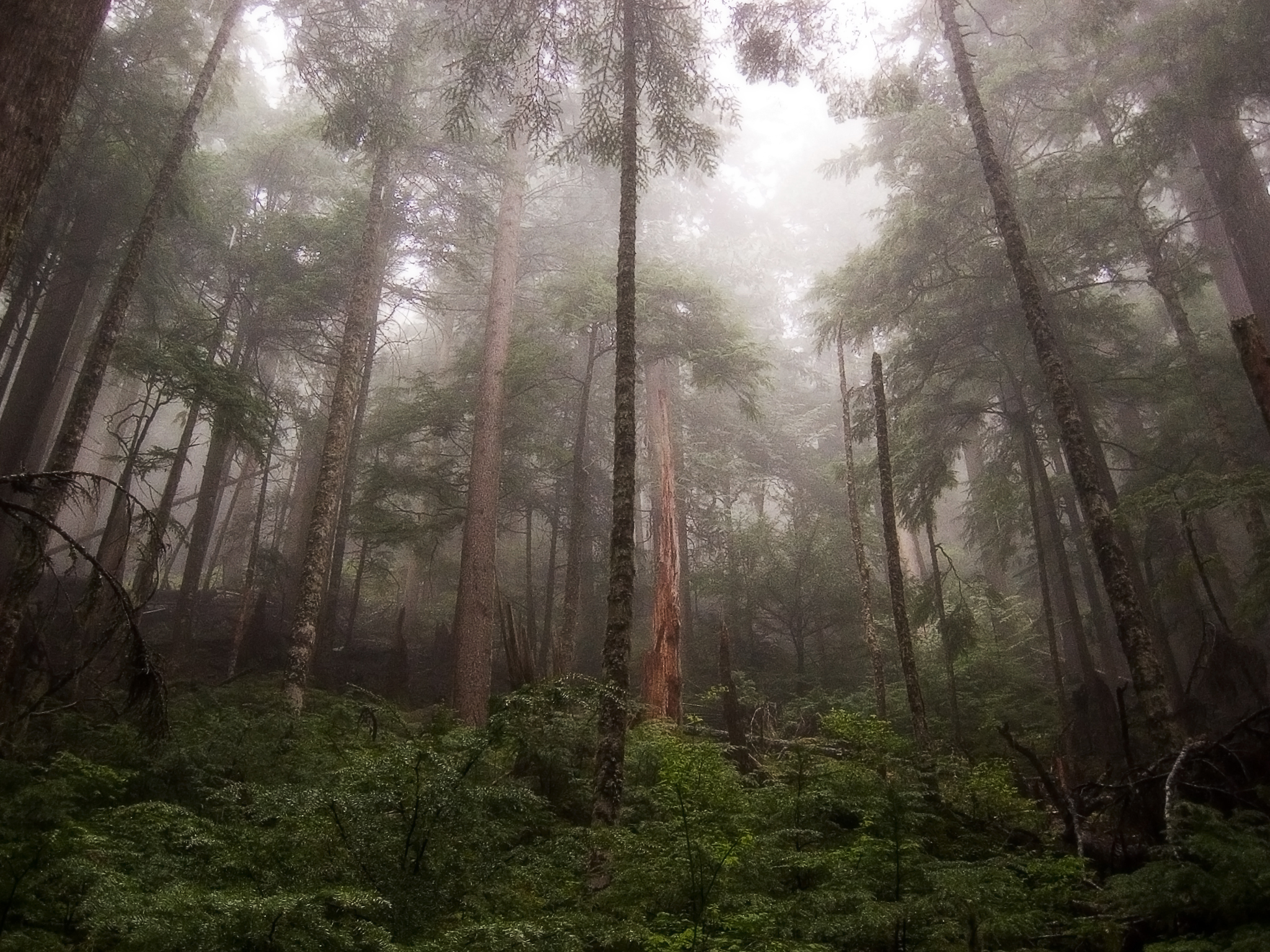
Terrain in Pierce County, Washington, where the murders occurred

Over a month after the discovery of Ruth Cooper, on December 12, 1985, Mike Riemer, 36, his girlfriend, Diana Robertson, 21, and their daughter, Crystal Robertson, age 2, traveled from their Tacoma home to Pierce County, planning to find a Christmas tree.

Riemer, an animal trapper, also planned to check on traps he had set in the area. Later that evening, customers at a Kmart store 30 mi (48 km) north in Spanaway found the couple's daughter, Crystal, standing outside the store entrance. Crystal was placed in temporary foster care until her maternal grandmother saw her photograph on a local news broadcast two days later. When asked where her mother was, the dazed two-year-old told her grandmother that her "Mommy was in the trees." According to investigators, the two-year-old was "not nearly verbal enough" to provide any information.

Police searched the area both on foot and by air, looking for evidence of Riemer's red 1982 Plymouth pickup truck, but efforts remained fruitless. On February 18, 1986, over two months after the couple's disappearance, the body of Diana Robertson was discovered half-buried in snow by a motorist near a logging road off of Washington State Route 7, just south of Elbe. Bloodhounds scoured the area in the following days, but 6 in (150 mm) of snowfall impeded the search. Riemer's pickup truck was also found near Robertson's body.

In the truck, police discovered a note on the dashboard that read "I love you, Diana." It was written on a manila envelope. Robertson's mother claimed the handwriting was that of Riemer. Bloodstains were also found on the seat of the truck. An autopsy revealed that Diana Robertson had been stabbed seventeen times, and, as with Ruth Cooper, was also found with a tube sock tied around her neck.

Due to Riemer's disappearance, investigators suspected he may have been responsible for Robertson's murder, and had abandoned his daughter at the Kmart store and then subsequently fled. However, they were unable to determine a solid motive for Riemer to kill his girlfriend. Police theorized that Riemer may have been responsible for Harkins' and Cooper's murders as well; an alternate theory, however, claimed that Riemer was also a victim of the same killer who had murdered Robertson, Harkins, and Cooper.

In February 1986, after the discovery of Robertson's body, the Seattle Post-Intelligencer published an article revealing that Riemer had been charged with domestic assault against Robertson on October 19, 1985. However, the couple had reconciled by December, the month in which they disappeared. Riemer, who worked as a roofer at Seattle’s Queen City Sheet Metal and Roofing Inc., was described by his employer as a "typical roofer who worked hard and played hard."

=== 2000s development ===
On March 18, 2009, hikers discovered a partial human skull later determined to be that of Mike Riemer. It was found in an area within a mile radius of where Robertson's body had been discovered in 1986. After recovery of the skull, Lewis County investigators stated that they believed Riemer could have been a possible victim of homicide as well, though his cause of death could not be determined. Based on the condition of the skull, however, authorities were able to rule out a gunshot wound to the head.

== Media depiction ==
In September 1989, the case was featured by the series Unsolved Mysteries.

== See also ==
- List of fugitives from justice who disappeared
- List of serial killers in the United States
- Lists of solved missing person cases
- List of unsolved murders (1980–1999)
