= Pearl Thrasher =

American politician (1917–1970)

Pearl G. Thrasher
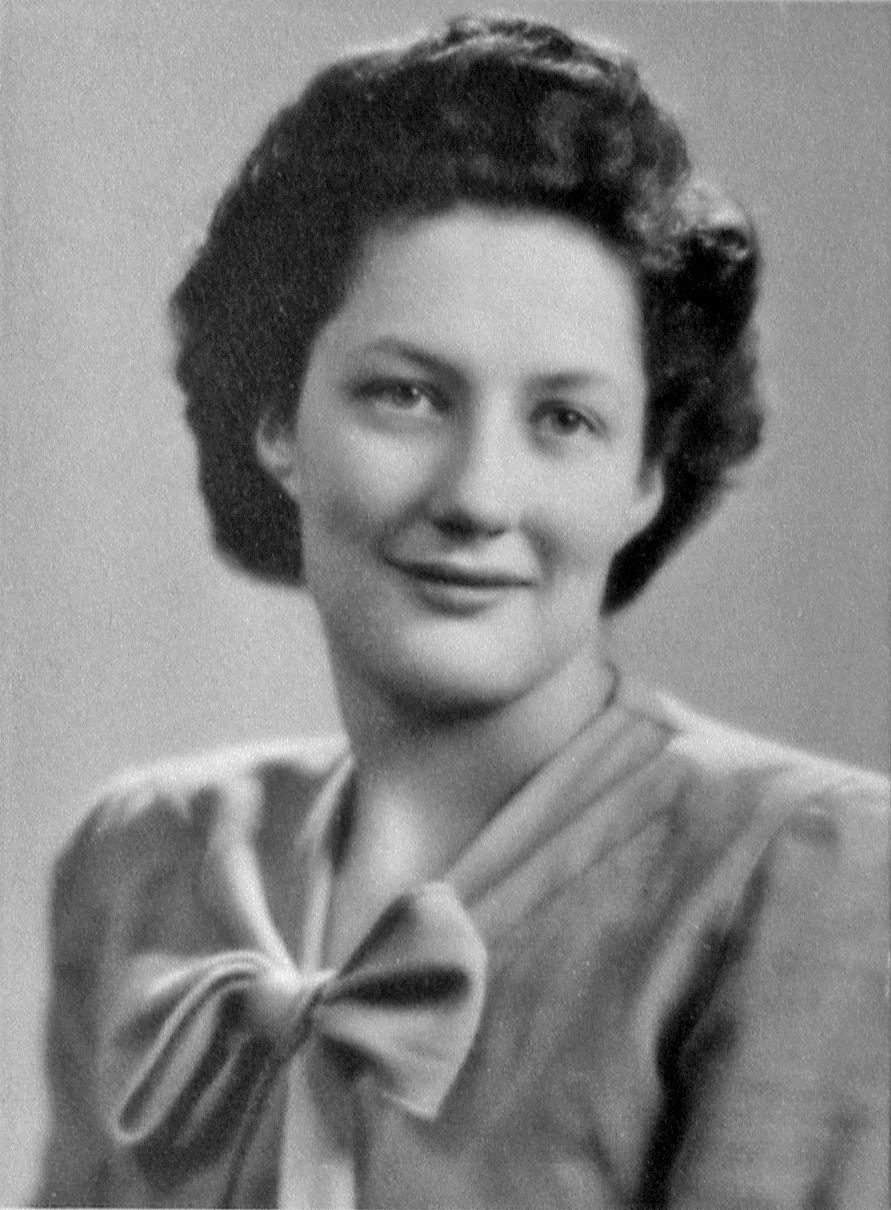
- Thrasher c. 1944

Member of the Washington House of Representatives from the 31st district
- In office January 8, 1945 – January 13, 1947 Serving with Lloyd Lindgren
- Preceded by: Emma Taylor Harman; Tom Carslay
- Succeeded by: Asa T. Jones; Harry F. Kittelman

Personal details
- Born: December 12, 1917 Mineral, Washington, U.S.
- Died: January 23, 1970 (aged 52) Minneapolis, Minnesota, U.S.
- Party: Democratic
- Other political affiliations: Communist (disputed); Progressive (1948)
- Spouse: Charles Elmer Thrasher (m. 1936; div. 1947)
- Children: 3
- Occupation: Aircraft electrician

Pearl Gladys Thrasher (née Kingsley; December 12, 1917 – January 23, 1970) was an American aircraft electrician and politician who served as a member of the Washington House of Representatives from 1945 to 1947. She represented Washington's 31st legislative district as a Democrat.

In 1954, former Communist Party functionary Barbara Hartle testified before the House Un-American Activities Committee that several prominent state Democrats were secret Communists, naming Thrasher among them.
