= Mineral, Washington =

- Census-designated place
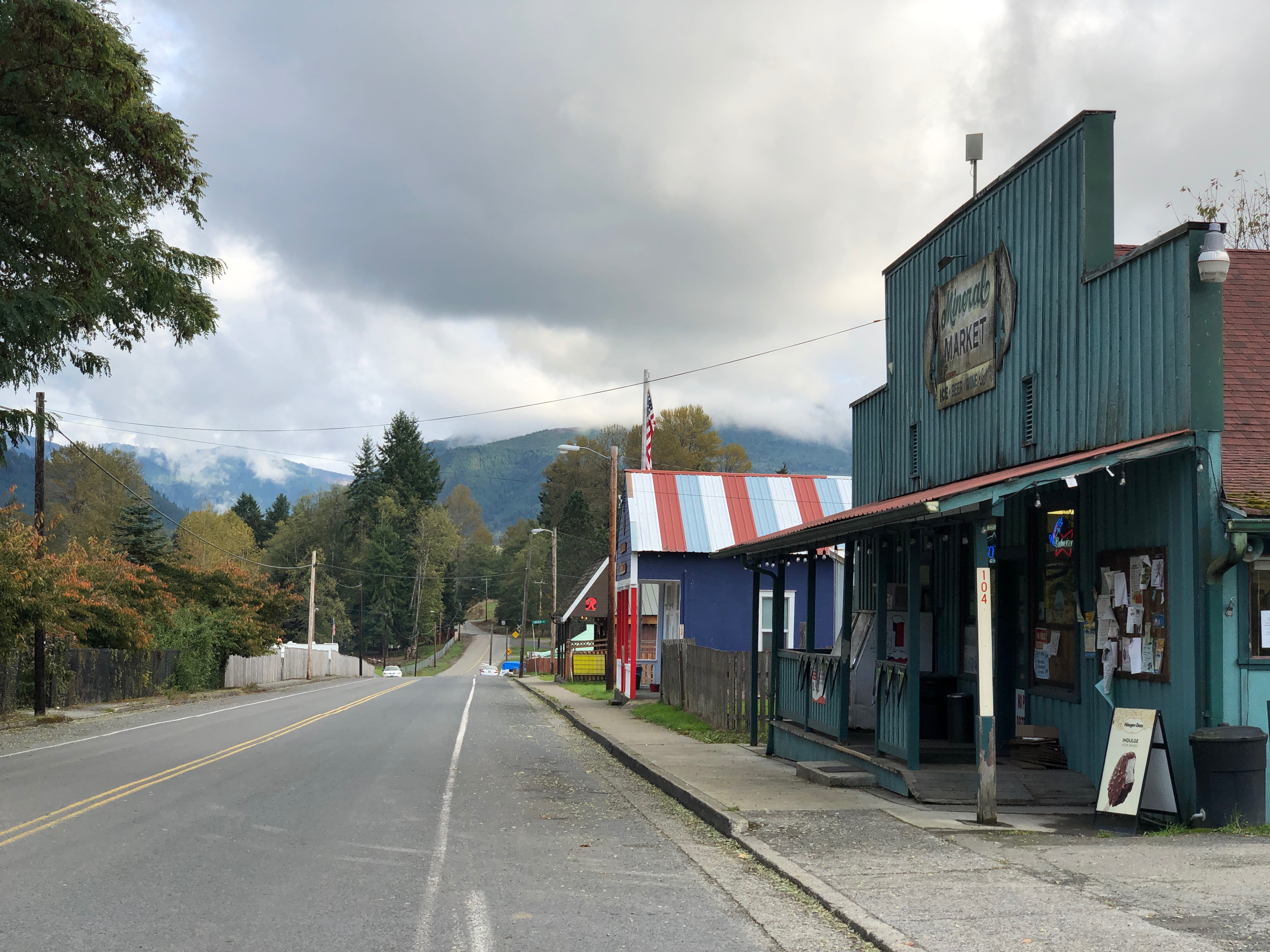
- Downtown Mineral

- Location within Washington (state) Location within the United States
- Coordinates: 46°43′09″N 122°11′10″W
- Country: United States
- State: Washington
- County: Lewis

Area
  - Total: 0.66 sq mi (1.72 km^{2})
  - Land: 0.66 sq mi (1.72 km^{2})
  - Water: 0 sq mi (0.0 km^{2})
- Elevation: 1,473 ft (449 m)

Population (2020)
  - Total: 193
  - Density: 291/sq mi (112/km^{2})
- Time zone: UTC-8 (Pacific (PST))
  - Summer (DST): UTC-7 (PDT)
- ZIP Code: 98355
- Area code(s): 360, 564
- FIPS code: 53-46090
- GNIS feature ID: 2586741

Mineral is an unincorporated community and census-designated place (CDP) in Lewis County, Washington, on State Route 7 near the Pierce/Lewis county line. As of the 2020 census, Mineral had a population of 193.

Mineral originally began as a logging camp and mining town. Prospectors searching the area for gold instead found coal and arsenic. By the early 1920s, the mines closed and a devastating fire to the town's largest sawmill ended the early, peak years of the community. Mineral began to turn to tourism as its main industry, primarily through recreational fishing on Mineral Lake. A local attraction is the Mineral Log Lodge, listed on the National Register of Historic Places.

== History ==
The area was first settled by non-indigenous people in the 1890s, mostly homesteaders and coal mining and timber prospectors. The earliest known settler was the Fritz family in 1891. The town was founded no later than 1897 on the shore of Mineral Lake, adopting the name from the lake and the veins of ruby of arsenic in the region. The area was referred to as Mineral City and Mineral Creek in its early days. The lake was originally known as Round Top Lake and also as Goldsboro Lake. Many of Mineral’s settlers were from Kentucky.

Primarily known as a timber community, Mineral's economic beginnings started with a false find of silver on Mineral Creek in 1892, leading to land speculation and a silver rush. A small colony under the name Mineral City, and an undeveloped camp known as Contact City, began but lack of the promised metal led to abandonment. The remains of both mining sites disappeared after a flood in 1902.

In place of silver, arsenic mines were opened and the first roads into the community were built in 1900. The first store opened in 1902. A rail line to the community that offered passenger and freight services was completed in 1905 by the Tacoma Eastern Railroad, leading to the economic expansion of what would become Mineral. The arsenic mines were temporarily successful for approximately five years but they began to wane, losing value as the market for the mineral disappeared. A minor recession occurred due to the closing of the mines as workers were paid in company stock rather than wages.

Timber became a major economic force in Mineral after the Mineral Logging Company sawmill was constructed in 1907, at one point employing 200 people. Mineral Lake was often used as a holding pond due to the vast amounts of logging and children who swam in the lake often received infections known as "cedar poisoning". The population peaked at 1,000 residents, and possibly as high as 1,600, by the 1920s, with a flourishing downtown district that contained three general stores, an ice cream shop and a variety of entertainment venues. A movie house showed three different films per week. Tourism was an important economic engine during this time and the town grew large enough to contain two hotels and an automobile agency.

During Mineral's timber years, Scandinavian and Japanese laborer communities existed in the town. Although Japanese children attended the local school, the Japanese community remained separate from the white population of Mineral.

Several factors led to the decrease of the town. Leading the decline was conversion to oil as a primary fuel burning source after World War I and a destructive coal mine fire in 1920. In the following years, coal efforts ceased due to more efficient mining methods, and the largest mill, owned by the Mineral Lake Lumber Company, was destroyed by fire in 1922 and never rebuilt. The town shrunk in size and became a "bedroom community".

Timber harvesting in the hills around Mineral remained active though at a lesser rate. A small, though fruitful undertaking was the retrieving of hemlock logs that sunk to the bottom of the lake during the early 20th century. A shingle mill, known originally as the M.R. Smith Shingle Company, remained in operation until the mid-1970s. The last store from Mineral's early years burned down in 1975.

Mineral is near the location of the famous Kenneth Arnold UFO sighting in 1947. The 1985 Mineral, Washington murders occurred near the community.

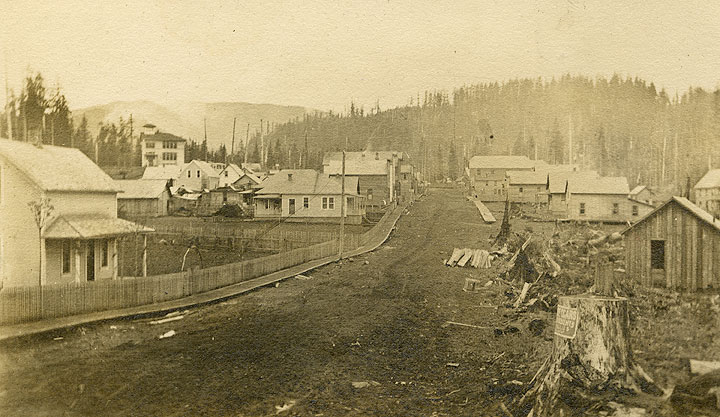
Mineral, Washington, 1910

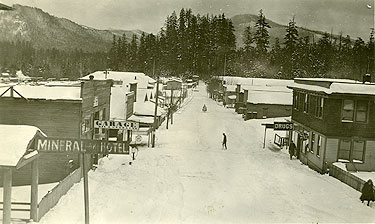
Downtown Mineral, 1923

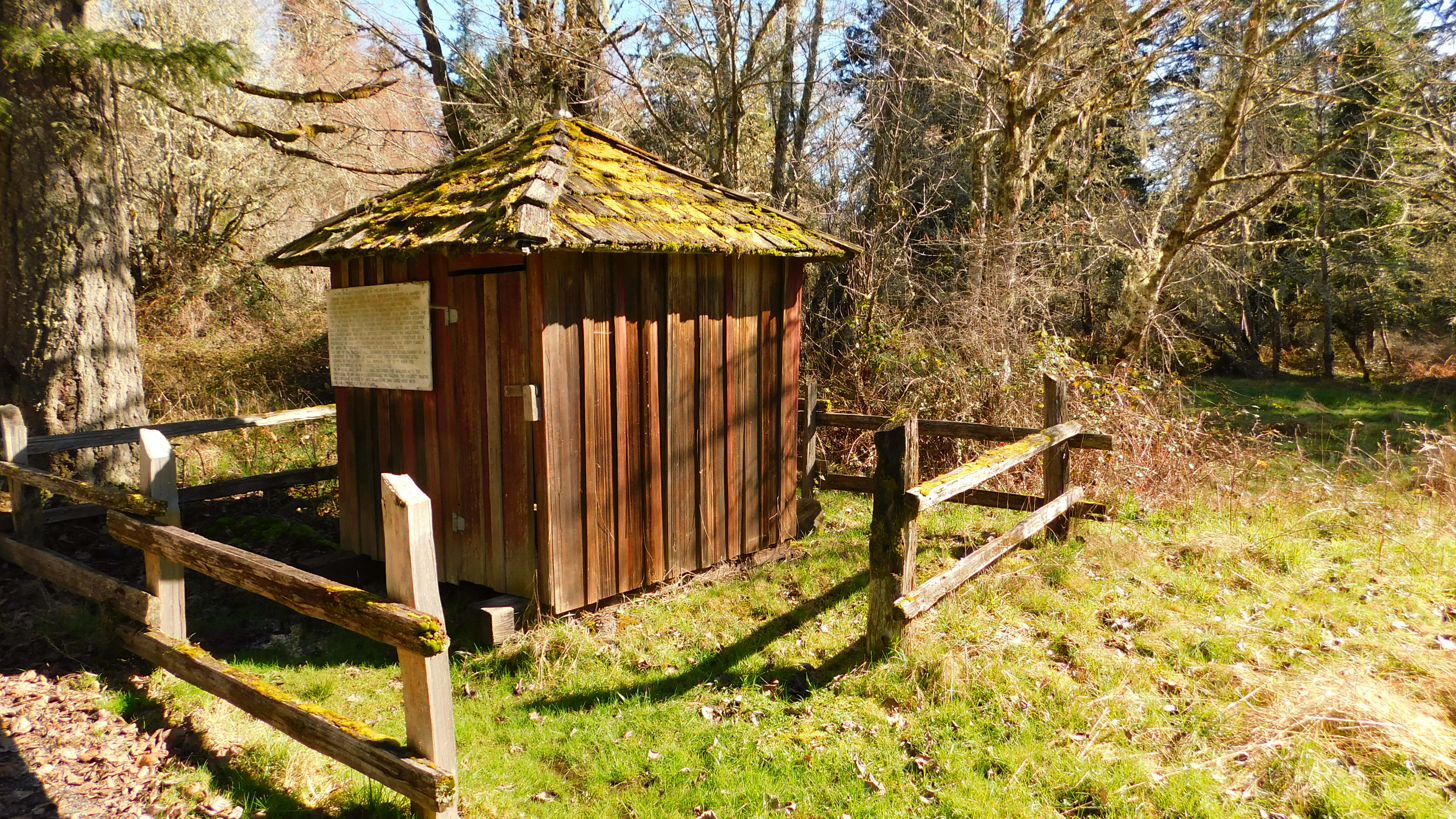
World's Smallest Post Office, 2026

=== YMCA Campground ===
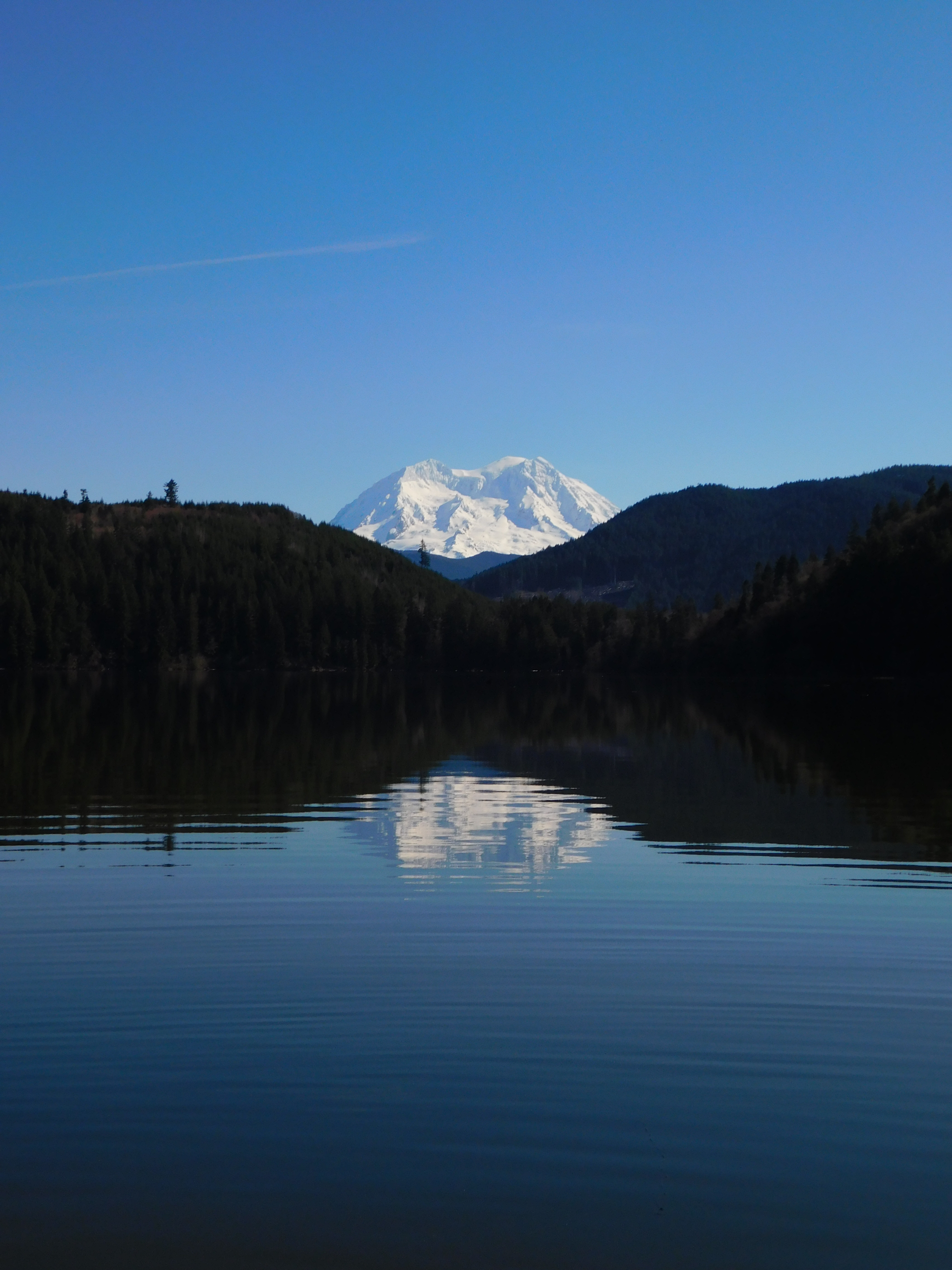
Mineral Lake, 2026

Over 500 acres (200 ha) were purchased by the YMCA of Greater Seattle in 2021, with support from the Nisqually Indian Tribe, to create a campground north of Mineral on the lake. The land was originally part of the Nisqually people's dominion which was yielded in the 1854 Treaty of Medicine Creek. Plans included acquisition of up to 1,600 acres (650 ha) acres in several phases over forthcoming decades. Members of the Mineral community were overwhelmingly against the campground.

After several community meetings, environmental studies, and local endorsements, a rezoning of the area was denied by the Lewis County commissioners in November 2022. The land was zoned as a forest resource. The YMCA proceeded with a lawsuit against the county in December. Despite the veto of the "master planned resort", the YMCA completed their timetable to purchase 1,600 additional acres two months later in early 2022. The larger tract adjoins the original land purchase and the YMCA proposed that the parcel remain as a "working forest".

Follow-up community meetings and a county commissioner revote in early 2023 remained against the zoning for the campground. A judgment from the Thurston County Superior Court in January 2024 reversed the commissioner's decision. The ruling, citing that the commissioner's decline was based on bias, racial animus, and infringement of free speech, required that the original master plan be approved within 30 days. The commissioner board formally accepted the YMCA plan two weeks later, under protest, while mentioning the continuing causes of concern, especially for law enforcement coverage in and around the Mineral area.

== Geography ==
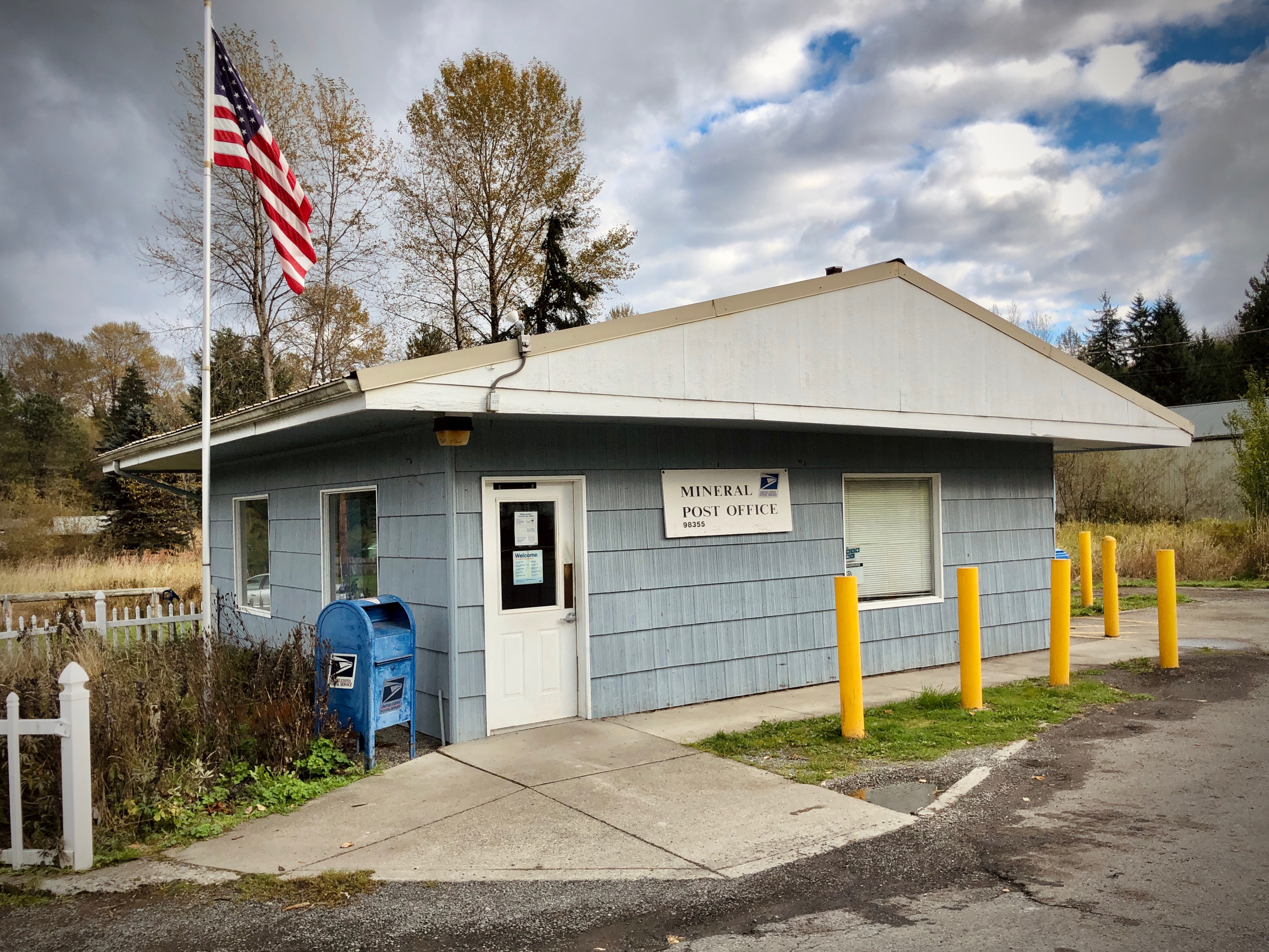
Mineral Post Office, 2020

Mineral is in northeastern Lewis County, 3 miles (5 km) south of the Pierce County line. The community sits at the southern end of Mineral Lake, 4 miles (6 km) south of Elbe and 12 miles (19 km) north of Morton. It is 1.5 miles (2.4 km) east of State Route 7.

According to the U.S. Census Bureau, the Mineral CDP has an area of 0.66 square miles (1.7 km^{2}), all of it recorded as land. Water from Mineral Lake flows north down Mineral Creek to the Nisqually River, which reaches Puget Sound northeast of Olympia.

Residential lots within the town's core are small in size and rare, limiting expansion. Arsenic is a natural element in the community's water supply, requiring Mineral to drill several wells for safe drinking water.

=== Environment and ecology ===
One of the oldest and tallest specimens of Douglas fir ever recorded in the state, measuring at approximately 393 feet (120 m) tall, is located near Mineral. Known as the Mineral Tree, it was recorded to have a diameter of 15.4 feet (4.7 m) and was 1,020 years old. The fir fell in the winter of 1930 and a section was given to the Wind River Arboretum. As of 2025, the Mineral Tree is officially considered the tallest, as well as one of the largest, Douglas firs in the state.

== Climate ==
This region experiences warm (but not hot) and dry summers, with no average monthly temperatures above 71.6 °F. According to the Köppen Climate Classification system, Mineral has a warm-summer Mediterranean climate, abbreviated "Csb" on climate maps.

== Demographics ==
Historical population
Census	Pop.	Note	%±
2010	202		—
2020	193		−4.5%
U.S. Decennial Census; 2000 2010

Mineral first appeared as a census designated place in the 2010 U.S. census. The population was reported as approximately 400 people in 2005 and 193 at the 2020 census, down from 202 at the 2010 census.

=== Racial and ethnic composition ===
Mineral CDP, Washington – Racial and ethnic composition Note: the US Census treats Hispanic/Latino as an ethnic category. This table excludes Latinos from the racial categories and assigns them to a separate category. Hispanics/Latinos may be of any race.
Race / Ethnicity (NH = Non-Hispanic)	Pop 2010	Pop 2020	% 2010	% 2020
White alone (NH)	197	178	97.52%	92.23%
Black or African American alone (NH)	1	0	0.50%	0.00%
Native American or Alaska Native alone (NH)	3	6	1.49%	3.11%
Asian alone (NH)	0	0	0.00%	0.00%
Native Hawaiian or Pacific Islander alone (NH)	1	0	0.50%	0.00%
Other race alone (NH)	0	0	0.00%	0.00%
Mixed race or Multiracial (NH)	0	8	0.00%	4.15%
Hispanic or Latino (any race)	0	1	0.00%	0.52%
Total	202	193	100.00%	100.00%

== Arts and culture ==
=== Historic buildings and sites ===
The Mineral Log Lodge, built in 1906, was listed to the National Register of Historic Places in 1975. Near the lodge is the original Mineral Post Office. The 64-square-foot (5.9 m^{2}) structure was built in 1898 and was once considered the smallest post office in the United States.

=== Tourism ===
Mt. Rainier Scenic Railroad is a heritage railway that runs from Elbe to Mineral and is operated with steam locomotives and historic cars. The route leads through forests, crosses the Nisqually River and ends at the Mt. Rainier Railroad and Logging Museum in Mineral.

The community, usually small in population, can triple or even exceed 3,000 people on the opening weekend of Washington's fishing season due to the influx of anglers. The Mineral Lake Fishing Derby is held annually at the lake; the 33rd event was held in 2026 with proceeds going to several programs led by a local Lions Club.

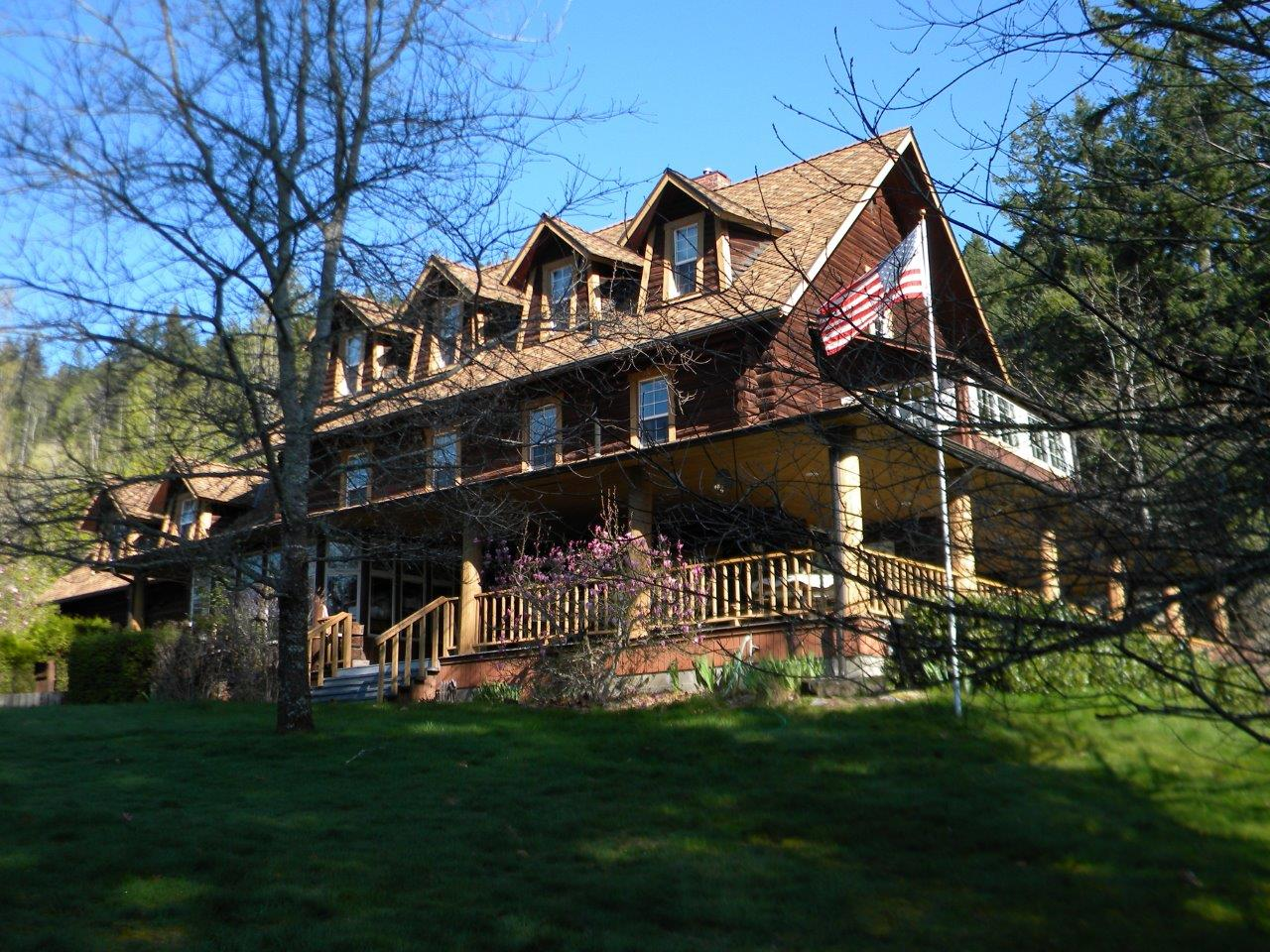
Mineral Log Lodge, 2015

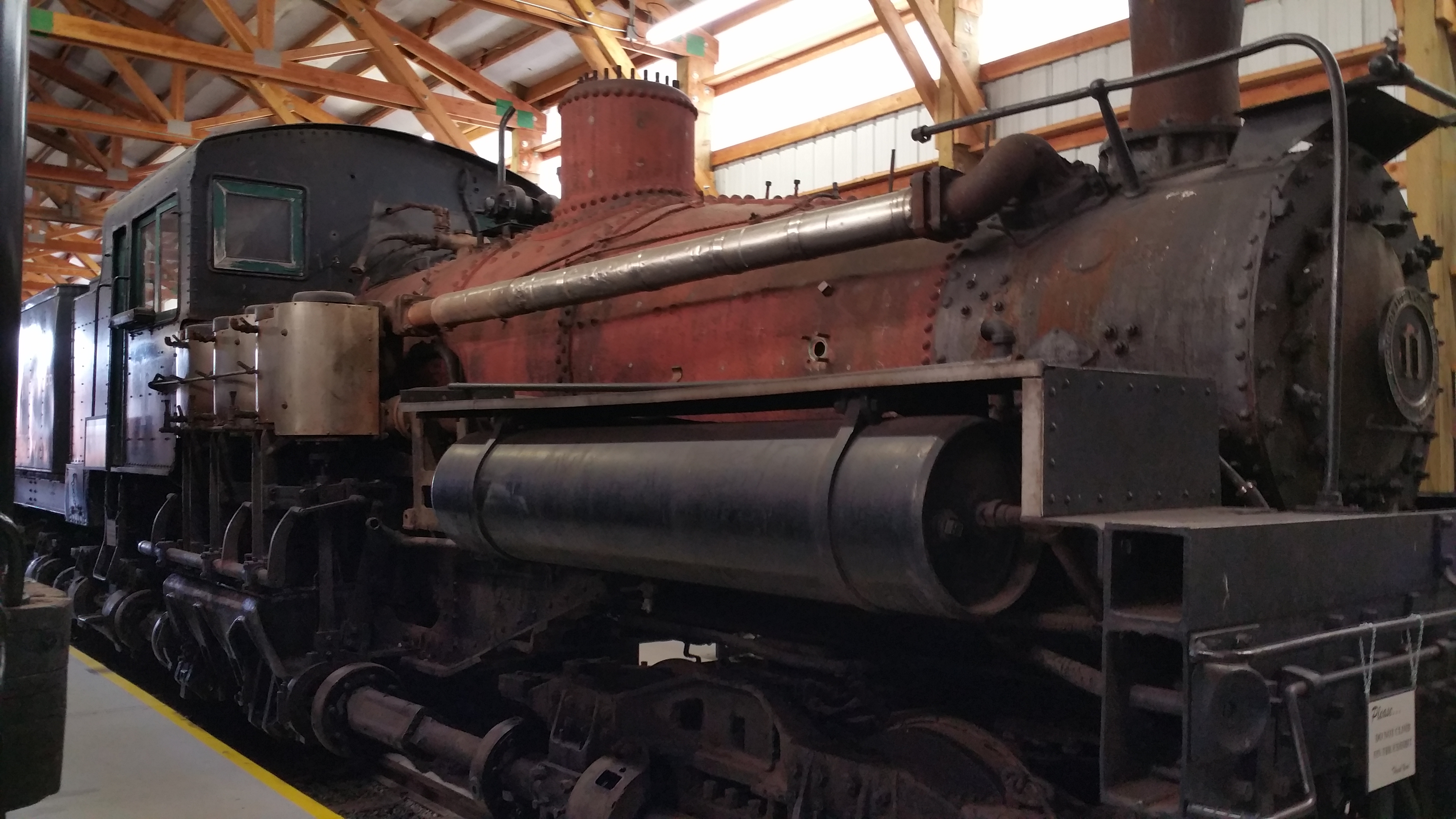
Shay locomotive No. 11, Mount Rainier Railroad and Logging Museum, 2016

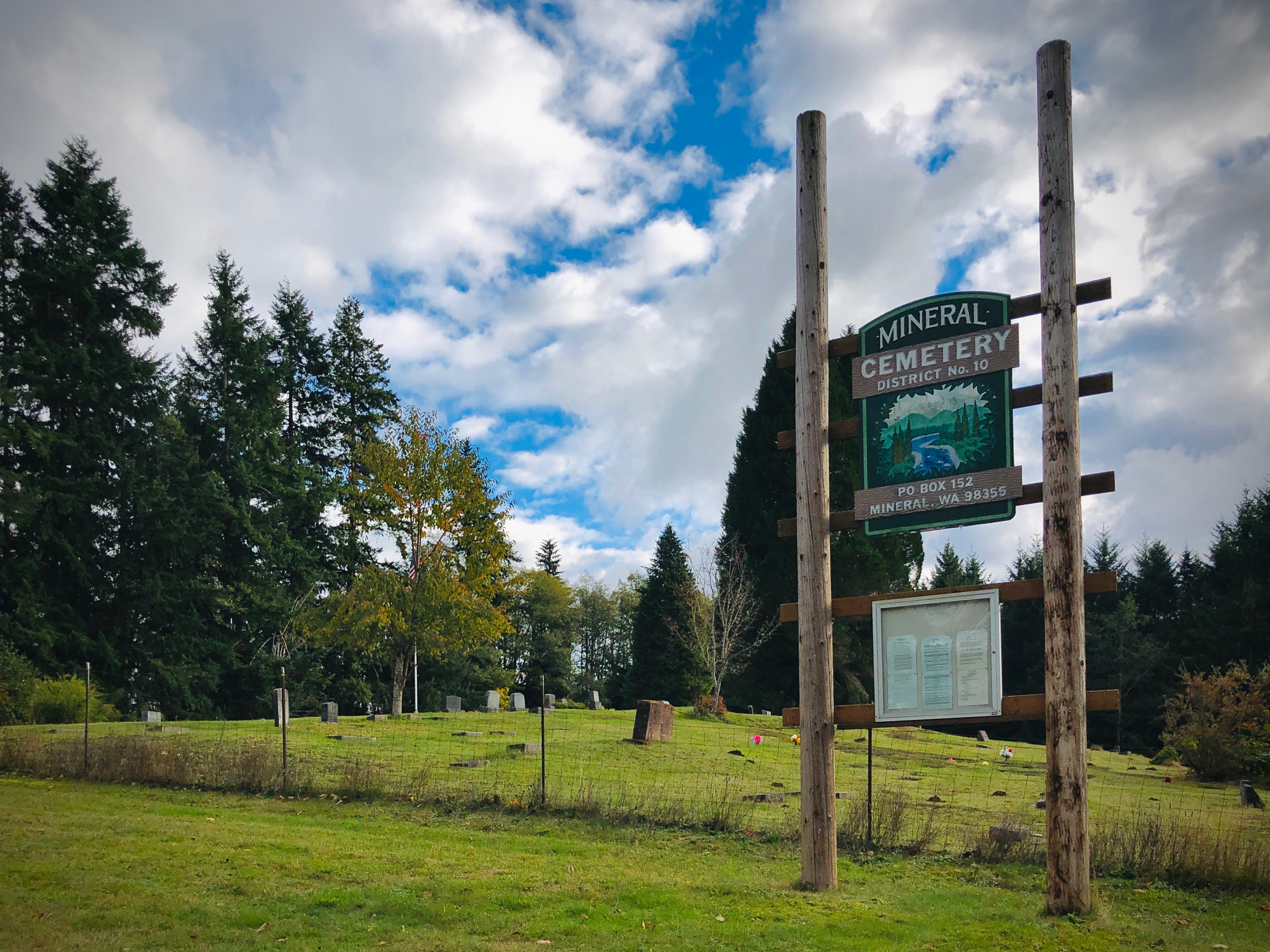
Mineral Cemetery, 2020

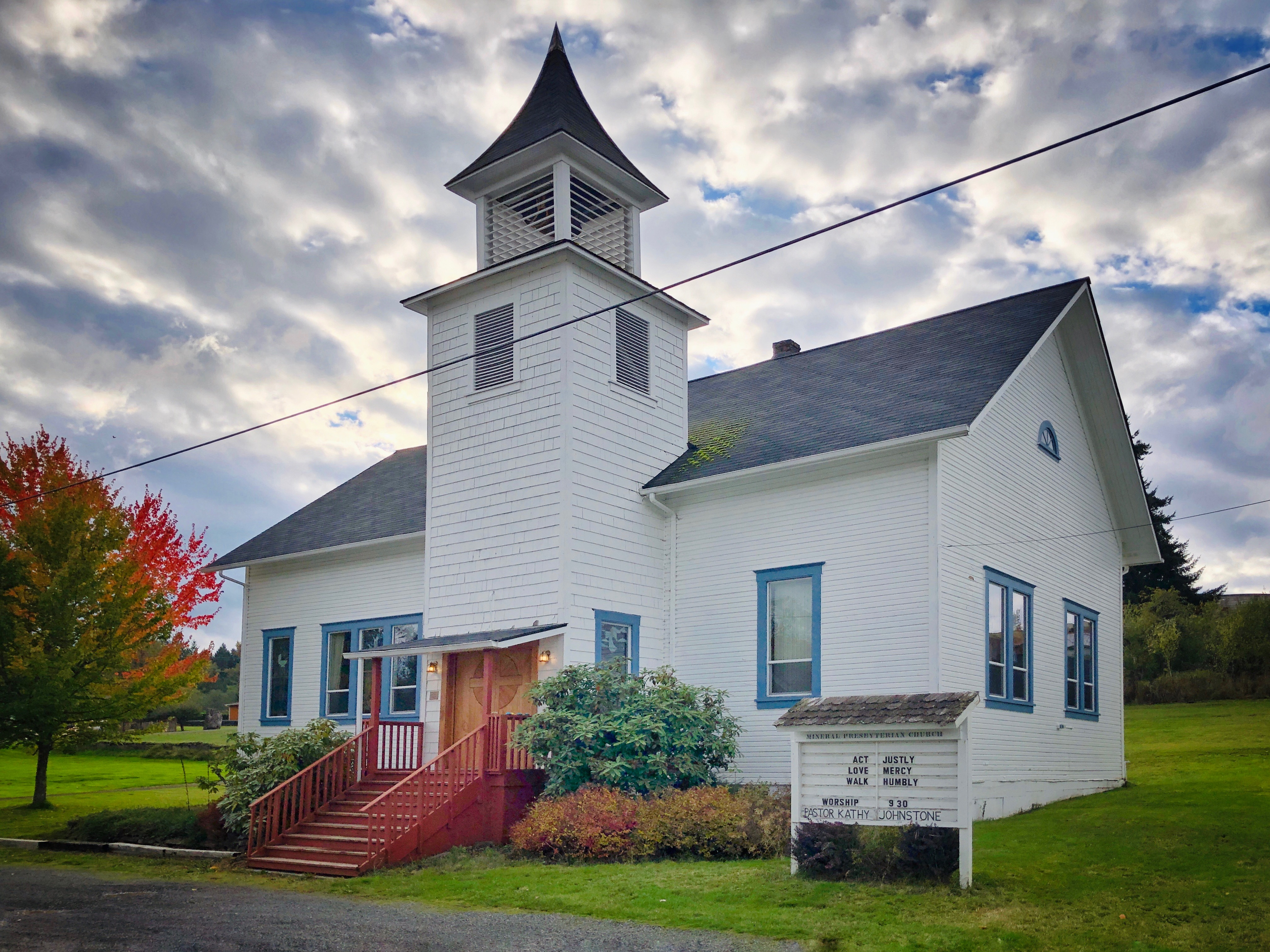
Mineral Presbyterian Church, 2020

== Parks and recreation ==
Mineral affords views of Mount Rainier. Mineral is most noted as a fishing destination. The lake is stocked yearly with rainbow trout and other fish species. The local catch-phrase is "Mineral Lake, home of the 10 pound trout."

== Education ==
The first school in Mineral was held at a miner's cabin approximately in 1895. A schoolhouse was built in 1900, providing education for students between 6 and 16 years old. The first class listed 10 students.

The Mineral Elementary School, opened in 1944 as a replacement for a previous school that burned down, closed in 2003. The 18,000-square-foot (1,700 m^{2}) schoolhouse, which contained two auditoriums, was sold in 2006.

Students in the community are overseen by the Morton School District.

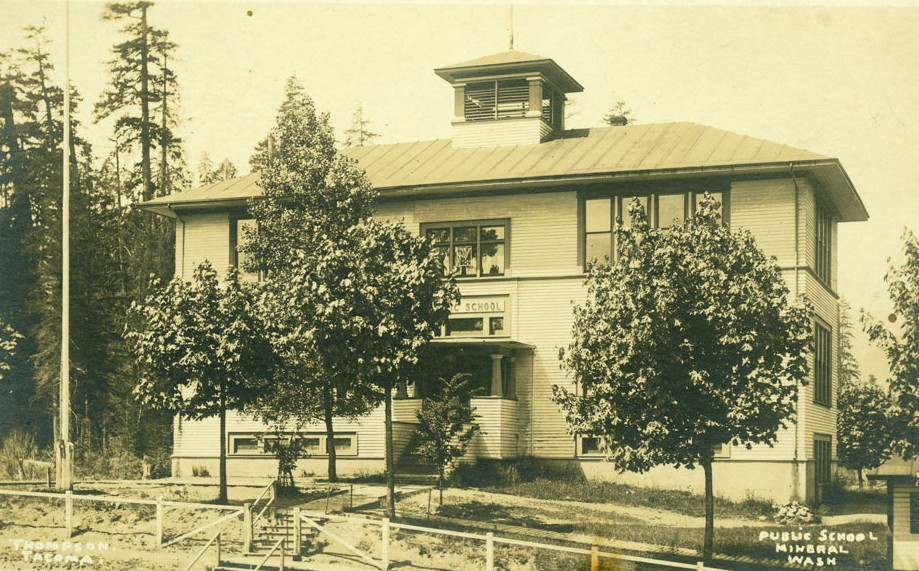
Mineral School, ca. 1919

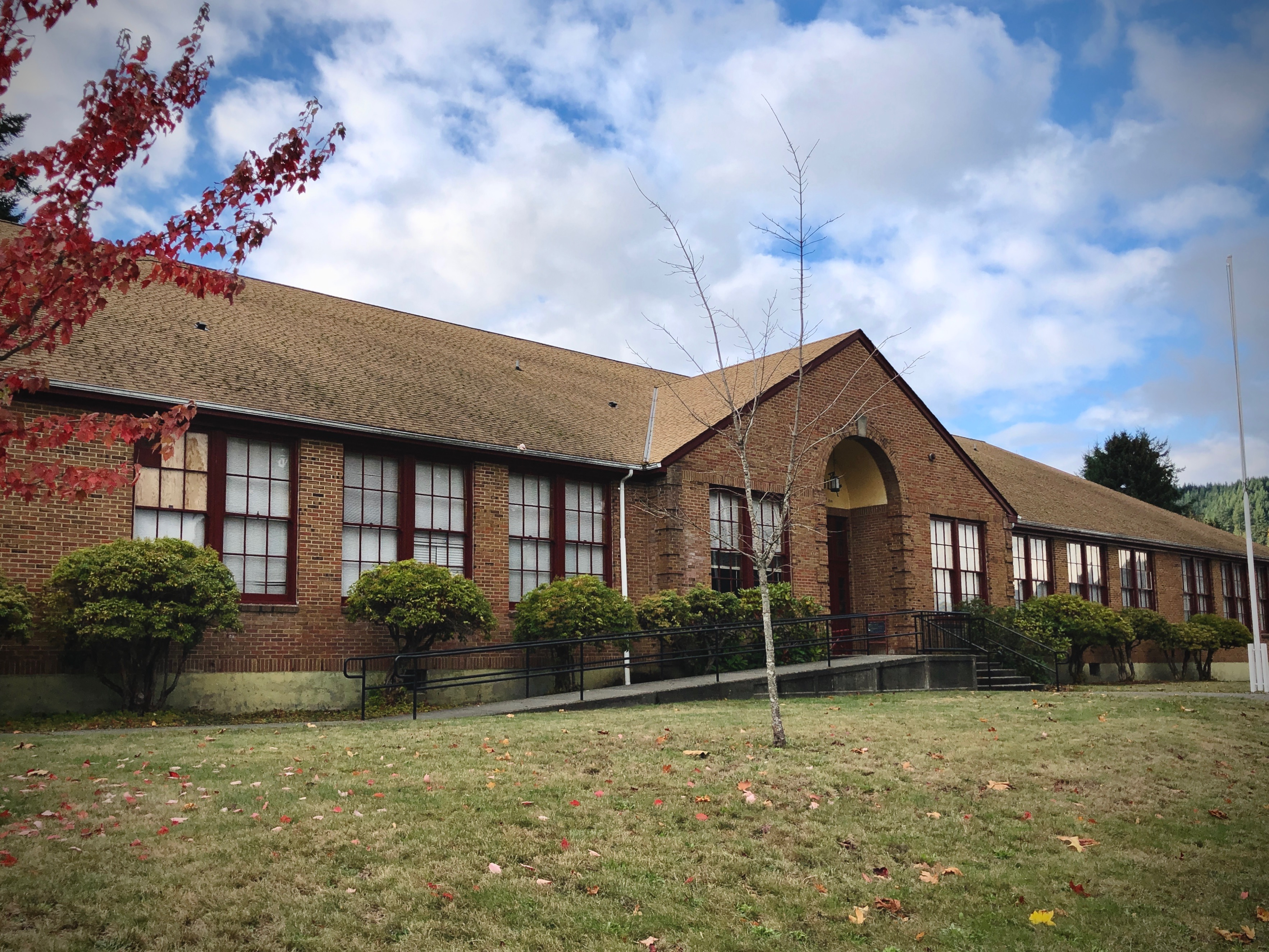
Mineral School, 2020

== Government and politics ==
Presidential Elections Results
Year	Republican	Democratic	Third parties
2008	53.2% 175	44.4% 146	2.4% 8
2012	58.1% 187	37.9% 122	4.0% 13
2016	64.0% 194	28.1% 85	7.9% 24
2020	64.9% 281	32.6% 141	4.0% 11
2024	68.3% 297	30.1% 131	1.6% 7

=== Politics ===
As Mineral is an unincorporated community, there are no defined bounds and the precinct may be incongruous with the census boundaries.

The 2020 election included 6 votes for candidates of the Libertarian Party and 2 votes for write-in candidates. In the 2024 election, there was one vote cast for Robert F. Kennedy Jr..

== Infrastructure ==
A 180 foot (55 metres), steel truss bridge spanning over Mineral Creek that was erected in 1918 was replaced by 2005. Approximately 80% of the newer bridge's cost of $2.2 million was covered under a federal grant.

The first EV charging station in the community was constructed and installed behind the Mineral Lake Market in 2026 under direction of the Lewis County Public Utility District. Opened in May, the two-station, Mineral Mobility Hub was funded by state grants and via several groups and agencies, including the Economic Alliance of Lewis County and Lewis County Transit.

== Notable people ==
- Pearl Thrasher, former member of the Washington House of Representatives (1945–1947)
