= Mt. Rainier Scenic Railroad 5 =

Preserved American 2-8-2 locomotive

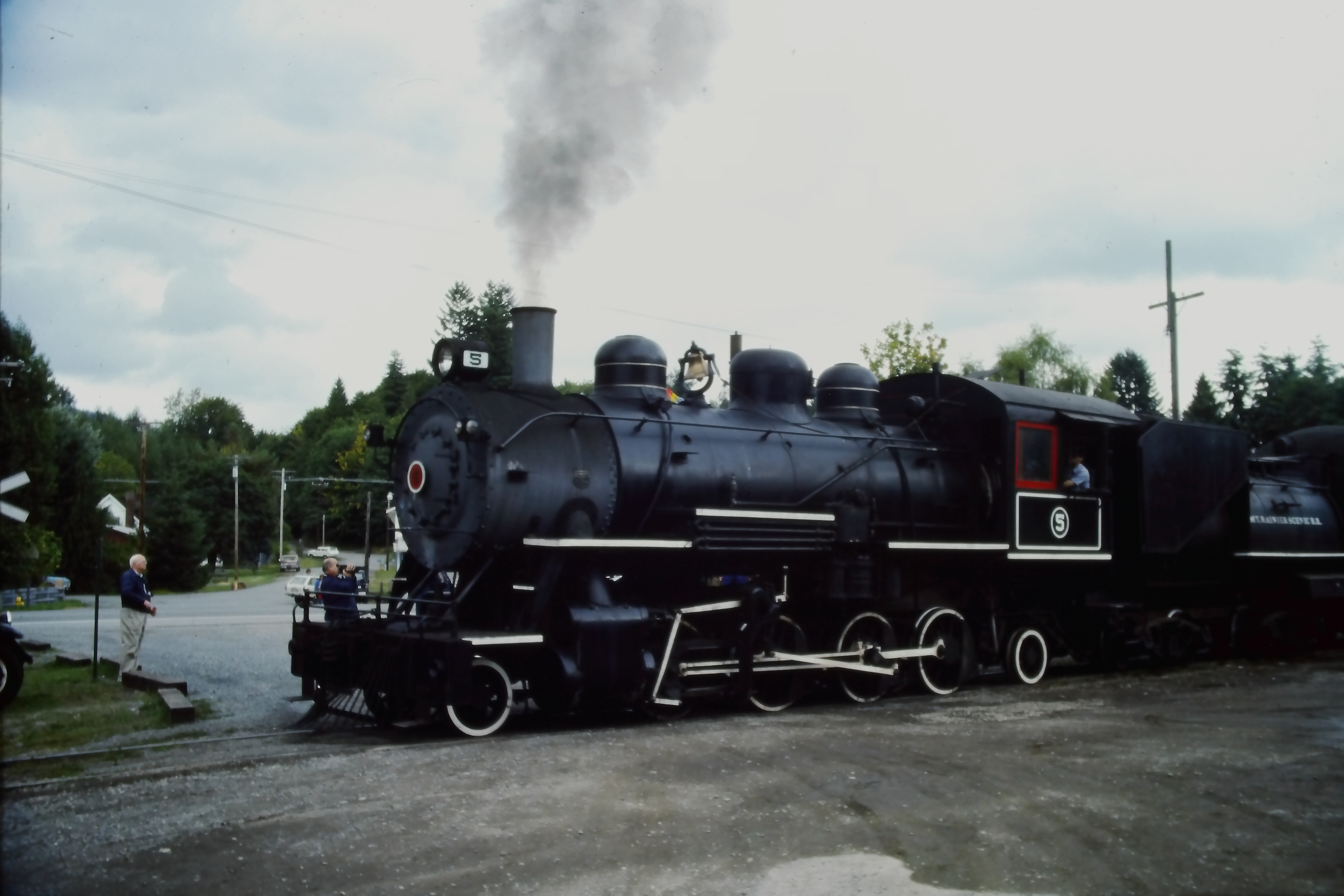
- No. 5 in Elbe, Washington in 1989
Type and origin
- Power type: Steam
- Builder: H.K. Porter, Inc.
- Serial number: 6860
- Build date: February 1924
Specifications
- Configuration
  - Whyte: 2-8-2
- Gauge: 4 ft 8 1/2 in (1,435 mm)
- Driver dia.: 45 in (1.143 m)
- Loco weight: 140,000 lb (63.5 t)
- Fuel type: Oil
- Boiler pressure: 200 psi (1.38 MPa)
- Cylinders: Two, outside
- Cylinder size: 18 in × 24 in (457 mm × 610 mm)
Performance figures
- Tractive effort: 26,435 lbf (117.6 kN)
Career
- Operators: Carlton and Coast Railroad; Port of Grays Harbor; Schafer Brothers; Mount Rainier Scenic Railroad
- Numbers: CCR 5; PoGH 5; MRSR 5
- Retired: 1959 (revenue service); 2003 (1st excursion service)
- Restored: 1986 (1st excursion service)
- Current owner: Mount Rainier Scenic Railroad
- Disposition: Undergoing restoration to operating condition

Mt. Rainier Scenic Railroad 5 is a preserved 2-8-2 "Mikado" type steam locomotive owned by the Mount Rainier Scenic Railroad, located in Elbe, Washington. The engine is currently owned and undergoing restoration by the Western Forest Industries Museum (WFIM), which operates the MRSR. Constructed in February 1924 by the H.K. Porter Company of Pittsburgh, Pennsylvania, the engine holds significant historical standing as one of the largest tender-type locomotives ever manufactured by Porter.

Originally built for the heavy logging demands of the Pacific Northwest, No. 5 survived two major periods of scrap liquidation—World War II and the widespread dieselization of the 1950s. No. 5 was acquired by the Mt. Rainier Scenic Railroad in the early 1980s for excursion service. For over two decades, the locomotive served as the railroad's primary locomotive. No. 5 was taken out of service in the early 2000s for an overhaul. Following the MRSR's reorganization in 2023, the engine is undergoing a comprehensive mechanical rebuild, with a planned return to service in the next few years to enable expanded capacity and operations.

== History ==
=== Background ===
Historically, Porter was renowned for producing rugged, small industrial steam locomotives, particularly saddle tank engines utilized in early Northwest logging operations. However, by the 1920s, logging operations had expanded dramatically, necessitating the deployment of much larger, more powerful locomotives capable of hauling longer and heavier trains over increased distances.

Porter entered the market for tender-type engines, competing directly with industry giants such as Baldwin Locomotive Works and American Locomotive Company. The 70-ton Mikado design, delivering over 26,000 lbs of tractive effort, placed No. 5 squarely in the heavy industrial freight hauler category. The very existence of this locomotive demonstrates that logging railroads in the Pacific Northwest had matured past light industrial tracks, requiring equipment that could meet the performance and endurance standards previously reserved for secondary mainline freight service.

=== Revenue service ===
==== Carlton and Coast Railroad ====
No. 5 was built in February 1924 as Carlton and Coast Railroad No. 55, and was originally commissioned by the Flora Logging Company for use on its subsidiary. The railroad operated out of Carlton, Oregon, and ran from its Southern Pacific interchange to Tillamook, Oregon. The engine was designed for logging trains, but was more than adequate to operate heavier trains if needed. No. 55 operated for the C&C from 1924 to 1940, when the railroad was shut down after a series of forest fires devastated the areas around Tillamook, in what became known as the Tillamook Burn. This era coincided with the burgeoning need for scrap metal during the onset of American involvement in World War II. It was common practice for abandoned railroads and surplus industrial equipment to be liquidated for the war effort. However, No. 5 was sold off for continued commercial use, making it the only surviving locomotive known from the Carlton & Coast Railroad.

==== Port of Grays Harbor ====
Following its retirement from logging service, the locomotive was acquired by the Port of Grays Harbor in Hoquiam, Washington. At the port, the 2-8-2 was repurposed as a heavy switcher, utilizing its excellent tractive effort and relatively small 45-inch drivers for yard work. During this period, its numbering was officially changed to No. 5. The locomotive remained in service at the Hoquiam docks until 1959, when the Port finalized its transition to modern diesel motive power and put the steam engine up for sale.

=== Preservation ===
==== Acquisition by the Schafer Brothers ====
In 1959, No. 5 was purchased by the Schafer Brothers, a prominent logging family based in Brady, Washington. Carl Schafer led the acquisition, driven by personal sentiment. The family's own substantial logging fleet, which had once included over a dozen steam engines, was scrapped during the 1950s. Carl Schafer had a particular fondness for Schafer Brothers Engine No. 4 (a 2-6-2), and he recognized the Port of Grays Harbor No. 5 as a "near twin". The engine was not purchased for operational use but rather for long-term display. It was moved to the Schafer Brothers’ private game farm near Montesano, Washington, where it was placed on static display.

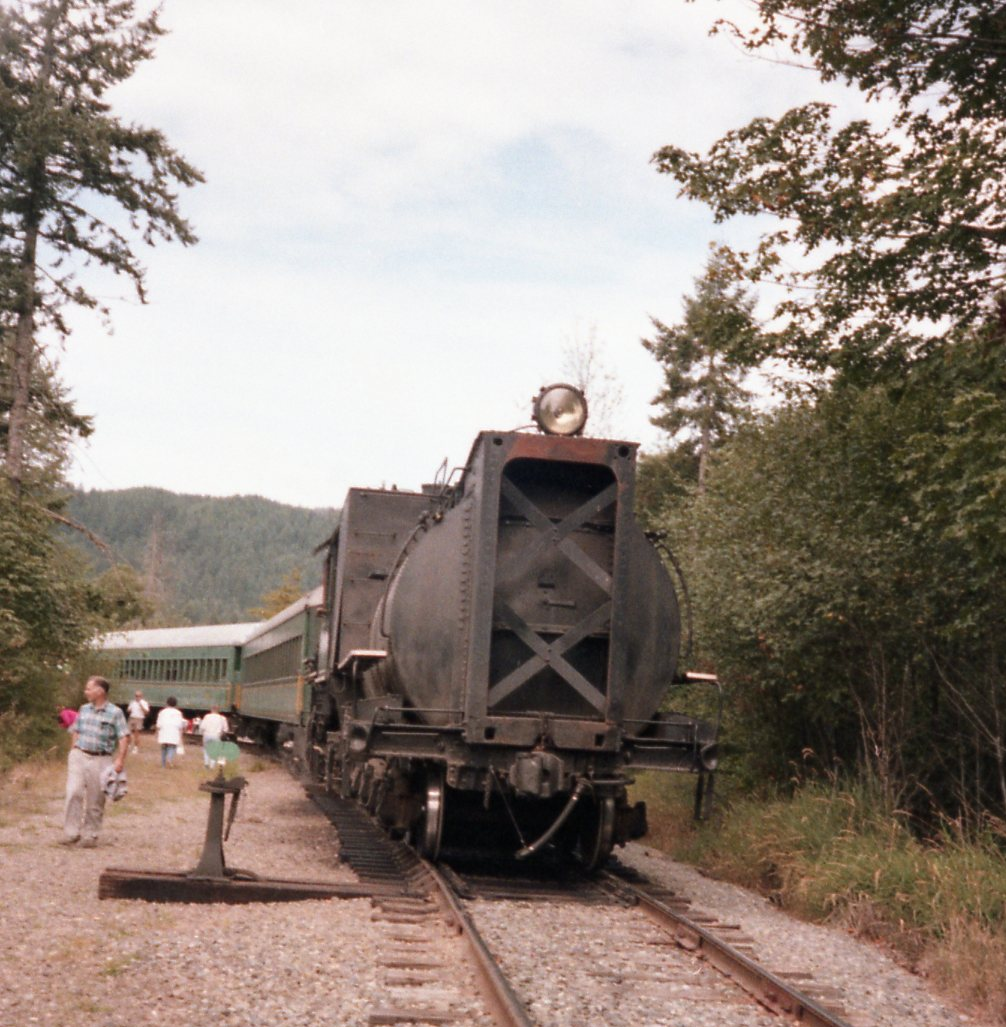
No.5 loading passengers in the 1990s

==== Mt. Rainier Scenic Railroad ====
When the Mt. Rainier Scenic Railroad acquired the locomotive in the early 1980s as a candidate for operational restoration, the full extent of the deterioration became apparent. During the initial restoration attempts, the original tender was sent for sandblasting, only to disintegrate completely due to structural corrosion. The locomotive body itself was noted to be only in "marginally better condition". The severe mechanical deterioration resulting from the period of static display forced the preservation team to execute a complex salvage and reconstruction project rather than a routine overhaul. A replacement Vanderbilt-style tender had to be sourced and acquired from the Northwestern Pacific Railroad in California and subsequently fitted to the engine.

Once restored, the Mikado's inherent power and durability, originally designed for heavy logging, translated perfectly into tourist service. No. 5 was powerful enough to pull long passenger trains considerable distances over the MRSR's route, securing its role as the railroad's main workhorse for over two decades. The locomotive operated in tourist service for a duration comparable to its combined industrial career in logging and freight switching. The engine last operated in the 2003, and was taken out of service after some mechanical faults demanded that engine be sidelined.

==== 2024 restoration ====
After the MRSR was sold by American Heritage Railways, the Western Forest Industries Museum (WFIM), was looking at locomotives to restore for their new non profit. On May 8, 2024, WFIM formally announced an ambitious undertaking to restore Porter No. 5 to operational status. This comprehensive restoration project is a major mechanical effort necessary after decades of continuous operation and subsequent mothballing. The scope of work includes a complete boiler restoration, the replacement of worn tires, and a significant rebuild of the running and driving gear.

The total estimated budget for the comprehensive mechanical work is $549,500, with the organization actively seeking to raise $318,125 from enthusiasts and community supporters to finalize the remaining restoration components. The projected timeline for completion and return to operational service is 2025. Executive Director Bethan Maher emphasized that the restoration is a "crucial milestone" tied directly to the organization's dual missions of historic preservation and positive local economic impact. The MRSR reported an update regarding the aftermath of an arson attack on April 30, 2025, that destroyed the railroad's largest trestle, which temporarily impacts the line's integrity and long-term operating plans.

== See also ==
- Polson Logging Co. 2
- Port of Grays Harbor
- Northwestern Pacific Railroad
- Mount Rainier Scenic Railroad
- Tillamook Burn
