= Mineral Log Lodge =

Historic landmark in Mineral, Washington

- U.S. National Register of Historic Places
- Washington State Heritage Register
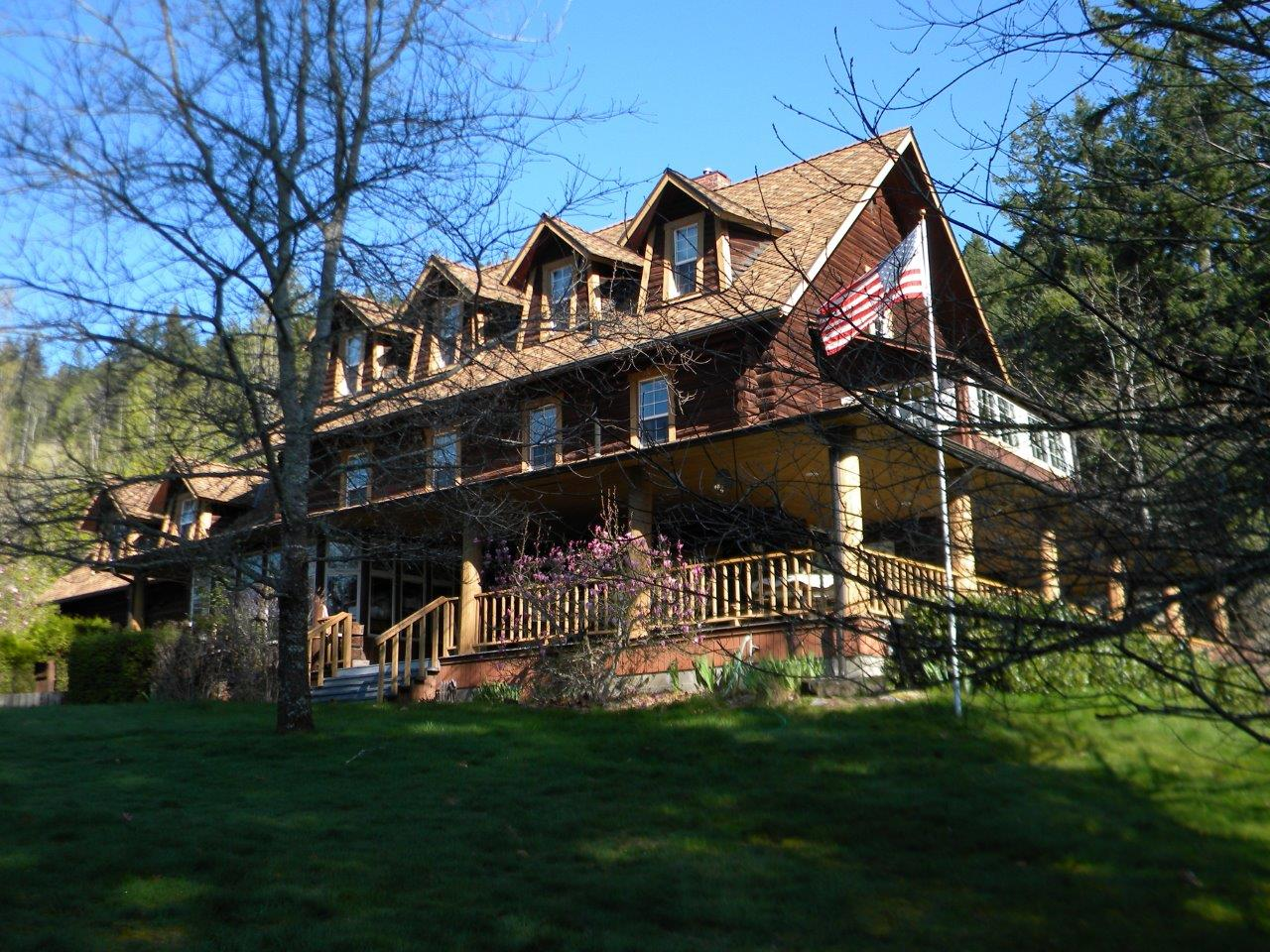
- Mineral Log Lodge, 2015

- Location within Washington (state)
- Location: Western shoreline of Mineral Lake on Hill Road, Mineral, Washington
- Coordinates: 46°43′20″N 122°10′52″W
- Area: less than one acre
- Built: 1906
- Built by: Mr. Gilfellin
- Architectural style: Log building
- NRHP reference No.: 75001862

Significant dates
- Added to NRHP: March 26, 1975
- Designated WSHR: March 26, 1975

The Mineral Log Lodge is a historic lodge located in Mineral, Washington. The landmark was added to the National Register of Historic Places (NRHP) in 1975.

Known originally as the Mineral Lake Inn, the log cabin lodge was constructed in 1906 out of solid timber. Initially the inn was to be of use as a retreat for wealthy citizens from Seattle and Tacoma. However, the lodge was not a successful venture at its beginnings due to difficulties in reaching the rural inn. Coupled with losses to Mineral's economy and population during the 1910s and into the 1920s, ownership, in order to increase business, turned to activities such as alcohol and gambling which were considered legally and morally unacceptable at the time. The inn was often raided by law enforcement.

The lodge changed ownership several times afterwards, becoming a sanatorium for a brief time and later used for corporate or employee retreats for logging companies. The venue was used to entertain business and political dignitaries in the state in the mid-20th century but eventually fell out of use, becoming a private residence for decades as a house for caretakers. By the early 2000s, the lodge was reopened as a bed-and-breakfast.

The Mineral Log lodge, noted also for its dormers, an attached, matching kitchen building, and views of Mount Rainier, is considered to be in a mostly unaltered state, surviving in good condition with a large amount of original craftsmanship remaining during its lifetime.

== History ==
The land around Mineral Lake was settled by Scandinavian families around the 1880s and 1890s. An adjoining parcel to what was to become the location of the Mineral Log Lodge was originally a stopping point for weary pioneer travelers before a homestead cabin and barn was erected. The structures are one of the earliest remaining settlement buildings in the region.

The lodge, originally known as the Mineral Lake Inn, was built under order of a Mr. Gilfellin in 1906. The building was constructed by local Scandinavian people in and around Mineral, known for old world craftsmanship.

The inn was initially targeted to prominent, affluent people from the metropolitan areas around Puget Sound as a retreat for health and wellness or for wilderness activities. Hunting, due to the geographic nature of the area, could be done throughout the year. Vacationers traveled by train to Elbe, completing the journey to the inn by horse and buggy.

The first event of note was a gathering of the Washington State Press Association in August 1906. It was the first time the organization held an event in Lewis County. Although the inn became known as Mineral's main attraction. and despite the early press association event, the lodge was not an immediate business success due to its location and difficulty in travel to reach the destination. The town's fortune began to wane, with economic conditions and population decreasing. Mine and timber production began to diminish. The community's major employer, the Mineral Lake Lumber Company's mill, was lost to fire in 1920, ending Mineral's peak years.

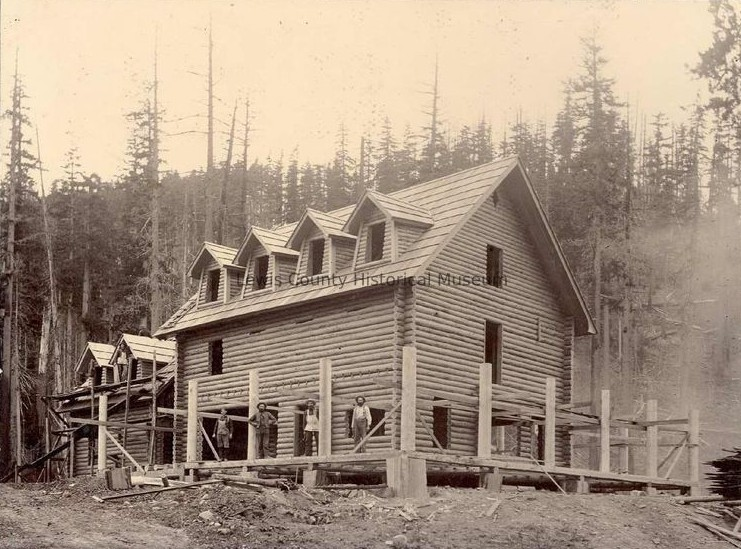
Construction of Mineral Log Lodge, 1906

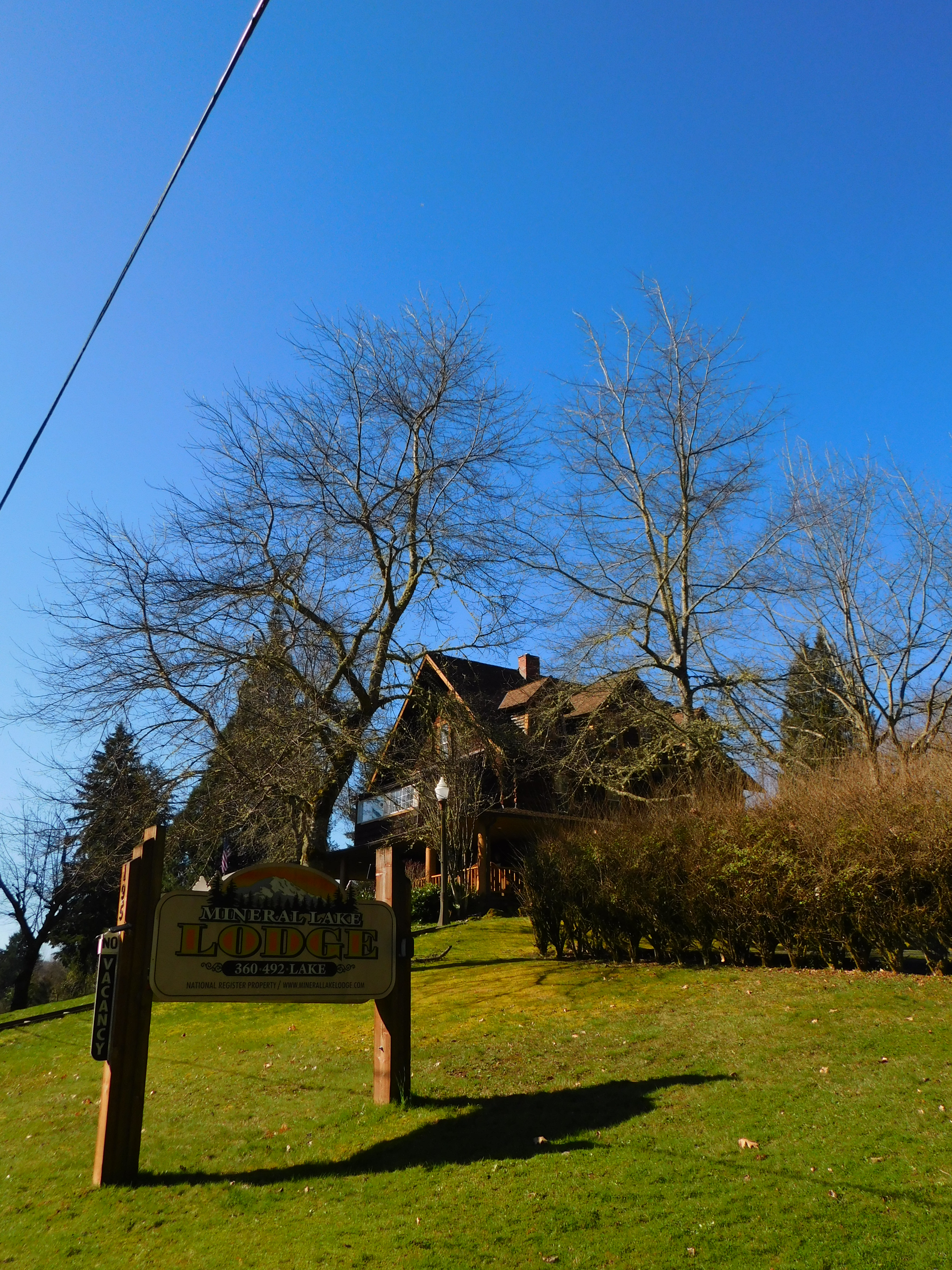
Exterior, 2026

To increase business, Gilfellin opened the inn to more risqué opportunities of the time, including alcohol, gambling, and a vague description of "other vices". The venture helped to attract local men in the mining and timber industry, but the lodge was raided by law enforcement consistently. During this time of vice, ownership changed often. In early 1926, (Note: Though an official date is lacking on the Ruby purchase in 1926, articles begin reporting the sale in May of that year, mentioning the timeframe as "recent" or "weeks ago".) the grounds were purchased by the Ruby family for use as the Mineral Lake Sanatorium, a wellness retreat for those suffering from a wide range of maladies, including alcoholism, epilepsy, and those considered "mildly insane". (Note: The NRHP nomination form refers to Mr. Ruby as a "quack doctor".) Weyerhaeuser bought the inn afterwards, converting it for use as a hunting lodge for corporate officials and guests. Since Weyerhaeuser did not log in the nearby vicinity, the lodge remained mostly unused.

By the 1940s, the site became under ownership of L.T. Murray Sr. and the West Fork Timber Company, based in Tacoma, as part of a purchase of surrounding timber land. The company's Mineral Lake logging camp used the lodge, which was occupied by the cook. Murray and his company eventually began to use the lodge for meetings with prominent business and political leaders of the time, including Governor Arthur B. Langlie (Note: The NRHP nomination form mentions Washington state governor Arthur P. Langely, who does not exist.) and state senator Harry P. Cain. The building became of use as a residence for certain West Fork employees by the mid-1970s and the logging company retained ownership into the 1980s.

An owner from the late 1980s into the early 2000s attempted to reopen the site as a lodge but was unable to meet certain county and state code requirements. The Sheppard family bought the site in 2002, reopening the inn as an 8-room bed-and-breakfast in August 2004.

=== Mr. Gilfellin ===
Gilfellin's history is mostly unknown and supported by either myth or local legends. He was said to be vaguely from the "east" and was an investor, possibly the son of one of the early manufacturers of radios. A local story states Gilfellin married a countess from Austria and moved to Argentina. Whether he left of his own will, or by fear of the law, is not known.

== Geography ==
The Mineral Log Lodge is located off the western shoreline of Mineral Lake on Mineral Hill Road in Mineral, Washington. Due to the inn's proximity to the lake, lodge visitors use a variety of boats to travel on the water and views of Mount Rainier are available from the second story balcony.

At the time of the NRHP nomination in 1975, the lodge was listed as a private residence but open for appointment tours.

== Architecture and features ==
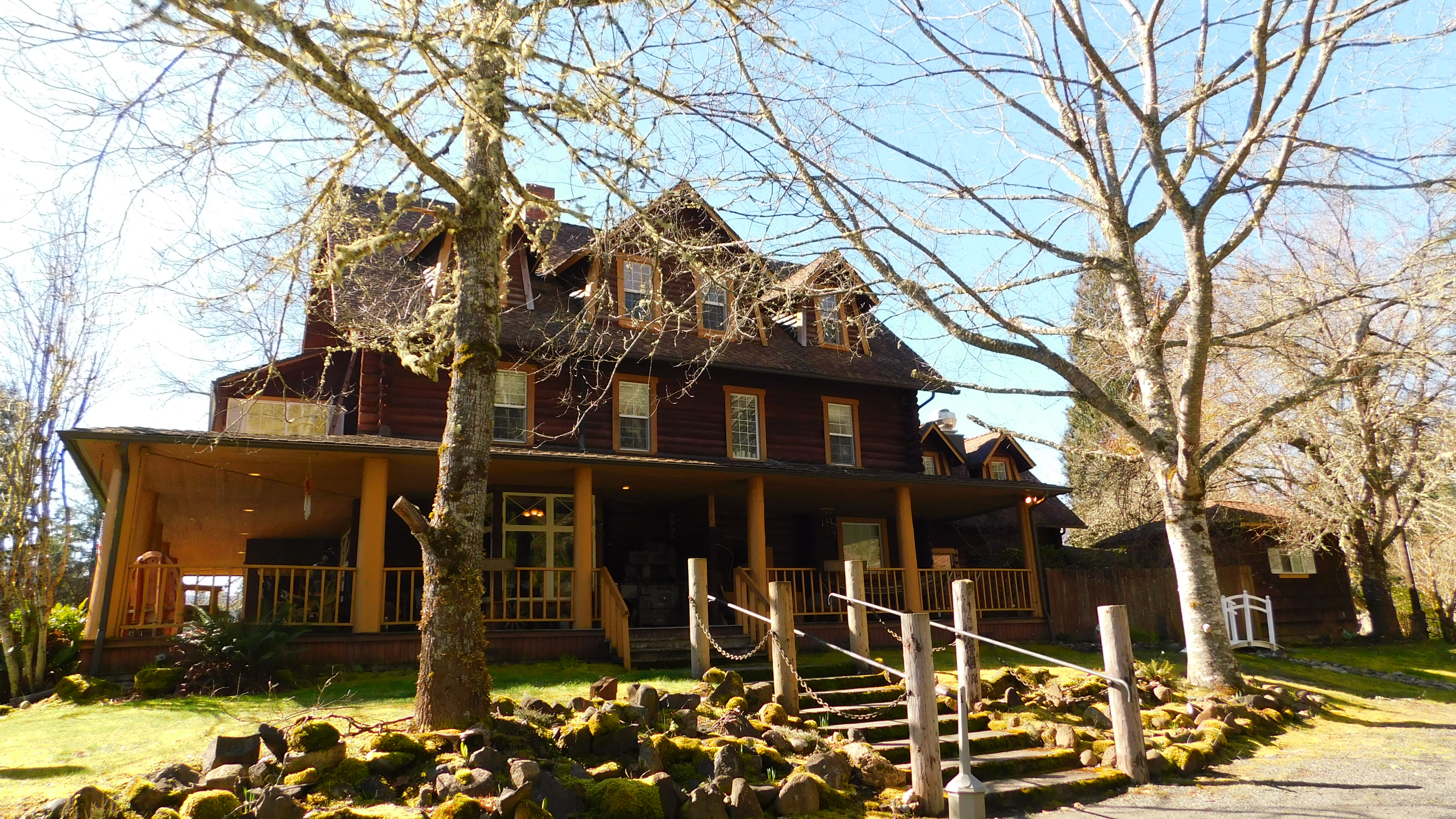
Main entrance, 2026

Unless otherwise noted, the details provided are based on the 1975 National Register of Historic Places nomination form and may not reflect updates or changes to the Mineral Lake Lodge in the interim.

The Mineral Log Lodge is described as either a 2 1/2 or three-story log building that features a near, wrap-around porch. The 4,800-square-foot (450 m^{2}) structure is supported by a post foundation and contains a fireplace and, as of 2006, a sauna. The grounds in the front yard slope towards the lake. At the time of the NRHP nomination, the surrounding portion was mostly cleared within a second-growth forest setting, a similar description to that of the site during the 1926 purchase by the Ruby family.

The overlapping joinery of the logs consist of a precise crosscut forming a semi-cylindrical void, including a necessary 45° angle cut for the interior walls. The projecting ends of the logs on the exterior are a straight crosscut. The timber was noted for being "exceptionally straight and round, with little size variation" and chinking was neatly accomplished with strips of wood, wedge-shaped and narrow.

The NRHP nomination noted that the lodge was "unaltered from its original appearance" and the log walls retained their natural finish. Only additions for plumbing and standard upgrades to the kitchen were the notable exceptions.

=== Exterior ===
The floorplan of the original, main section of the lodge is rectangular. The cedar-shingled gable roof is steeply pitched, with a row of four tapered gable dormers on the front side. The back side also features a row of dormers, the difference being a larger, middle dormer with a taller gable to accommodate the size. Similar to the overall structure, the dormers are built of logs, with cedar moldings covering the corner joinery. Windows on the second floor are matched in placement of the above roofed windows.

Large timber posts support a bottom floor veranda with a hip roof reaching to the bottom window sills of the second floor. A horizontal soffit completes the veranda roof. The porch wraps from the south front of the lodge to the lake-facing, main entrance side on the east, terminating on the building's north side. A large bay window for the dining room exists on the back of the lodge with a smaller bay window for the foyer at the front. The bay windows are continuous and fixed, with above transoms with "X" shaped muntins.

Above the main entrance on the second floor is an enclosed balcony with a shed roof. At the time of the NRHP nomination, it was open, the roof supported by poles with a balustrade.

At the west end of the lodge is an 2 1/2 story addition set flush to the inn and is described as a kitchen space. Though smaller, the structure is considered to be similar in both appearance and layout to the main lodge building, including identical dormers and a matching hip roof porch. The kitchen, when originally built, was unattached to the lodge, suspected for fire safety.

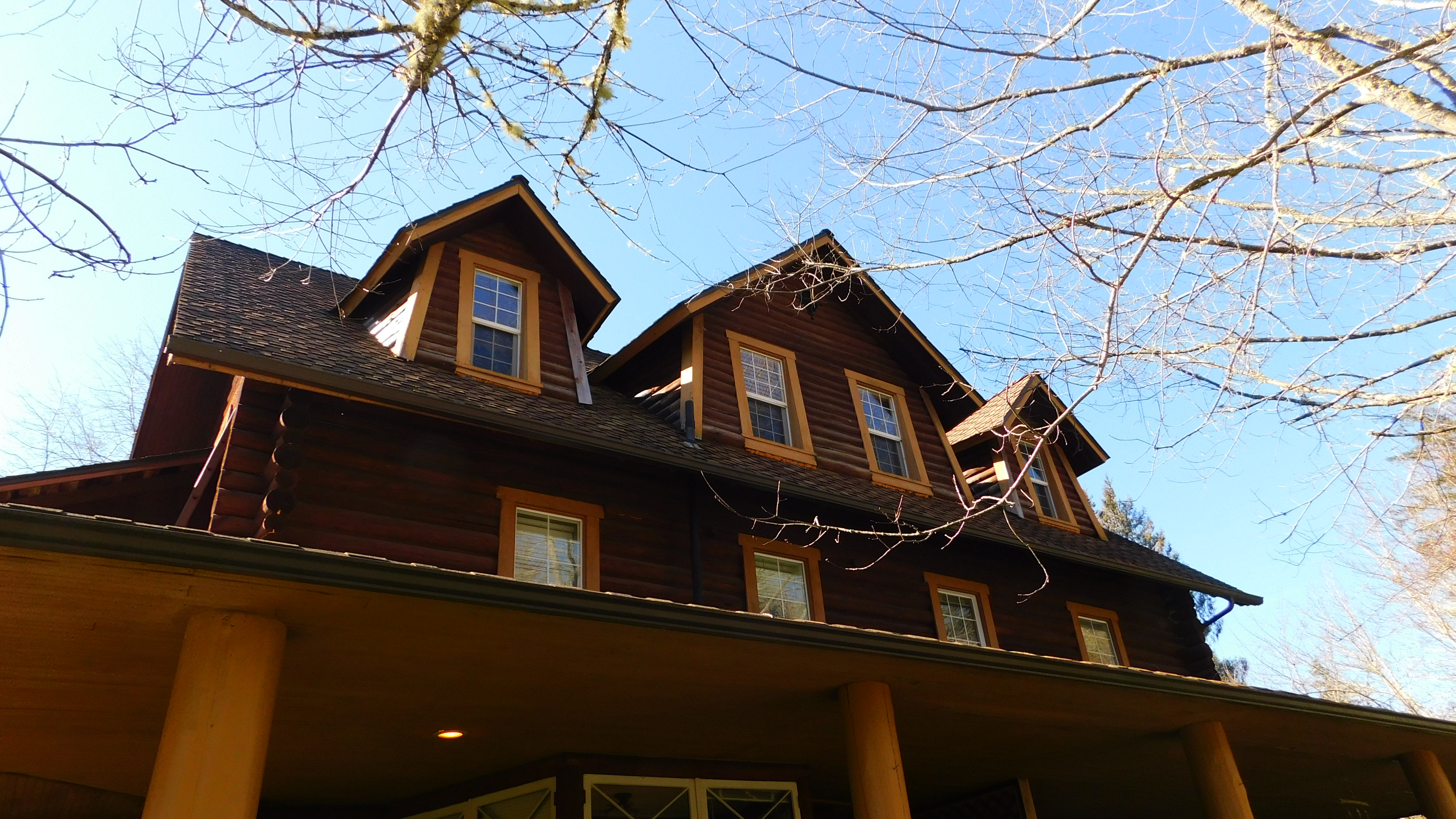
Main entrance exterior, 2026

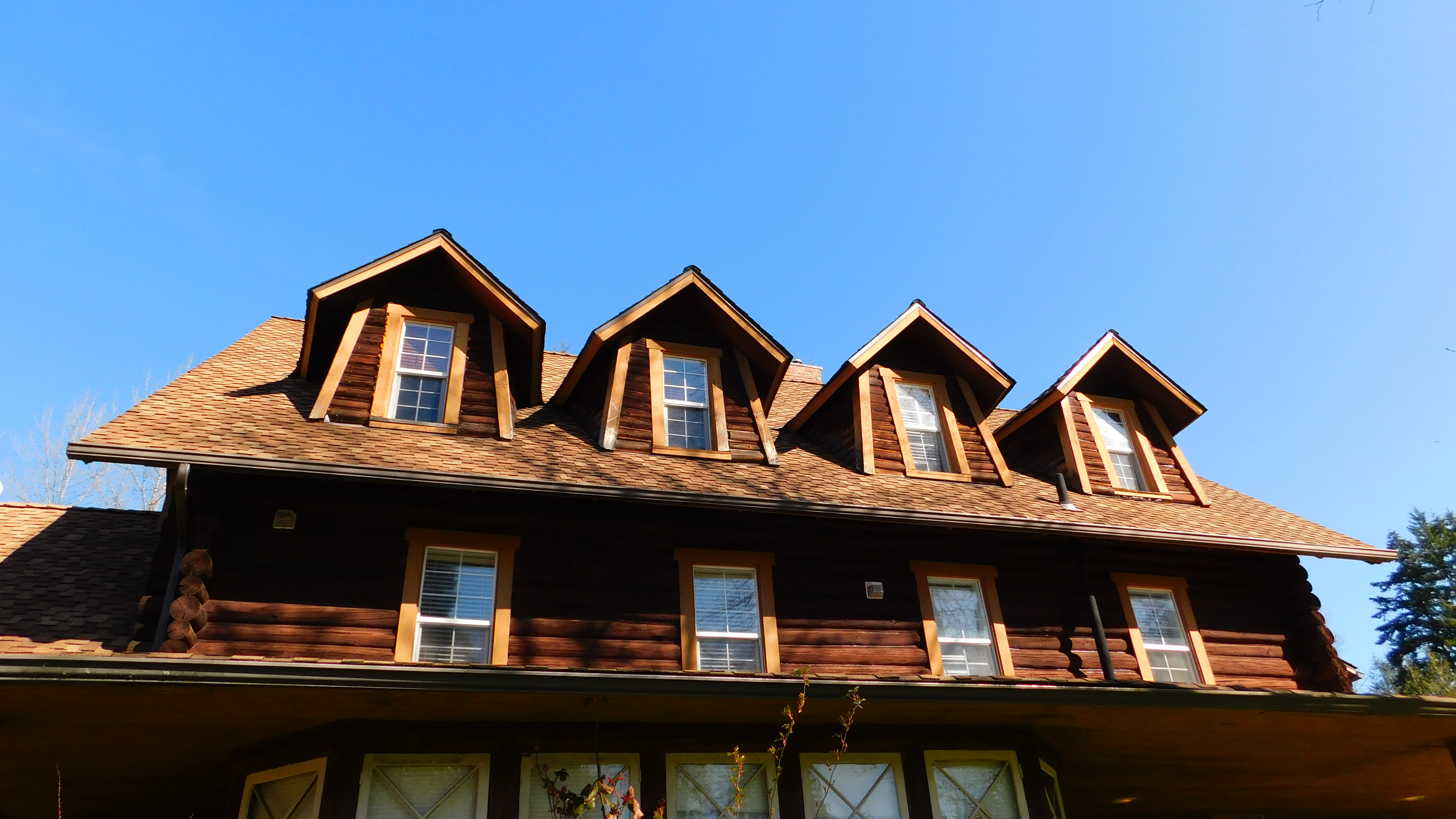
Upper floors and dormers, south view, 2026

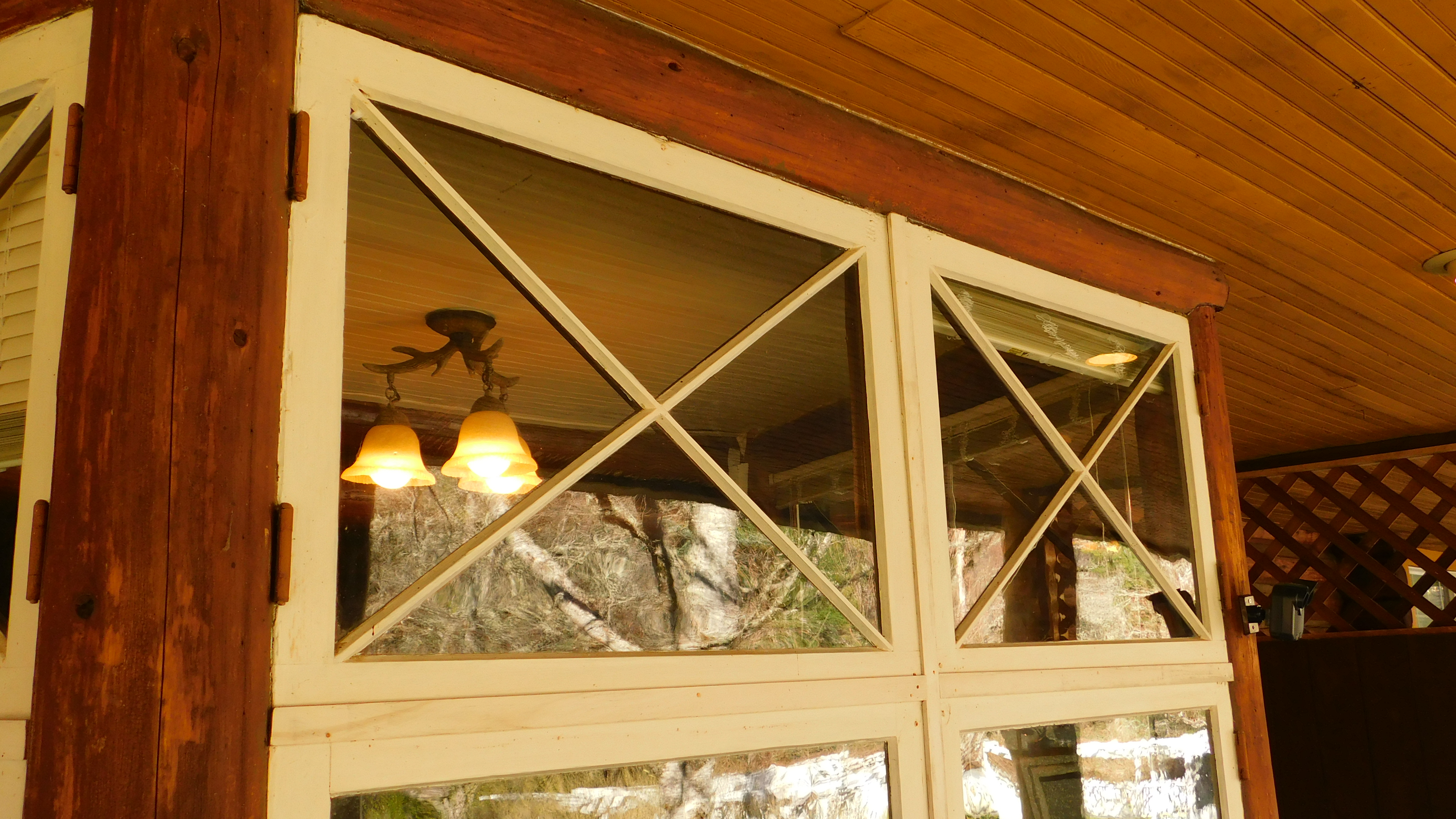
Bay window transom, 2026

=== Interior ===
The ground floor interior consists of a foyer and large dining room. Both areas containing a tapered fireplace with stone masonry and log mantel. The size of the cobblestones deceases in size as the stack condenses toward the ceiling. An innkeeper's office and private room also resides on the first floor. The main staircase, with a railing supported by poles stripped of bark, is next to the foyer. Interior walls are mostly built of logs.

The second story is divided by a long hallway, four rooms to each side each with a dormer. Visitors can take in views of Mineral Lake on the second floor balcony at the end of the hall. While partitions in the section are modern-day framing, the ceiling throughout the top floor is finished in 3 in (7.6 cm) tongue and groove, beveled wood planking. The lodge was listed with a total of twenty-five total rooms, 17 as bedrooms.

At the time of the 1975 NRHP nomination, several original pieces of furniture which were created for the lodge still remained.

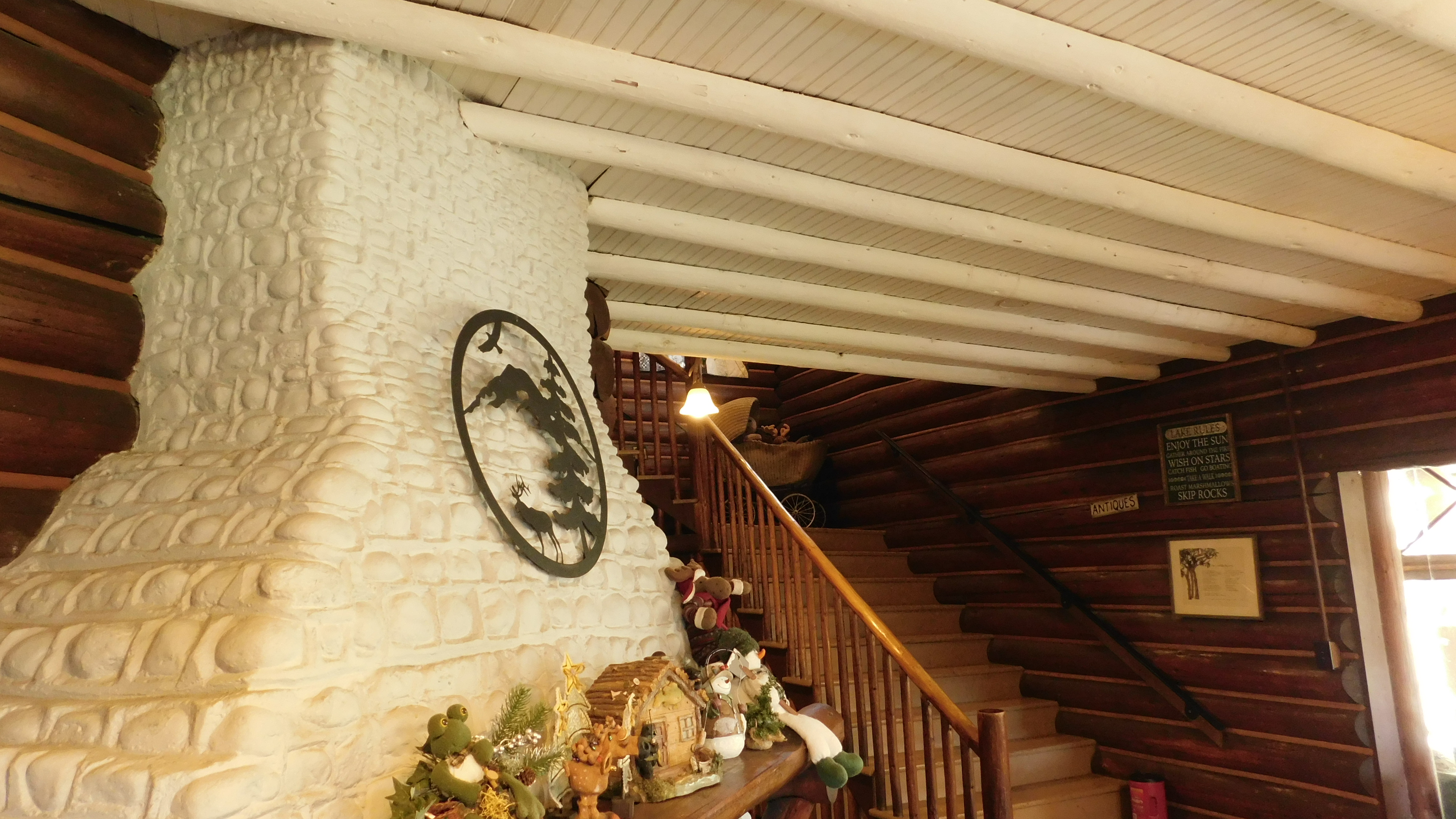
Interior, lobby, 2026

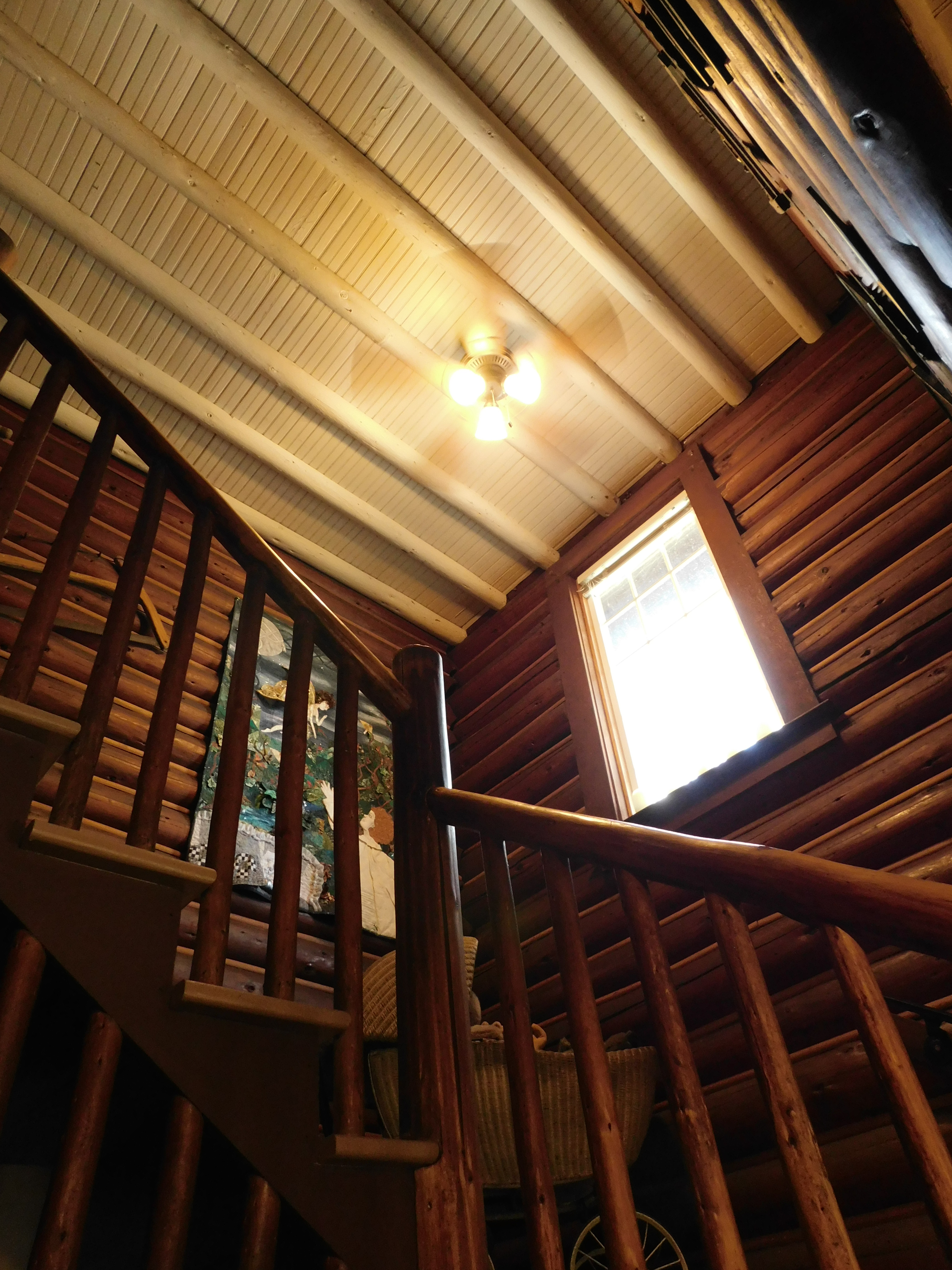
Interior, stairwell, 2026

=== Extinct features ===
In 1926, the inn was reported as having bedrooms on the third floor. A reading-and-writing room existed at the time, mentioned as being next to a living room.

== Significance ==
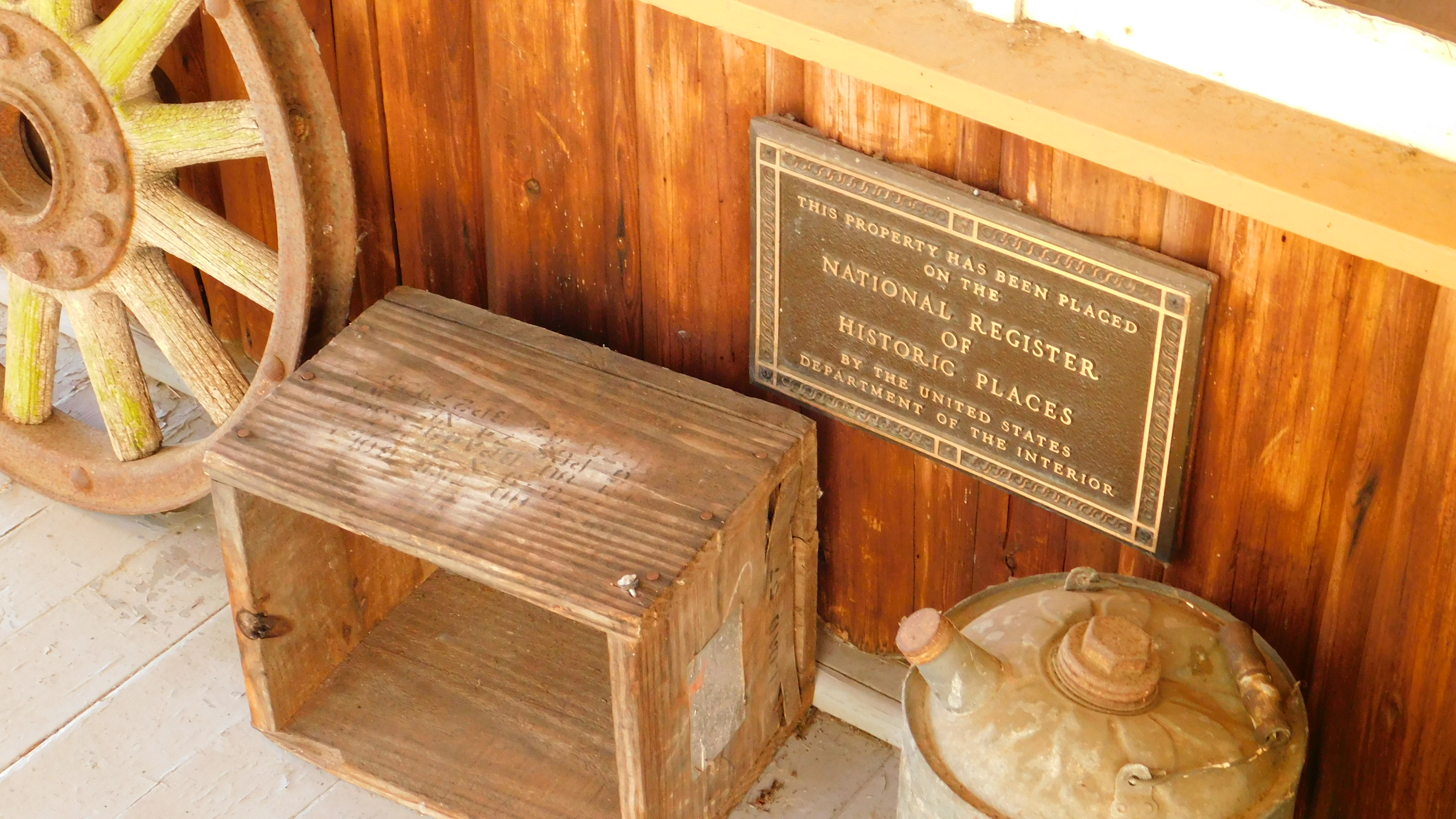
NRHP plaque, 2026

The Mineral Lake Lodge was accepted to the National Register of Historic Places and the Washington State Heritage Register on March 26, 1975. The structure was notable for its "rugged elegance" and complex, log construction, which the NRHP considered as an "outstanding example of craftsmanship using mostly readily available, natural materials". Additional contributing factors that determined the NRHP designation was the inn's history as a hunting lodge for the wealthy, its interesting though partially unsupported history, and the lodge's local importance and pride to the town of Mineral.

The lodge received a marker in 1995 from the Lewis County Sesquicentennial Committee honoring the county's 150th anniversary. At the time, it was one of 10 historical sites in the county to receive the marker.
