= Interstate 405 (Washington) =

Interstate highway bypassing Seattle, Washington, U.S.

Interstate 405
- I-405 highlighted in red

Route information
- Auxiliary route of I-5
- Maintained by WSDOT
- Length: 30.30 mi (48.76 km)
- Existed: 1957–present
- NHS: Entire route

Major junctions
- South end: I-5 / SR 518 in Tukwila
- SR 167 in Renton; I-90 in Bellevue; SR 520 in Bellevue; SR 522 in Bothell
- North end: I-5 / SR 525 in Lynnwood

Location
- Country: United States
- State: Washington
- Counties: King, Snohomish

Highway system
- Interstate Highway System; Main; Auxiliary; Suffixed; Business; Future; State highways in Washington; Interstate; US; State; Scenic; Pre-1964; 1964 renumbering; Former
← SR 401	→ SR 409

Interstate 405 (I-405) is a north–south auxiliary Interstate Highway serving the Seattle region of Washington, United States. It bypasses Seattle east of Lake Washington, traveling through the Eastside area of King and Snohomish counties, providing an alternate route to I-5. The 30-mile (48 km) freeway serves the cities of Renton, Bellevue, Kirkland, and Bothell. I-405 terminates at I-5 in Tukwila and Lynnwood, and also intersects several major highways, including SR 167, I-90, SR 520, and SR 522.

The Eastside highway was originally built in the early 20th century to connect cities along the lake and was formally added to the state highway system in 1937 as Secondary State Highway 2A (SSH 2A). A freeway replacement for SSH 2A was proposed in the 1940s by the state government and designated as I-405 as part of the federal Interstate Highway program, with the first section beginning construction in 1956 and completed in 1965. It was initially signed as SR 405 until the freeway was fully completed in 1971; since then, the highway has been expanded to add lanes for high-occupancy vehicles and toll users. I-405 is one of the most congested highways in the Seattle area and is known for its meandering "S-curves" through Renton, which were straightened in the 1990s.

== Route description ==
I-405 is a 30-mile (48 km) north–south freeway that serves as a bypass of I-5 through Seattle while serving the Eastside region. It is listed as part of the National Highway System, identifying routes that are important to the national economy, defense, and mobility, and the state's Highway of Statewide Significance program, recognizing its connection to major communities. The highway is maintained by the Washington State Department of Transportation (WSDOT), who conduct an annual survey of traffic volume that is expressed in terms of annual average daily traffic (AADT), a measure of traffic volume for any average day of the year. Average daily traffic volumes on I-405 in 2016 ranged from a minimum of 76,000 at its southern terminus in Tukwila to 209,000 in Downtown Bellevue. Approximately 86 percent of peak-direction lane miles on I-405 are rated as "routinely congested" by WSDOT and the highway accounted for over 30 percent of delays on the Seattle area's urban freeways from 2013 to 2017.

The freeway has a system of high-occupancy vehicle lanes (HOV lanes) from Tukwila to Downtown Bellevue that become high-occupancy toll lanes (HOT lanes) from Bellevue to Lynnwood. The HOT lanes are controlled through a series of designated access points and direct ramps located along I-405. Tolls are collected electronically through Good to Go transponders by overhead sensors or via license plate cameras for mail billing with a surcharge. The variable weekday toll rates are set according to traffic congestion, ranging from $0.75 to a maximum of $10, while weekends and federal holidays are toll-free. HOT lane tolls are waived for high-occupancy vehicles with three or more passengers during peak periods and two or more passengers during the mid-day when using the "FlexPass" that can toggle between tolled and HOV modes.

=== Tukwila to Bellevue ===
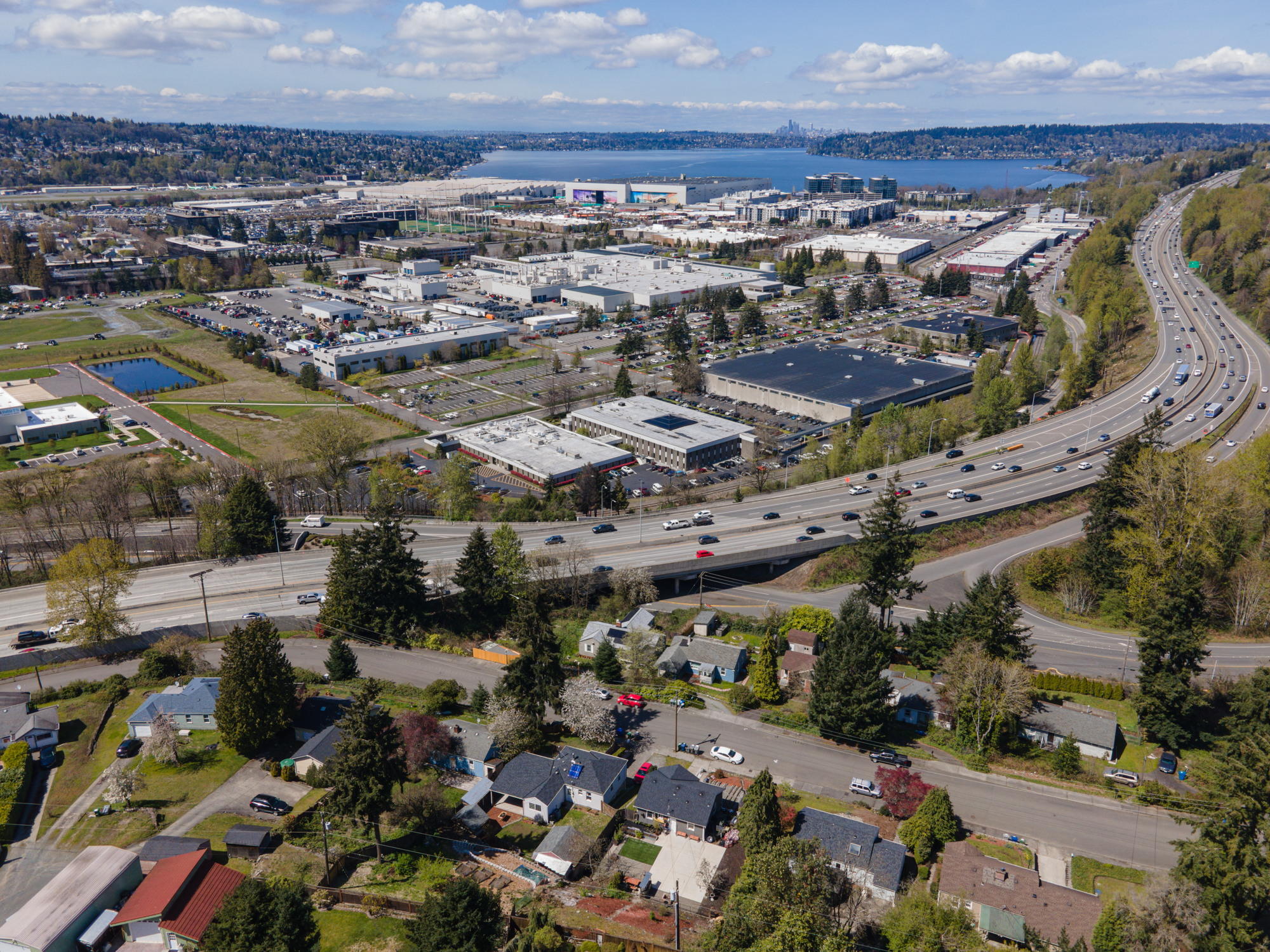
Aerial view of I-405 in Renton

I-405 begins as a continuation of State Route 518 (SR 518) at a multi-level junction with I-5 in Tukwila, northeast of Seattle–Tacoma International Airport. The eight-lane freeway gains a set of HOV lanes, directly connected to I-5, and travels around the north side of the Southcenter Mall, at the center of Tukwila's retail district. The mall is served by a set of auxiliary ramps around the periphery of the I-5/SR 518 interchange. I-405 travels east across the Green River and intersects Interurban Avenue at the north end of SR 181, located near the Tukwila train station and Starfire Sports soccer complex at Fort Dent Park. After crossing a set of railroad tracks (part of the BNSF Railway's Seattle Subdivision and the Union Pacific Railroad), the freeway enters the city of Renton and passes between a regional wastewater treatment plant and the former Longacres racetrack (now a Boeing office park). I-405 continues across the Black River and through an industrial and commercial area on the southern outskirts of Renton to a cloverleaf interchange with SR 167 (the Valley Freeway) and Rainier Avenue. The interchange, located near several car dealerships at the northwest corner of Talbot Hill, includes a direct HOV flyover ramp from I-405 southbound to SR 167 and SR 167 northbound to I-405.

The freeway turns northeast and runs below several hills with residential neighborhoods overlooking downtown Renton. I-405 intersects SR 515 in a half-diamond interchange and then enters a series of "s-curves" as it travels around the east side of downtown Renton. After crossing the Cedar River upstream from the Renton Public Library, the freeway passes through a public park and intersects SR 169 and SR 900 at two separate interchanges. The southern junction, with SR 169, is a partial cloverleaf interchange at Bronson Way, while the northern junction with SR 900 is a half-diamond that also marks the beginning of a short concurrency with the latter. The concurrent I-405 and SR 900 then pass the Kenworth truck plant and the Renton Landing shopping center near the Boeing Renton Factory before reaching a junction with Sunset Boulevard, which carries SR 900 east towards Issaquah.

From downtown Renton, I-405 narrows to six lanes and climbs over Kennydale Hill and descends down May Creek. The freeway, now closely following the shore of Lake Washington and the Eastside Rail Corridor trail, passes the Virginia Mason Athletic Center, the headquarters of the Seattle Seahawks football team. I-405 leaves Renton and briefly enters the city of Newcastle before continuing into the residential Newport neighborhood in southern Bellevue. The freeway travels along the lake and near several residential areas, passing through two intermediate interchanges at Newport Hills and Coal Creek near Newport High School. I-405 then passes the Marketplace at Factoria shopping center and the headquarters of T-Mobile US before it reaches a full stack interchange with I-90, which provides access to Seattle, Mercer Island, Eastgate, and Issaquah.

=== Bellevue to Lynnwood ===
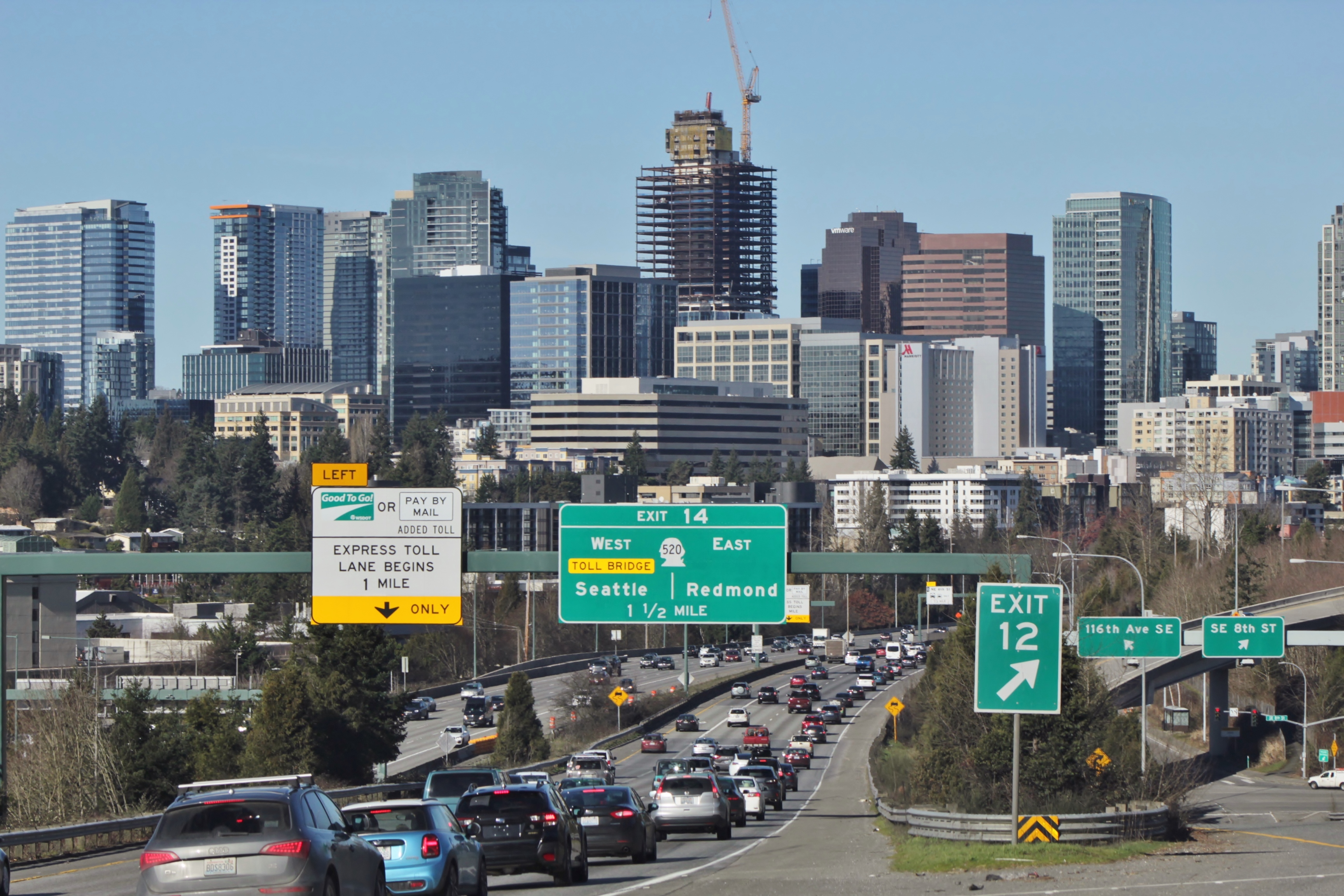
I-405 heading into downtown Bellevue

The freeway continues north from the interchange towards Downtown Bellevue, passing the Mercer Slough estuary and the historic Wilburton Trestle as it widens to ten lanes. I-405 travels through several interchanges and forms the eastern border of Downtown Bellevue, a major office district, separating it from the retail areas of Wilburton. It intersects Northeast 4th Street in a diamond interchange, Northeast 6th Street in an HOV-only Texas T interchange serving the Bellevue Transit Center and under the 2 Line light rail guideway, and Northeast 8th Street in a cloverleaf interchange near the Overlake Medical Center. A set of four HOT lanes begin at the Northeast 6th Street ramp, traveling north with limited entry and exit points.

I-405 continues north from Downtown Bellevue into the city's northern residential and commercial neighborhoods, where it intersects SR 520—a major east–west freeway with connections to Seattle, the Microsoft campus in Overlake, and Redmond. The partial cloverleaf interchange includes a braided ramp from the northbound exit allowing traffic from Northeast 8th Street to enter I-405 and traffic from Northeast 10th Street to access SR 520. The freeway leaves Bellevue for Kirkland, traveling along the west side of Bridle Trails State Park and passing the campus of Northwest University in the predominantly residential Houghton neighborhood. I-405 then travels along the west side of Rose Hill, an area uphill from and about one mile (1.6 km) east of downtown Kirkland, intersecting Northeast 85th Street (formerly SR 908) near Lake Washington High School. The freeway continues north along the Cross Kirkland Corridor (part of the Eastside Rail Corridor trail) to the Totem Lake area, where it has three junctions. The southernmost is a half single-point urban interchange with Northeast 116th Street near the Lake Washington Institute of Technology campus, followed by a partial cloverleaf interchange with Northeast 124th Street serving The Village at Totem Lake shopping center, and a median interchange with Northeast 128th Street in the I-405 HOT lanes near EvergreenHealth's main medical center.

The freeway continues north through Kirkland's residential Kingsgate neighborhood and enters the city of Bothell near an interchange with Northeast 160th Street. I-405's HOT lanes are reduced to one per direction and a northbound braided ramp begins to separate traffic bound for SR 522, the next interchange. The combination interchange with SR 522 is located above the Sammamish River and adjacent to the University of Washington Bothell and Cascadia College campus; SR 522 continues west along Lake Washington towards Seattle and east through Woodinville towards Monroe. The freeway crosses over North Creek and intersects Northeast 195th Street near several office parks at the northern border of King County.

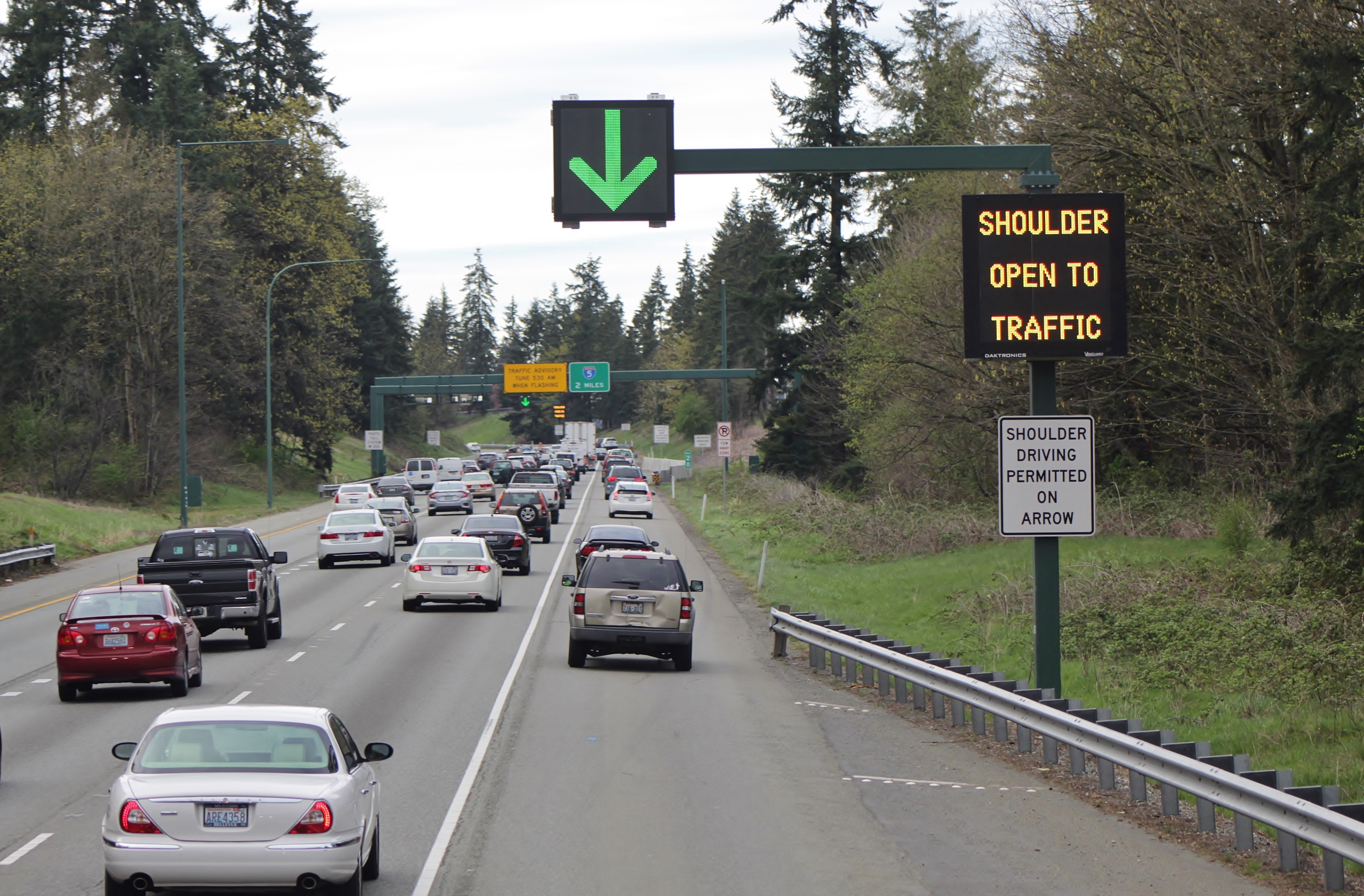
Sign-controlled peak shoulder lane on northbound I-405 in Bothell

I-405 enters Snohomish County and travels northwest through a wooded area along North Creek before reaching an interchange with the Bothell–Everett Highway, which continues north to Mill Creek as SR 527. The interchange, located in the Canyon Park industrial area, is adjacent to a park and ride that serves as the southern terminus of the Swift Green Line and has a dedicated pedestrian bridge. The freeway continues northwest through residential neighborhoods and gains a set of auxiliary lanes in the shoulder that are opened to northbound traffic during limited periods using a series of overhead signs and restricted to transit use in the southbound direction. I-405 continues northwest, crossing over SR 524 without an interchange, and terminates at a combination interchange with I-5 east of the Alderwood Mall in Lynnwood. The freeway continues north as SR 525, which connects to SR 99 and serves the Mukilteo terminal on the Washington State Ferries system.

== History ==
=== Early highways ===
During early development of the Eastside region in the late 19th century, travel between cities was dependent on boats, including a system of passenger steamboats and ferries on Lake Washington. The first completed railroad on the Eastside was the Lake Washington Belt Line, opened from Renton to Woodinville in late 1904 by the Northern Pacific Railway. It was intended to allow freight to bypass Seattle's congested railyards and was also served by passenger trains. The area's first log roads had been built in the early 1890s and were expanded across the region by the beginning of the 20th century, including predecessors to I-405.

A north–south road between Kirkland and modern-day Bellevue was completed in 1908 and gradually extended south to Renton and north to Bothell. The road, named Lake Washington Boulevard, was fully paved by 1932 and designated by the state legislature as part of Secondary State Highway 2A (SSH 2A) in 1937. SSH 2A traveled north from US 10 in Renton to Primary State Highway 2 (PSH 2) in Bothell, continuing onward to US 99 in Everett. Three Tree Point Road, which connected Burien to Renton, was designated as SSH 1L. The Bothell–Everett section of SSH 2A was later removed from the state highway system in 1943.

Planning for a series of upgrades to transform SSH 2A into a suitable bypass of US 99 around Seattle began in the late 1940s. A plan announced in 1947 would use federal funds to build a new two-lane road between Bellevue and Woodinville, supplementing another road to Kennydale that was already under construction. Additional right-of-way would be acquired to allow for expansion to four lanes at a later date. Following a survey by the state highway department, a route generally following 116th Avenue Northeast was chosen in 1949; plans also called for a limited-access highway with several cloverleaf interchanges dependent on available funding. A four-mile (6.4 km) section of the new highway between Kennydale and Bellevue began construction in February 1947 and was completed the following year.

The East Pacific Highway Association, formed to plan a major highway to the east of US 99 from Tenino to the Canadian border, lobbied the state legislature for funding to complete the 25-mile (40 km) link between Renton and Woodinville. The state government approved plans for the Eastside highway in 1952 as part of its limited-access highway network and allocated funds to begin acquisition of right-of-way along the corridor. The federal Bureau of Public Roads included the Eastside bypass of Seattle in its 1955 recommendation for a national system of Interstate routes; it would generally follow SSH 1L and SSH 2A to northern Kirkland before turning northwest near Bothell on a new route to the already-planned Seattle–Everett freeway (now I-5). The system was approved by the signing of the Federal Aid Highway Act of 1956, which included funds for upgrading SSH 2A into a freeway. The highway, also known as the Renton Freeway, would follow the new SSH 2A roadway and include a new connection to Lynnwood.

Construction of a new alignment for SSH 2A began in 1953; the section between Bellevue and Kirkland was completed in October 1956 after two years of construction that was slowed by difficult soil conditions. The former alignment on Lake Washington Boulevard and Market Street through Kirkland was transferred to the city government. SSH 2A and the eastern portion of SSH 1L were replaced in 1957 by the Renton branch of PSH 1, created to consolidate the bypass into a single numbered highway. In 1957, the Washington State Highway Commission approved accelerated plans to build new two-lane sections of the future freeway corridor that would be designed to accommodate later expansions to four lanes with limited access to adhere to Interstate standards. By the end of the year, the new highway had been extended 3.3 miles (5.3 km) north to Juanita and the southern outskirts of Woodinville.

=== Interstate construction ===
The American Association of State Highway Officials approved Interstate 405 as the designation for the Seattle bypass freeway in November 1958, based on a proposal submitted by the Washington State Department of Highways. On October 23, 1958, a dual ribbon-cutting ceremony marked the completion of the Renton–Kennydale and Kirkland–Woodinville sections of the initial highway. The 2.6-mile (4.2 km) northern extension, which terminated with a connection to Woodinville Drive, took five months to construct and included several new overpasses. The highway's completion spurred economic growth in Bellevue, which was sought due to its location near a junction with US 10; from 1955 to 1958, the city and its surrounding areas had grown from a population of 27,600 to 41,750.

Expansion of the existing two-lane highway into a freeway began with a section between Factoria and Downtown Bellevue that opened in 1961. The project included a cloverleaf interchange at Northeast 8th Street in Downtown Bellevue. A nearby interchange at Northrup Road was rebuilt in 1963 to temporarily accommodate traffic from the then-new Evergreen Point Floating Bridge using a hybrid cloverleaf design. Construction of the permanent interchange was later completed in November 1966 at a cost of $5.5 million.

In 1964, the system of primary and secondary state highways was removed in favor of new state routes, and the incomplete sections of the corridor were renumbered to SR 405. By 1966, the remaining sections of SR 405 were fully renumbered to I-405. The first segment of the Renton Freeway to be completed was between Tukwila and Renton, costing $12.6 million and opening to traffic on August 31, 1965. An extension that bypassed downtown Renton opened on September 3, connecting with the existing freeway to Kennydale.

A four-lane section of I-405 between Kennydale and Factoria in southern Bellevue was opened to traffic in August of that year. A temporary overpass with a traffic signal was installed at the Factoria interchange while construction continued on a new connection to US 10 (later I-90) for several more years. The 209-acre (85 ha) interchange with I-5 at Tukwila opened in stages between February and November 1967; it cost $16 million to construct and included ramps to the new Southcenter shopping mall.

The final section of I-405 to be built, between Woodinville and Lynnwood, was opened to traffic in November 1969. Further construction expanded I-405 to six lanes, including a section near Woodinville that involved the demolition of recent bridges that were too narrow to support three lanes per direction. These projects had been delayed due to a cut in federal highway spending in the late 1960s. The proposed route between Bothell and Lynnwood was originally planned to follow Swamp Creek from Kenmore, but was later moved further northeast to North Creek after opposition from residents. It was later revived in 1971 as part of a shorter connector between Kenmore and I-405 that was rejected for a lack of projected need.

=== Later development ===
In the 1960s, the state government studied the construction of an outer freeway bypass due to expected traffic demand on I-405. A report released in 1970 concluded that the outer bypass, nicknamed I-605, would not be necessary and recommended expanding I-405 to eight lanes in some sections. The proposal had also been controversial with residents around Lake Sammamish, around which the freeway corridor was moved several times.

The first sound wall on a highway in Washington was installed in 1973 along I-405 near the Wilburton interchange in Bellevue. It was constructed from plywood and placed near Bellevue to mitigate construction noise; at the time, the northbound carriageway had bidirectional traffic.

One of the major construction projects on the highway was straightening the s-curves in Renton, which were designed for speeds of up to 45 miles per hour (72 km/h). This project began in 1990, and was estimated to cost $70 million. Also during this time, the portion of the highway between I-5 and South Renton was being repaved and HOV lanes were being added, which were originally placed on the right-hand side of the road before being migrated over to the median in the early 2000s.

=== 21st century ===
Originally intended as a bypass to I-5 through Seattle, I-405 has experienced a large increase in traffic volume since its construction. I-405 is now the most congested freeway in Washington State, particularly the segment between State Route 169 and I-90.

A Nickel Project funded in 2003 originally included three planned improvements for I-405:

- The construction of one lane in each direction between SE 8th and I-90, replacing the Wilburton Tunnel.
- The construction of one northbound lane from NE 70th to NE 124th, and one southbound lane from SR 522 to SR 520.
- The construction of one northbound lane from SR 181 to SR 167, and one southbound lane from SR 169 to SR 167.

In 2005, the "Renton to Bellevue Project" was added as an additional Nickel Project, and would have added two lanes in each direction between SR 169 and I-90. However, in November 2007, voters rejected the ballot measure which would have provided the additional funds necessary for this project. At this time the project is still largely unfunded. The web site "Road to Ruin" ranks the widening of I-405 as the fourth most wasteful highway project in the United States. The project is designed to help traffic move more smoothly on I-405.

A 2008 construction project demolished the Wilburton Tunnel, which formerly covered a portion of the freeway between Factoria and Bellevue and carried the BNSF Woodinville Subdivision.

On September 27, 2015, a set of high-occupancy toll lanes (HOT lanes) opened on I-405 between Bellevue and Lynnwood, replacing the existing HOV lanes from NE 6th Street to I-5/SR 525. Construction on the southern half of the HOT lanes system, extending to the SR 167 interchange in Renton, began in 2020 and is forecast to be completed in summer 2027 at a cost of $1.2 billion.

The City of Bellevue plans to construct a lidded park over a section of I-405 between 4th and 6th streets as part of its "Grand Connection" program. A new half-diamond interchange at Northeast 132nd Street in Kirkland opened on May 20, 2024, while the Northeast 85th Street cloverleaf interchange is planned to be reconstructed as part of a bus rapid transit project.

== Transit service ==
The I-405 corridor is served by several express bus routes operated by Sound Transit, King County Metro, and Community Transit. They connect several hubs that are centered around Bellevue Transit Center, accessed via the HOV ramp at Northeast 6th Street in Downtown Bellevue, and continue beyond I-405 to Everett, Burien, and the Green River Valley. The freeway also has several large park-and-ride facilities that are served by flyer stops and direct access HOV ramps. In 2017, 202 bus trips on the I-405 corridor carried approximately 6,800 passengers during peak periods on an average weekday.

The Sound Transit 3 ballot measure, passed in 2016, includes $1 billion in funding for a bus rapid transit (BRT) system covering the entirety of the I-405 corridor using the expanded HOT lanes. The system, part of the Stride network, will have two lines: the S1 Line from Burien to Bellevue and the S2 Line from Bellevue to Lynnwood. The Stride lines will serve eleven stations, mostly at existing flyer stops, and have a maximum frequency of 10 minutes during peak periods. They are scheduled to open between 2028 and 2029. One of the new stations on the BRT corridor, at Northeast 85th Street in Kirkland, is planned to include reconstruction of the existing cloverleaf interchange at an estimated cost of $300 million.

== Exit list ==
County	Location	mi	km	Exit	Destinations	Notes
King	Tukwila	0.00	0.00		SR 518 west – Burien, Sea-Tac Airport	Continuation beyond I-5
King	Tukwila	0.00	0.00	—	I-5 – Portland, Seattle	Southern terminus
King	Tukwila	0.34	0.55	—	Southcenter Boulevard – Southcenter Mall	Southbound exit and northbound entrance
King	Tukwila	0.98	1.58	1	SR 181 south (West Valley Highway) – Tukwila	
King	Renton	2.32	3.73	2	SR 167 / Rainier Avenue S – Kent, Auburn, Renton	Signed as exits 2A (south) and 2B (north) southbound
King	Renton	2.79	4.49	3	SR 515 (Talbot Road S)	Southbound exit and northbound entrance
King	Renton	4.00	6.44	4	SR 169 south / Bronson Way (SR 900 west) – Maple Valley	No southbound exit
King	Renton	4.50	7.24	4	SR 900 west (Sunset Boulevard) to SR 169 south – Renton, Enumclaw	Southern end of SR 900 concurrency; southbound exit and northbound entrance; no access to northbound Sunset Boulevard from southbound exit
King	Renton	5.39	8.67	5	SR 900 east (NE Sunset Boulevard) / Park Avenue N – Issaquah	Northern end of SR 900 concurrency
King	Renton	6.48	10.43	6	NE 30th Street	
King	Renton	7.44	11.97	7	NE 44th Street	
King	Bellevue	9.23	14.85	9	112th Avenue SE, Lake Washington Boulevard – Newcastle	
King	Bellevue	10.17	16.37	10	Coal Creek Parkway / Factoria Boulevard SE	
King	Bellevue	11.06	17.80	11	I-90 – Seattle, Spokane	
King	Bellevue	12.78	20.57	12	SE 8th Street / 116th Avenue SE	
King	Bellevue	13.54	21.79	13A	NE 4th Street	
King	Bellevue	13.68	22.02	♦	NE 6th Street	HOV 2+ access only northbound, HOV 3+ and toll access only southbound; southern terminus of Express Lanes
King	Bellevue	13.81	22.23	13B	NE 8th Street	
King	Bellevue	14.84	23.88	14	SR 520 – Seattle, Redmond	Northbound exit ramp has direct entrance from NE 10th Street
King	Kirkland	17.43	28.05	17	NE 70th Place	
King	Kirkland	18.11	29.15	18	NE 85th Street – Kirkland	Former SR 908
King	Kirkland	19.84	31.93	20A	NE 116th Street	Northbound exit and southbound entrance
King	Kirkland	20.30	32.67	20B	NE 124th Street / Totem Lake Boulevard	Signed as exit 20 southbound
King	Kirkland	20.64	33.22	♦	NE 128th Street	HOV 2+ access only
King	Kirkland			21	NE 132nd Street	Southbound exit and northbound entrance
King	Bothell	22.61	36.39	22	NE 160th Street	
King	Bothell	23.53	37.87	23	SR 522 to US 2 – Bothell, Woodinville, Kenmore	Signed as exits 23A (east) and 23B (west) southbound
King	Bothell	24.46	39.36	24	NE 195th Street / Beardslee Boulevard	Northbound exit has direct entrance from SR 522
Snohomish	Bothell	26.73	43.02	26	SR 527 north – Bothell, Mill Creek	
Snohomish	Lynnwood	30.30	48.76	—	I-5 – Lynnwood, Seattle, Everett, Vancouver B.C.	Northern terminus
Snohomish	Lynnwood	30.30	48.76		SR 525 north – Mukilteo	Continuation beyond I-5
1.000 mi = 1.609 km; 1.000 km = 0.621 mi: Concurrency terminus; HOV only; Incomplete access; Route transition
