= Washington State Route 515 =

State highway in King County, Washington, US

State Route 515
- A map of Kent and Renton with SR 515 highlighted in red

Route information
- Auxiliary route of I-5
- Maintained by WSDOT
- Length: 7.86 mi (12.65 km)
- Existed: 1964–present

Major junctions
- South end: SR 516 in Kent
- I-405 in Renton
- North end: SR 900 in Renton

Location
- Country: United States
- State: Washington
- County: King

Highway system
- State highways in Washington; Interstate; US; State; Scenic; Pre-1964; 1964 renumbering; Former
← SR 513	→ SR 516

State Route 515 (SR 515) is a state highway in the U.S. state of Washington serving suburban King County. The highway travels 8 miles (12.9 km) north from SR 516 in eastern Kent to Renton, where it intersects Interstate 405 (I-405) and SR 900. It has carried the memorial designation of Martin Luther King Jr. Way since December 2025.

The highway was originally built by the county government in the 1910s as a winding gravel road connecting local coal mines. It was straightened and paved in the 1920s and was designated as Secondary State Highway 5C (SSH 5C) in 1937. SSH 5C was replaced by SR 515 in the 1964 state highway renumbering and extended north into downtown Renton after the construction of I-405. A section of the highway on Talbot Highway was moved to a new bypass road in 1982 and other sections in Kent were widened to four lanes in 1991. The I-405 underpass was rebuilt as a half diamond interchange in 2010.

== Route description ==
SR 515 begins at an intersection with SR 516 east of downtown Kent, in the business district of the East Hill neighborhood. The highway travels north on a four-lane section of 104th Avenue Southeast, passing Kent-Meridian High School and several suburban neighborhoods. SR 515 then diverts northeast onto 108th Avenue and crosses Harrison Creek, leaving Kent city limits near Panther Lake. The highway enters Renton and continues north through suburban neighborhoods along the east edge of the SR 167 freeway. It passes the Valley Medical Center at Carr Road and turns northwest onto Benson Road. SR 515 then descends from Talbot Hill and passes under a pedestrian overpass at Thomas Teasdale Park.

The highway then supersedes a section of Talbot Road and crosses under I-405, which it intersects in a half diamond interchange at the south edge of downtown Renton. Talbot Road continues into downtown Renton, passing several big-box stores and SR 515 turns northeast onto Grady Way near the city hall. Grady Way turns into Main Street and travels north along an embanked section of I-405 towards the center of downtown Renton. SR 515 terminates at two intersections with SR 900, which is split between a pair of one-way streets: Houser Way, which also carries a street running railroad, and Bronson Way one block from the Cedar River and the Renton Public Library.

SR 515 is used by King County Metro route 160, which provides bus connections to areas between Kent's train station and Downtown Renton. The Washington State Department of Transportation (WSDOT) conducts an annual survey of traffic volumes on state highways measured in terms of annual average daily traffic. Traffic volumes on SR 515 range from a minimum of 7,900 vehicles in downtown Renton to a maximum of 31,000 vehicles in northern Kent.

== History ==
Benson Road, connecting Kent to Renton over the Benson and Talbot hills, was constructed in the 1910s as a gravel road serving local coal mines. The road was straightened and paved by the county government in the mid-1920s, with all but one mile (1.6 km) completed by 1928. Benson Road was added to the state highway system in 1937 as Secondary State Highway 5C (SSH 5C), which connected Primary State Highway 2 (PSH 2) in Renton to SSH 5A east of Kent.

SR 515 was created during the 1964 state highway renumbering to replace SSH 5C, while PSH 2 became SR 900 and SSH 5A became SR 516. The Renton Freeway (I-405) opened to traffic in 1965 and crossed under SR 515 without intersecting it. SR 515 was subsequently extended further north into downtown Renton over the former alignment of SR 405. Suburban development of the Kent and Renton areas in the 1960s and 1970s brought higher traffic volumes to the highway, necessitating an expansion project. The project, which would construct a 1.5-mile (2.4 km) bypass of Benson Road between Carr Road and I-405, was opposed by local residents and was frequently cut and revived due to limited availability of state funds. The $4.5 million, four-lane road was approved by the state government in 1981 as part of a new gas tax and was completed the following year. The remaining section of SR 515 in eastern Kent was widened by the city government in 1991 using funds approved by the state legislature.

As part of a $84 million project to widen I-405 through Renton, a new interchange with SR 515 was constructed and opened to traffic in December 2010. The half diamond interchange consists of an onramp to northbound I-405 and an offramp from southbound I-405 and was intended to siphon traffic from the nearby SR 167 interchange.

== Major intersections ==
The entire highway is in King County.

Location	mi	km	Destinations	Notes
Kent	0.00	0.00	SR 516 (SE 256th Street) – Kent	Southern terminus, continues as 104th Avenue Southeast
Renton	6.90	11.10	I-405 north – Bellevue	Interchange, northbound entrance and southbound exit
Renton	7.86	12.65	SR 900 east (S 3rd Street) – Issaquah	Northern terminus
1.000 mi = 1.609 km; 1.000 km = 0.621 mi: Incomplete access
