= West Valley Highway =

West Valley Highway may refer to:

- Oregon Route 18#Oregon Route 18 Business
- Washington State Route 181
