= Washington State Route 181 =

State highway in King County, Washington, US

State Route 181
- Valley Highway
- SR 181 highlighted in red

Route information
- Maintained by WSDOT
- Length: 6.05 mi (9.74 km)
- Existed: 1964–present

Major junctions
- South end: SR 516 in Kent
- North end: I-405 in Tukwila

Location
- Country: United States
- State: Washington
- County: King

Highway system
- State highways in Washington; Interstate; US; State; Scenic; Pre-1964; 1964 renumbering; Former
← SR 174	→ I-182

State Route 181 (SR 181, named the Valley Highway) is a 6.05-mile-long (9.74 km) state highway serving King County in the U.S. state of Washington. The highway, travelling north parallel to the Green River, begins at SR 516 in Kent and ends at an interchange with Interstate 405 (I-405) in Tukwila. The highway primarily serves as an alternate route to the SR 167 freeway, which travels east parallel to SR 181.

The original route, between Auburn and Rainier Valley in Seattle, was originally established in 1931 as a branch of Primary State Highway 1 (PSH 1) and in 1937 as Secondary State Highway 5M (SSH 5M). SSH 5M was renumbered to SSH 2M in 1959 and became SR 181 after the 1964 highway renumbering. SR 181 was shortened twice in the 1970s from Seattle to Tukwila and once more in 1991 from Auburn to Kent to form its present route, no longer connected to parent route SR 18.

== Route description ==
SR 181 begins as the Valley Highway at an intersection with SR 516 west of Downtown Kent and an interchange between SR 516 and SR 167. The highway travels north and parallels the Green River and a pedestrian and bicycle trail to the west and the Interurban Trail to the east into Tukwila. SR 181 begins to parallel a BNSF and Union Pacific rail line to the east as it serves Tukwila Station. The highway ends at a partial cloverleaf interchange with I-405, crossing over the Green River shortly before its northern terminus.

== History ==
The West Valley Highway was built in the early 1910s, after an alignment on the west side of the White (now Green) River Valley was chosen by county engineers in 1909.

SR 181 was formed during the 1964 state highway renumbering as a highway following the Green and Duwamish rivers from SR 18 in Auburn through Kent and Tukwila to SR 900 in Seattle. The 11.58-mile-long (18.64 km) route was originally signed in 1937 as SSH 5M from PSH 5 in Auburn to U.S. Route 99 (US 99) and PSH 1, and in 1931 as a branch of PSH 1 from SSH 5M to PSH 2. SSH 5M was renumbered to SSH 2M in 1959 and the southern terminus of the highway was moved to a new branch of PSH 2. SSH 2M and the PSH 1 branch were combined into SR 181 in 1964, and was truncated to newly created SR 599 in 1971. The northern terminus was moved to its current location, an interchange with I-405 in 1979, and the southern terminus was moved to Kent in 1991. No major revisions to the route of the highway have occurred since 1991 and the highway is no longer connected to parent route SR 18.

== Major intersections ==
The entire highway is in King County.

Location	mi	km	Destinations	Notes
Kent	0.00	0.00	SR 516 – Des Moines	Southern terminus
Tukwila	5.97– 6.05	9.61– 9.74	I-405 to I-5 – Bellevue, Renton, Everett	Northern terminus; interchange
1.000 mi = 1.609 km; 1.000 km = 0.621 mi
