= Washington State Route 169 =

State highway in King County, Washington, US

State Route 169
- SR 169 highlighted in red

Route information
- Maintained by WSDOT
- Length: 25.26 mi (40.65 km)
- Existed: 1964–present

Major junctions
- South end: SR 164 in Enumclaw
- SR 516 in Maple Valley; SR 18 in Maple Valley; I-405 in Renton
- North end: SR 900 in Renton

Location
- Country: United States
- State: Washington
- County: King

Highway system
- State highways in Washington; Interstate; US; State; Scenic; Pre-1964; 1964 renumbering; Former
← SR 168	→ SR 170

State Route 169 (SR 169) is a state highway in the U.S. state of Washington, located entirely within King County. It runs 25 miles (40 km) from Enumclaw to Renton, passing through Black Diamond and Maple Valley. The highway, also known as the Maple Valley Highway, functions as a major rural and suburban route for the southeastern Seattle metropolitan area and connects several highways, including SR 410, SR 18, and Interstate 405 (I-405).

The Enumclaw–Maple Valley–Renton highway was built in 1914 and expanded in the early 1930s by the county government. It was absorbed into the state highway system in 1937 and designated as a branch of Primary State Highway 5 and renumbered to SR 169 in 1964. Recent residential development in Maple Valley and surrounding areas has increased traffic congestion on the highway, leading to a series of widening and improvement projects funded primarily by city governments.

== Route description ==
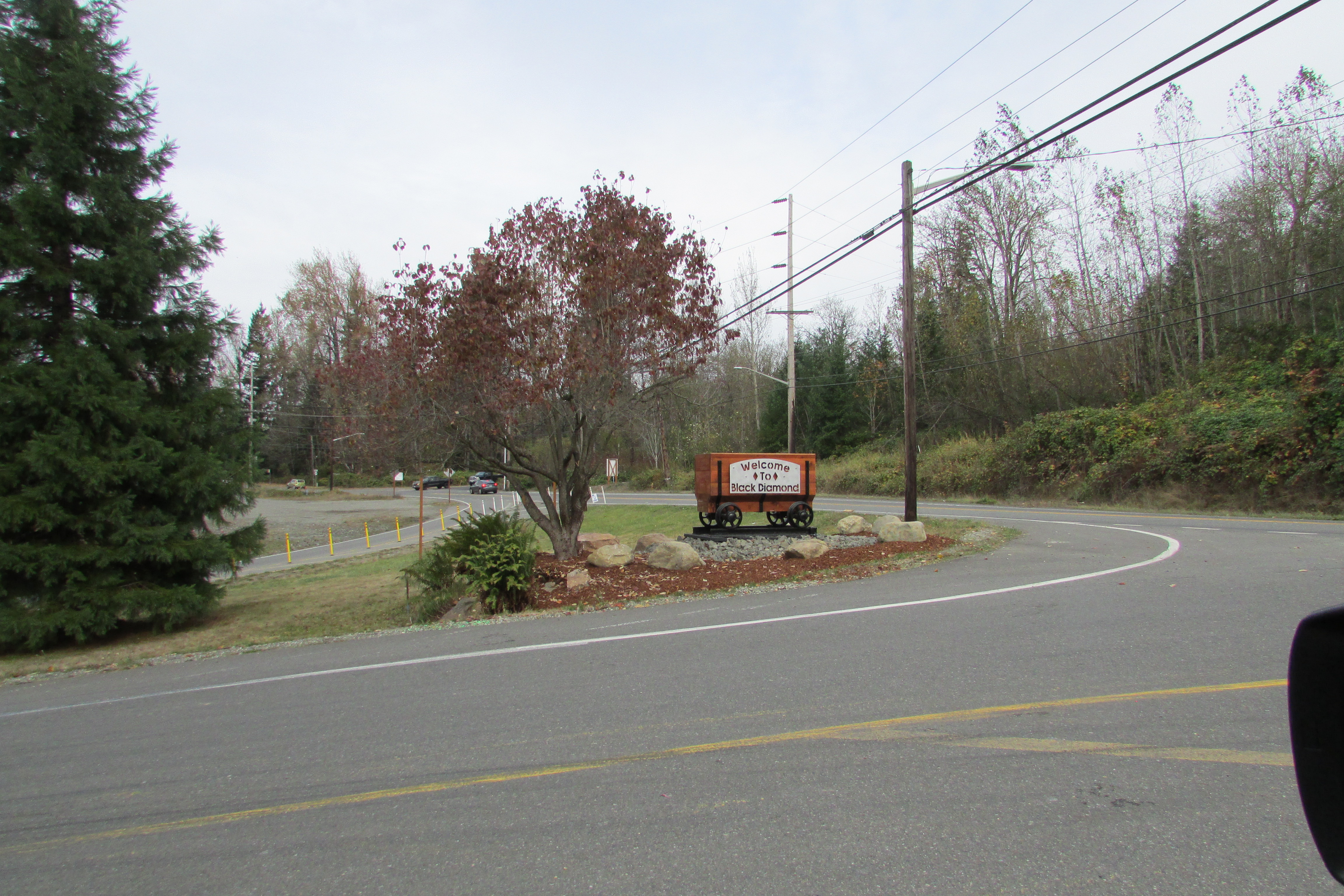
A sign for Black Diamond on SR 169

SR 169 begins on a section of Porter Street in downtown Enumclaw at an intersection with SR 164 (Griffin Avenue). The intersection is adjacent to a satellite campus of the Green River College system and is a half-mile (0.8 km) from the junction of SR 164 and SR 410, which travels west towards Puyallup and east across the Cascade Mountains. SR 169 travels north through Enumclaw's residential neighborhoods and leaves the city after crossing Newaukam Creek. The highway continues north across the rural Enumclaw Plateau and past several gravel mines before beginning its ascent into the hills of Black Diamond.

The highway crosses 155 feet (47 m) over the Green River gorge on the Kummer Bridge (officially the Dan Evans Bridge) downriver of Franklin, a ghost town. SR 169 continues northwest through the city of Black Diamond, surrounded by several coal mines, and passes a trailhead for the Black Diamond Natural Area near Lake Sawyer. It turns north at the southern boundary of Maple Valley, near a crossing of a railroad, and travels through several suburban subdivisions near Tahoma High School. The highway widens to five lanes in the city's Four Corners commercial center, where it intersects the eastern end of SR 516, which travels west to Covington and Kent. SR 169 continues northwest through suburban neighborhoods surrounding Lake Wilderness and reaches the city's northern commercial district, where it runs parallel to SR 18, a major regional freeway. The two highways are connected by a local road, Southeast 231st Street, but do not directly intersect. SR 169 crosses under SR 18 and continues northwest along the Cedar River and the Cedar River Trail.

SR 169 continues along the west bank of the Cedar River, running north at the floor of the rural Cedar River Valley southwest of Squak Mountain. The highway turns west near Maple Valley Heights and passes several recreational areas. The road widens to four lanes and enters Renton after crossing over the Cedar River. SR 169 briefly swings southwest before continuing northwest on its way towards a partial cloverleaf interchange with I-405. The highway continues under the freeway to an intersection with SR 900 at Bronson Way and Sunset Boulevard, where SR 169 terminates.

The entire route of SR 169, also known as the Maple Valley Highway, was designated by the state government as a Highway of Statewide Significance in 2006, recognizing its role in connecting major communities. The highway is maintained by the Washington State Department of Transportation (WSDOT), which conducts an annual survey on the state's highways to measure traffic volume in terms of annual average daily traffic. In 2016, WSDOT calculated that the busiest section of the highway, near I-405 in Renton, carried an average of 43,000 vehicles per day. The least traveled section of SR 169, located at its southern terminus in Enumclaw, carried only 7,700 vehicles.

== History ==
The Enumclaw and Black Diamond highway was constructed in 1914 by the county government, using funds allocated by the state legislature. The highway replaced an earlier road with steeper grades of up to 20 percent, reducing them to a maximum of 5 percent. A steel bridge was constructed across the Green River gorge near Franklin, at a cost of $30,000 (equivalent to $692,000 in 2024 dollars). An extension through Maple Valley to Renton was also constructed using separate funds. It follows the general route of the Columbia and Puget Sound Railroad, a branch of the transcontinental Northern Pacific Railway that was constructed in the 1880s to connect the area's coal mines to Seattle.

Most of the highway was reconstructed and paved in the early 1930s. The bridge over the Green River was rebuilt in 1933 with a steel truss and concrete road deck. The Enumclaw–Renton highway was designated as a branch of Primary State Highway 5 in 1937. During the 1964 state highway renumbering, it was re-designated as SR 169. In the late 1980s, WSDOT straightened and widened a section of SR 169 after completing a land swap deal with the Burlington Northern Railroad, contingent on a new track built in exchange for the abandonment of a section along the highway.

Since the 1990s, residential development in Maple Valley has led to traffic congestion and an increase in collisions on sections of SR 169. Despite calls for highway expansion, the state government has prioritized other corridors instead of SR 169, with no plans for future construction. The city government independently funded $47 million in interim corridor improvements, including the addition of auxiliary lanes, sidewalks, and bicycle lanes. A 2016 study of the corridor's safety by WSDOT concluded that the outdated design of the roadway had reached its capacity and was in need of immediate improvement to handle expected traffic volumes. An earlier WSDOT study recommended $300 million in projects to widen SR 169 to four or six lanes between Black Diamond and Renton.

The Kummer Bridge was closed between November 2008 and June 2009 for an emergency reconstruction project after the discovery of major ground movement. The $10 million project was funded by the federal government and included a new retaining wall.

== Major intersections ==
The entire route is in King County.

Location	mi	km	Destinations	Notes
Enumclaw	0.00	0.00	SR 164 to SR 410 – Tacoma, Yakima, Mount Rainier	
Maple Valley	11.44	18.41	SR 516 west (Kent–Kangley Road) – Covington, Kent	
Maple Valley	14.17	22.80	To SR 18 (via Southeast 231st Street) – Auburn, North Bend	
Renton	25.23	40.60	I-405 – Tacoma, Bellevue, Everett	
Renton	25.26	40.65	SR 900 (Bronson Way, Sunset Boulevard NE)	
1.000 mi = 1.609 km; 1.000 km = 0.621 mi
