= West Valley Freeway =

West Valley Freeway may refer to:

- West Valley Freeway (California), designated State Route 85
- West Valley Freeway (Washington), designated State Route 167
