= Puget Sound Regional Fire Authority =

Fire department in Washington, US

Operational area
- Country: United States
- State: Washington
- County: King County

Agency overview
- Established: 1892
- Annual calls: 26,636 (2018)
- Employees: 326 (2019)
- Annual budget: $68,309,369 (2019)
- Staffing: Career
- Fire chief: Brian Carson
- EMS level: ALS
- IAFF: 1747

Facilities and equipment
- Battalions: 4
- Stations: 18
- Engines: 11
- Trucks: 2
- Quints: 2
- Rescues: 1
- Ambulances: 2
- Tenders: 1
- HAZMAT: 2
- Wildland: 2
- Rescue boats: 2

Website
- Official website
- IAFF website

The Puget Sound Regional Fire Authority, operating as Puget Sound Fire provides fire protection and emergency medical services to communities south of Seattle and east of Puget Sound in King County, Washington. The department is responsible for services in the communities of Covington, Kent, Maple Valley, SeaTac, Tukwila, and the unincorporated King County Fire Districts #37 and #43. Prior to the incorporation of Tukwila Fire Department through an agreement with the city of Tukwila in January 2023 In total, Puget Sound Fire's service area was 108.81 square miles (281.8 km^{2}) with a population of over 225,000. The new statistics are still being compiled as of 03/29/2023.

== History ==
Originally founded in 1892 as the Kent Fire Department, Puget Sound Fire has grown to serve new communities throughout its history. The department was rebranded as the Puget Sound Regional Fire Authority from the Kent Regional Fire Authority on January 1, 2017.

In 2018 the department responded to 26,636 service calls of which 20,489 were for EMS services.

== Stations and apparatus ==
As of January 2023, Puget Sound Fire has 17 stations located throughout the district (Washington state, King County Fire District 7, Zone 3). In addition to housing firefighters, Station 74 is also home to the headquarters and administrative offices of the department. Stations 75 and 76 are also home to King County Medic units operated by the county and not the department.

| Fire Station # | Municipality | Engine Company | Ladder Company or Quint Company | Aid Car or Medic Unit | Special Unit | Chief Unit |
|---|---|---|---|---|---|---|
| 45 | SeaTac | Engine 345 | | | Rescue Boat 345 | |
| 46 | SeaTac | Engine 347 Reserve Engine | Ladder 346 | | Explorer Unit 346 Rehabilitation Unit 302 | Battalion Chief 345 (West Battalion) Reserve Battalion Chief |
| 51 | Tukwila | | Ladder 351 | | | |
| 52 | Tukwila | Engine 352 Reserve Engine | | Aid Car 352 | | |
| 53 | Tukwila | Engine 353 | | | | |
| 54 | Tukwila | Engine 354 | | | | |
| 71 | Kent | Engine 371 | | Aid Car 371 Reserve Aid Car | Rescue Boat 371 | |
| 72 | Kent | Engine 372 | | Reserve Aid Car | Zone 3 Mass Casualty Incident Unit 372 | |
| 73 | Kent | Engine 373 Reserve Engine | | | Foam Trailer 373 | |
| 74 | Kent | Engine 374 Reserve Engine | Ladder 374 | Aid Car 374 | Rescue 374 Care 374 | District Chief 307 |
| 75 | Kent | | Quint 375 | King County Medic Unit | Hazmat and Decontamination Unit 375 ATV 375 | |
| 76 | Kent | | Quint 376 | King County Medic Unit | Hazmat Unit 376 | Reserve Battalion Chief |
| 77 | Kent | Engine 377 Reserve Engine | | | | |
| 78 | Covington | Engine 378 Reserve Engine Reserve Engine | | | Brush 378 | |
| 80 | Maple Valley | Engine 380 | | | Brush 380 Tender 380 | |
| 81 | Maple Valley | Engine 381 | | | Rescue 381 ATV 381 | Battalion Chief 381 (East Battalion) |
| 83 | Maple Valley | Engine 383 | | | | |
