= Washington State Route 18 =

State highway in King County, Washington, US

State Route 18
- SR 18 highlighted in red

Route information
- Maintained by WSDOT
- Length: 28.41 mi (45.72 km)
- Existed: 1964–present

Major junctions
- West end: SR 99 in Federal Way
- SR 161 in Federal Way; I-5 in Federal Way; SR 167 in Auburn; SR 164 in Auburn; SR 516 in Covington; SR 169 in Maple Valley
- East end: I-90 near Snoqualmie

Location
- Country: United States
- State: Washington
- County: King

Highway system
- State highways in Washington; Interstate; US; State; Scenic; Pre-1964; 1964 renumbering; Former
← SR 17	→ SR 19

State Route 18 (SR 18) is a 28.41-mile-long (45.72 km) state highway in the U.S. state of Washington, serving southeastern King County. The highway travels northeast, primarily as a controlled-access freeway, from an intersection with SR 99 and an interchange with Interstate 5 (I-5) in Federal Way through the cities of Auburn, Kent, Covington, and Maple Valley. SR 18 becomes a two-lane rural highway near Tiger Mountain as it approaches its eastern terminus, an interchange with I-90 near the cities of Snoqualmie and North Bend.

SR 18 was established during the 1964 state highway renumbering as the successor to the Auburn–Federal Way branch of Primary State Highway 5 (PSH 5) and the Auburn–North Bend branch of PSH 2, which were created in 1931 and 1949, respectively. The initial two-lane highway, named the Echo Lake Cutoff, was completed in December 1964 after the opening of a section around Tiger Mountain, which would later be the site of over 170 accidents in the 1980s. SR 18 was gradually widened into a four-lane freeway beginning in Auburn in 1992 and most recently finishing in Federal Way in 2007. The highway around Tiger Mountain and near the I-90 interchange remains a two-lane road, with a funded project planned to re-build the existing interchange with I-90.

== Route description ==
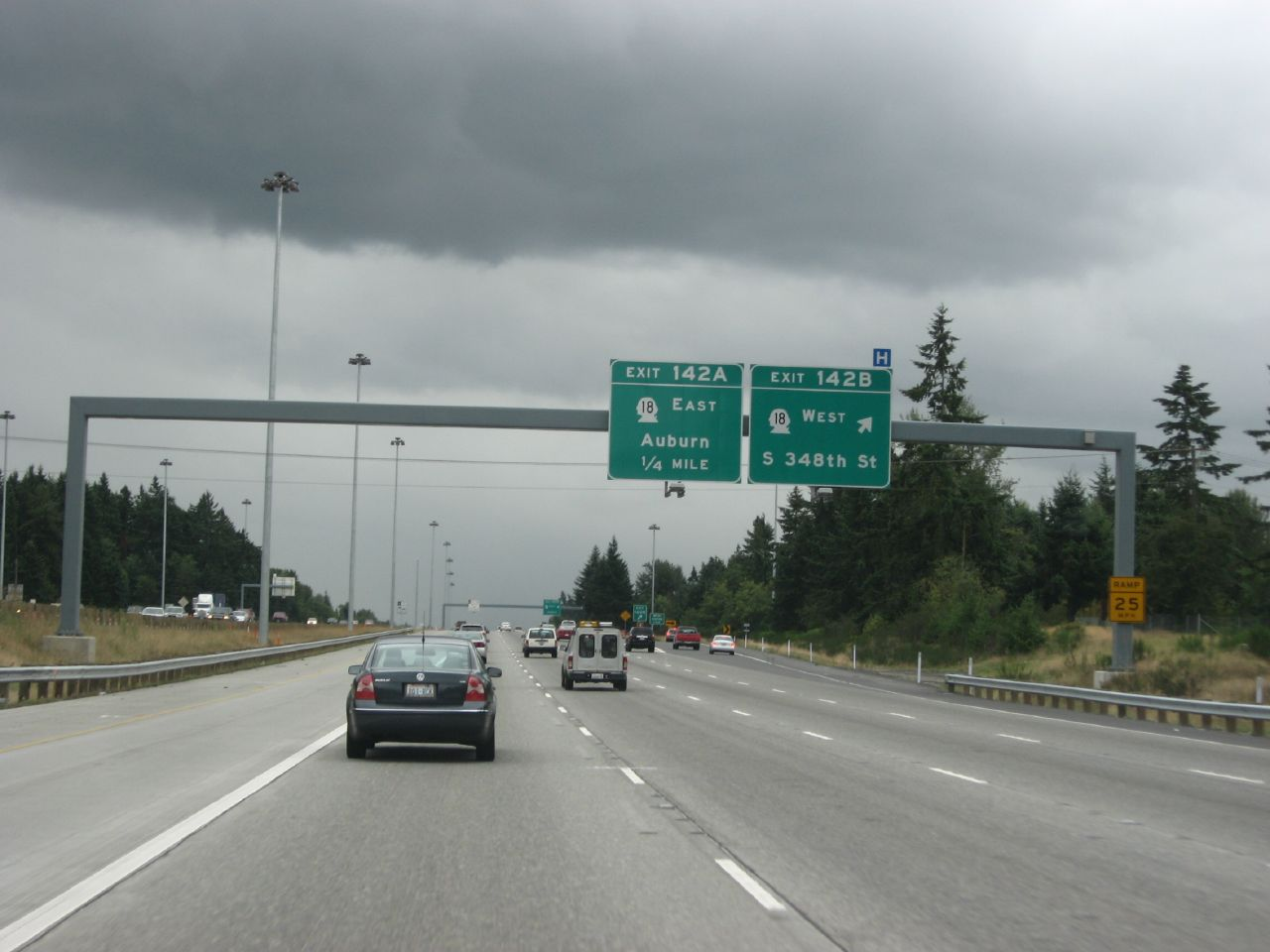
I-5 southbound in Federal Way, approaching its interchange with SR 18

SR 18 begins as South 348th Street at a signalized intersection with SR 99, named the Pacific Highway, in the city of Federal Way. The highway travels due east through an intersection with the Enchanted Parkway, which carries SR 161 southwards towards Wild Waves Theme Park and the city of Puyallup, to a hybrid cloverleaf-stack interchange with I-5, providing access to Seattle and Vancouver, British Columbia to the north, and Tacoma and Portland, Oregon to the south. SR 18 becomes a full four-lane freeway as it descends into Peasley Canyon east of a diamond interchange with Weyerhaeuser Way, located south of the Weyerhaeuser headquarters.

After exiting the canyon, the freeway enters the city of Auburn and intersects West Valley Highway, signed as SR 181 until 1991, and SR 167, named the Valley Freeway, in a complex hybrid partial cloverleaf and diamond interchange. SR 18 continues east past The Outlet Collection Seattle and over the mixed-use Interurban Trail as it approaches a folded cloverleaf interchange with C Street Southwest and a partial cloverleaf interchange with SR 164 at Auburn Way. The freeway then crosses over the Green River into unincorporated King County.

SR 18 continues northeast along the southeastern city limits of Kent, through an interchange with Southeast 304th Street, which serves Green River College, towards Covington. The freeway intersects SR 516 in a diamond interchange and 256th Street Southeast in a partial cloverleaf interchange before leaving Covington. SR 18 intersects Southeast 231st Street in a diamond interchange located north of Maple Valley, providing a connection to SR 169, while the freeway travels on an overpass over SR 169 towards a partial cloverleaf interchange with 244th Avenue. The SR 18 freeway ends northeast of a partial cloverleaf interchange with Issaquah-Hobart Road at the base of Tiger Mountain, becoming a two-lane highway with at-grade intersections for the remainder of its route. The highway travels on the east side of Tiger Mountain in the Issaquah Alps and provides access to a trailhead in Tiger Mountain State Forest before it reaches its eastern terminus, a diamond interchange with I-90 located west of North Bend. I-90 provides access to the cities of Issaquah and Seattle to the west and North Bend and Spokane to the east, traveling over the Cascade Mountains through Snoqualmie Pass. The roadway continues past the interchange as Snoqualmie Parkway into the city of Snoqualmie, intersecting SR 202.

Every year, the Washington State Department of Transportation (WSDOT) conducts a series of surveys on its highways in the state to measure traffic volume. This is expressed in terms of annual average daily traffic (AADT), which is a measure of traffic volume for any average day of the year. In 2012, WSDOT calculated that the busiest section of SR 18 was its interchange with SR 167 in Auburn, serving 97,000 vehicles, while the least busiest section of the highway was its eastern terminus at I-90, serving 19,000 vehicles. SR 18 is designated as part of the National Highway System for its whole length, classifying it as important to the national economy, defense, and mobility. WSDOT designates the entire route of SR 18 as a Highway of Statewide Significance, which includes highways that connect major communities in the state of Washington.

== History ==
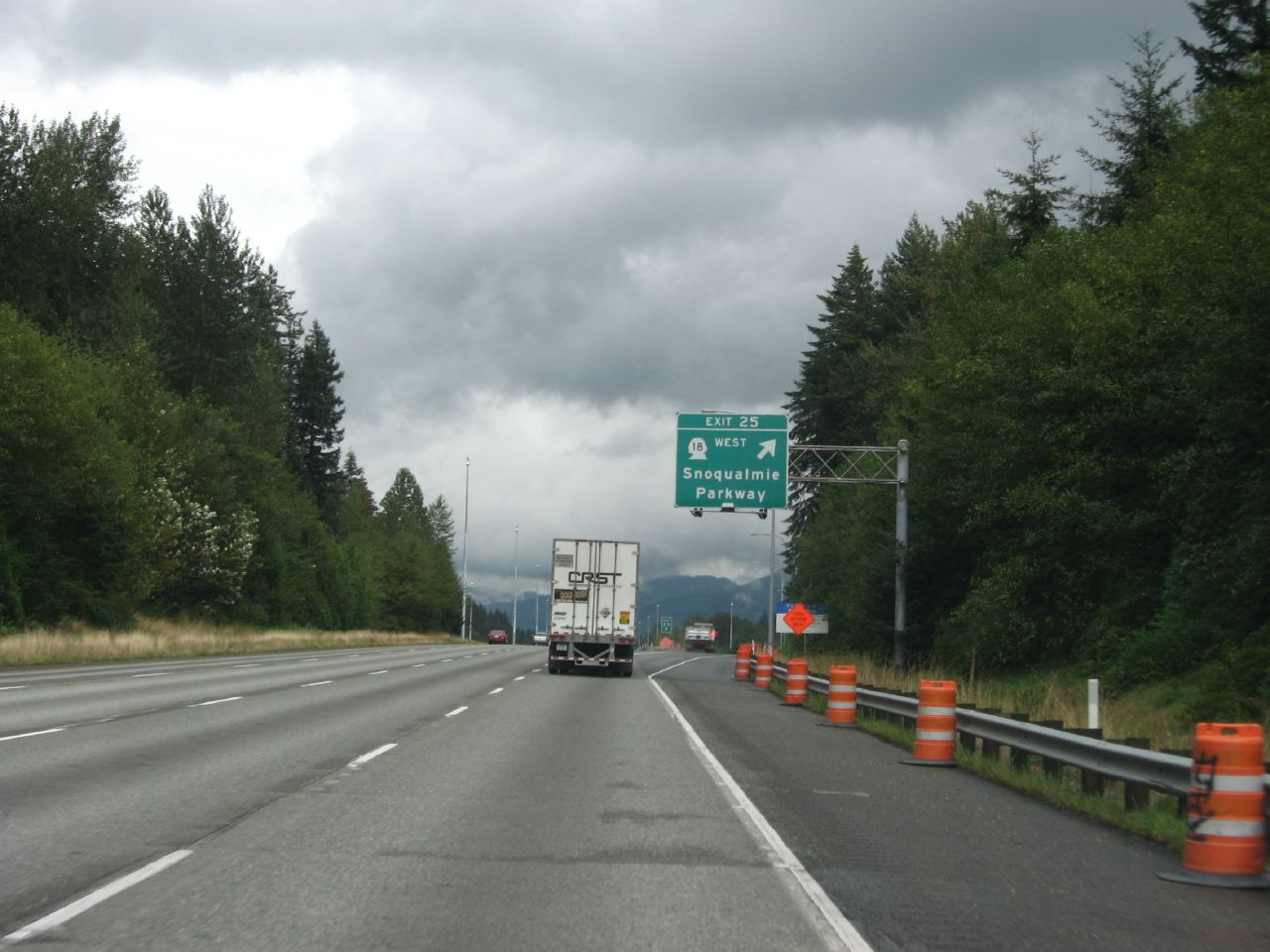
I-90 eastbound approaching its interchange with SR 18 near Snoqualmie

The modern corridor that SR 18 follows was added to the state highway system in 1931 as a branch of State Road 5 that ran from the main highway in Auburn to State Road 1 and U.S. Route 99 (US 99) in Federal Way via Peasley Canyon. The branch was retained by State Road 5 when it was re-designated as PSH 5 as a new highway code was established in 1937. A branch of PSH 2 was designated in 1949, traveling southwest from North Bend, around Tiger Mountain and through Auburn before ending at a junction with PSH 1 and US 99 in Milton. The designation had been the result of lobbying from business leaders in Tacoma, who sought a direct connection to Snoqualmie Pass that would improve access to Eastern Washington.

Construction on the Echo Lake Cutoff Road, along the route of the North Bend–Auburn branch of PSH 2 and the Auburn–Federal Way branch PSH 5, began in 1955. The two-lane highway would cost $9 million (equivalent to $108 million in 2025) and the 32-mile-long (51 km) route was chosen to avoid Tiger Mountain and connect the city of Tacoma to Snoqualmie Pass. The first section, between US 99 and Auburn, was opened on December 19, 1958. SR 18 was designated on the corridor during the 1964 state highway renumbering and codified into state law in 1970, replacing the branches of PSH 2 and PSH 5. The final 7 miles (11.27 km) of the Echo Lake Cutoff, from an entrance to Tiger Mountain State Forest to I-90, was officially opened on December 1, 1964. A new interchange with I-5 in Federal Way was opened to traffic on January 31, 1967, officially completing SR 18.

Expansion of SR 18 from a two-lane rural road to a four-lane controlled-access freeway began in 1992 response to six fatalities in over 170 accidents in a ten-year period, giving the highway a reputation of being a "dangerous roadway". WSDOT widened SR 18 to four lanes and added new interchanges between SR 167 and the Green River within Auburn. The Washington State Legislature briefly planned to toll the new SR 18 freeway in January 1995 to pay off loans for re-construction, but the plan was protested by local residents and rejected months later in May. Additional work was completed in 1997 from the Green River to Southeast 304th Street in Covington, and in 2007 from Covington through Maple Valley and to Issaquah-Hobart Road. The western end of the freeway was extended in Federal Way through Peasley Canyon to I-5 in Federal Way, which was further improved in 2011 with the completion of interchange improvements to the "Federal Way Triangle".

WSDOT is planning to widen the remaining section of SR 18, between Issaquah-Hobart Road south of Tiger Mountain to I-90 near Snoqualmie, to four lanes with a median barrier to separate opposing lanes of traffic and prevent head-on collisions. The western section will include a right-in/right-out interchange at the Tiger Mountain summit; $640 million was approved in the 2022 Move Ahead Washington transportation package. The eastern section from Deep Creek to I-90 was widened to 4 lanes, and the I-90 interchange was rebuilt as part of a separate project completed in 2026; it was originally set to include flyover ramps and a double roundabout, but was later changed to a diverging diamond interchange.

== Major intersections ==
The entire highway is in King County. All exits are unnumbered.

Location	mi	km	Destinations	Notes
Federal Way	0.00	0.00	SR 99 (Pacific Highway)	Continues as South 348th Street
Federal Way	0.21	0.34	SR 161 south (Enchanted Parkway) – Puyallup	
Federal Way	West end of freeway			
Federal Way	0.53	0.85	I-5 – Seattle, Tacoma	
Federal Way	1.30	2.09	Weyerhaeuser Way South	
Auburn	3.22	5.18	West Valley Highway	Former SR 181
Auburn	3.41	5.49	SR 167 (Valley Freeway) – Kent, Renton, Puyallup	No eastbound exit to southbound SR 167; no westbound entrance from northbound SR 167
Auburn	4.35	7.00	C Street Southwest	
Auburn	4.69	7.55	SR 164 east (Auburn Way) – Enumclaw, Auburn	
Auburn	6.97	11.22	Auburn-Black Diamond Road	
	9.30	14.97	Southeast 304th Street, Southeast 312th Street	
Covington	11.92	19.18	SR 516 (Southeast 272nd Street) – Covington	
Covington	13.65	21.97	Southeast 256th Street, Lakepointe Boulevard	
	15.22	24.49	To SR 169 / Southeast 231st Street – Maple Valley	
	17.49	28.15	244th Avenue Southeast	
	20.87	33.59	Issaquah-Hobart Road – Issaquah, Hobart	
East end of freeway
	28.41	45.72	I-90 – Seattle, Spokane	Interchange, continues as Snoqualmie Parkway
1.000 mi = 1.609 km; 1.000 km = 0.621 mi
