= Washington State Route 516 =

State highway in King County, Washington, US

State Route 516

- SR 516 highlighted in red

Route information
- Auxiliary route of I-5
- Maintained by WSDOT
- Length: 16.49 mi (26.54 km)
- Existed: 1964–present

Major junctions
- West end: SR 509 in Des Moines
- SR 99 / SR 509 in Kent; I-5 in Kent; SR 167 in Kent; SR 515 in Kent; SR 18 in Covington
- East end: SR 169 in Maple Valley

Location
- Country: United States
- State: Washington
- County: King

Highway system
- State highways in Washington; Interstate; US; State; Scenic; Pre-1964; 1964 renumbering; Former
← SR 515	→ SR 518

State Route 516 (SR 516) is a 16.49-mile-long (26.54 km) state highway in the U.S. state of Washington, serving communities in southern King County. The highway travels east as the Kent-Des Moines Road and the Kent-Kangley Road from a concurrency with SR 509 in Des Moines through Kent and Covington to an intersection with SR 169 in Maple Valley. SR 516, designated as part of the National Highway System within Kent, intersects three major freeways in the area: Interstate 5 (I-5) in western Kent, SR 167 in downtown Kent, and SR 18 in Covington. The roadway, built in the 1890s, was codified in 1937 as Secondary State Highway 1K (SSH 1K) from Des Moines to Kent and SSH 5A from Kent to Maple Valley. The two highways were combined during the 1964 highway renumbering to form SR 516 on its current route.

== Route description ==
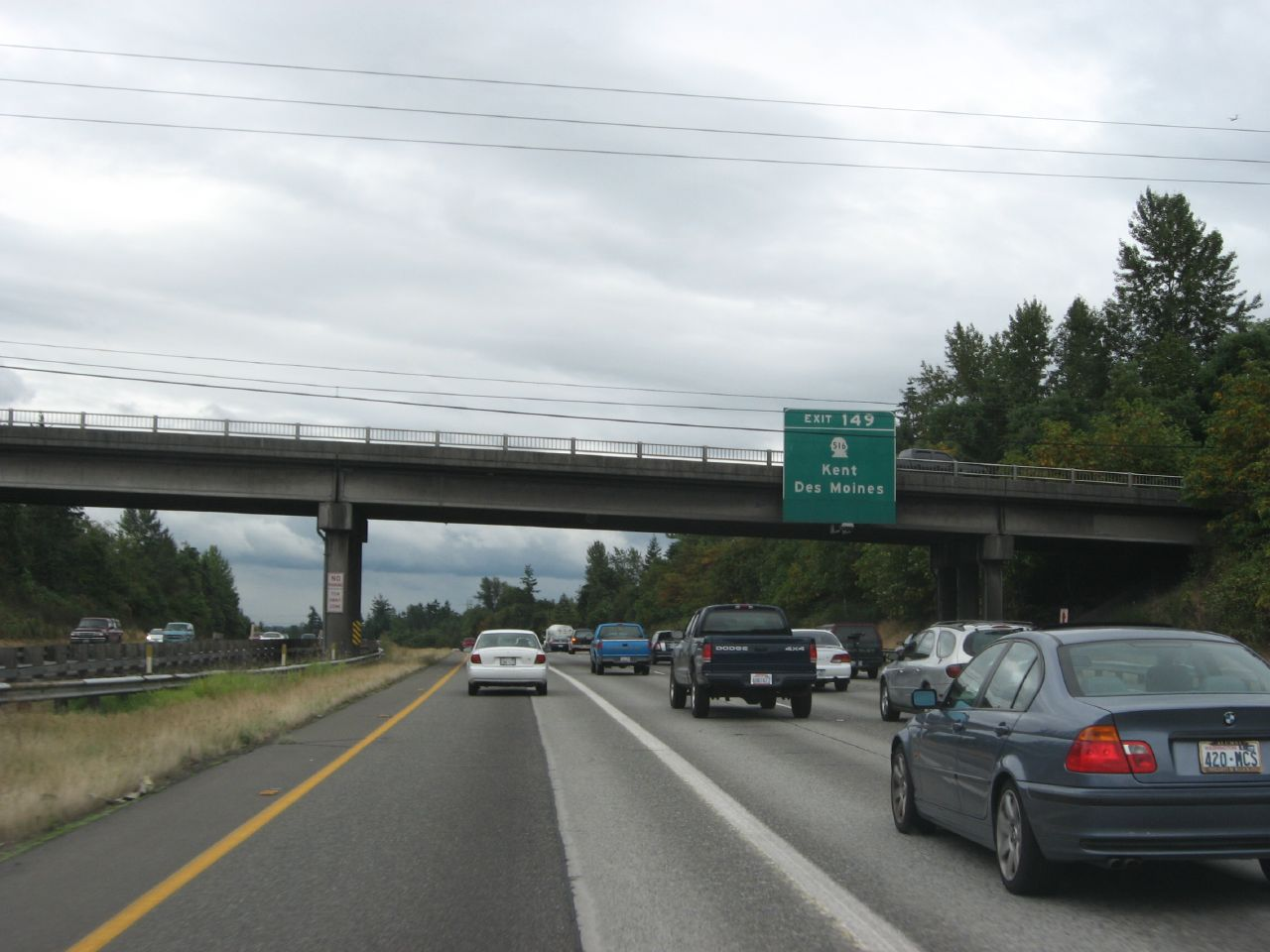
I-5 southbound approaching its interchange with SR 516 in Kent.

SR 516 begins in Des Moines at Marine View Drive as SR 509 turns north towards Burien near the East Passage of Puget Sound. The two concurrent highways travel east on the Kent-Des Moines Road past Highline Community College and Mount Rainier High School to an intersection with SR 99 in western Kent, where SR 509 turns south towards Tacoma. SR 516 then intersects I-5 at a partial cloverleaf interchange and continues east onto a four-lane divided highway over the Green River and its pedestrian and bicycle trail into downtown Kent. The highway serves as the southern terminus of SR 181 before intersecting SR 167 in a diamond interchange at the western edge of downtown Kent. SR 516 shifts south onto Willis Street and crosses the Interurban Trail and a BNSF rail line before turning north onto Central Avenue and east onto Smith Street near Kent Station. The highway travels southeast along Mill Creek onto the Kent-Kangley Road and serves as the southern terminus of SR 515 at Kent-Meridian High School before leaving Kent for Covington. SR 516 passes Lake Meridian as 272nd Street and intersects SR 18 at a diamond interchange located in Covington. The highway continues east past Pipe Lake and into Maple Valley before crossing the Cedar to Green River Trail and ending at an intersection with SR 169.

Every year, the Washington State Department of Transportation (WSDOT) conducts a series of surveys on its highways in the state to measure traffic volume. This is expressed in terms of annual average daily traffic (AADT), which is a measure of traffic volume for any average day of the year. In 2011, WSDOT calculated that the busiest section of the highway was between SR 181 and the SR 167 interchange, serving 38,000 vehicles, while the least busiest section was its western terminus at SR 509, serving 8,900 vehicles. SR 516 between I-5 and SR 167 within western Kent is designated as part of the National Highway System, which includes roadways important to the national economy, defense, and mobility.

== History ==
The Kent-Kangley Road was built as a wagon road by King County by the late 1890s and was upgraded to a paved highway after being codified as two highways during the creation of the primary and secondary state highways system in 1937: SSH 1K and SSH 5A. SSH 1K traveled 12.76 miles (20.54 km) south from U.S. Route 99 and Primary State Highway 1 (PSH 1) through Burien and east through Des Moines to US 99 and PSH 1 in Midway. SSH 5A traveled 14.50 miles (23.34 km) east from US 99 and PSH 1 in Midway across the Green River into Kent, intersecting SSH 5M, PSH 5, and SSH 5C, before ending at the Enumclaw–Renton branch of PSH 5 in Maple Valley. The two highways were combined during the 1964 highway renumbering to form SR 516 and codified into law in 1970. The highway traveled east from SR 509 in Des Moines through I-5 at Midway, SR 167 in Kent, and SR 18 in Covington to SR 169 in Maple Valley. SR 509 was re-aligned in 1991 onto SR 516 and SR 99, forming new concurrencies, until the completion of a new north–south freeway.

== Major intersections ==
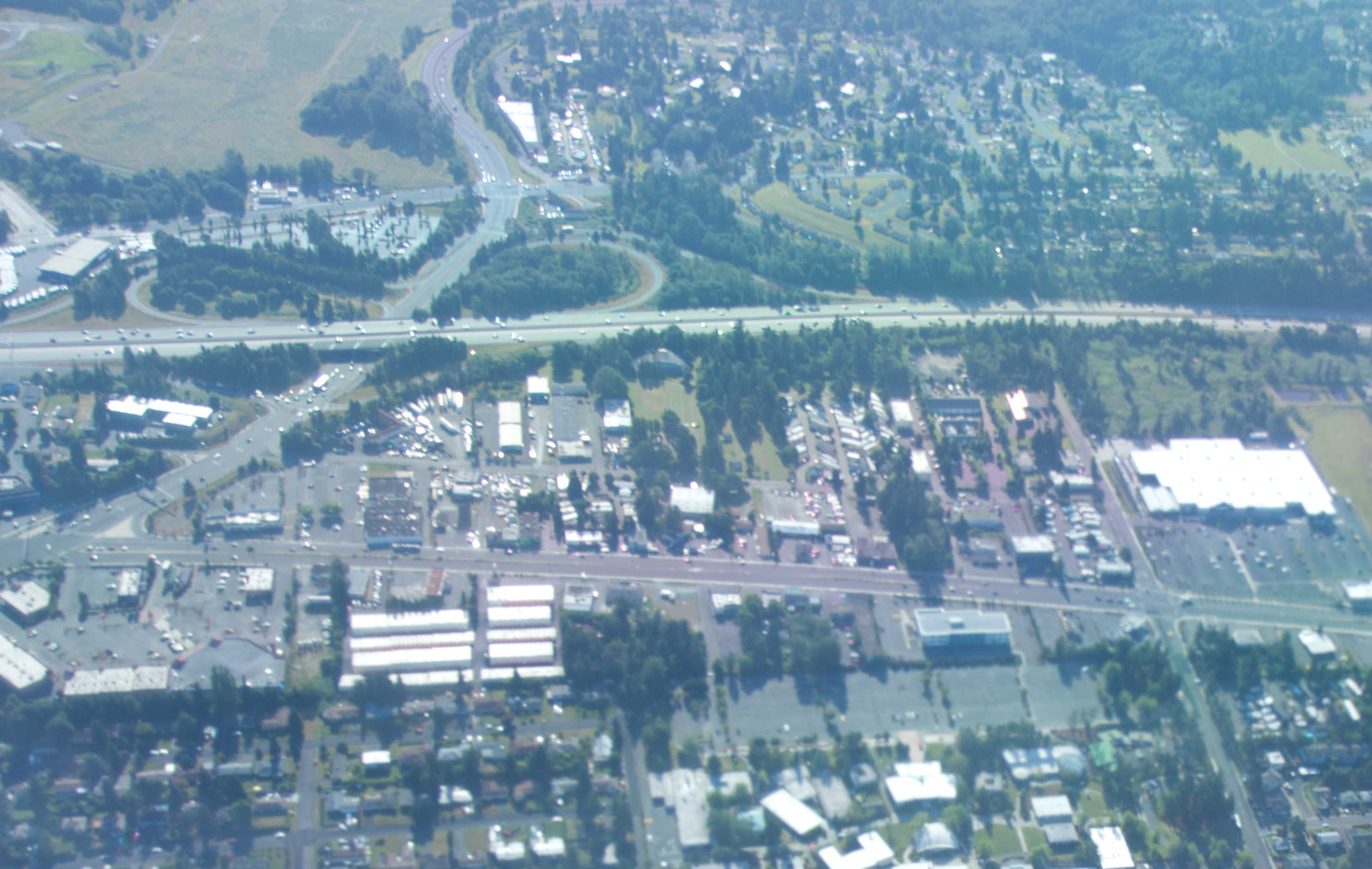
An aerial view of Des Moines and Kent looking east as SR 516 intersects SR 99 and I-5

The entire highway is in King County.

Location	mi	km	Destinations	Notes
Des Moines	0.00	0.00	SR 509 north (Marine View Drive) – Burien	Western terminus, west end of SR 509 overlap
Kent	1.79	2.88	SR 99 (Pacific Highway) / SR 509 south – Federal Way, SeaTac	East end of SR 509 overlap
Kent	2.02	3.25	I-5 – Seattle, Portland	Interchange
Kent	4.79	7.71	SR 181 north (Valley Highway)	
Kent	4.92	7.92	SR 167 – Renton, Auburn	Interchange
Kent	7.61	12.25	SR 515 north (104th Avenue)	
Covington	11.73	18.88	SR 18 – Auburn, North Bend	Interchange
Maple Valley	16.49	26.54	SR 169 – Renton, Enumclaw	Eastern terminus
1.000 mi = 1.609 km; 1.000 km = 0.621 mi: Concurrency terminus
