= Newport, Bellevue =

Neighborhood in Bellevue, Washington, United States

Coordinates: 47.5619194°N 122.1927092°W

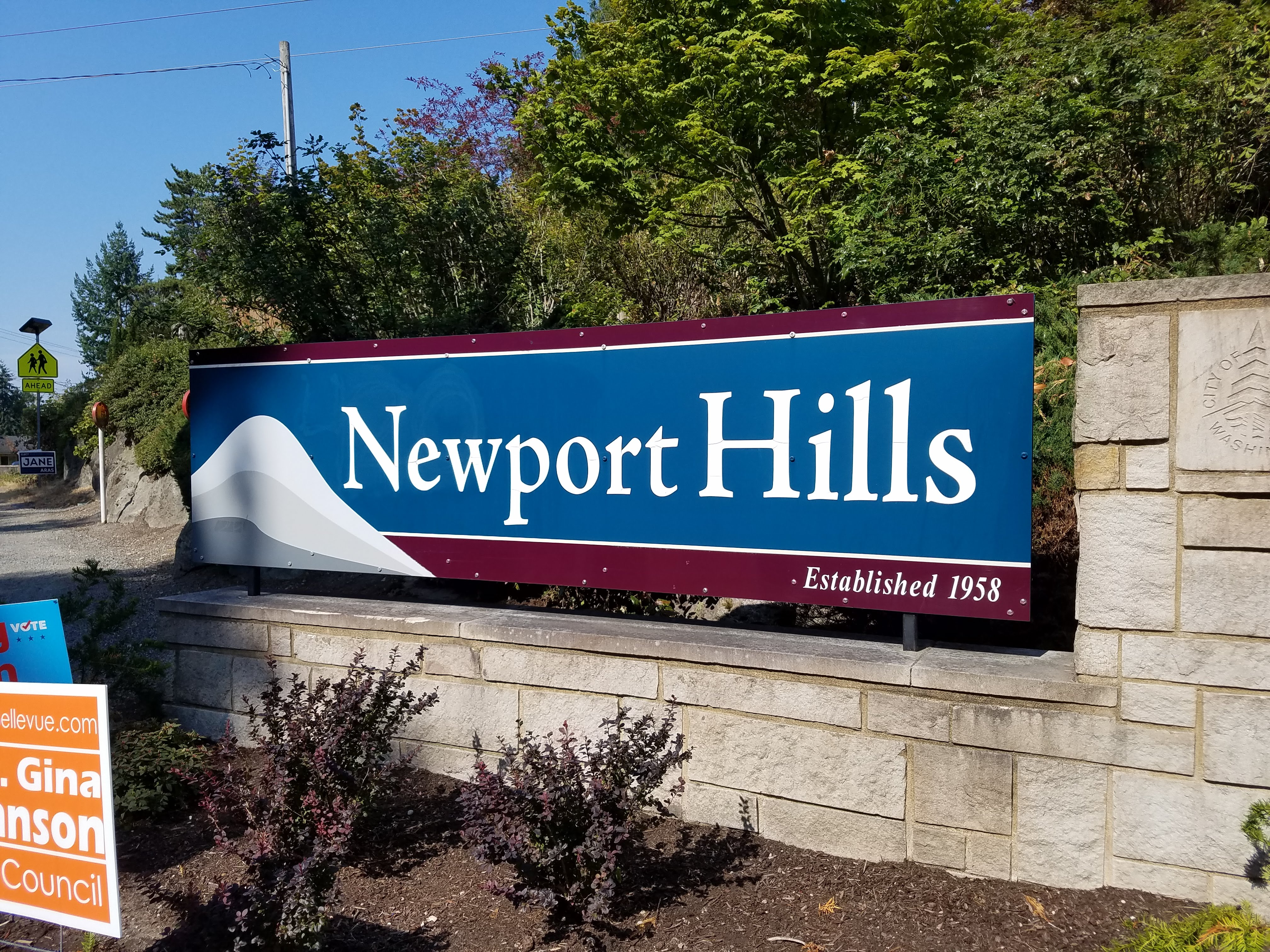
Newport Hills neighborhood sign in Bellevue, Washington

Newport is a neighborhood in Bellevue, Washington. It comprises the Newport Shores district along the Lake Washington shore, and the Newport Hills/Lake Heights areas east of Interstate 405.

Much of Newport west of Interstate 405 was annexed by Bellevue in 1957. Most of Newport east of Interstate 405 was annexed later, in 1993.
