= Nickel Project =

The Nickel Project refers to a transportation funding initiative enacted by the Washington State Legislature in 2003. The program's slogan, “It's your Nickel, Watch it Work,” reflects its funding mechanism and commitment to infrastructure improvement.

== Funding ==
The Nickel Project was designed to generate $3.9 billion over a ten-year period to finance 158 transportation projects across Washington. The funding was sourced through:

- Gas Tax Increase — A 5-cent per gallon increase in the state gasoline tax.
- Heavy Truck Fees — A 15% increase in gross weight fees for heavy trucks.
- Vehicle Sales Tax — A 0.3% increase in the sales tax on motor vehicles.

These revenue streams were allocated to the Nickel Account, dedicated exclusively to the specified transportation projects.

== Project scope ==
The 158 projects funded under the Nickel Project aimed to address various transportation needs, including:

- Congestion relief — Allocating $2.6 billion to alleviate traffic congestion in critical areas.
- Safety enhancements — Implementing measures to improve road safety.
- Infrastructure preservation — Maintaining and upgrading existing transportation infrastructure.
