= Lake Meridian =

Lake in King County, Washington, United States

- Location within Washington (state) Location within the United States
- Location: Kent, Washington
- Coordinates: 47°21′48″N 122°09′11″W
- Basin countries: United States
- Surface elevation: 372 ft (113 m)

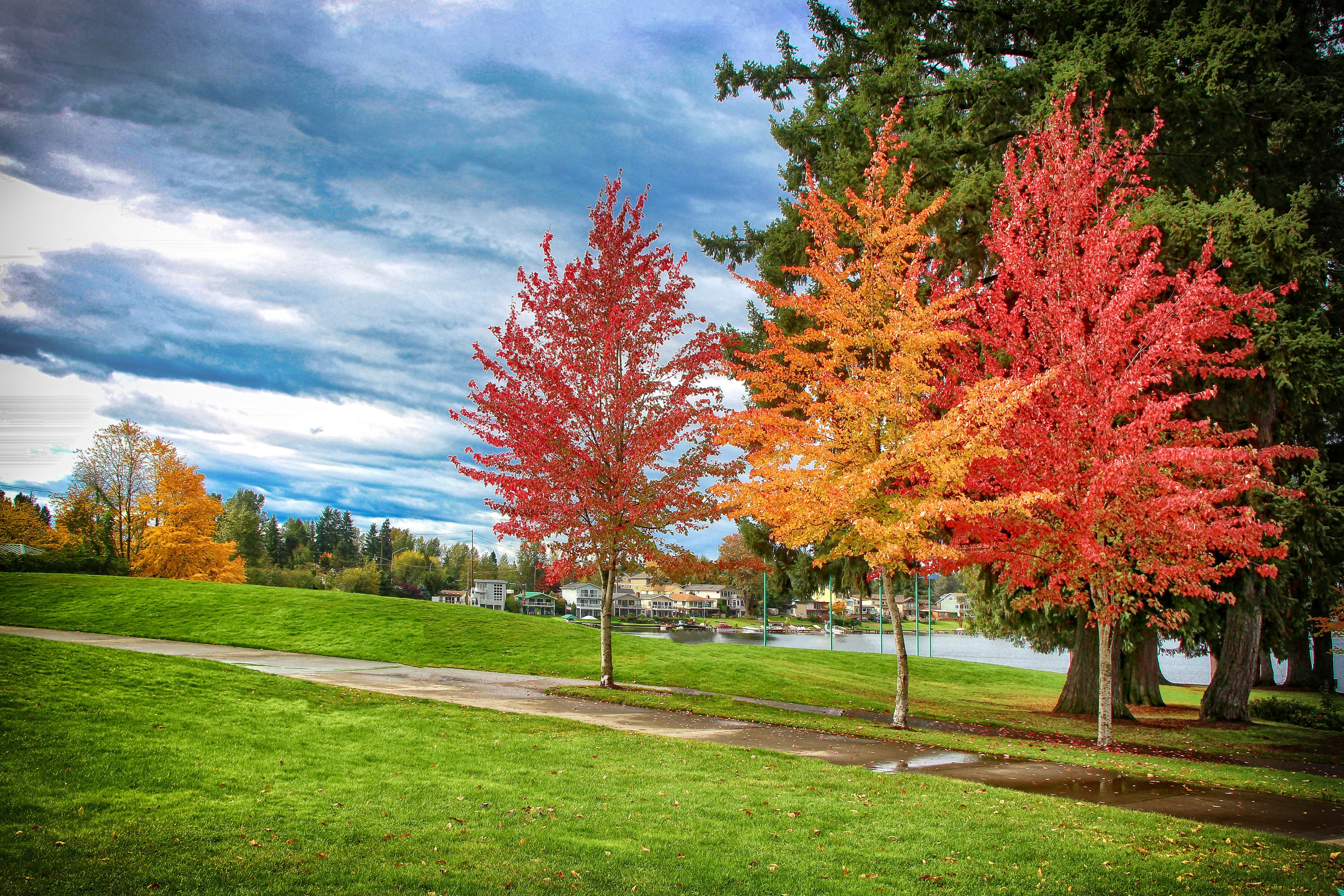
Lake Meridian park with Lake Meridian in the background.

Lake Meridian is a fresh-water lake located in the city of Kent, Washington. One among the few lakes in King County allowing motorized boating, Lake Meridian is an urban lake, surrounded by homes and located just off the Kent-Kangley Road on Kent's East Hill.

Fed primarily by springs at the west end of the lake, Lake Meridian empties at the east end of the lake into a small stream that eventually connects to the Little Soos Creek, which in turn eventually feeds into the larger Green River via a number of other streams and eventually ends up in Elliott Bay. Lake Meridian is a recreation area offering fishing, boating, canoeing and a variety of water sports. Patrolled in the summer months by the Kent Police Department boat cruisers, Lake Meridian is part of the City of Kent's Lake Meridian Park, which is visited by thousands each Summer season.

Lake Meridian features a large covered shelter, a playfield, restrooms, swimming beach, fishing, and boat launch. The park capacity is 120 people.
