= Valley Medical Center (Washington) =

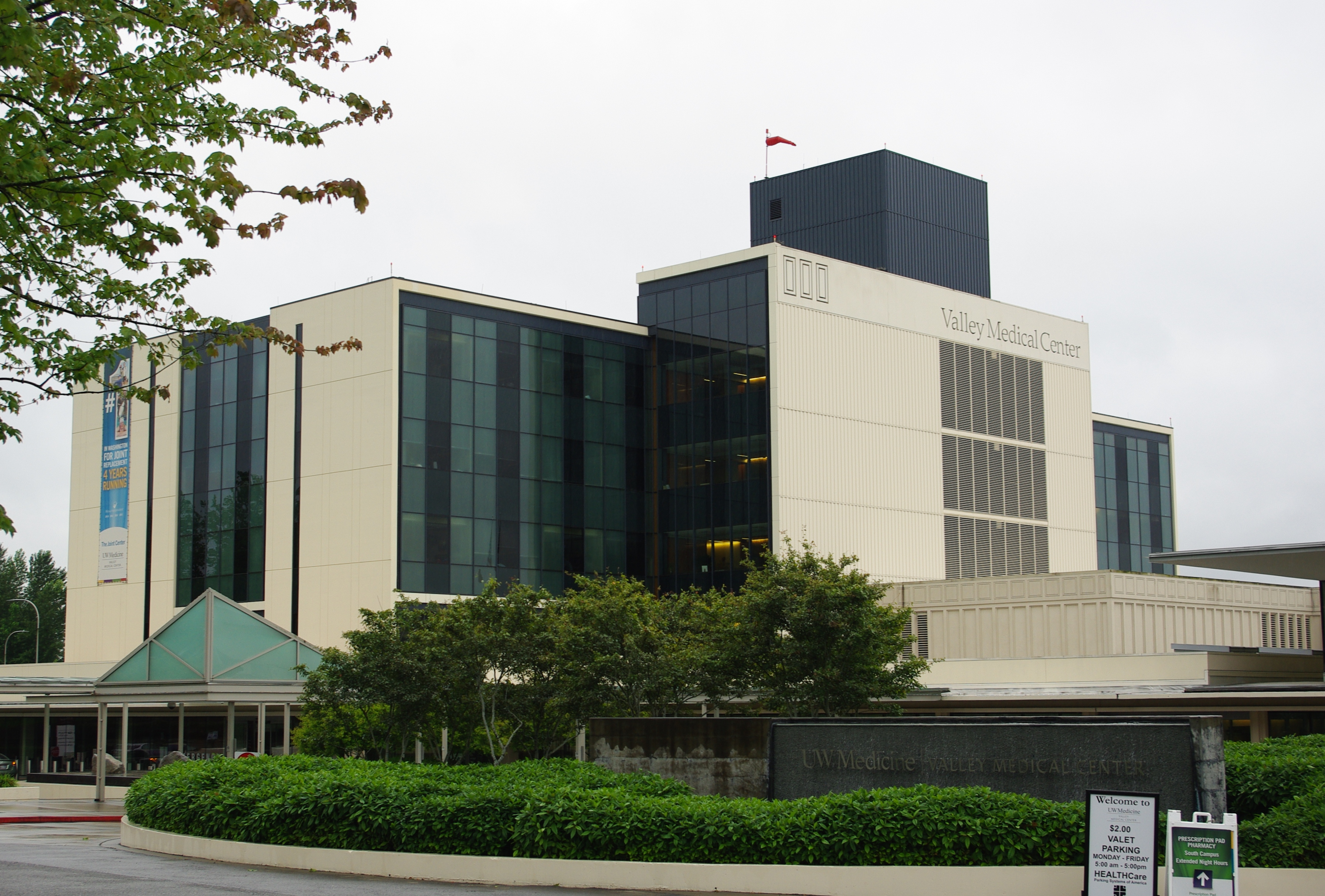
- The Margarita Prentice Trauma Center at Valley Medical Center

Geography
- Location: 400 South 43rd Street, Renton, Washington, United States
- Coordinates: 47°26′34″N 122°12′51″W

Organization
- Care system: Public
- Type: General
- Network: UW Medicine

Services
- Emergency department: Yes; Level III trauma center
- Beds: 341

History
- Former names: Renton Hospital; Valley General Hospital
- Opened: 1945

Links
- Website: valleymed.org
- Lists: Hospitals in Washington state

Valley Medical Center is a public hospital and medical system in Renton, Washington, United States. It was established in 1945 as Renton Hospital and was incorporated as a public hospital district two years later. The hospital was renamed to Valley General Hospital and moved to a new suburban campus in 1969. Valley Medical Center has 341 beds at its main campus and operates several clinics and specialty facilities in southern King County. It employs over 3,800 people and has been part of the UW Medicine system since 2011.

== History ==
Bronson Hospital, the first hospital in Renton, was founded in 1911 by Adolph Bronson, who remained its operator until his death in 1938. The facility was unable to serve the needs of the city after it underwent a major population boom in the 1940s, which led to calls for a modern hospital. Renton Hospital was opened on April 15, 1945, and was constructed by the Federal Works Agency as part of wartime measures to increase local medical capacity. It initially had three buildings: the main hospital, arranged in a "wagon wheel" with seven spoke-like wings and 100 beds; the nurses' quarters; and a heating plant. It cost $600,000 to construct and was designed by Seattle architect George W. Stoddard. The "wagon wheel" design, intended to disperse the impact of a bombing, was later an impediment to patient care and efficiency.

The hospital was initially operated by a nonprofit organization instead of the federal government, who only financed its construction. King County Public Hospital District 1, the first hospital district in Washington, was created in December 1947 to operate Renton Hospital after a referendum by Renton-area residents was approved by a 10-to-1 margin. The hospital was renamed to Valley General Hospital in 1965 amid plans to replace the Renton campus with a more modern facility that would be partially funded by the federal Hill-Harris Act of 1963. The district was expanded beyond Renton and Kent to include parts of Auburn and Tukwila. In November 1966, voters in the hospital district approved $7 million in bonds to finance a new, larger hospital on a campus south of Renton. The original Renton Hospital site is now home to a McLendon Hardware store.

Construction of the new Valley General Hospital, which comprised four wings with 200 beds and laboratory space, began in July 1967. The project's completion was delayed by several weeks due to inclement weather, three labor strikes, and changes to the design to expand the number of beds. It opened in November 1969 after a further three months of delays due to further construction issues. The facility was built on a 25-acre (10 ha) campus overlooking State Route 167 and was designed by architect Edward Durell Stone. The three-story precast concrete building was arranged in four wings that had a total of 260 beds, each in single rooms that had an outdoor deck or patio, along with laboratories and surgical facilities equipped for automatic washing. Valley General Hospital also opened its first 24-hour emergency room, which had 16,000 visitors in 1972 and later 50,000 by 1985. Funding to improve the emergency department at the hospital was approved by the district's voters in 1977.

The hospital was renamed to Valley Medical Center in 1984 as it transitioned from general practice to specialty care. A decade-long expansion program that began in the mid-1970s added a birthing center, a pediatric unit, and a radiation oncology center. The number of beds also increased to 303, with some in shared rooms. Valley Medical Center opened its first off-site clinic in 1988 at a shopping center in Newcastle. A pyschiatric wing with 40 beds opened in November 1989 and was the second-largest facility of its kind in King County. A further expansion added office towers and additional parking space to the hospital complex. The expansion programs were initially financed by patient fees, but Valley Medical Center later sought an increase in its property tax levy in the 1990s for new programs. The levy increase would require cuts to other special districts, such as fire departments, due to a state cap on property taxes. The property tax levy was rejected by voters in November 1994. Universal Health Services later offered to acquire Valley Medical Center or form an alliance with their nearby private hospital, Auburn General Hospital.

Valley Medical Center placed a large property tax increase on the April 26, 2005, ballot that would increase its annual rate by 600 percent. The levy was approved by 54 percent of voters, but a proposed expansion of the hospital district into Maple Valley and Black Diamond was heavily rejected the following year. The hospital's administrator was fined $120,000 by the Washington State Public Disclosure Commission for a violation of the state's campaign finance laws during both campaigns due to undisclosed reimbursements to pay for advertising and polling. Valley Medical Center opened the seven-story South Tower on its campus in February 2010 with a new emergency room and trauma center. The facility was named the Margarita Prentice Trauma Center and handled more than 75,000 annual emergency room visits by 2013. The hospital entered into a strategic alliance with UW Medicine, operator of Harborview Medical Center and University of Washington Medical Center in Seattle, on July 1, 2011. Valley Medical Center would remain operated by the public hospital district and its commissioners, but transferred decision-making power to the UW Medicine board of directors. The transfer was the subject of a lawsuit filed by the public hospital district's commissioners in 2012, which was dismissed by a King County Superior Court judge and unsuccessfully appealed.

In 2025, Valley Medical Center announced that it would close five clinics and two inpatient units at its hospital as part of the state government's budget cuts and the loss of federal Medicaid reimbursement.
