= Franklin, Washington =

Ghost town in Washington (state)

- Ghost town
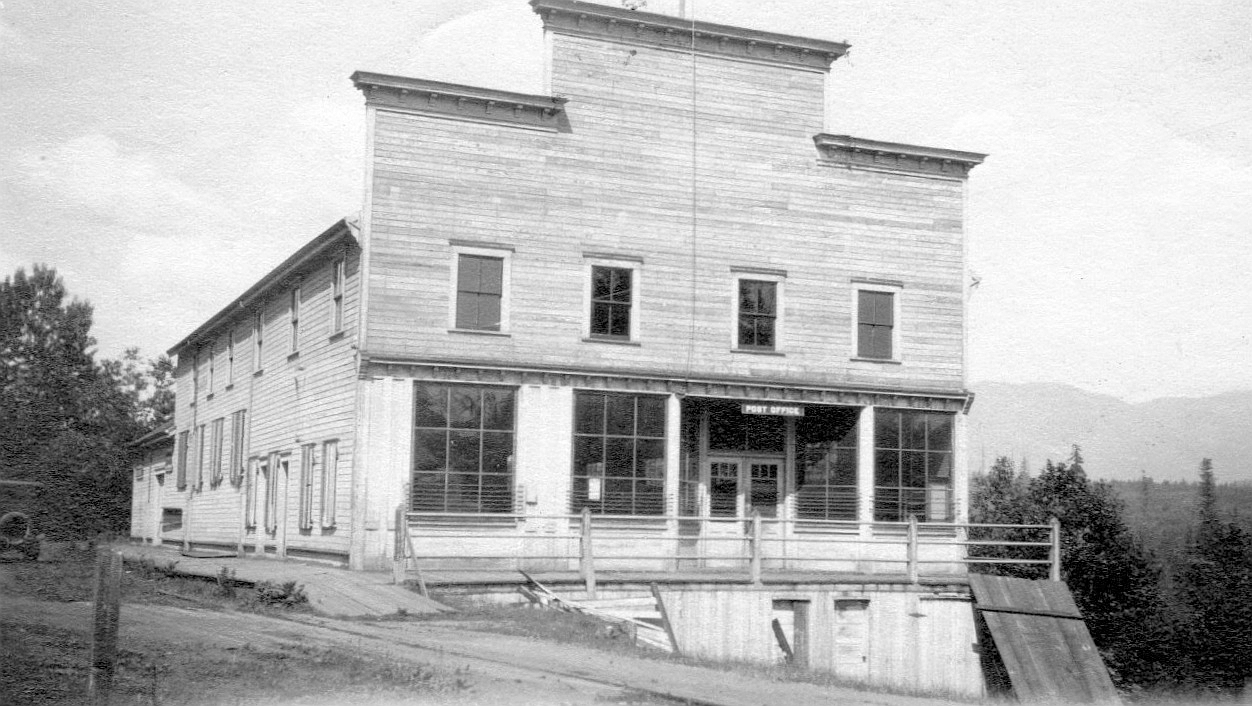
- Post office in Franklin (circa 1920)

- Location within Washington (state) Location within the United States
- Coordinates: 47°18′11″N 121°58′16″W
- Country: United States
- State: Washington
- County: King
- Established: 1880s
- Time zone: UTC-8 (Pacific (PST))
  - Summer (DST): UTC-7 (PDT)

Franklin was a coal mining town located in east King County, Washington, near the current so-called Hanging Gardens on the Green River, about 1 mile (1.6 km) east of Black Diamond.

== History ==
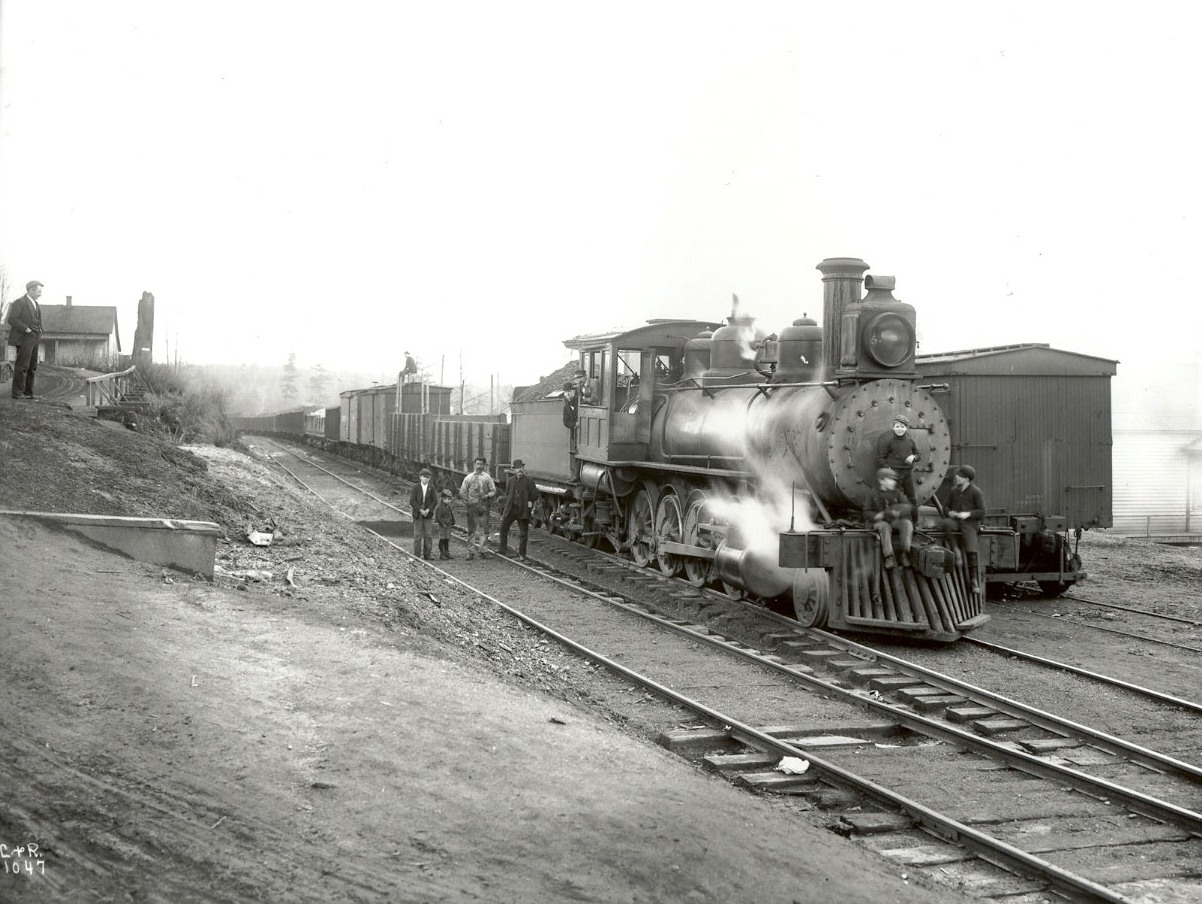
Railroad in Franklin (1902)

The community was established in the 1880s, with a post office established by 1886. In May 1891, labor recruiters brought African-Americans to Franklin from Missouri, Illinois, Kentucky, and Tennessee with offers of good paying jobs and free transportation. The white miners who were on strike took exception to the African-American strikebreakers and tensions grew for a month and a half. In early July, a riot broke out resulting in the deaths of two people and the Governor called out the National Guard to restore order.

In 1885 the Seattle and Walla Walla Railroad was extended from Black Diamond to the town, allowing most of the coal to be shipped to San Francisco. On August 24, 1894, the worst mine disaster in King County history occurred at the Oregon Improvement Company mine in Franklin. A fire caused thirty-seven miners to suffocate in the mine. A jury later found that the fire had been intentionally set, but the person responsible had also perished in the disaster.

By the early twentieth century, demand fell and mining became more difficult, causing the mine to shut down. The post office closed in 1916. By 1919 nearly all mining had ceased at Franklin and residents vacated, though a few families including the Moore family remained behind. Ernest Moore later wrote a book about his African-American family's experiences in The Coal Miner Who Came West (1982).

From the late 1940s through 1971, Palmer Coking Coal Company mined both surface and underground coal in and around the town site of Franklin. This mining ended in late March 1971 when a coal car bridge across the Green River was blasted in a ceremony attended by many local dignitaries. In 1984-1985 the Green River Community College archaeology department, led by Gerald Hedlund and Mark Vernon, conducted digs at the abandoned town site. The report, From Smoke to Mist: An archeological study of Franklin, WA. - A Turn of the Century Company Coal Town was published in 1994 which in turn relied on research by historian John Hanscom.
