= Washington State Route 900 =

State highway in King County, Washington, US

State Route 900

- Map of King County in western Washington with SR 900 highlighted in red

Route information
- Auxiliary route of I-90
- Maintained by WSDOT
- Length: 16.20 mi (26.07 km)
- Existed: 1964–present

Major junctions
- West end: I-5 in Tukwila
- SR 167 in Renton; I-405 / SR 169 in Renton
- East end: I-90 in Issaquah

Location
- Country: United States
- State: Washington
- County: King

Highway system
- State highways in Washington; Interstate; US; State; Scenic; Pre-1964; 1964 renumbering; Former
← SR 823	→ SR 902

State Route 900 (SR 900) is a state highway serving part of King County, Washington, United States. It travels 16 miles (26 km) between southern Seattle and the Eastside suburbs of Renton and Issaquah, separated by the Issaquah Alps. The highway terminates to the west at an interchange with Interstate 5 (I-5) in Tukwila and to the east at I-90 in Issaquah, and also has intermediate junctions with I-405 and SR 167 in Renton. It has carried the memorial designation of Martin Luther King Jr. Way within Renton west of SR 515 since December 2025.

SR 900 was created in the 1964 state highway renumbering, but the corridor had been part of the state highway system since 1909. It was originally a section of the Sunset Highway, the main cross-state route between Seattle and Spokane and was designated as U.S. Route 10 (US 10) in 1926. After the opening of the Lake Washington Floating Bridge, US 10 was moved to a new highway and the former alignment through Renton became an alternate route and a branch of Primary State Highway 2 that was replaced by SR 900. The highway originally terminated at an interchange with I-90 in Seattle's Rainier Valley, but was truncated in 1991.

== Route description ==
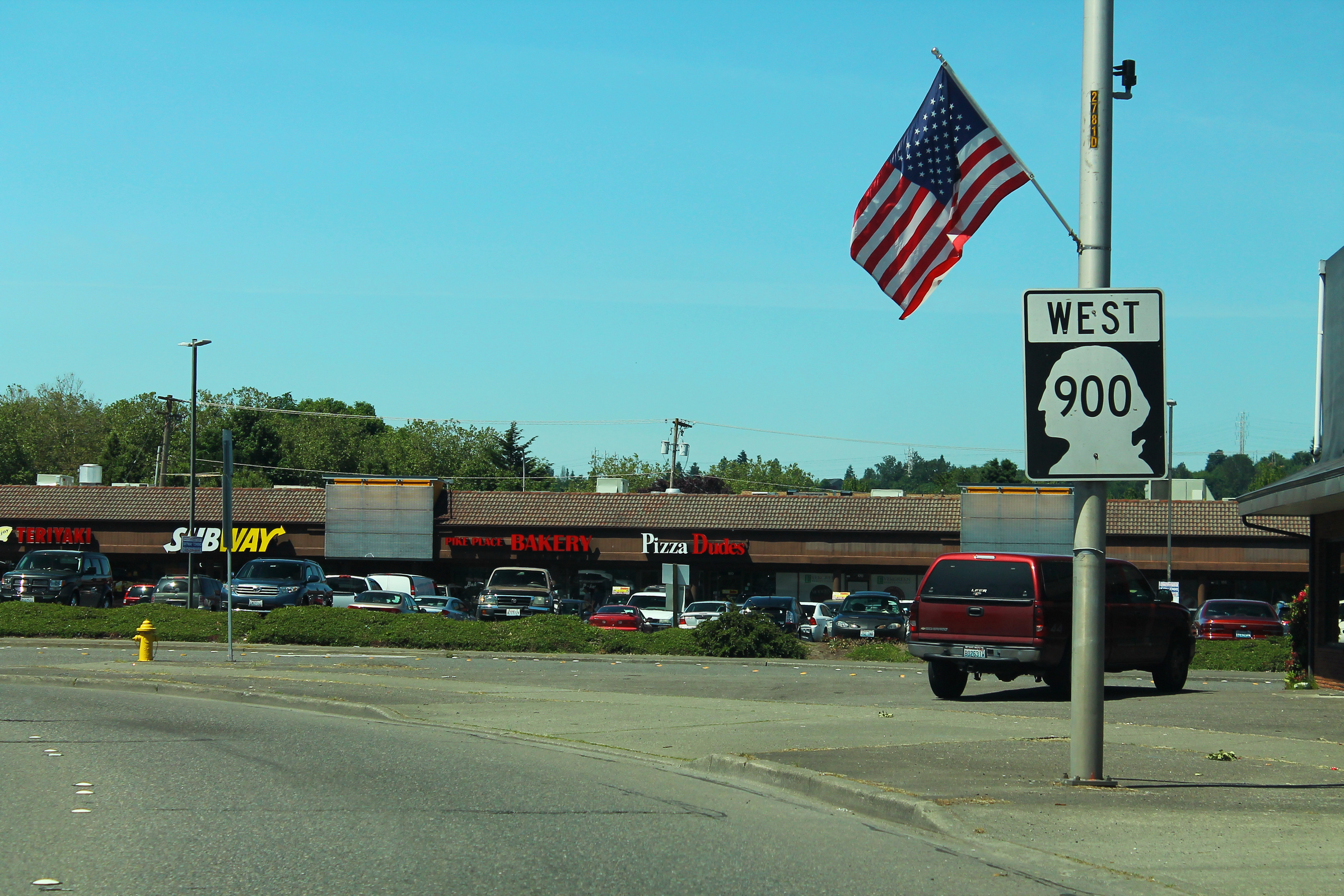
SR 900 in Renton

SR 900 begins as an extension of Martin Luther King Jr. Way South at an intersection with Boeing Access Road, east of its interchange with I-5 under an elevated section of the Central Link light rail line, near the Allentown neighborhood of northern Tukwila. The four-lane highway splits at a basketweave interchange with I-5, with the southbound lanes of SR 900 traveling over the freeway twice. The roadway continues southeast into Skyway whilst parallel to I-5 and the BNSF South Seattle railyard. SR 900 turns east and becomes Sunset Boulevard as it enters Renton, following the Black River and a BNSF branch railroad, to an intersection with SR 167 at Rainier Avenue.

The highway splits into a couplet on 2nd and 3rd streets for several blocks in downtown Renton, serving the Renton transit center, before returning to two-way traffic at a bridge over the Cedar River, downstream of the Renton branch of the King County Library System. SR 900 then continues east, around the northwest side of Liberty Park, before turning north to briefly parallel I-405 after its interchange with SR 169. The highway then joins I-405 in a short concurrency for 0.90 miles (1.45 km), traveling east through Renton's suburbs towards the East Renton Highlands. The highway transitions into a two-lane country road, entering unincorporated King County while following Tibbetts Creek northeastward between Cougar and Squak mountains, part of the Issaquah Alps highlands. SR 900 enters Issaquah as the four-lane 17th Avenue, passing the Issaquah park and ride, before ending at a partial cloverleaf interchange with I-90 south of Lake Sammamish State Park.

Every year, the Washington State Department of Transportation (WSDOT) conducts a series of surveys on its highways in the state to measure traffic volume. This is expressed in terms of annual average daily traffic (AADT), which is a measure of traffic volume for any average day of the year. In 2014, WSDOT calculated that the busiest section of SR 900 was at its bridge over the Cedar River in downtown Renton, carrying 48,000 vehicles, while the least busiest section was on the eastbound lanes of the one-way pair in Renton, carrying 6,300 vehicles.

== History ==
The road now designated SR 900 was originally added to the state highway system in 1909, as an extension of the Snoqualmie Pass Road (State Road 7) which was completed for through traffic across the pass in 1915. At the time the highway was the main thoroughfare between Seattle and Spokane, with a route then around the south end of Lake Washington. In 1913 the highway was renamed the Sunset Highway, which is still an informal moniker today.

The road became State Road 2 in 1923 and Primary State Highway 2 in 1937. In 1926 the highway was co-designated to be part of US 10. The legislature in 1931 also designated the route as part of the Washington Loop Highway.

The opening of the Lake Washington Floating Bridge across Lake Washington in 1940 moved US 10/PSH 2 to the direct route, and the old alignment became Alternate US 10 and PSH 2 RE (for Renton). In 1955, Alternate US 10 was dropped, and it became SR 900 in 1964.

After April 1, 1992, the stretch of SR 900 between I-90 exit 3 at Rainier Avenue and along Martin Luther King Jr. Way to the Boeing Access Road was dropped from the officially designated highway. The west end of SR 900 is now milepost 5.93 due to this truncation; the east end is milepost 21.64.

WSDOT plans to construct a roundabout on SR 900 at South 129th Street in Skyway to address a high number of collisions; from 2012 to 2022, 931 collisions had been recorded on the highway between I-5 and Renton, with four fatalities.

== Major intersections ==
The entire highway is in King County.

Location	mi	km	Destinations	Notes
Tukwila	0.00	0.00	To I-5 north / Boeing Access Road – Seattle	Interchange; eastbound entrance and westbound exit; continues north as Martin Luther King Jr. Way South.
Tukwila	0.55	0.89	I-5 south – Portland	Interchange
Renton	3.97	6.39	SR 167 south to I-405	
Renton	4.56	7.34	SR 515 south (Main Street)	
Renton	5.10	8.21	SR 169 south / I-405 to I-5 – Maple Valley, Enumclaw	Interchange
Renton	5.62	9.04	I-405 south – Tacoma	Interchange; west end of I-405 concurrency; westbound exit and eastbound entrance.
Renton	6.52	10.49	I-405 north – Everett	Interchange; east end of I-405 concurrency
Issaquah	16.20	26.07	I-90 – Seattle, Spokane	Interchange; continues as 17th Avenue Northwest
1.000 mi = 1.609 km; 1.000 km = 0.621 mi: Concurrency terminus
