= Covington, Washington =

City in Washington, United States

- City
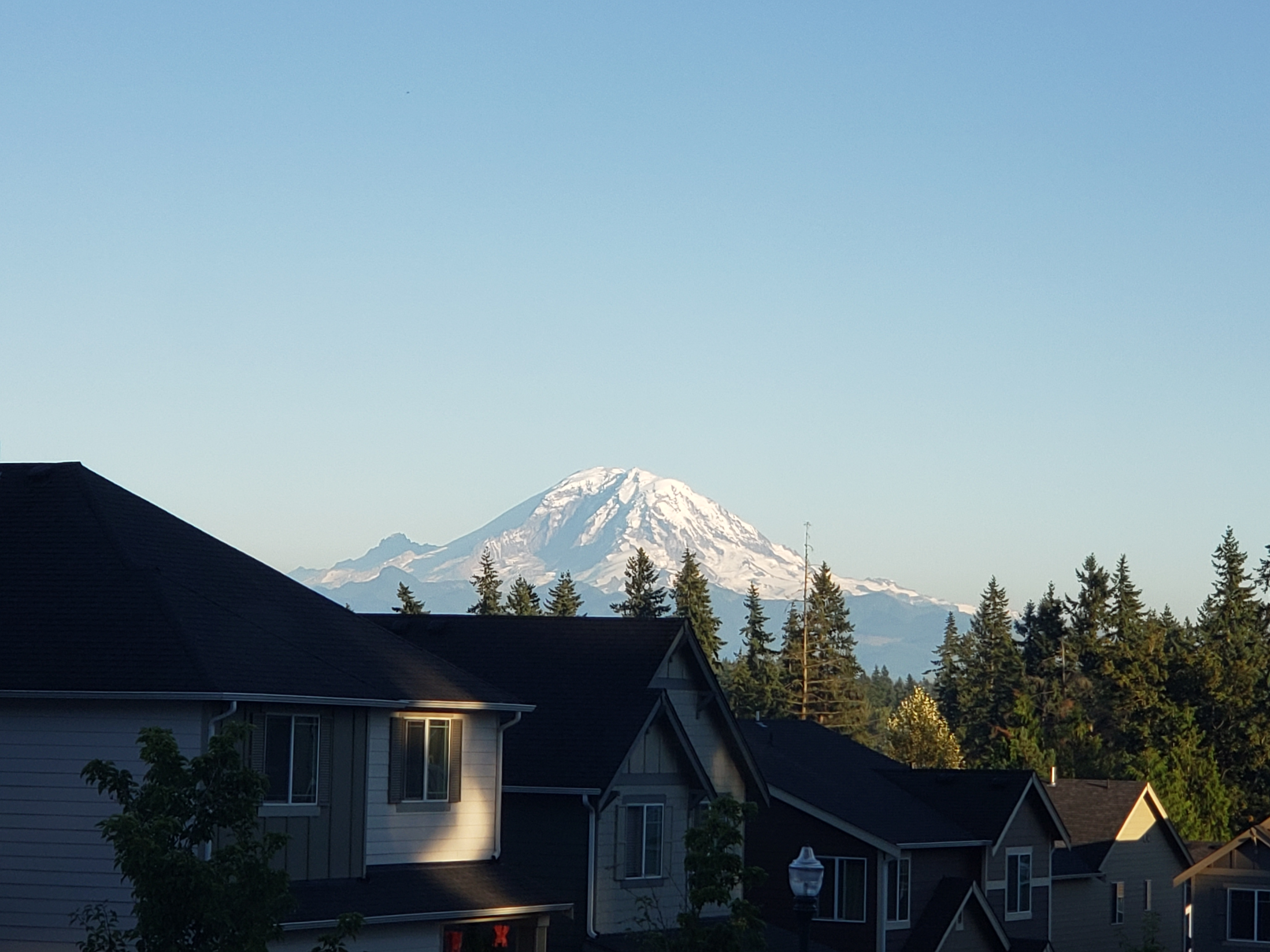
- Mount Rainier as seen from a Covington neighborhood
- Motto: "Unmatched Quality of Life"
- Location of Covington, Washington
- Coordinates: 47.364793°N 122.104561°W
- Country: United States
- State: Washington
- County: King
- Founded: 1900
- Incorporated: August 31, 1997

Government
  - Type: Council–manager
  - Mayor: Sean Smith

Area
  - Total: 6.042 sq mi (15.649 km^{2})
  - Land: 5.931 sq mi (15.360 km^{2})
  - Water: 0.111 sq mi (0.287 km^{2}) 1.84%
- Elevation: 384 ft (117 m)

Population (2020)
  - Total: 20,777
  - Estimate (2024): 21,567
  - Density: 3,636.3/sq mi (1,403.99/km^{2})
- Time zone: UTC–8 (Pacific (PST))
  - Summer (DST): UTC–7 (PDT)
- ZIP Code: 98042
- Area code: 253
- FIPS code: 53-15290
- GNIS feature ID: 2410253
- Website: covingtonwa.gov

Covington is a city in King County, Washington, United States. The population was 20,777 at the 2020 census, and was estimated to be 21,567 in 2024.

== History ==
Covington was founded in 1900 at a Northern Pacific Railway stop and grew into a suburban bedroom community in the late 20th century. It was incorporated as a city on August 31, 1997.

The area presently known as Covington was originally known as Jenkins Prairie. Between 1899 and 1900, the Northern Pacific Railway built the Palmer Cutoff between Auburn and Palmer to improve the company's primary east–west rail route across Stampede Pass. Richard Covington, a surveyor for the Northern Pacific, worked out of Fort Vancouver establishing the line from St. Paul, Minnesota, to Auburn.

In 1900, during the building of the Palmer Cutoff, the Northern Pacific built several facilities in Covington. These included a 2,850-foot passing track, a 700-foot loading track, a second-class section house, a 24-man bunkhouse, a box tank, and a standpipe for watering steam locomotives. By 1908, the settlement was also home to the Covington Lumber Company, which had set up a mill capable of cutting 85,000 board feet of timber a day. NP's operations at Covington continued until the Great Depression; the facilities were then removed in 1941.

Dairies replaced lumber as the predominant industry in the Covington area by the 1920s; several irrigation canals were dug from local creeks to provide water during dry periods. A school district for Covington was established in 1937. Over the years, the area grew as an unincorporated area outside of Kent and was designated as a suburban development hub by the county government. A local citizens' group formed to incorporate Covington as its own city to control development planning; an attempt to also include Lake Meridian in the proposed city failed and it was instead annexed by Kent. The vote to incorporate Covington as a city passed on November 6, 1996, the same day a similar measure created neighboring Maple Valley. Covington was officially incorporated as a city on August 31, 1997, and had approximately 12,200 residents at the time.

== Geography ==
Covington is located in southern King County. The city is surrounded by Kent to the west, Auburn to the southwest, and Maple Valley to the east. Pipe Lake is located in Covington and adjacent Maple Valley.

According to the United States Census Bureau, the city has a total area of 6.042 square miles (15.65 km^{2}), of which, 5.931 square miles (15.36 km^{2}) is land and 0.111 square miles (0.29 km^{2}) (1.84%) is water.

== Economy ==
With its rapid population growth since the city's incorporation, much of the city's income depends on the retail industry. The city's retail core, which largely developed in the 2000s, is located along the State Route 516 corridor.

Covington is also a regional medical hub for southeast King County with MultiCare Health Systems and Valley Medical Center each having facilities in the city. MultiCare opened a four-story hospital serving the city in 2018 with 58 beds, emergency rooms, and a family birth center.

== Government ==
Presidential Elections Results
Year	Republican	Democratic	Third Parties
2020	40.31% 4,524	55.98% 6,283	3.71% 416

The city is governed by a council-manager government consisting of a seven-person city council. Members are elected at-large, (that is, each is elected by all citizens of the city, not by districts).

Fire protection is provided by Puget Sound Regional Fire Authority.

Public schools in the city are part of the Kent School District.

== Demographics ==
Historical population
Census	Pop.	Note	%±
2000	13,783		—
2010	17,575		27.5%
2020	20,777		18.2%
2024 (est.)	21,567		3.8%
U.S. Decennial Census; 2020 Census

Prior to the 2000 census, part of Covington was counted as part of Covington-Sawyer-Wilderness CDP.

Based on per capita income, one of the more reliable measures of affluence, Covington ranks 34th of 522 areas in the state of Washington to be ranked.

The city currently ranks #54 out of 281 municipalities in the State for population.

According to realtor website Zillow, the average price of a home as of May 31, 2025, in Covington is $692,755.

The top five reported ancestries (people were allowed to report up to two ancestries, thus the figures will generally add to more than 100%) were English (76.1%), Spanish (5.8%), Indo-European (8.5%), Asian and Pacific Islander (7.4%), and Other (2.4%).

The median age in the city was 37.4 years.

=== Racial and ethnic composition ===
Covington, Washington – racial and ethnic composition Note: the US Census treats Hispanic/Latino as an ethnic category. This table excludes Latinos from the racial categories and assigns them to a separate category. Hispanics/Latinos may be of any race.
Race / ethnicity (NH = non-Hispanic)	Pop. 1990	Pop. 2000	Pop. 2010	Pop. 2020	% 1990	% 2000	% 2010	% 2020
White alone (NH)	22,686	11,841	12,680	12,772	93.28%	85.91%	72.15%	61.47%
Black or African American alone (NH)	19	325	714	1,069	0.08%	2.36%	4.06%	5.15%
Native American or Alaska Native alone (NH)	254	129	118	98	1.04%	0.94%	0.67%	0.47%
Asian alone (NH)	450	415	1,469	2,417	1.85%	3.01%	8.36%	11.63%
Pacific Islander alone (NH)	—	31	98	155	—	0.22%	0.56%	0.75%
Other race alone (NH)	16	42	35	130	0.07%	0.30%	0.20%	0.63%
Mixed race or multiracial (NH)	—	383	827	1,722	—	2.78%	4.71%	8.29%
Hispanic or Latino (any race)	596	617	1,634	2,414	2.45%	4.48%	9.30%	11.62%
Total	24,321	13,783	17,575	20,777	100.00%	100.00%	100.00%	100.00%

=== 2020 census ===
As of the 2020 census, there were 20,777 people, 7,005 households, and 5,416 families residing in the city. The population density was 3,502.53 inhabitants per square mile (1,352.3/km^{2}). There were 7,149 housing units at an average density of 1,205.16 per square mile (465.3/km^{2}).

The median age was 36.5 years. 24.9% of residents were under the age of 18 and 11.5% of residents were 65 years of age or older. For every 100 females there were 99.2 males, and for every 100 females age 18 and over there were 97.9 males age 18 and over.

100.0% of residents lived in urban areas, while 0.0% lived in rural areas.

There were 7,005 households in Covington, of which 39.1% had children under the age of 18 living in them. Of all households, 60.0% were married-couple households, 13.5% were households with a male householder and no spouse or partner present, and 19.3% were households with a female householder and no spouse or partner present. About 16.6% of all households were made up of individuals and 7.0% had someone living alone who was 65 years of age or older.

Of those housing units, 2.0% were vacant. The homeowner vacancy rate was 0.3% and the rental vacancy rate was 4.0%.

Racial composition as of the 2020 census
Race	Number	Percent
White	13,264	63.8%
Black or African American	1,109	5.3%
American Indian and Alaska Native	145	0.7%
Asian	2,453	11.8%
Native Hawaiian and Other Pacific Islander	169	0.8%
Some other race	1,078	5.2%
Two or more races	2,559	12.3%
Hispanic or Latino (of any race)	2,414	11.6%

=== American Community Survey ===
As of the 2023 American Community Survey, there are 7,324 estimated households in Covington with an average of 2.86 persons per household. The city has a median household income of $126,730. Approximately 4.7% of the city's population lives at or below the poverty line. Covington has an estimated 70.4% employment rate, with 35.9% of the population holding a bachelor's degree or higher and 94.1% holding a high school diploma.

=== 2010 census ===
As of the 2010 census, there were 17,575 people, 5,817 households, and 4,649 families residing in the city. The population density was 2,998.1 inhabitants per square mile (1,157.6/km^{2}). There were 6,081 housing units at an average density of 1,037.7 per square mile (400.7/km^{2}). The racial makeup of the city was 76.12% White, 4.22% African American, 0.83% Native American, 8.48% Asian, 0.57% Pacific Islander, 3.95% from some other races and 5.84% from two or more races. Hispanic or Latino people of any race were 9.30% of the population.

There were 5,817 households, of which 46.5% had children under the age of 18 living with them, 63.2% were married couples living together, 11.0% had a female householder with no husband present, 5.7% had a male householder with no wife present, and 20.1% were non-families. 14.4% of all households were made up of individuals, and 4.1% had someone living alone who was 65 years of age or older. The average household size was 3.02 and the average family size was 3.31.

The median age in the city was 34.7 years. 28.6% of residents were under the age of 18; 8.8% were between the ages of 18 and 24; 28.9% were from 25 to 44; 27.4% were from 45 to 64; and 6.3% were 65 years of age or older. The gender makeup of the city was 50.0% male and 50.0% female.

=== 2000 census ===
As of the 2000 census, there were 13,783 people, 4,398 households, and 3,689 families residing in the city. The population density was 2,389.8 inhabitants per square mile (922.7/km^{2}). There were 4,473 housing units at an average density of 775.5 per square mile (299.4/km^{2}). The racial makeup of the city was 87.88% White, 2.44% African American, 1.02% Native American, 3.12% Asian, 0.22% Pacific Islander, 1.80% from some other races and 3.53% from two or more races. Hispanic or Latino people of any race were 4.48% of the population.

There were 4,398 households, 52.2% of which had children under the age of 18 living with them, 70.1% were married couples living together, 9.7% had a female householder with no husband present, and 16.1% were non-families. 11.4% of all households were made up of individuals, and 1.7% had someone living alone who was 65 years of age or older. The average household size was 3.13 and the average family size was 3.37.

In the city the population was spread out, with 33.8% under the age of 18, 7.0% from 18 to 24, 36.2% from 25 to 44, 19.3% from 45 to 64, and 3.7% who were 65 years of age or older. The median age was 32 years. For every 100 females, there were 103.3 males. For every 100 females age 18 and over, there were 100.2 males.

The median income for a household in the city was $63,711, and the median income for a family was $65,173. Males had a median income of $48,134 versus $34,576 for females. The per capita income for the city was $22,230. About 2.1% of families and 3.6% of the population were below the poverty line, including 3.1% of those under age 18 and 5.9% of those age 65 or over.

== Parks and recreation ==
The City of Covington maintains a year-round aquatic center. The city also offers basketball, baseball, football and soccer youth leagues from pre-k through 8th grade, recreation classes, and special events. The city is also home to eight city-run parks, and one municipally maintained trail.

== Infrastructure ==
=== Transportation ===
The city's principal arterial is State Route 516, known locally as Southeast 272nd Street or Kent-Kangley Road, which runs through the city on its west–east route from Des Moines to Maple Valley. The only freeway that passes through the city is State Route 18, which passes through the city on a northeast–southwest route. State Route 18, which connects Interstate 90 near Snoqualmie and Interstate 5 in Federal Way, is a major route used by vehicles traveling between south King County and Eastern Washington.

Public transportation is provided by King County Metro.

=== Emergency services ===
Covington contracts with the King County Sheriff's Office for police services. Deputies assigned to Covington wear Covington uniforms and drive patrol cars marked with the city logo. There are currently 12 patrol officers, one chief, one sergeant, one school resource officer, one traffic officer, and one detective assigned full-time to the city.

Covington is part of the Puget Sound Regional Fire Authority (RFA), along with the cities of Kent, and SeaTac and portions of unincorporated King County. The city's first fire station opened in 2009; it is a 17,385-square foot building located on Southeast 256th Street. The RFA's board meetings are conducted in the Covington fire station.

== Notable people ==
- Jeff Dye, stand-up comedian attended Kentwood High School in Covington
- Debra Entenman, member of the Washington House of Representatives
- Mark Hargrove, former member of Washington House of Representatives.
- Reese McGuire, professional baseball player, first round draft pick for the Pittsburgh Pirates
- Lindsey Moore, professional basketball player
- Bob Smith, comic book artist for DC and Archie Comics
- Pat Sullivan, majority leader of the Washington House of Representatives and former mayor of Covington
- Courtney Thompson, volleyball player
