= Kingsgate, Kirkland, Washington =

Kingsgate, Washington
- Neighborhood
- Location of Kingsgate, Washington
- Coordinates: 47°43′35″N 122°10′27″W
- Country: United States
- State: Washington
- County: King
- City: Kirkland

Area
  - Total: 2.3 sq mi (6.0 km^{2})
  - Land: 2.3 sq mi (6.0 km^{2})
  - Water: 0 sq mi (0.0 km^{2})
- Elevation: 325 ft (99 m)

Population (2010)
  - Total: 13,065
  - Density: 5,256/sq mi (2,029.2/km^{2})
- Time zone: UTC-8 (Pacific (PST))
  - Summer (DST): UTC-7 (PDT)
- ZIP code: 98034
- Area code: 425
- FIPS code: 53-35835
- GNIS feature ID: 1509742

Kingsgate is a neighborhood of Kirkland, Washington, United States. It was annexed by Kirkland on June 1, 2011. Prior to the annexation, Kingsgate was a census-designated place (CDP).

Based on 2010 US Census data, Kingsgate ranks 70th of 522 evaluated areas in the state of Washington by per capita income.

== Geography ==
Kingsgate is located at 47°43′35″N 122°10′27″W (47.726320, -122.174184).

According to the United States Census Bureau, the CDP had a total area of 2.3 square miles (6.0 km^{2}), all of it land.

== Demographics ==
Historical population
Census	Pop.	Note	%±
1980	12,652		—
1990	14,259		12.7%
2000	12,222		−14.3%
2010	13,065		6.9%

As of the census of 2000, there were 12,222 people, 4,314 households, and 3,157 families residing in the CDP. The population density was 5,255.7 people per square mile (2,025.3/km^{2}). There were 4,424 housing units at an average density of 1,902.4/sq mi (733.1/km^{2}). The racial makeup of the CDP was 79.95% White, 1.63% African American, 0.61% Native American, 11.63% Asian, 0.24% Pacific Islander, 1.82% from other races, and 4.12% from two or more races. Hispanic or Latino of any race were 5.65% of the population.

There were 4,314 households, out of which 37.9% had children under the age of 18 living with them, 58.0% were married couples living together, 11.4% had a female householder with no husband present, and 26.8% were non-families. 20.0% of all households were made up of individuals, and 3.8% had someone living alone who was 65 years of age or older. The average household size was 2.83 and the average family size was 3.26.

In the CDP, the population was spread out, with 27.9% under the age of 18, 7.9% from 18 to 24, 33.8% from 25 to 44, 23.7% from 45 to 64, and 6.8% who were 65 years of age or older. The median age was 34 years. For every 100 females, there were 97.6 males. For every 100 females age 18 and over, there were 93.8 males.

The median income for a household in the CDP was $65,046, and the median income for a family was $70,548. Males had a median income of $50,765 versus $33,262 for females. The per capita income for the CDP was $26,543. About 3.2% of families and 4.9% of the population were below the poverty line, including 6.9% of those under age 18 and 5.5% of those age 65 or over.
