= Washington State Route 167 =

State highway in Washington, US

State Route 167
- Valley Freeway
- SR 167 highlighted in red

Route information
- Auxiliary route of SR 410
- Maintained by WSDOT
- Length: 28.46 mi (45.80 km)
- Existed: 1964–present

Major junctions
- South end: I-5 in Tacoma
- SR 161 / SR 512 in Puyallup; SR 410 in Sumner; SR 18 in Auburn; SR 516 in Kent; I-405 in Renton
- North end: SR 900 in Renton

Location
- Country: United States
- State: Washington
- Counties: Pierce, King

Highway system
- State highways in Washington; Interstate; US; State; Scenic; Pre-1964; 1964 renumbering; Former
← SR 166	→ SR 169

State Route 167 (SR 167) is a state highway in the Seattle metropolitan area of Washington state. It is commonly known as the Valley Freeway and serves the Green River Valley from Tacoma to Renton, primarily as a four-lane freeway. The 28-mile (45 km) highway begins in Tacoma at an interchange with Interstate 5 (I-5) and travels southeast to Puyallup as an undivided road. It then turns northeast onto a freeway and passes through interchanges with SR 512 in Puyallup and SR 410 in Sumner, continuing north through Auburn and Kent. After an interchange with I-405 in Renton, it terminates at an intersection with SR 900.

== Route description ==
SR 167 begins at an interchange with I-5 in Tacoma, adjacent to the Emerald Queen Casino and near the Puyallup Indian Tribe headquarters. The interchange is fed by ramps leading to and from the Tacoma Dome area and Downtown Tacoma, with auxiliary ramps to East 28th Street and East Bay Street that connect to Portland Avenue East. SR 167 travels southeast along the south bank of the Puyallup River as a four-lane undivided highway, passing through farmland and industrial areas. It then enters the city of Puyallup and traverses an auto row at the north edge of downtown before turning north onto Meridian Avenue near the commuter rail station. SR 167 crosses the Puyallup River on a pair of bridges and turns east onto a freeway, where it begins a short concurrency with SR 161, which continues north on Meridian Avenue towards Federal Way.

The four-lane freeway travels east over Milwaukee Avenue to a trumpet interchange with SR 512, where the concurrency with SR 161 ends. SR 167 gains a set of auxiliary lanes and enters a long curve to the north along the Puyallup River in Sumner, where it meets the west end of SR 410 near the city's train station. The highway turns north and follows a section of the Union Pacific Railroad through an industrial area along the White River in northern Sumner. SR 167 continues under a bluff along the west side of the White River Valley and crosses into King County as it passes through the suburban towns of Pacific and Algona. The Interurban Trail begins to parallel the freeway in Pacific, but veers northeast in Algona to follow the Union Pacific Railroad.

SR 167 then gains a set of high-occupancy toll (HOT) lanes with variable rates of $1 to $15 for non-carpool and motorcycle traffic. The southbound HOT lane ends in Pacific, while the northbound lane begins in Auburn, forming a six-lane freeway. It then passes The Outlet Collection shopping mall, served by interchanges with 15th Street Southwest and SR 18, an east–west freeway with connections to Federal Way and Covington. SR 167 travels along Mill Creek and the Interurban Trail on the western side of downtown Auburn, passing the Emerald Downs racetrack and Auburn Municipal Airport, and traverses a rural part of the Green River Valley as it enters Kent.

The freeway crosses over the Green River into downtown Kent and intersects SR 516, which continues west to Highline College and Des Moines and east to Covington and Maple Valley. SR 167 turns northeast, crossing over the Interurban Trail and Union Pacific Railroad near the accesso ShoWare Center sports arena and the Maleng Regional Justice Center. The freeway continues through an industrial area on the outskirts of downtown Kent and crosses over the BNSF Railway's Seattle Subdivision before turning north to follow the east edge of the Green River Valley. SR 167 separates the Green River industrial area and the residential neighborhoods of Benson Hill and East Hill as it crosses into Renton near the Valley Medical Center at Carr Road. The freeway reaches a cloverleaf interchange with I-405, which includes a direct access ramp from the HOT lanes to the high-occupancy vehicle (HOV) lanes on I-405 heading north towards Bellevue. SR 167 continues onto a six-lane section of Rainier Avenue, which passes northeast through a commercial area with car dealerships and big-box retailers. The street bends northwest and crosses under a railroad viaduct before reaching SR 900 at Sunset Boulevard, where SR 167 terminates.

The entire route of SR 167 is listed as part of the National Highway System, identifying routes that are important to the national economy, defense, and mobility, and the state's Highway of Statewide Significance program, recognizing its connection to major communities. The highway is maintained by the Washington State Department of Transportation (WSDOT), who conduct an annual survey of traffic volume that is expressed in terms of annual average daily traffic (AADT), a measure of traffic volume for any average day of the year. Average daily traffic volumes on SR 167 in 2016 ranged from a minimum of 8,400 at its southern terminus in Tacoma to a maximum of 129,000 at South 277th Street in Kent. Approximately 8 percent of all traffic on the highway is freight, mainly serving industrial areas in the Green River Valley.

== History ==
Modern-day settlements in the area between Puyallup and Renton were established in the late 19th century along the Puget Sound Shore Railroad, which opened in 1885 as the first north–south railroad in the Puget Sound region. A series of wagon roads following the railroad and the White River (later replaced by the Green River) in the valley were built within a decade.

The corridor was proposed as an addition to Washington's state highway system as early as 1909 and was ultimately added in 1913 as part of the Pacific Highway, although most of this was then deleted in 1923. The only portion kept was that between Auburn and Renton, which became part of State Road 5. The rest of the route (between Auburn and Tacoma) was added back to the state highway system two years later in 1925, also as a part of State Road 5. This route was extended north along Rainier Avenue into Seattle in 1937.

When Washington's current numbering system was developed with the 1964 renumbering, State Route 167 followed what is now State Route 164 from Enumclaw to Auburn before turning north towards Renton and Seattle. What is now SR 167 between Tacoma and Auburn was numbered U.S. Route 410 (later SR 410) between Tacoma and Sumner, and State Route 163 between Sumner and Auburn. These highways were renumbered to their current designations in 1973. The highway between Renton and Seattle was removed from the state highway system in 1991, although the law did not take effect until April 1, 1992.

The Puyallup River bridge on Meridian Avenue was built in 1925 and twinned with the addition of a two-lane bridge for southbound traffic that opened in 1971. The northbound truss bridge was replaced in 2015, with the original structure moved to a nearby plot of vacant land while awaiting a sale.

The northern half of the Renton interchange with I-405 was altered in 2003 to separate weaving traffic through the use of a flyover ramp that leads into the southbound-to-southbound loop ramp. The overloaded interchange with I-405 resulted in routine backups on I-405 as far as Tukwila to the west and the Kennydale Hill to the north. A larger overhaul was proposed as part of Referendum 51, which was rejected by voters in 2002. A direct connection between the freeway's HOT lanes and the I-405 HOV lanes was constructed from 2016 to 2019, costing $197 million.

== Future ==
WSDOT has planned to convert the entire route in Pierce County to a freeway since the mid-20th century. WSDOT is performing advance design and engineering work. The proposed highway would bypass the snarled traffic at Meridian Way in Puyallup and continue across Interstate 5 to SR 509 in the city of Fife. The project would construct a new six mile (10 km) freeway north of the Puyallup River and complete the partial interchange at Meridian Way (SR 161) with a diverging diamond interchange (DDI). The new freeway would be four lanes with adequate space for future HOV lanes. The interchange with I-5 would also be a DDI, the third in the state. Another future project will later upgrade the diverging diamond interchange with Interstate 5 to a system interchange which would include direct HOV lane ramps between the two freeways. The upgraded SR 167 would save time traveling from Tacoma to Puyallup, as the original highway is just a four-lane road with at-grade intersections and a speed limit of 50 mph (80 km/h). It would also, in theory, complete the gap of a bypass to I-5 between Renton and Tacoma. SR 512 currently provides a freeway bypass of I-5 between Puyallup and Lakewood (south of Tacoma).

The first component of the Puget Sound Gateway Project, a new bridge for 70th Avenue East over I-5 in Fife (stage 1a), began construction in 2020. The bridge uses 223-foot (68 m) girders, the longest to be installed in the U.S., and includes a roundabout with SR 99. The bridge opened as Wapato Way East on June 26, 2021.

The second component (stage 1b) began construction in summer 2022. This segment of construction built the first part of the new freeway from SR 509 to I-5, as aforementioned. The new, tolled expressway was completed and open to public on September 13, 2026.

The third component (stage 2a) began construction in 2025. This stage will widen SR 167 from the interchange at SR 410 to that at SR 161 (North Meridian Avenue), where a second diverging diamond interchange along the highway will be built. This segment is projected to finish in 2027.

The fourth and final component (stage 2b) began construction in 2026. This stage paves and constructs the remaining segment of highway between SR 161 and I-5, ultimately completing the DDI. The entire completion is expected 2030.

== Exit list ==
All exits are unnumbered.

County	Location	mi	km	Destinations	Notes
Pierce	Tacoma	0.00	0.00	I-5 to SR 16 – Olympia, Portland, Seattle	Southbound exit and northbound entrance
Pierce	Puyallup	6.50	10.46	SR 161 north – Milton, Edgewood	South end of SR 161 overlap
Pierce	Puyallup	South end of freeway			
Pierce	Puyallup	7.23	11.64	SR 161 south / SR 512 west – Olympia, Eatonville	North end of SR 161 overlap
Pierce	Sumner	8.30	13.36	SR 410 east – Sumner, Yakima	
Pierce	Sumner	10.88	17.51	24th Street East, West Valley Highway	
Pierce	Pacific	11.93	19.20	8th Street – Pacific, Milton	
King	Pacific	13.52	21.76	Ellingson Road – Algona, Pacific	
King	Auburn	15.09	24.29	To SR 18 west / 15th Street Southwest	
King	Auburn	15.61	25.12	SR 18 to I-5 – Auburn, Federal Way	No access from northbound SR 167 to westbound SR 18
King	Auburn	17.05	27.44	15th Street Northwest – Auburn	
King	Kent	19.21	30.92	South 277th Street	
King	Kent	20.90	33.64	SR 516 (Willis Street) – Des Moines	
King	Kent	22.61	36.39	84th Avenue South, North Central Avenue	
King	Kent	23.68	38.11	South 212th Street	
King	Renton	25.70	41.36	South 180th Street, Southwest 41st Street, Southwest 43rd Street, East Valley Road	
King	Renton	27.56	44.35	I-405 to I-5 – Bellevue, Everett, Seattle	
King	Renton	North end of freeway			
King	Renton	28.46	45.80	SR 900 (Sunset Boulevard / South 3rd Street)	Northern terminus
1.000 mi = 1.609 km; 1.000 km = 0.621 mi: Concurrency terminus; Incomplete access
