= List of crossings of the Cedar River (Washington) =

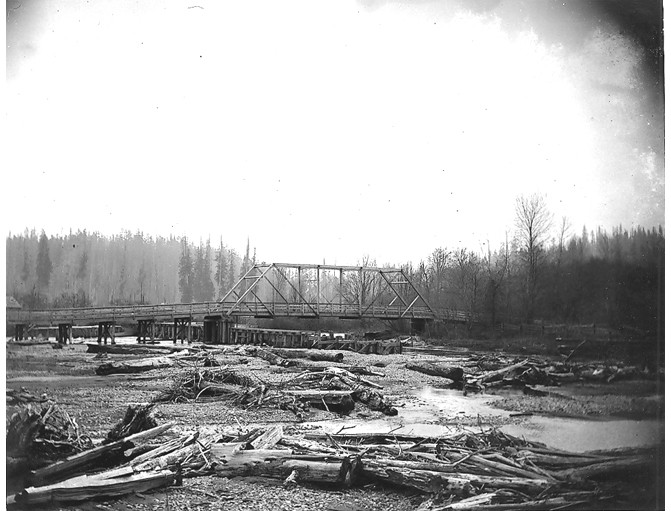
Bridge over Cedar River, 1895

This is a list of bridges and other crossings of the Cedar River from Lake Washington upstream to Chester Morse Lake in the foothills of the Cascade Mountains.

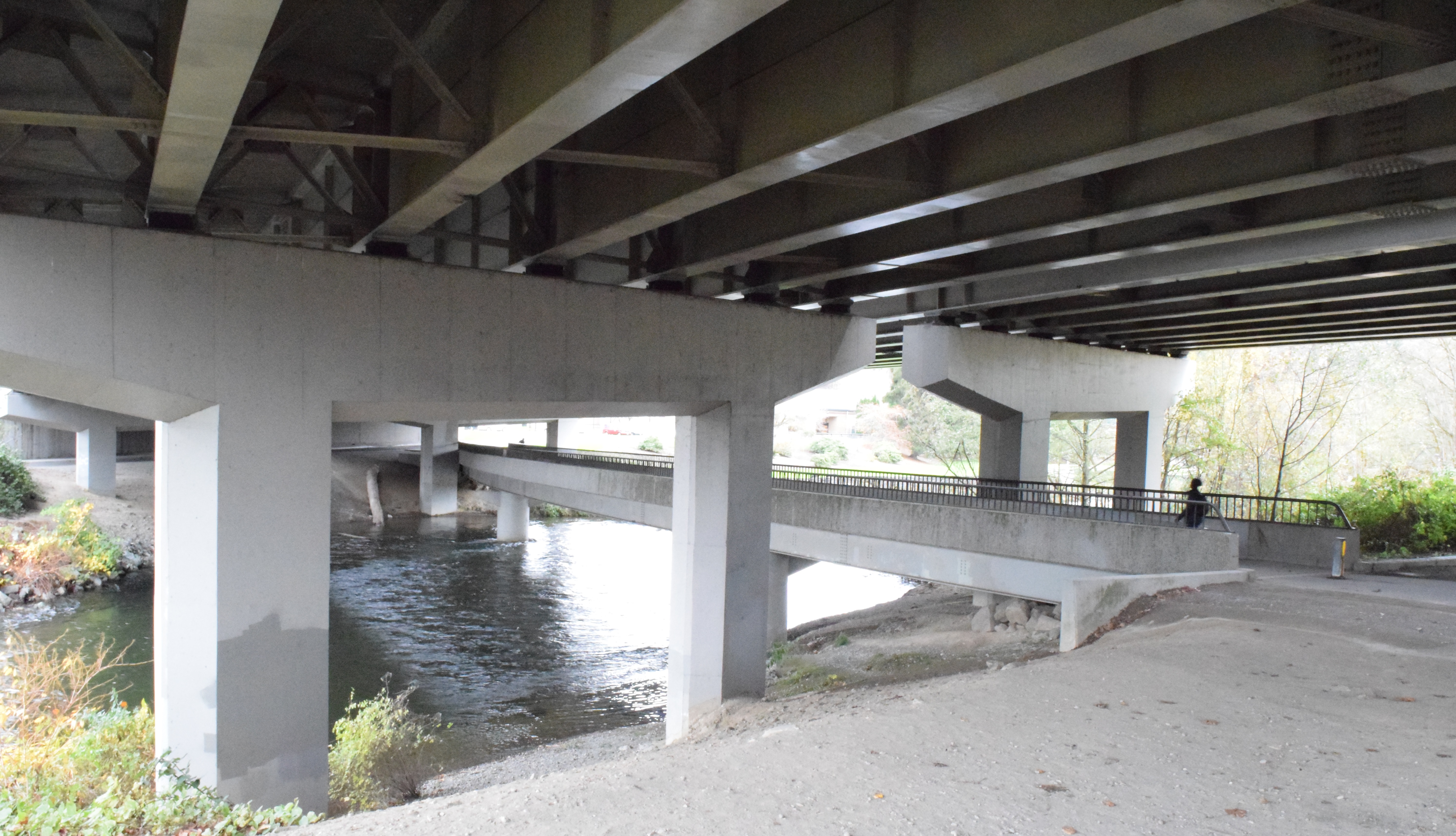
Interstate 405 bridges and a pedestrian bridge at Cedar River (Washington) in city of Renton, Washington

== Crossings ==
=== City of Renton ===
Crossings in city limits of Renton, Washington

- River mile (RM) 0 - Boeing North Bridge: Boeing Renton Factory to Renton Municipal Airport taxiway (Note: 245 ft long; Replaced in 2017 for seismic engineering considerations: new structure is "three-span, steel-plate-girder bridge contain[ing] full-depth precast deck panels with concentric transverse pre-tensioning and longitudinal post-tensioning")
- RM 0.75 - Boeing South Bridge, Boeing Renton Factory
- Logan Ave RM 1.1
- Williams Ave
- Wells Ave
- Bronson Way RM 1.5
- Renton Public Library
- Cedar River Trail pedestrian bridge at Liberty Park
- Houser Way
- BNSF Railroad (Note: 2008 - $2,200,000)
- I-405 (southbound) RM 1.6
- Cedar River Trail trail access pedestrian bridge (under I-405) at Cedar River Park
- I-405 (northbound) RM 1.6
- BNSF - Cedar River Bridge BH 53074 47.48091°N 122.20029°W
- Wooden bridge RM 2.9 (no name in KC doc) prob SE 5th at Cedar River Natural Zone 47.476677°N 122.180039°W
- Cedar River Trail Bridge #1 BH 53075 47.47524°N 122.17707°W
- Cedar River Trail Bridge #2 BH 53697 47.46963°N 122.15912°W
- Milwaukee Road Railroad - Cedar River Bridge #2 (SE 252nd Place) BH 53695 47.38497°N 121.95654°W
- Cedar River Trail
- RM 4.2 SR 169 aka Maple Valley Highway 47.469447°N 122.159439°W
- Maplewood Golf Course golf cart bridge

=== King County ===
Crossings in King County, Washington outside Renton

- RM 5.0 Elliot (Lower Jones Road [154th Place SE]) Bridge
- RM 9.2 Jones Road Bridge
- RM 11.4 Cedar Grove Road Bridge
- Cedar River Trail Bridge #3 BH 53698 47.41858°N 122.04612°W
- RM 13.8-14.7 SR 18 47.4067°N 122.0416°W and SR 169 47.4060°N 122.0393°W
- Cedar River Trail Bridge #4 BH 53699 47.40559°N 122.03811°W
- RM 16 Cedar River Trail Bridge #5 BH 53700 47.39369°N 122.03094°W
- RM 17 Cedar River Trail Bridge #6 BH 53701 47.38891°N 122.01828°W
- RM 19.6 Cedar River Trail Bridge #7 BH 53696 47.38438°N 121.99176°W
- Landsburg Dam (RM 21.7) 47.376°N 121.962°W
- RM 29.3 Barneston Bridge 47°23′15″N 121°51′40″W
- Milwaukee Road Railroad - Cedar River Bridge #1 (Milwaukee Road RR off Cedar Falls Road - fmr Cedar Falls Depot) BH 53694 47.41430°N 121.79543°W
- Masonry Dam at Chester Morse Lake 47°24′44″N 121°45′11″W
