= Rattlesnake Lake =

Lake in King County, Washington, United States

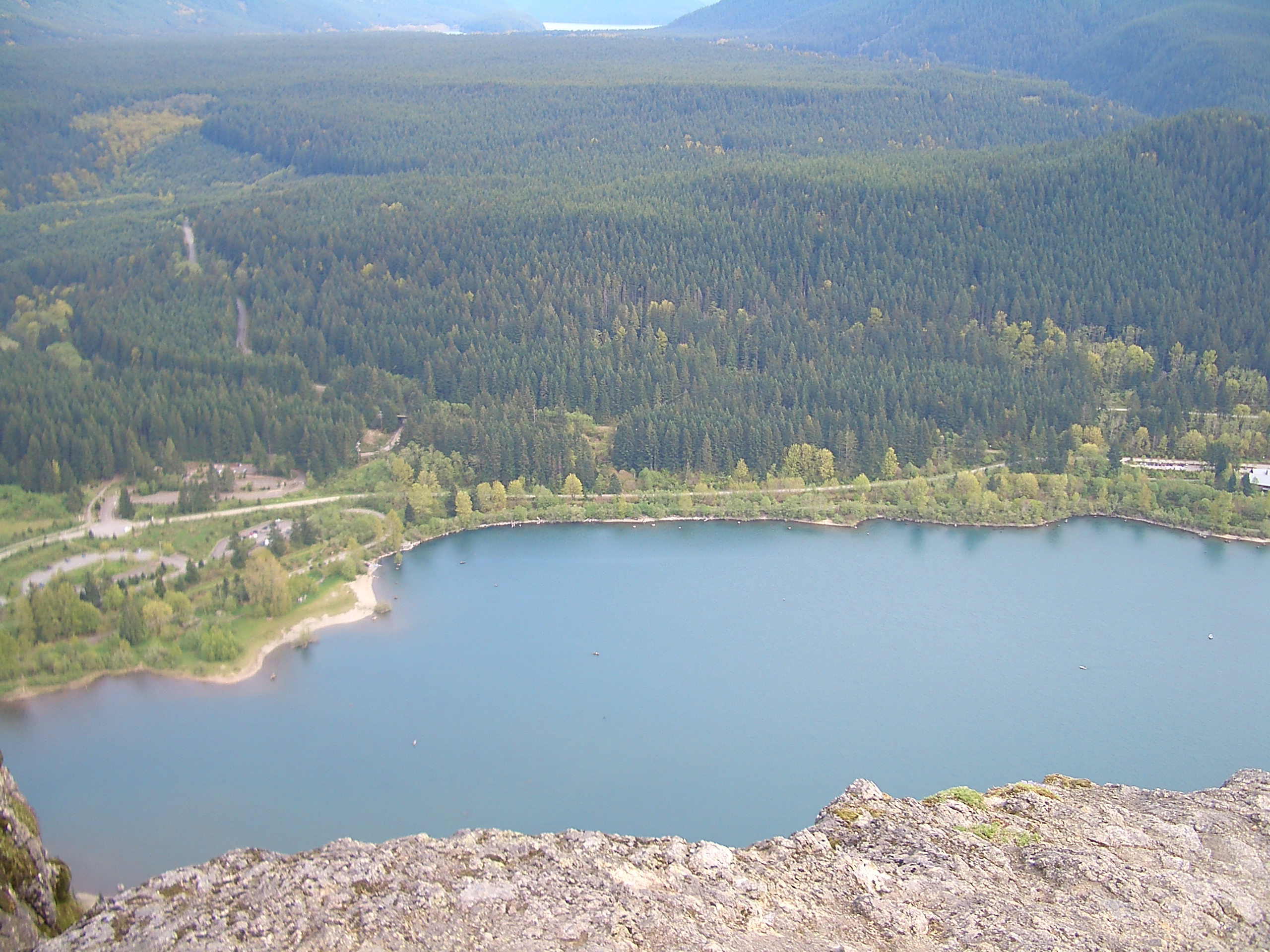
- View from Rattlesnake Ridge's Lower Ledge. Chester Morse Lake is in the far background

- Location within Washington (state) Location within the United States
- Location: King County, Washington
- Coordinates: 47°25′48″N 121°46′30″W
- Basin countries: United States
- Surface area: 107.6 acres (43.5 ha)
- Average depth: 20 ft (6 m)
- Max. depth: 40 ft (12 m)
- Surface elevation: 911 ft (278 m)
- Islands: 0
- Settlements: 1

Rattlesnake Lake is a lake in the northwest United States, located in Rattlesnake Mountain Scenic Area in King County, Washington, approximately thirty miles (50 km) east of Seattle, south of Interstate 90.

== History ==
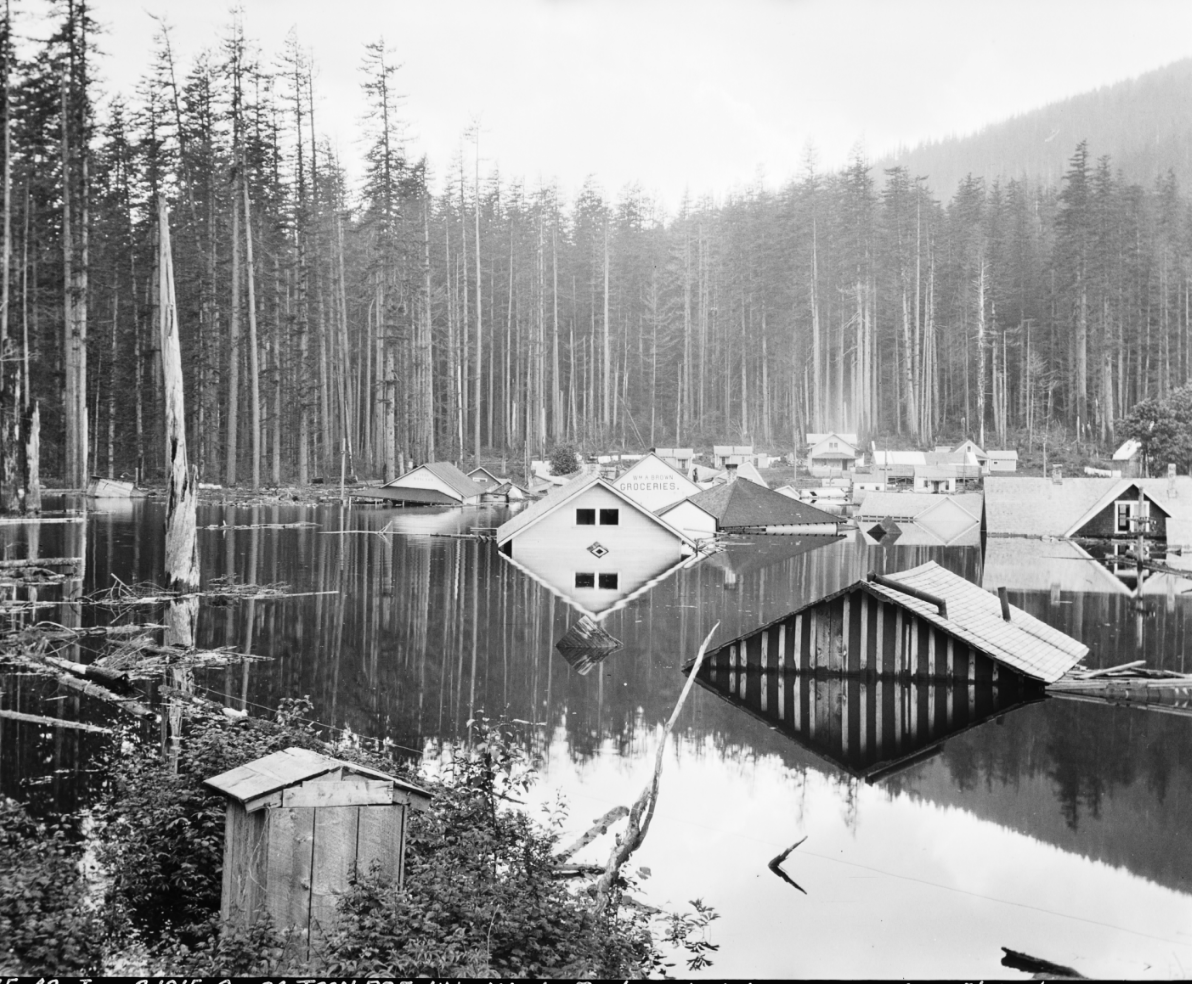
The flood, rising, 1915

The town of Moncton existed in 1906–1915 around the northern edge of Rattlesnake Lake. In the spring of 1915, it was destroyed by flooding caused by seepage of water from the newly created Chester Morse Lake into Rattlesnake Lake, and later condemned. Hardly any traces remain.

== Management ==
Rattlesnake Lake is part of the Rattlesnake Lake Recreation Area, which is owned and managed by Seattle Public Utilities as a non-development buffer to the protected municipal watershed lands. The watershed supplies 65% of the Seattle region’s unfiltered drinking water to nearly 800,000 people. However, Rattlesnake Lake itself is not used for drinking water and is spring-fed by the nearby Cedar River.

== Attractions ==
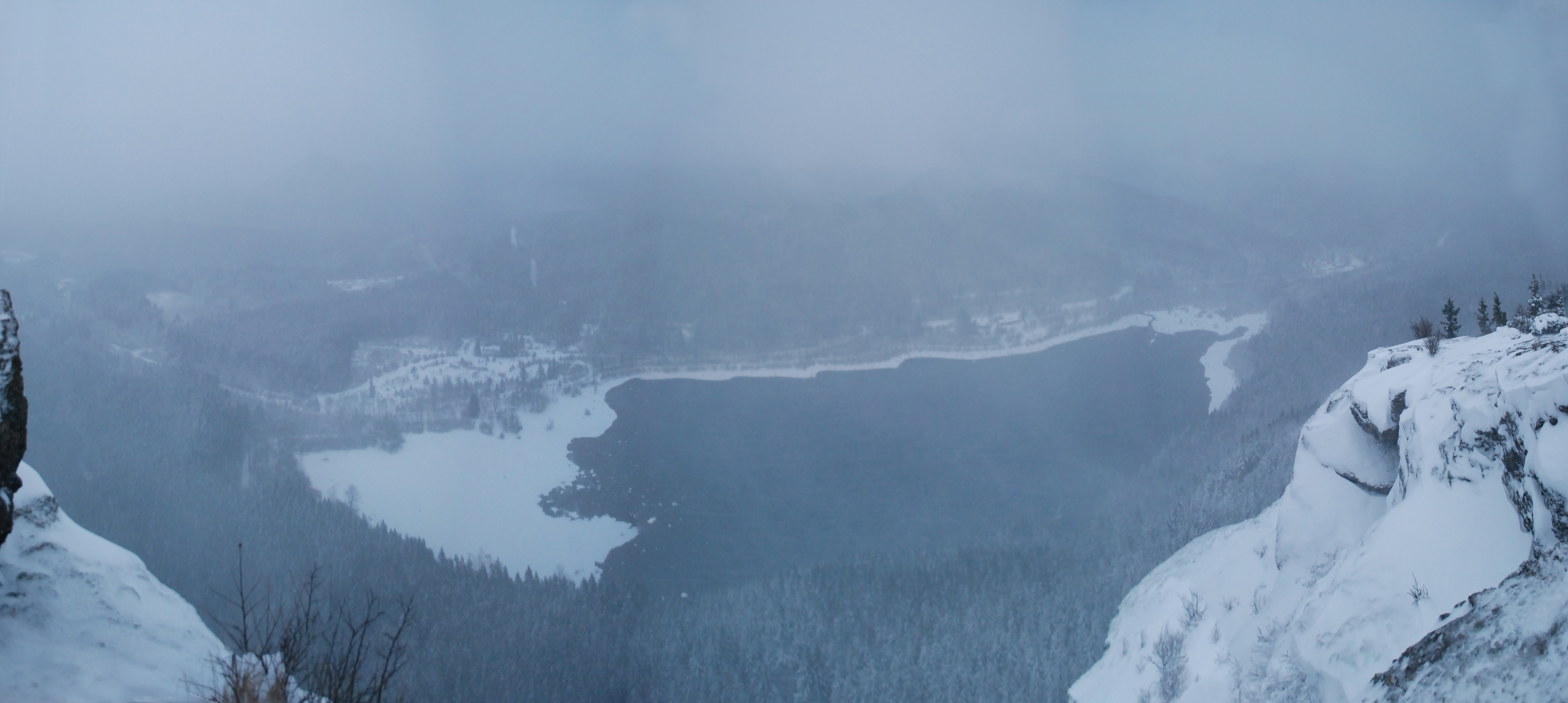
Winter View of Rattlesnake Lake from Rattlesnake Ledge

Rattlesnake Lake attracts many people during the summer. The Rattlesnake Ledge Hiking Trail ascends 1,160 feet (350 m) over two miles (3 km) of well maintained switchbacks from the north shore of the lake to the scenic Rattlesnake Ledge viewpoint that overlooks the lake.

Fishing is also popular.

The lake has many tree stumps which are exposed when the water level is low enough. The exposed stumps are often used by birds as nesting sites.

The spacious, grassy shores around the lake are used for many outdoor activities, including slacklining and picnicking.

The park serves as trailheads for both the Snoqualmie Valley Trail and the Palouse to Cascades State Park Trail.
