= Cedar River (Washington) =

River in Washington, United States

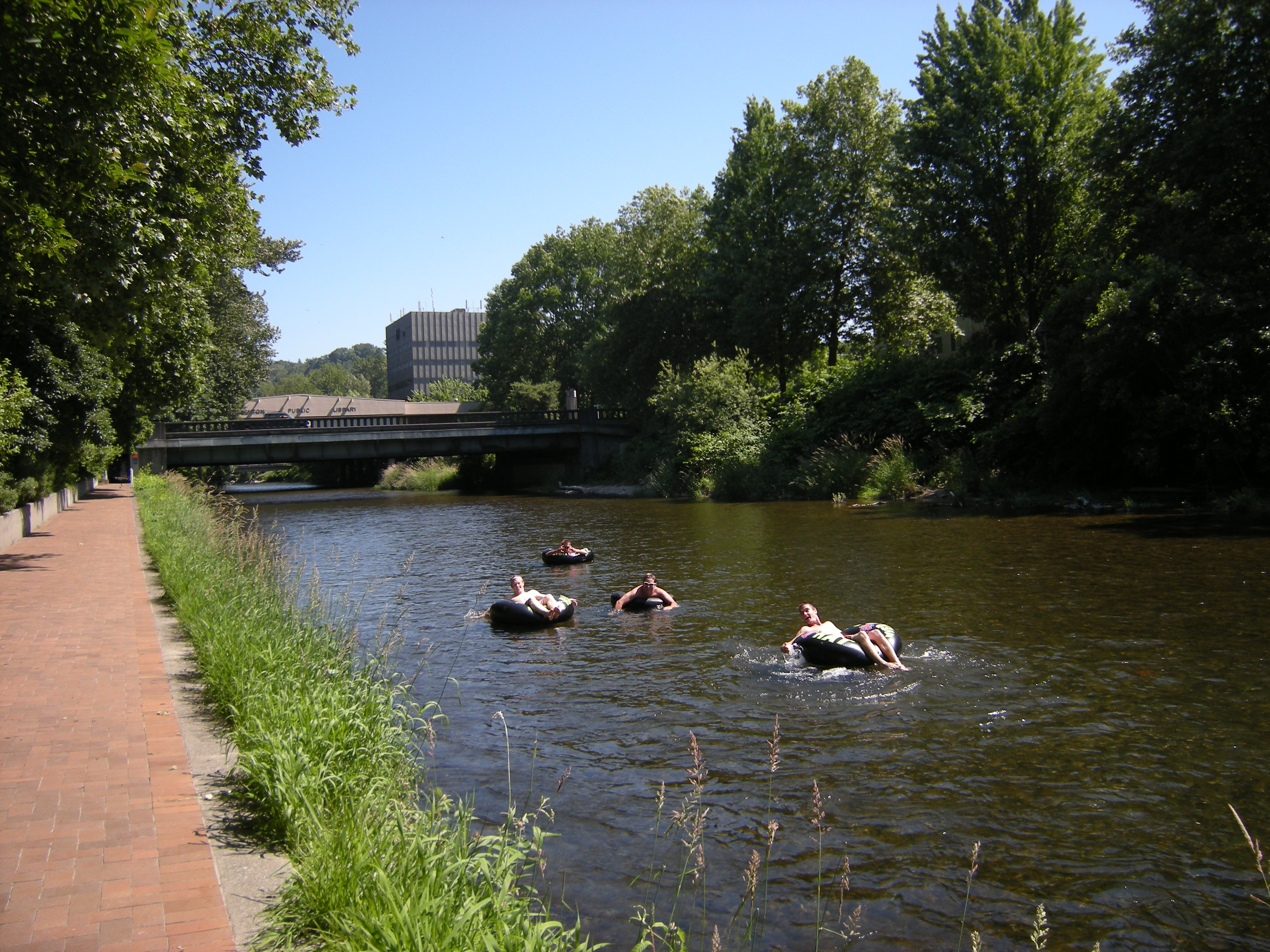
- Cedar River in Downtown Renton in 2009

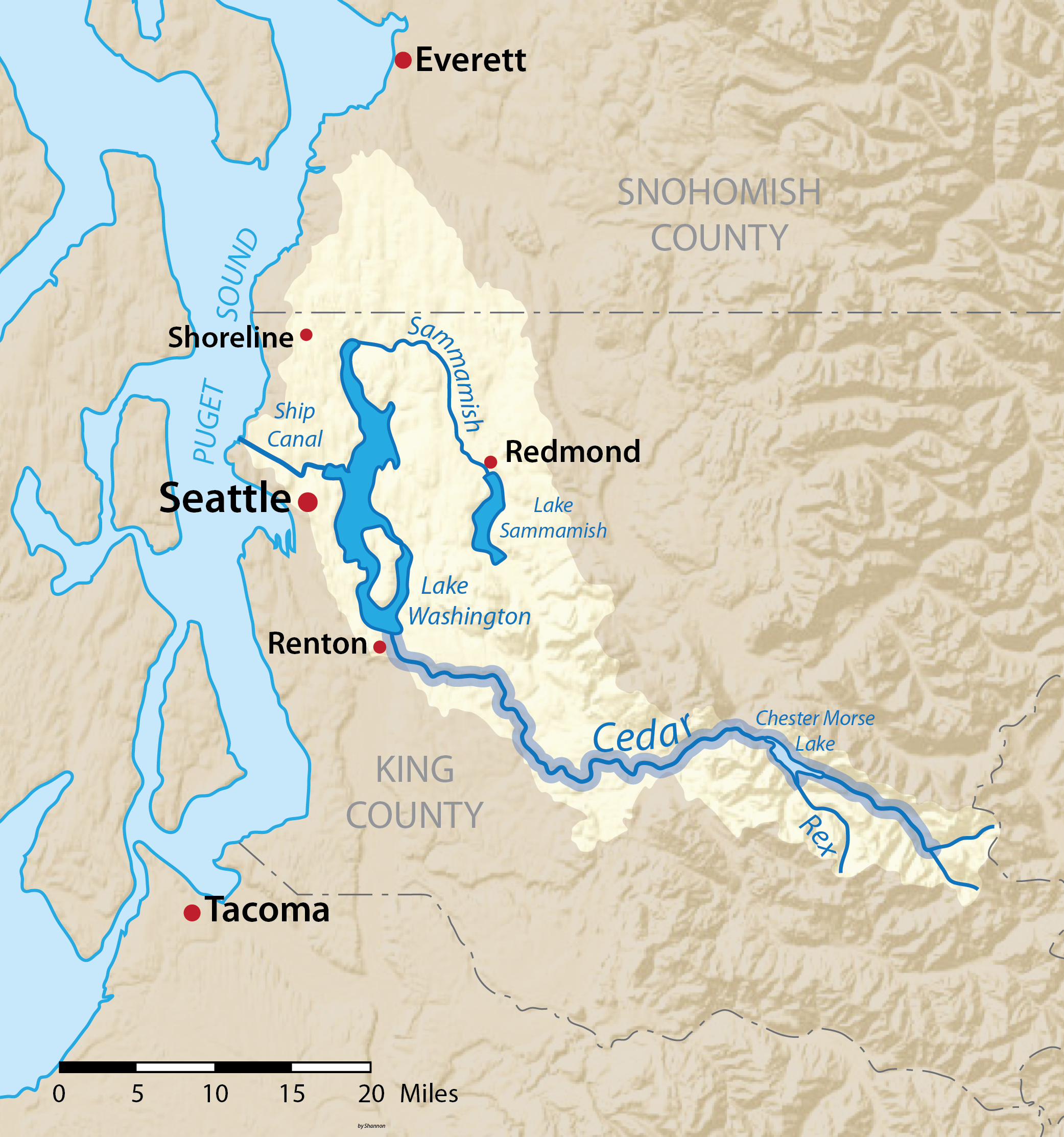
- Map of the Lake Washington drainage basin with the Cedar River highlighted

- Location of the mouth of the Cedar River in Washington Cedar River (Washington) (the United States)

Location
- Country: United States
- State: Washington
- County: King
- Cities: Maple Valley, Renton

Physical characteristics
- Source: Cascade Range
  - coordinates: 47°18′47″N 121°31′17″W
  - elevation: 2,220 ft (680 m)
- Mouth: Lake Washington
  - coordinates: 47°30′2″N 122°12′58″W
  - elevation: 17 ft (5.2 m)
- Length: 45 mi (72 km)
- Basin size: 184 sq mi (480 km^{2})
- Discharge
  - location: Renton
  - average: 659 cu ft/s (18.7 m^{3}/s)
  - minimum: 30 cu ft/s (0.85 m^{3}/s)
  - maximum: 10,600 cu ft/s (300 m^{3}/s)

Basin features
- Tributaries
  - left: Rex River

The Cedar River is a river in the U.S. state of Washington. About 45 miles (72 km) long, it originates in the Cascade Range and flows generally west and northwest, emptying into the southern end of Lake Washington. Its upper watershed is a protected area called the Cedar River Watershed, which provides drinking water for the greater Seattle area.

The Cedar River drains into Puget Sound via Lake Washington and the Lake Washington Ship Canal.

== Course ==
The Cedar River originates in the Cascade Range near Abiel Peak, Meadow Mountain, and Yakima Pass, along the King and Kittitas countyline. Several headwater streams join in the high mountains fed from glacial runoff, then the Cedar River flows generally west. It is impounded in Chester Morse Lake, a natural lake that was dammed in 1900 for use as a water storage reservoir. The Rex River joins the Cedar in Chester Morse Lake, as do the two forks of the Cedar River, the north and south forks.

Below Chester Morse Lake, the Cedar River flows through a smaller lake called Masonry Pool. Below Masonry Pool, the Cedar River flows by two former railroad sites, Bagley Junction and Trude. The river then exits the Cedar River Watershed at Landsburg where pipelines route water to the Seattle area.

Below the Cedar River Watershed area, the river flows west and north, past the cities of Maple Valley and Renton. At Renton, the Cedar River empties into the southern end of Lake Washington. Its waters eventually enter Puget Sound via the Lake Washington Ship Canal.

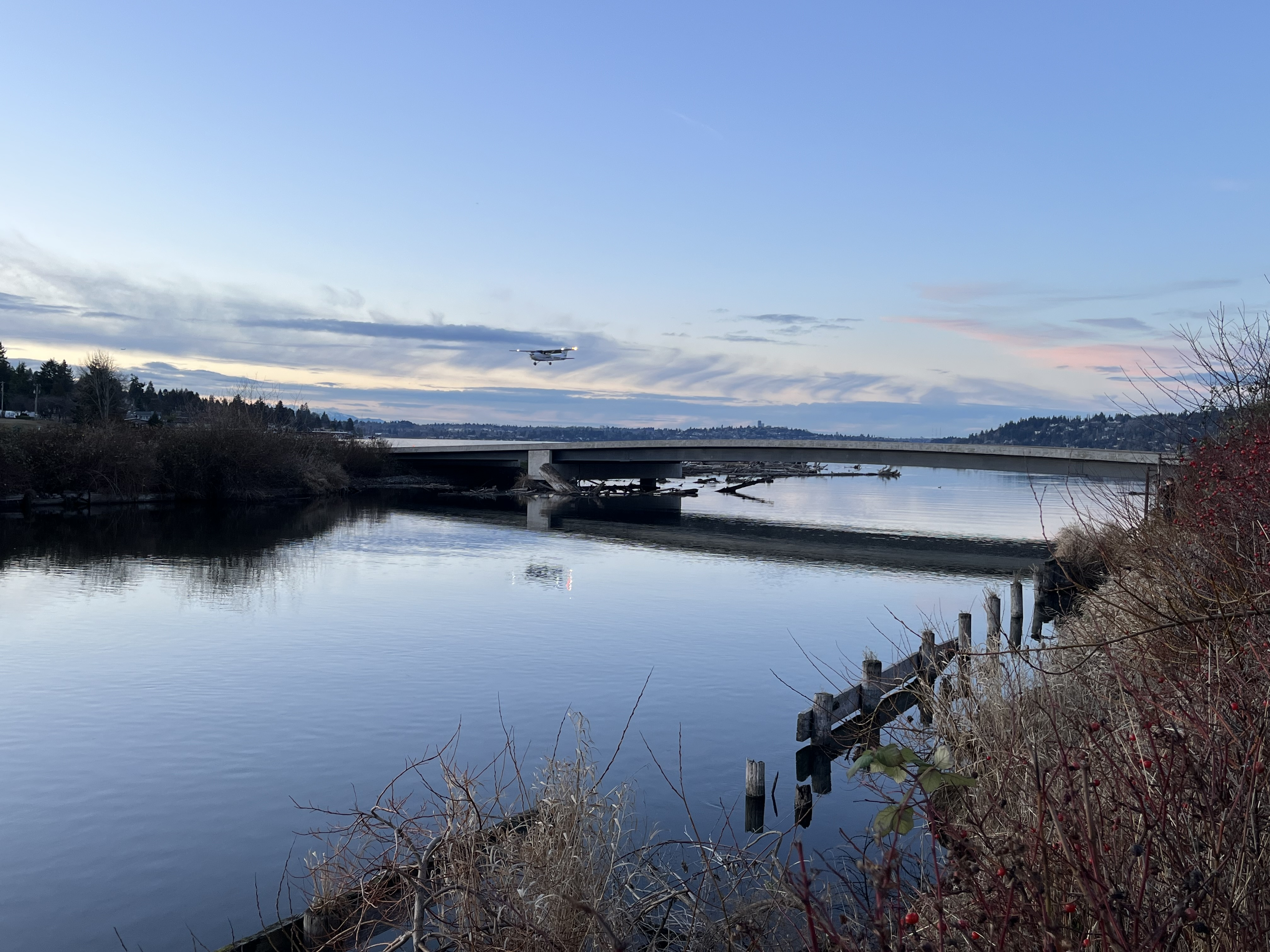
The scene at the mouth of the Cedar river where it flows into Lake Washington, as a plane comes in to land at the Renton Municipal Airport

== River modifications and management ==
The upper Cedar River watershed is a protected area called the Cedar River Municipal Watershed. About 90,000 acres (364 km^{2}) in size, it is owned by the City of Seattle. The Cedar River Watershed provides drinking water for 1.4 million people in the greater Seattle area. About two-thirds of King County uses water from the Cedar River Watershed, over 100 million US gallons (380,000 m^{3}) per day. The reservoirs and pipeline infrastructure is owned and operated by Seattle Public Utilities. Public access is restricted and the area is managed as a wilderness in order to protect water quality.

Chester Morse Lake is the main storage reservoir of the Cedar River Watershed system. Pipelines route water to the Seattle area from Landsburg, at the western edge of the protected watershed area.

Before 1912, the Cedar River did not empty into Lake Washington but rather into the Black River. The Black River drained the southern end of Lake Washington, flowing south then west to join the Green River. The Black–Green confluence created the Duwamish River, which emptied into Elliott Bay. In 1911, there was a major flood along the lower Cedar River. This prompted the city of Renton to make a diversion canal so that the Cedar River emptied into Lake Washington instead of the Black River. The diversion was completed in 1912. The Cedar River's water, via Lake Washington, still ultimately flowed into the Black River, Duwamish River, and into Elliott Bay.

In 1916, the Lake Washington Ship Canal's Montlake Cut was finished, connecting Lake Washington and Lake Union. The water level of Lake Washington dropped 8.8 feet (2.7 m), to the level of Lake Union. As a result, the outlet of Lake Washington became the Ship Canal instead of the Black River. The Black River dried up and no longer exists. Thus, today the Cedar River's water enters Lake Washington and then passes through the Ship Canal to Puget Sound, rather than into Elliott Bay via the Duwamish River. Anadromous fish, such as salmon, which used to migrate up the Duwamish and Black rivers to reach the Cedar River, now migrate through the Ship Canal and Lake Washington.

The upper Cedar River flows through a region of deep and porous glacial outwash. A large amount of water seeps into the ground, forming an aquifer. Most of this underground water eventually returns to the surface as springs, flowing mainly into the Cedar River as well as the Snoqualmie River and Rattlesnake Lake. This process acts as a kind of natural water filtration system. As a result, the Cedar River is one of the few rivers in the United States used for drinking water without requiring specially fabricated filtration.

South of the Cedar River Watershed is a similar protected area used for drinking water: the Green River Watershed, which supplies water to the greater Tacoma area.

The watershed also has an education center where visitors can learn about the issues that involve the region's drinking water, forest and wildlife.

== Environmental issues ==
The river has problems with invasive species, erosion, and pollution from adjacent properties and runoff. In 1996, the Friends of the Cedar River Watershed was formed to organize community involvement in protection of the river and its tributaries. The organization focused on education and ecological restoration. The three main programs The Friends of the Cedar River Watershed managed were the Cedar River Salmon Journey, Volunteer Habitat Restoration, and Stewardship in Action. The organization disbanded in 2015, and its programs were absorbed by other entities to continue the work in advocacy and education.

== History ==
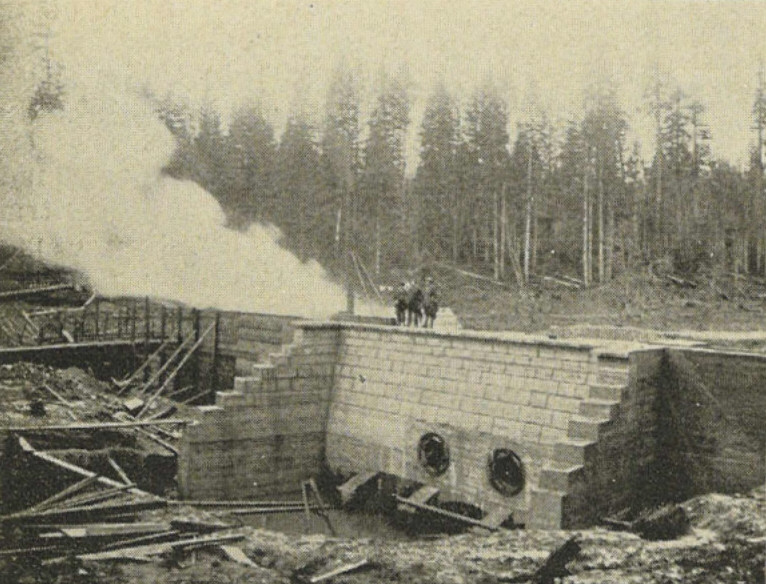
Headworks intake and wing dam on the Cedar River, 1900, part of the Seattle water supply system.

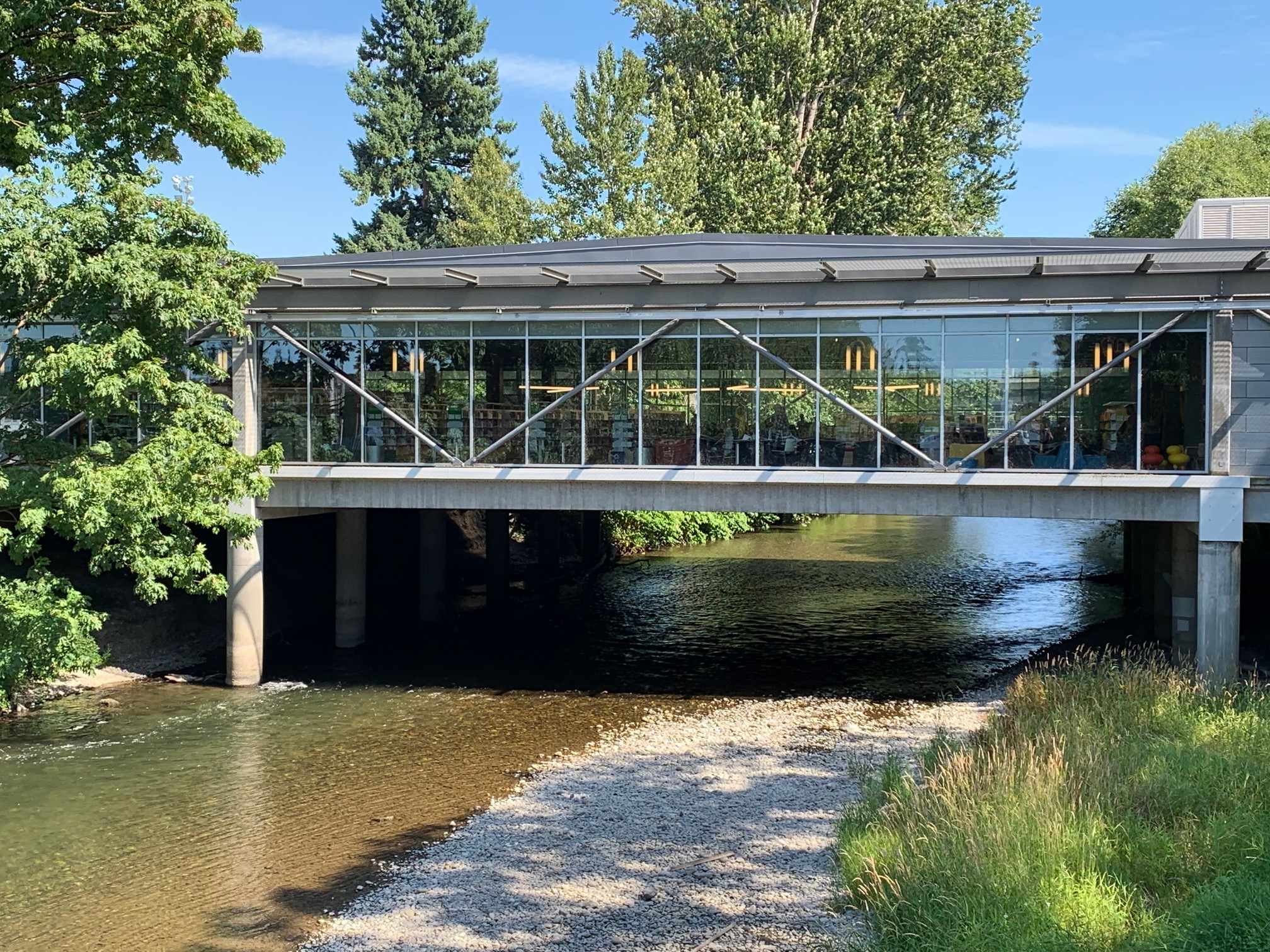
The Renton Public Library bridges the Cedar River.

Efforts to use the Cedar River as a water source began in the 1890s. A dam was built at Landsburg and water diverted into a 29-mile (47 km) pipeline. The pipeline sent water to Seattle's Volunteer Park and Lincoln reservoirs on Capitol Hill. The first deliveries occurred in 1901. A second pipeline was built in 1909 and a third in 1923.

Another reservoir was constructed in the early 1900s by the City of Seattle on an ancient glacial lake bed. The city constructed a ninety-foot concrete dam and used bedrock to the west and a glacial moraine to the east as natural barriers. The reservoir was known as the Cedar Reservoir and was fed by the Cedar River Drainage. Between the hours of 12AM and 2AM on December 23, 1918, a large section of the Cedar Reservoir failed and spilled between 800,000 and 2,000,000 cubic yards of water. The discharge flowed down Boxley Creek Valley, destroying the town of Edgewick, sawmills (owned by North Bend Lumber Company), and parts of the Milwaukee Railroad. The failure did not occur at the dam, but 6,000 feet on the moraine side of the reservoir. Initial discharge rates were estimated between 3,000 and 20,000 second-feet.

By 1899 the City of Seattle had acquired ownership of most of the Cedar River Watershed. Some land remained privately owned, mainly by logging companies and sawmills. Before 1924 large sections of the forest were cut for timber. Wildfires burned more forests in the wake of logging operations. In 1924 the City of Seattle began the process of managing the Cedar River Watershed with a plan of ensuring water quality for the future. Logging continued, but methods were increasingly regulated and fire precautions strengthened. The 1962 Cedar River Watershed Cooperative Agreement began the process of transferring the remaining privately owned land to the City of Seattle. In 1996 the United States Forest Service ceded its land in the watershed to Seattle. As a result, the city is the sole owner of the Cedar River Watershed area of the upper Cedar River.

== Natural history ==
Due to logging in the early 20th century, only about 17%, or 14,000 acres (57 km^{2}), of the Cedar River Watershed consists of old growth forest. The majority of the forest remaining today is second growth forest.

The Cedar River Watershed provides habitat for a variety of wildlife. The river provides habitat for anadromous fish including Chinook salmon, Coho salmon, Sockeye salmon, and Steelhead trout. Deforestation and associated erosion in the early 20th century resulted in a degraded habitat for wildlife. Starting in the late 20th century efforts began to be made to protect and restore the river and its watershed. Salmon runs have been a major topic of concern, with work underway to recreate spawning channels, proper salmon habitat zones, and fish ladders. To address low counts on the river, with only 10,000 counted beyond Lake Washington by the early 2020s, the Muckleshoot Tribe began trucking 1,500 spawning salmon from the Ballard Locks to the Cedar River.

== See also ==
- Seattle Municipal Light and Power Plant
- List of Washington rivers
- History of Seattle 1900–1940
