= Rex River =

- Location of the mouth of the Rex River in Washington Rex River (the United States)

Location
- Country: United States
- State: Washington
- County: King

Physical characteristics
- Source: Cascade Range
  - coordinates: 47°18′7″N 121°36′9″W
- Mouth: Cedar River
  - location: Chester Morse Lake
  - coordinates: 47°22′43″N 121°41′48″W
- Basin size: 13.4 sq mi (35 km^{2})
- Discharge
  - location: river mile 3.0
  - average: 100 cu ft/s (2.8 m^{3}/s)
  - minimum: 3.0 cu ft/s (0.085 m^{3}/s)
  - maximum: 4,200 cu ft/s (120 m^{3}/s)

The Rex River is a river in the U.S. state of Washington. It originates near the crest of the Cascade Mountains and flows northwest to join the Cedar River in the Chester Morse Lake reservoir. The Cedar River flows to Lake Washington and, ultimately, Puget Sound. Tributaries of the Rex River include Pine Creek, Lindsay Creek, and Boulder Creek.

The Rex River is entirely contained within the Cedar River Municipal Watershed, an area managed by the City of Seattle which provides two-thirds of the water supply for the greater Seattle metropolitan region.

== See also ==
- List of rivers of Washington (state)
