= Renton, Washington =

Renton
- City
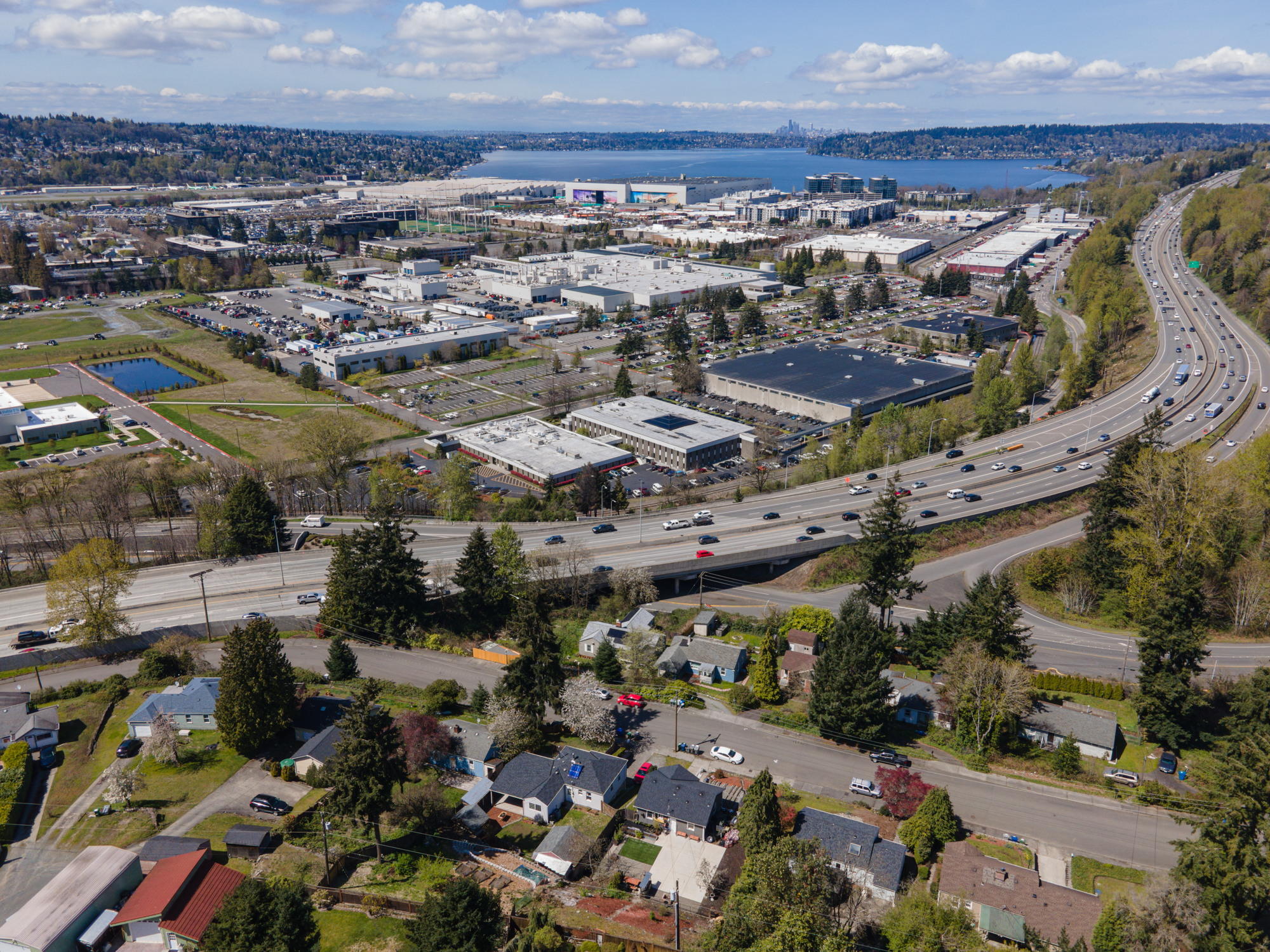
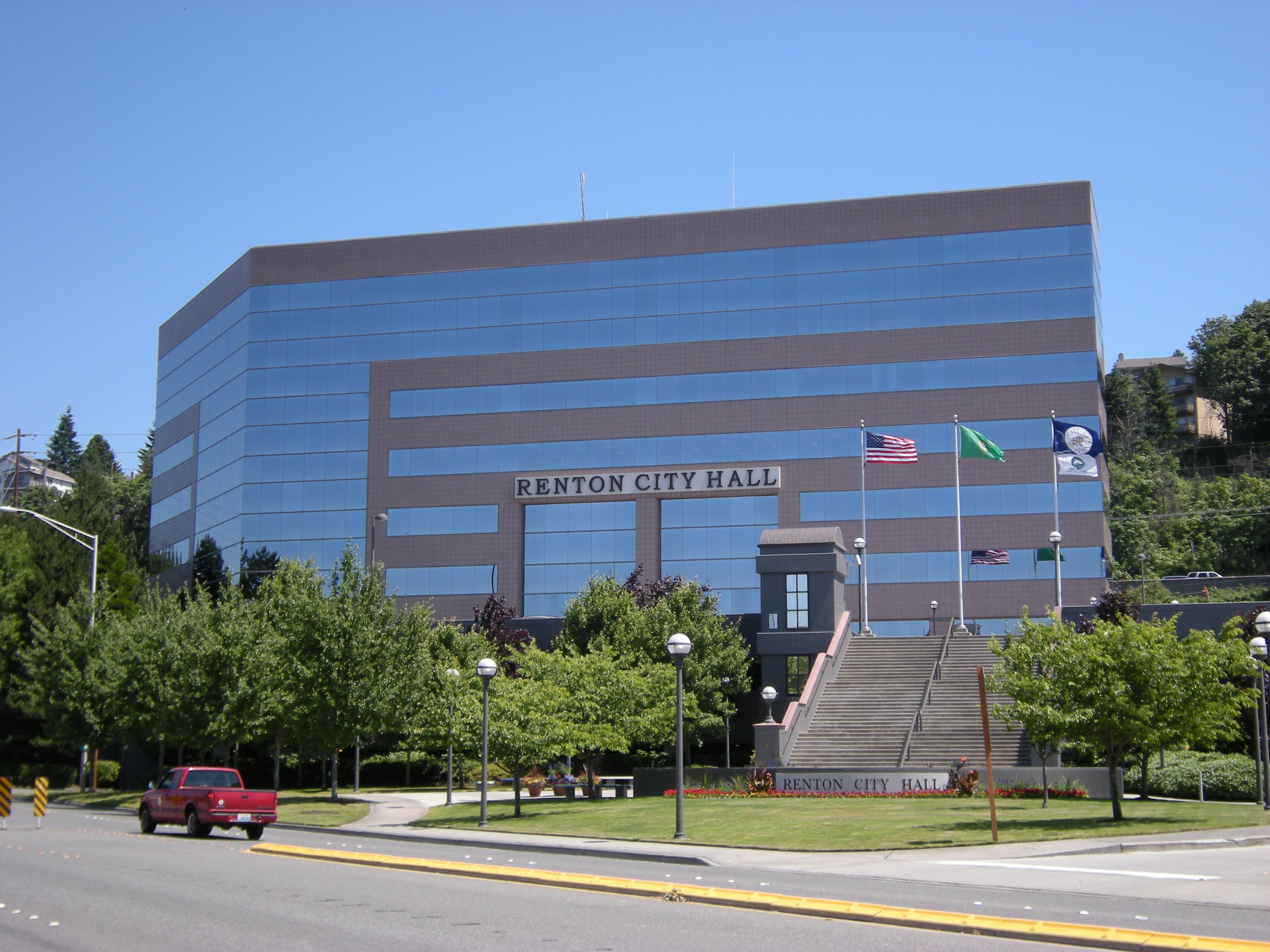
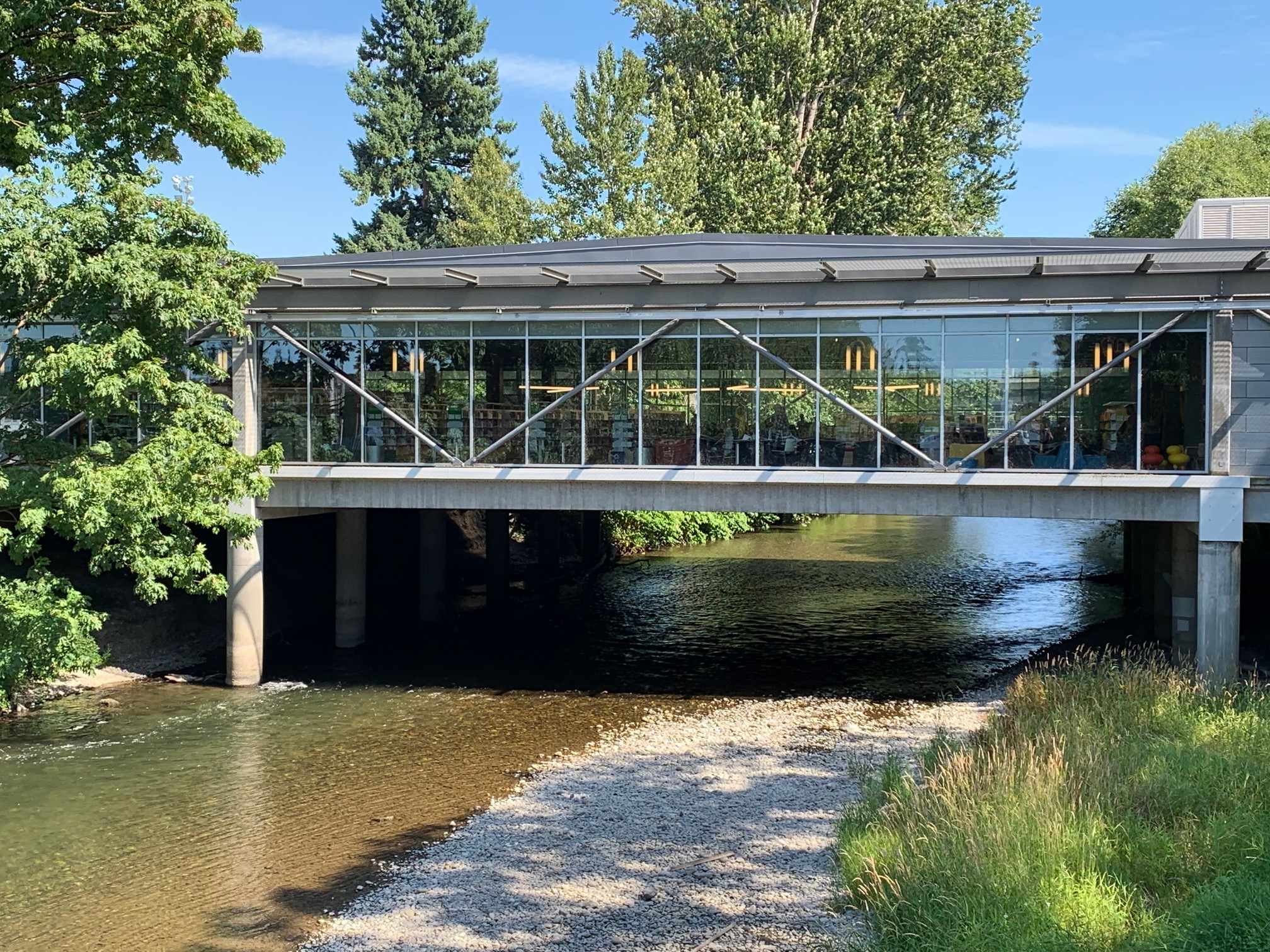
- Aerial view of Renton Renton City Hall Renton Public Library

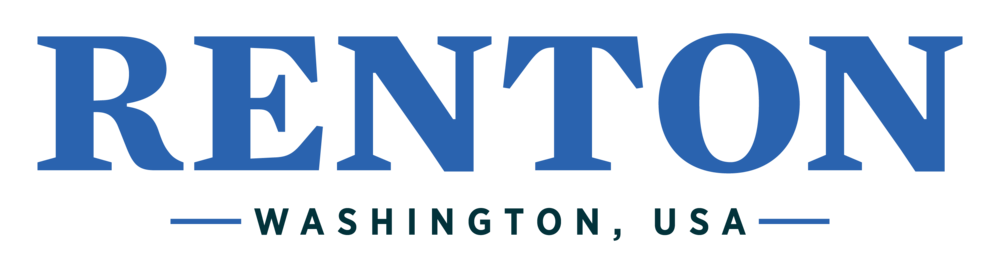
- Wordmark
- Interactive location map of Renton
- Coordinates: 47°28′43″N 122°11′30″W
- Country: United States
- State: Washington
- County: King
- Founded: August 18, 1885
- Incorporated: September 6, 1901

Government
  - Type: Mayor–council
  - Mayor: Armondo Pavone
  - City Council: James Alberson, Jr. Ryan McIrvin; Valerie O'Halloran; Ruth Pérez; Ed Prince; Carmen Rivera; Kim-Khánh Văn

Area
  - City: 25.27 sq mi (65.45 km^{2})
  - Land: 23.54 sq mi (60.97 km^{2})
  - Water: 1.73 sq mi (4.47 km^{2})
- Elevation: 85 ft (26 m)

Population (2020)
  - City: 106,785
  - Estimate (2024): 105,543
  - Rank: US: 311th WA: 9th
  - Density: 4,439.3/sq mi (1,714.01/km^{2})
  - Urban: 3,544,011 (US: 13th)
  - Metro: 4,044,837 (US: 15th)
- Time zone: UTC−8 (Pacific (PST))
  - Summer (DST): UTC−7 (PDT)
- ZIP Codes: 98055, 98056, 98057, 98058, 98059
- Area code: 425
- FIPS code: 53-57745
- GNIS feature ID: 2410926
- Website: rentonwa.gov

Renton is a city in King County, Washington, United States, and an inner-ring suburb of Seattle. Situated 11 miles (18 km) southeast of Seattle, Renton straddles the southeast shore of Lake Washington, at the mouth of the Cedar River. As of the 2020 census, the population of Renton was 106,785, up from 90,927 at the 2010 census. The city is currently the 6th most populous municipality in greater Seattle and the 8th most populous city in Washington.

After a long history as an important salmon fishing area for Native Americans, Renton was first settled by people of European descent in the 1860s. Its early economy was based on coal mining, clay production, and timber export. Today, Renton is best known as the final assembly point for the Boeing 737 family of commercial airplanes, but it is also home to a growing number of well-known manufacturing, technology, and healthcare organizations, including Boeing Commercial Airplanes Division, Paccar, Kaiser Permanente, Providence Health & Services, UW Medicine, and Wizards of the Coast.

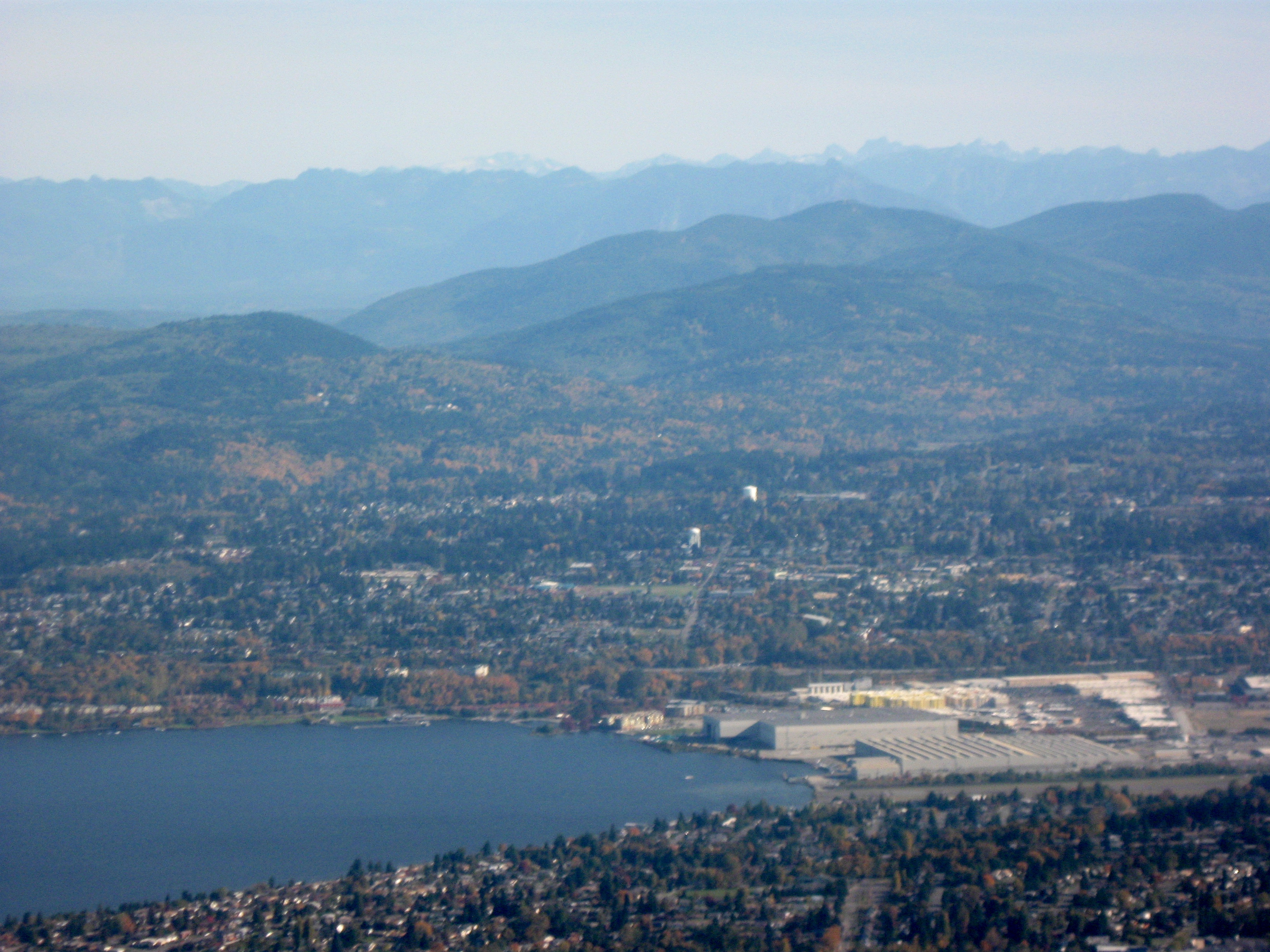
Aerial view of the south end of Lake Washington with a view of Renton Boeing plant at the tip

== History ==
Long a cultural center for the Duwamish, European settlers arrived in the area of present-day Renton as early as 1853. First among them were Henry Tobin and his wife Diana. The town of Renton was accessed via the Seattle and Walla Walla Railroad, the first railroad to be built to Seattle, and was in the vicinity of several coal mines that attracted entrepreneurs like Erasmus M. Smithers, who is credited with the founding and establishment of the town in 1875. Smithers named Renton in honor of Captain William Renton, a local lumber and shipping merchant who invested heavily in the coal trade. Smithers discovered coal there and brought in Charles D. Shattuck as the coal mine operator.

Renton was incorporated as a city on September 6, 1901, when coal mining and timber processing were the most important economic industries in the area. The town was prone to flooding from the Cedar River and Black River. In 1916 the completion of the Lake Washington Ship Canal lowered the surface of Lake Washington by several feet which consequently eliminated drainage of Lake Washington through the Black River (in favor of the Ship Canal). The Cedar River was then diverted to drain into Lake Washington instead of into the Black River. As a result, the Black River largely disappeared, leaving only a few remnants. The culmination of these actions reduced the threat of annual flooding.

The population sharply increased during World War II when Boeing built their Renton Factory to produce the B-29 Superfortress. Renton grew from a population of 4,488 in 1940 to 16,039 in 1950.

The game company Wizards of the Coast also is headquartered in Renton. Providence Health System has centralized its administrative offices in Renton, along with Group Health Cooperative.

Owing to its location at the confluence of three major freeways (I-5, I-405, and SR 167), Renton's economic development team has lured a number of specialty retailers that draw consumers from around the region, including IKEA. Some retail establishments were unwanted though, and the city successfully defended zoning restrictions on pornographic theaters before the U.S. Supreme Court in Renton v. Playtime Theatres, Inc.

The Renton Public Library was built directly over the Cedar River and opened in 1966. It stretches 80 feet (24 m) across the river, next to Liberty Park, and was the main branch of the city's independent library system until its 2010 annexation into the King County Library system.

=== 21st-century redevelopment ===
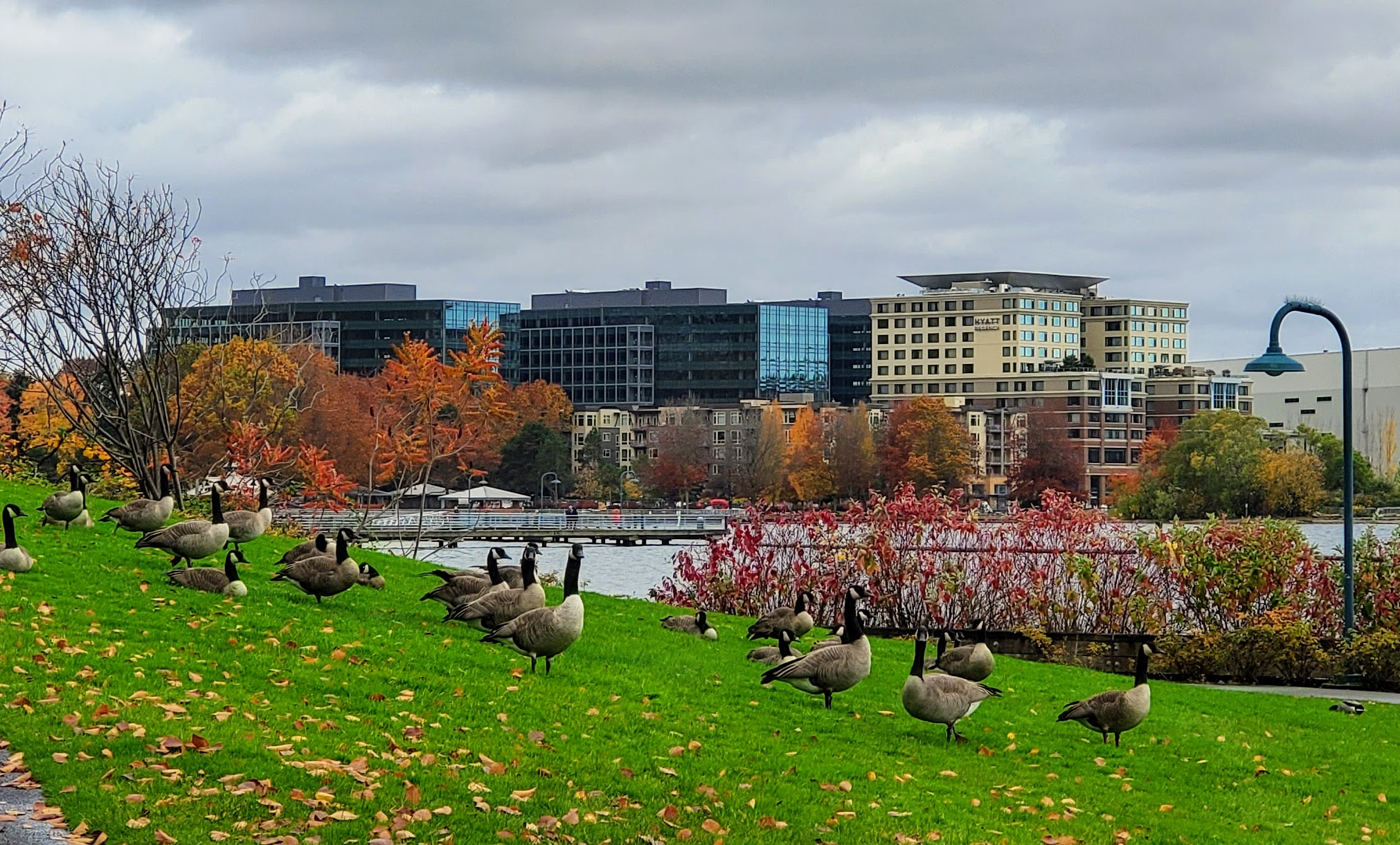
Renton skyline along Lake Washington, featuring the Southport development

The city government has encouraged redevelopment of industrial areas around Downtown Renton and near Southcenter since the 1980s. The first IKEA in the Pacific Northwest opened in Renton in 1994 at a former Boeing building; the original building was replaced by a new store on the same site in 2017. The former Longacres horse-racing track was redeveloped in the 1990s to support offices for Boeing and the Federal Reserve Bank, which moved from its Seattle building. Port Quendall, a land parcel in north Renton, is home to the Virginia Mason Athletic Center (VMAC), housing the Seattle Seahawks Headquarters and training facility that opened in August 2008; before then, the Seahawks trained in Kirkland.

In the mid-1990s, Renton undertook a major redevelopment effort to revitalize its downtown core, which had declined in commercial prominence since the opening of the Southcenter Mall in Tukwila in 1968. The many car dealerships that had previously occupied the center of downtown Renton were encouraged through economic incentives to relocate to a newly created auto sales zone close to the I-405/SR-167 interchange. In place of the old dealerships downtown, a new transit center and parking garage were built in partnership with King County Metro. The transit center is surrounded by several multi-family residential buildings and a small town square named Piazza Park, which hosts a weekly farmers' market.

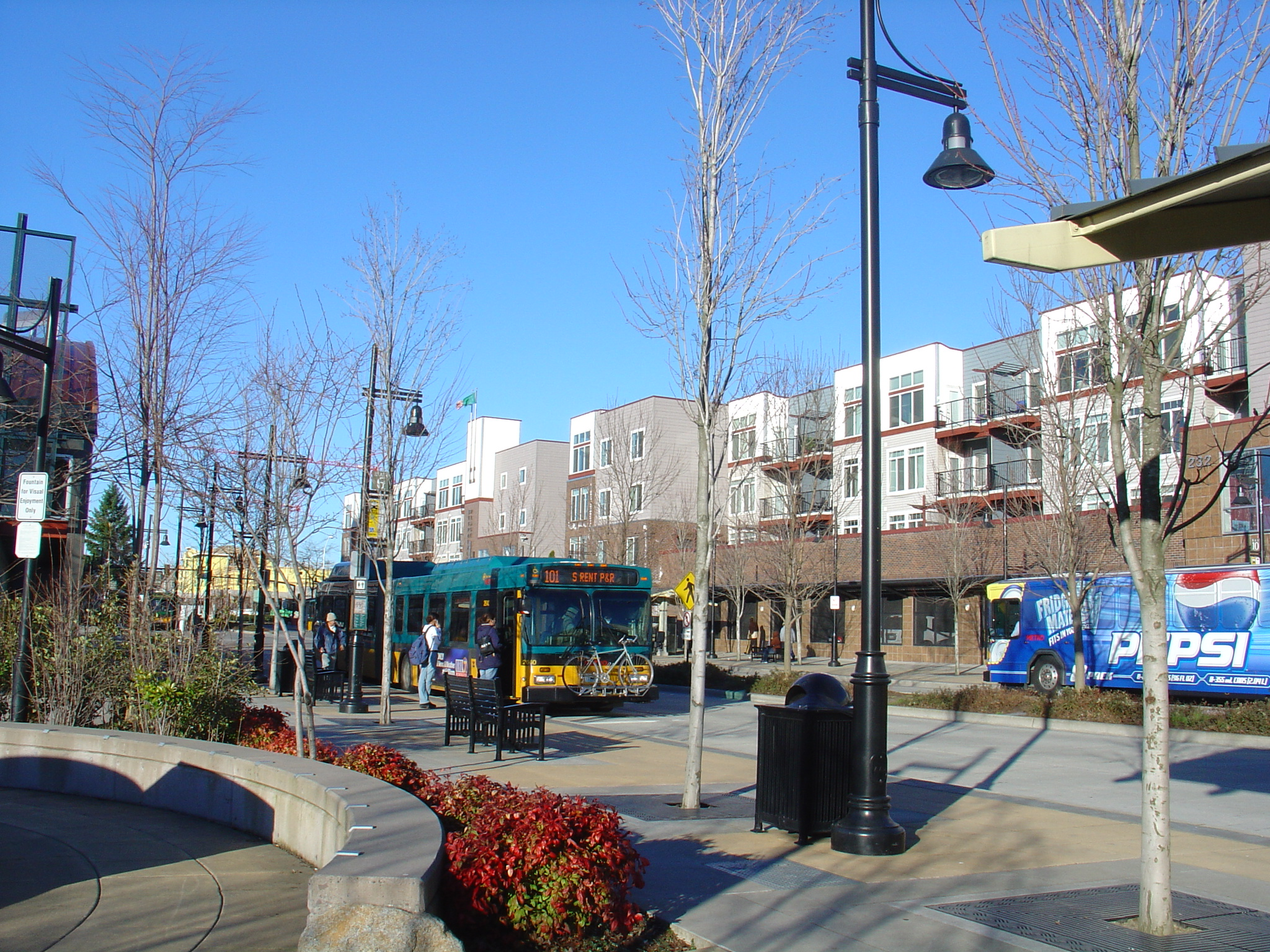
Renton Transit Center

Centered on former Boeing Co. property near the south shore of Lake Washington is a 68-acre (280,000 m^{2}) residential and commercial development named The Landing. To the north of the Landing, a hotel and office development on the lakefront called Southport has been developed at the site of the former Shuffleton power plant, which was demolished in 2001. A 347-room hotel operated under the Hyatt Regency brand opened in June 2017.

In 2017, Bosa Development announced plans to build five residential towers between 16 and 23 stories at Quendall Terminals, a Superfund site in Renton on the shore of Lake Washington. The proposal was never formally approved by the city government, which had permitted six-story buildings on the site, and was dropped in 2024.

== Geography ==
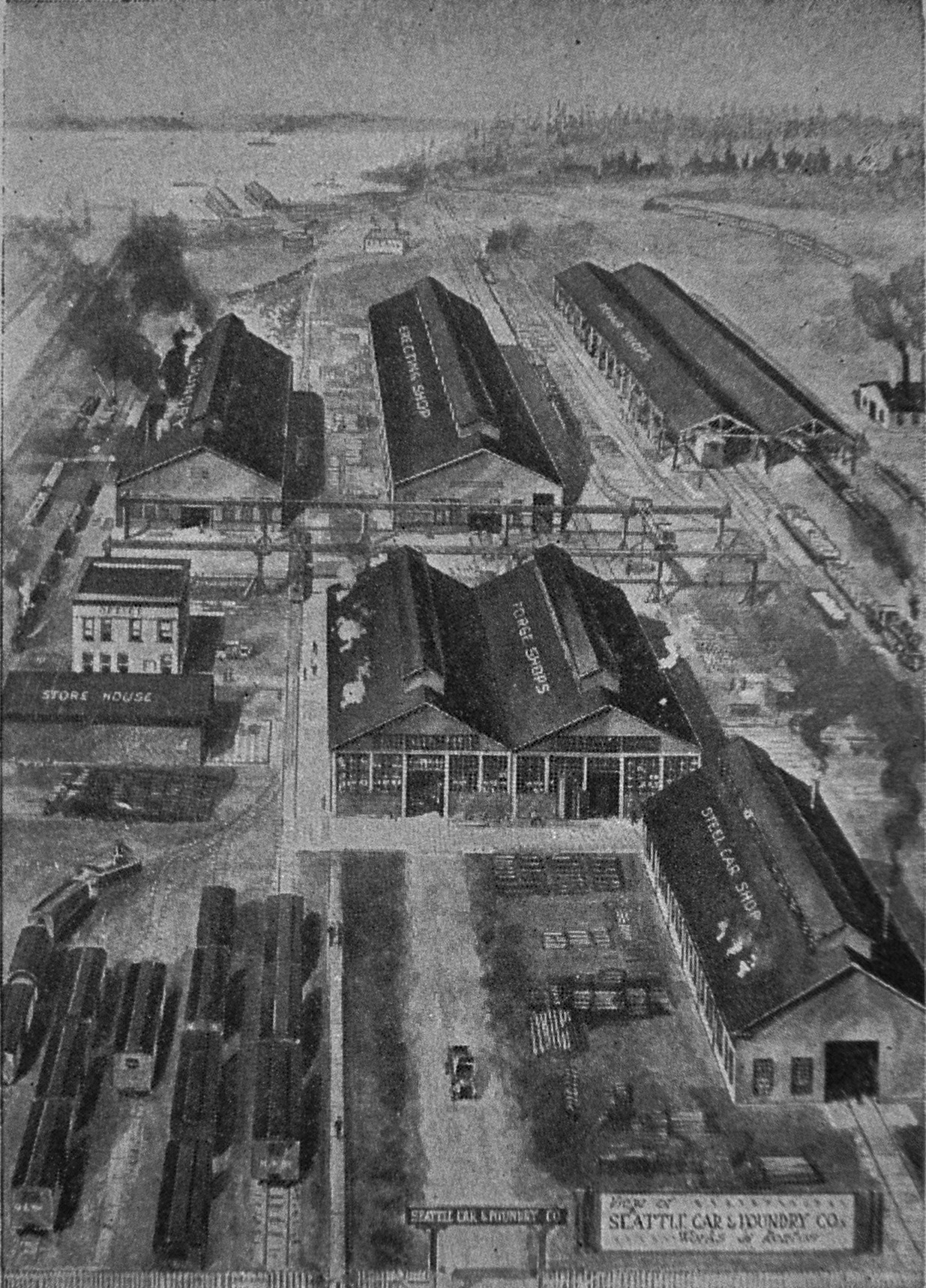
Seattle Car and Foundry works (Paccar) plant in Renton 1916

Renton is located on the southeast shore of Lake Washington at the mouth of the Cedar River. The city is bordered to the north by Newcastle. Along the east side of Renton is the urban growth boundary established by King County, as such there is no incorporated city directly east of Renton. The southern border is shared with Kent, while the western border consists of the city of Tukwila and the unincorporated community of West Hill.

The geographical characteristics of Renton's eastern border are varied and include (from north to south) the south flank of Cougar Mountain descending southward merging with the community of May Valley. The terrain then elevates south of May Valley to the communities of the East Renton Plateau before descending to the north bank of the Cedar River.

According to the United States Census Bureau, the city has a total area of 25.27 square miles (65.45 km^{2}), of which 23.54 square miles (60.97 km^{2}) is land and 1.73 square miles (4.48 km^{2}) is water, most of which is the Cedar River.

Potential Annexation Areas (PAAs) include the communities of Fairwood southeast of Renton, the East Renton Plateau on the eastern edge of Renton, and West Hill northwest of Renton. These communities are large unincorporated urban areas that are encouraged by the King County Annexation Initiative to incorporate as cities or annex into neighboring cities. As of 2012 these three PAAs are not part of the City of Renton, and not included in its demographics or statistics.

Renton is one of the cities in the Puget Sound region with an independent street grid system. Roads names beginning with sectional divisions (N 32nd Street) generally follow a latitudinal direction, while roads names ending in a sectional direction (Duvall Ave NE) generally follow a longitudinal direction. Many of the avenues in the city are named in honor of other cities in Washington.

=== Areas ===
Downtown Renton
In 2015, ESRI estimated that in Downtown Renton the total population was 3,019 and the average household income was $50,809.
North Renton
In 2015, ESRI estimated that in North Renton the total population was 8,211 and the average household income was $79,387.
Northeast Renton
In 2015, ESRI estimated that in Northeast Renton the total population was 44,626 and the average household income was $93,556.
Southeast Renton
In 2015, ESRI estimated that in Southeast Renton the total population was 39,066 and the average household income was $78,424.
Southwest Renton
In 2015, ESRI estimated that in Southwest Renton the total population was 3,551 and the average household income was $64,661.

=== Climate ===
Renton has a warm-summer Mediterranean climate (Köppen: Csb) with warm and dry summers mixed with cloudy, wet and cool winters, with a precipitation regime typical of the Pacific Northwest. Being located in a partial rain shadow and shielded from the coastal summers, Renton has more of a climate influenced by the interior than many other areas nearby.

Climate data for Renton, Washington
Month	Jan	Feb	Mar	Apr	May	Jun	Jul	Aug	Sep	Oct	Nov	Dec	Year
Record high °F (°C)	64 (18)	71 (22)	81 (27)	86 (30)	92 (33)	108 (42)	104 (40)	99 (37)	96 (36)	86 (30)	74 (23)	69 (21)	108 (42)
Mean daily maximum °F (°C)	43 (6)	47 (8)	54 (12)	61 (16)	67 (19)	72 (22)	79 (26)	80 (27)	73 (23)	62 (17)	52 (11)	45 (7)	61 (16)
Mean daily minimum °F (°C)	32 (0)	35 (2)	39 (4)	42 (6)	47 (8)	53 (12)	56 (13)	57 (14)	51 (11)	44 (7)	39 (4)	34 (1)	44 (7)
Record low °F (°C)	−10 (−23)	−5 (−21)	10 (−12)	25 (−4)	27 (−3)	33 (1)	38 (3)	34 (1)	28 (−2)	24 (−4)	−1 (−18)	3 (−16)	−10 (−23)
Average precipitation inches (mm)	5.3 (130)	4.5 (110)	4.1 (100)	2.9 (74)	2.1 (53)	1.7 (43)	0.9 (23)	1.2 (30)	1.8 (46)	3.4 (86)	6.1 (150)	5.8 (150)	37.1 (940)
Source: Weather.com

== Demographics ==
Historical population
Census	Pop.	Note	%±
1880	200		—
1890	406		103.0%
1900	412		1.5%
1910	2,740		565.0%
1920	3,301		20.5%
1930	4,062		23.1%
1940	4,488		10.5%
1950	16,039		257.4%
1960	18,453		15.1%
1970	25,878		40.2%
1980	31,031		19.9%
1990	41,688		34.3%
2000	50,052		20.1%
2010	90,927		81.7%
2020	106,785		17.4%
2024 (est.)	105,543		−1.2%
U.S. Decennial Census; 2020 Census

As of the 2023 American Community Survey, there are 40,968 estimated households in Renton with an average of 2.53 persons per household. The city has a median household income of $100,237. Approximately 7.9% of the city's population lives at or below the poverty line. Renton has an estimated 71.7% employment rate, with 38.4% of the population holding a bachelor's degree or higher and 86.2% holding a high school diploma.

The top five reported ancestries (people were allowed to report up to two ancestries, thus the figures will generally add to more than 100%) were English (59.2%), Spanish (12.8%), Indo-European (7.0%), Asian and Pacific Islander (16.4%), and Other (4.6%).

=== Racial and ethnic composition ===
Renton, Washington – racial and ethnic composition Note: the US Census treats Hispanic/Latino as an ethnic category. This table excludes Latinos from the racial categories and assigns them to a separate category. Hispanics/Latinos may be of any race.
Race / ethnicity (NH = non-Hispanic)	Pop. 2000	Pop. 2010	Pop. 2020	% 2000	% 2010	% 2020
White alone (NH)	32,759	44,937	42,449	65.45%	49.42%	39.75%
Black or African American alone (NH)	4,142	9,435	10,585	8.28%	10.38%	9.91%
Native American or Alaska Native alone (NH)	335	423	463	0.67%	0.47%	0.43%
Asian alone (NH)	6,658	19,148	27,721	13.30%	21.06%	25.96%
Pacific Islander alone (NH)	238	635	818	0.48%	0.70%	0.77%
Other race alone (NH)	153	169	637	0.31%	0.19%	0.60%
Mixed race or multiracial (NH)	1,949	4,233	7,602	3.89%	4.66%	7.12%
Hispanic or Latino (any race)	3,818	11,947	16,510	7.63%	13.14%	15.46%
Total	50,052	90,927	106,785	100.00%	100.00%	100.00%

=== 2020 census ===
As of the 2020 census, Renton had a population of 106,785, with 41,433 households and 25,537 families; the median age was 36.9 years. 21.0% of residents were under the age of 18, 6.5% were under the age of 5, and 12.8% were 65 years of age or older. For every 100 females there were 99.0 males, and for every 100 females age 18 and over there were 97.4 males age 18 and over.

The population density was 4,549.1 inhabitants per square mile (1,756.4/km^{2}). There were 43,362 housing units at an average density of 1,847.2 inhabitants per square mile (713.2/km^{2}), of which 4.4% were vacant; the homeowner vacancy rate was 1.0% and the rental vacancy rate was 5.2%.

100.0% of residents lived in urban areas, while 0.0% lived in rural areas.

Racial composition as of the 2020 census
Race	Number	Percent
White	44,704	41.9%
Black or African American	10,838	10.1%
American Indian and Alaska Native	984	0.9%
Asian	27,917	26.1%
Native Hawaiian and Other Pacific Islander	847	0.8%
Some other race	9,065	8.5%
Two or more races	12,430	11.6%
Hispanic or Latino (of any race)	16,510	15.5%

=== 2010 census ===
As of the 2010 census, there were 90,927 people, 36,009 households, and 21,849 families residing in the city. The population density was 3,932.8 inhabitants per square mile (1,518.5/km^{2}). There were 38,930 housing units at an average density of 1,683.8 inhabitants per square mile (650.1/km^{2}). The racial makeup of the city was 54.64% White, 10.63% African American, 0.66% Native American, 21.22% Asian, 0.75% Pacific Islander, 6.24% from some other races and 5.85% from two or more races. Hispanic or Latino people of any race were 13.14% of the population.

There were 36,009 households, of which 32.4% had children under the age of 18 living with them, 43.2% were married couples living together, 11.9% had a female householder with no husband present, 5.5% had a male householder with no wife present, and 39.3% were non-families. 30.3% of all households were made up of individuals, and 7.9% had someone living alone who was 65 years of age or older. The average household size was 2.51 and the average family size was 3.16.

The median age in the city was 35.2 years. 23.2% of residents were under the age of 18; 8.8% were between the ages of 18 and 24; 33.5% were from 25 to 44; 24.4% were from 45 to 64; and 10.1% were 65 years of age or older. The gender makeup of the city was 49.5% male and 50.5% female.

== Economy ==
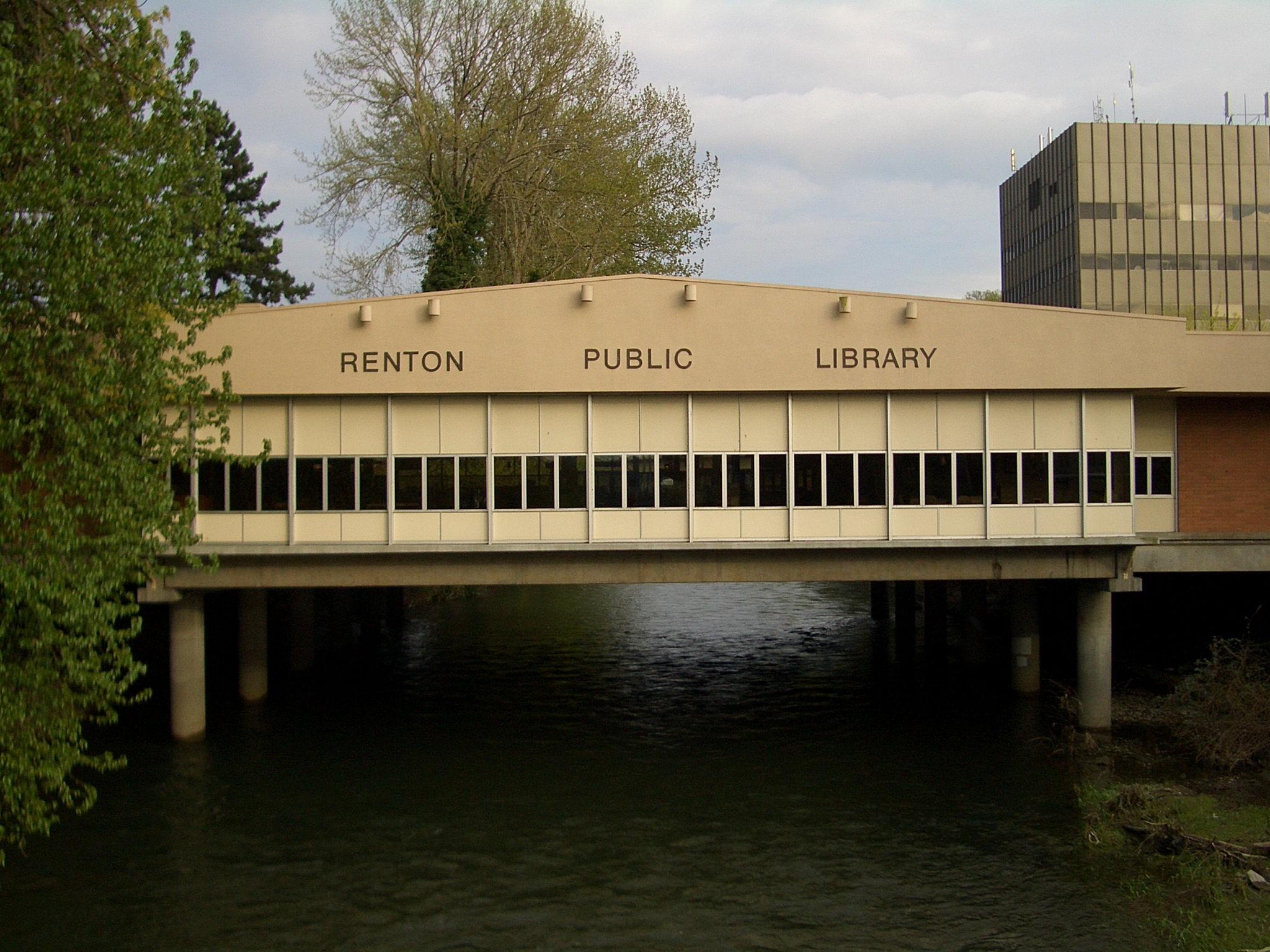
Renton Public Library straddles the Cedar River.

Boeing Commercial Airplanes, Boeing Capital, Providence Health & Services, and Wizards of the Coast have their headquarters in Renton.

The Boeing Renton Factory has operated since World War II, when it manufactured the B-29 Superfortress; currently, it produces the 737 airliner. The Renton plant produced the Jetfoil and Pegasus class hydrofoils in the 1970s. As of 2001, 40% of all commercial aircraft in the air were assembled in Renton. Boeing remains the largest employer in Renton, which is home to over 10,000 employees and three of the aerospace giant's six major business divisions: Boeing Commercial Airplanes, Boeing Capital Corporation and the Shared Services Group. The local newspaper in the 1970s, the Record-Chronicle, proclaimed the city the jet capital of the world.

Paccar has traditionally been a large employer in the city as well with its Kenworth Truck plant located in Renton's industrial area on the south end of Lake Washington. In 1907 the Seattle Car Manufacturing Co. moved to a large manufacturing plant in Renton after a fire destroyed the original plant in Seattle. The Car Company was the only manufacturer of train cars on the West Coast.

The Renton plant expanded its foundry capabilities in 1911, and Seattle Car and Foundry Co merged with the Twohy Brothers of Portland in 1917 and became the Pacific Car and Foundry Company or Paccar. During the Great Depression, the Renton Paccar plant developed power winches for use in the logging industry. When World War II arrived, the Renton manufacturing switched its production towards the war effort, and by the war's end in 1945 had built 1,500 Sherman Tanks. In the second half of the 20th century there was not enough repeat business for Paccar-built train cars as rail equipment in 1965 came to only 1/3 of the company's sales. Thus the Paccar Renton plant began manufacturing structural steel until the 1970s recession. In the early 1980s the Paccar Railcar Division, the last remnants of the original Pacific Car and Foundry Co., closed down. In 1993, a new Kenworth assembly plant opened on the former site of Pacific Car and Foundry.

=== Employment ===
As of the city's 2023 Annual Comprehensive Financial Report (ACFR), Renton had 34,882 employed individuals; Renton's top employers were:

Rank	Employer	Employees in 2023	Employees in 2014
1	Boeing Company	▼12,919	15,201
2	Valley Medical Center	▲4,304	2,173
3	Renton School District No. 403	▲2,659	1,507
4	Kaiser Permanente	▲2,550	-
5	Providence Washington Regional Services	▲2,050	1,851
6	Paccar	▲1,827	1,254
7	Healthpoint	▲1,237	-
8	Wizards of the Coast	▲1,033	425
9	Blue Origin	▲826	-
10	Seattle Seahawks	▲674	-

== Education ==
Renton Technical College, originally opened in 1942 as a war production school, offers associate degrees and certificates of completion in professional-technical fields. Renton also has a branch of the Pima Medical Institute, a for-profit medical vocational college, that opened in September 2004.

The Renton School District provides K–12 public schooling. Additionally, the Issaquah School District serves a small portion of unincorporated Renton neighborhoods. The Tahoma School District serves a small portion of Renton along Maple Valley Highway. The Kent School District serves the majority of Fairwood, a census-designated place between Renton and Maple Valley.

The Renton School District includes the four high schools: Hazen High School, Lindbergh High School, Renton High School, and Albert Talley Senior High School. The school district also has four middle schools and fifteen elementary schools.

Parts of the city are also served by the Issaquah School District, Kent School District, and the Tahoma School District, all of which predominantly serve neighboring cities.

== Government ==
Renton has a mayor–council government that oversees municipal services and contracts with other entities for utilities. The mayor and seven councilmembers are elected to four-year terms in staggered, at-large elections. Councilmembers are divided into working committees that recommend legislation to the whole council in meetings. Renton also has a housing authority to provide low cost housing to poorer residents.

== Sister cities ==
Renton has two sister cities:

- Nishiwaki, Hyogo, Japan (since 1969)
- Cuautla, Jalisco, Mexico (since 2001)

== Transportation ==
Renton is served by King County Metro and Sound Transit Express buses. Metro operates the RapidRide F Line through the city and plans to expand bus rapid transit service in the 2020s; Sound Transit is scheduled to open its own bus rapid transit service, Stride, through Renton in 2028. A new transit center for Stride south of downtown Renton began construction in 2026. The existing Renton Transit Center in downtown was built in 2001 by King County Metro and includes a parking garage with 150 stalls.

The city government owns and operates Renton Municipal Airport (KRNT), officially Clayton Scott Field, a public airport at the foot of Lake Washington. It is used by the Boeing Renton Factory as well as for charter services and flight training.

The BNSF Railway operates a freight railroad through Renton that includes a brief street-running portion on Houser Way in downtown. The railroad carries Boeing 737 fuselages bound for the Boeing assembly plant north of downtown. A second line with street-running portions, along Burnett Avenue to serve the Paccar plant, was removed in 1972 to eliminate 18 grade crossings. BNSF also owned the Woodinville Subdivision, a branch line on the east side of Lake Washington, which was used by the Spirit of Washington dinner train. The excursion service ran from Renton to Woodinville from 1992 to 2007. The Woodinville Subdivision was converted to a multi-use trail, known as Eastrail, by the King County government in 2018.

== Notable people ==
- Val Caniparoli, ballet dancer and choreographer
- Jamal Crawford, basketball player
- Joshua Farris, figure skater, was born in Renton
- Avery Garrett, former mayor of Renton (1969) and state legislator
- Yeimar Gómez Andrade, professional soccer player
- Gary Grant (serial killer), serial killer
- Jimi Hendrix, musician
- Sally Jewell, 51st United States Secretary of the Interior and former CEO of REI
- Sean Kinney, drummer for Alice in Chains
- Zach LaVine, basketball player
- Sam Longoria, Hollywood producer-director
- Rick May, voice actor and theatrical director and actor
- Rashaad Powell, basketball player
- Emily Rose, actress
- Brandon Roy, basketball player
- Doug Sisk, baseball player
- Aretha Thurmond, Olympic discus thrower
- Jacob Young, actor and producer

== See also ==
- Valley Medical Center
