= Renton Public Library =

Public library in Washington state, United States

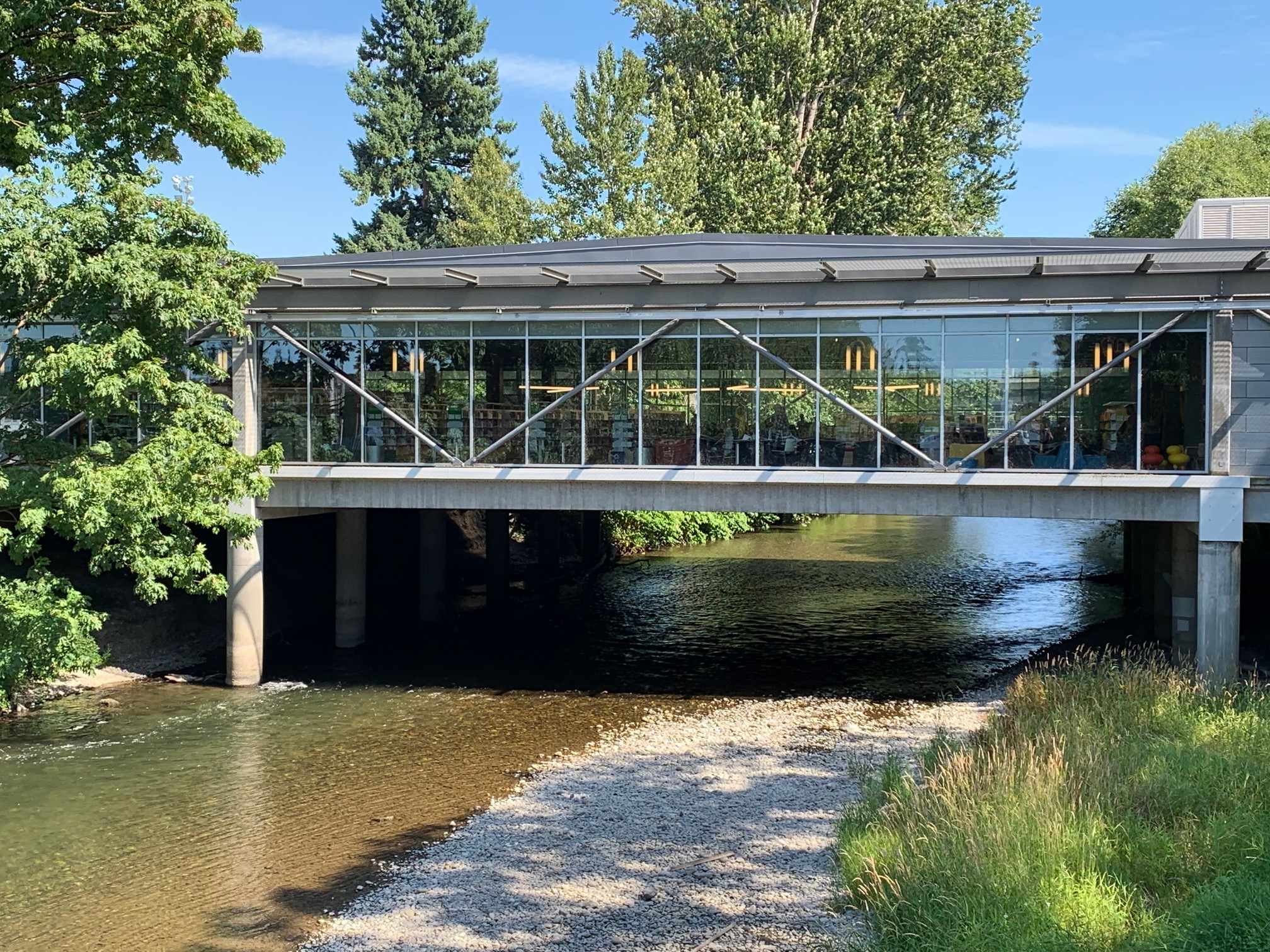
- Renton Library spanning the Cedar River as it appeared in July 2019
- Interactive map of the Renton Public Library area
- Alternative names: Cedar River Library, Renton Main Library

General information
- Location: 100 Mill Avenue South, Renton, Washington, United States
- Coordinates: 47.482°N 122.202°W
- Opened: April 17, 1966
- Renovated: 2014–2015
- Cost: $327,560
- Client: City of Renton
- Owner: King County Library System

Technical details
- Floor area: 19,500 sq ft (1,810 m^{2})

Design and construction
- Architecture firm: Felix M. Campanella and David Arthur Johnston; Johnston-Campanella & Company
- Main contractor: Alton V. Phillips and Company

Renovating team
- Architect: Miller Hull Partnership
- Engineer: Talasea Consultants, Inc. (enviro.)
- Structural engineer: Coughlin Porter Lundeen
- Services engineer: PAE Consulting Engineers (mech./plumbing)
- Other designers: Christa Jansen (B&H Architects) (int.)
- Main contractor: Construction Enterprises & Contractors
- Awards: AIA/ALA Library Building Award (2016); AIA Seattle Civic Design Honor Award (2017)
- 1966 data via HistoryLink; 2015 renovation data via Chicago Athenaeum and from Daily Journal of Commerce

The Renton Public Library is the King County Library System (KCLS) branch library in Renton, Washington, in the United States. It was a city library between its construction in 1966 and 2010, when it was one of the last three non-KCLS members in the county outside of Seattle and it was incorporated into KCLS after what may have been "the most contentious annexation fight in the system's 71 years".

== Design and construction ==
The library sits astride a river – the Cedar River – one of the only libraries in the United States to do so.

The building is about 80 feet (24 m) long, spanning the river on a bridge-like precast concrete girder and tie system riding on pilings.

=== Renovation ===
The library was closed June 22, 2014 for a $10.2 million renovation, to include new pilings into the banks of the Cedar River for seismic retrofitting, and replacement of wall-mounted windows with floor-to-ceiling glass for better river views and natural light. After renovation the library reopened in August, 2015.

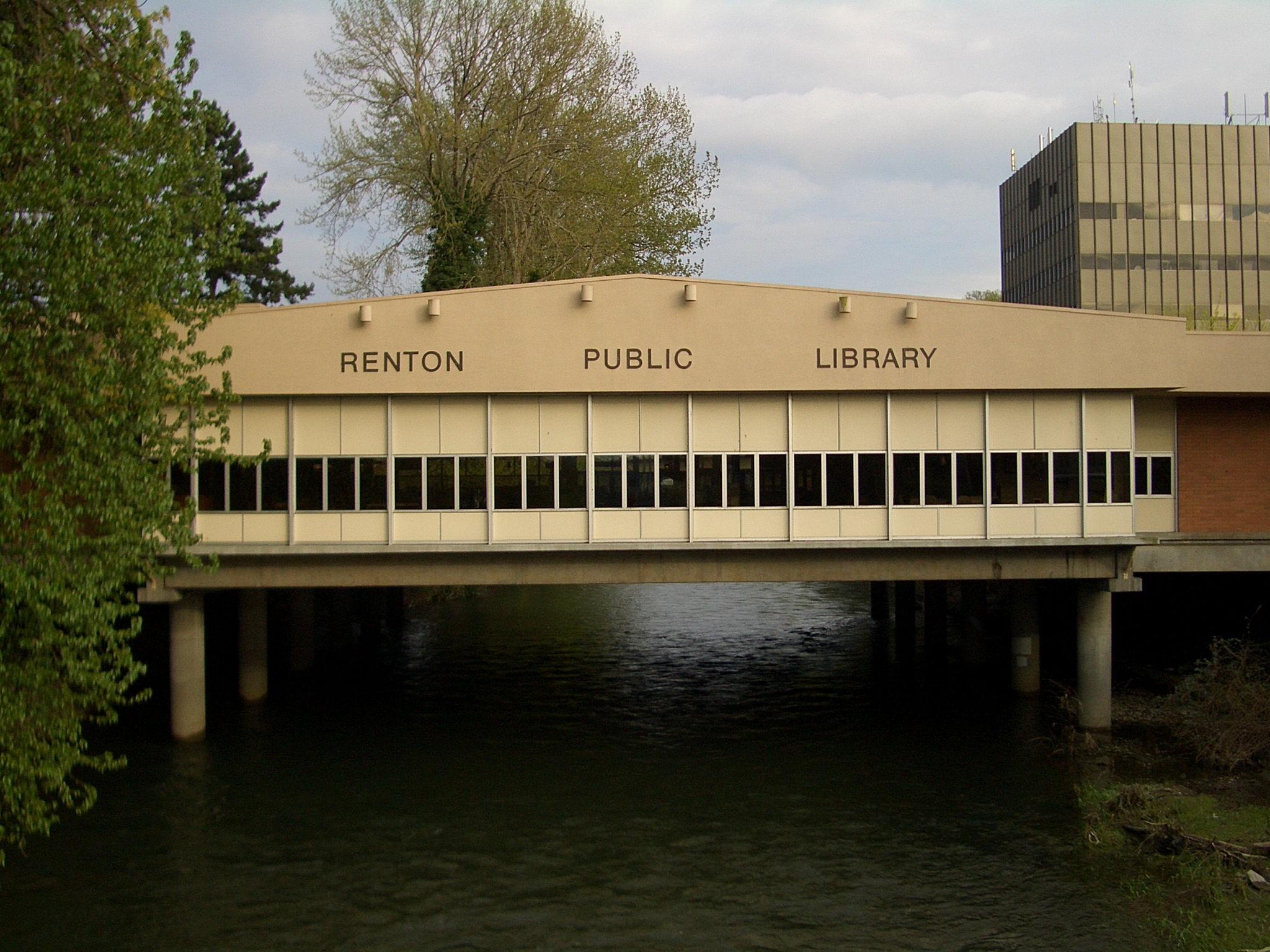
The library before renovation

For the renovation, Miller Hull Partnership architects were awarded AIA/ALA Library Building Award in 2016, then in 2017 won the American Institute of Architects Seattle chapter's Civic Design Honor Award for its rehabilitation.

== Salmon viewing ==
The library's location over the Cedar River is considered a prime location to view spawning Northwest salmon species including Sockeye, Coho and Chinook.
