= History of Seattle 1900–1940 =

History of Seattle, Washington 1900–1940: Seattle experienced rapid growth and transformation in the early 20th century, establishing itself as a leader in the Pacific Northwest. The Klondike Gold Rush led to massive immigration, diversifying the city's ethnic mix with arrivals of Japanese, Filipinos, Europeans, and European-Americans. The city expanded geographically through annexations and ambitious regrade projects, most notably the Denny Regrade which leveled more than 120 feet of Denny Hill. Major infrastructure projects shaped the city, including the construction of the Lake Washington Ship Canal and the development of an extensive park system designed by the Olmsted Brothers. The Alaska-Yukon-Pacific Exposition of 1909 celebrated the city's rise, while the completion of Smith Tower in 1914 gave Seattle the tallest building west of the Mississippi River.

The interwar period brought significant challenges to Seattle. World War I initially boomed the economy, particularly in shipbuilding and lumber, but the city faced a sharp downturn when the war ended. The Seattle General Strike of 1919 marked a period of labor unrest, and the city was hit hard by the Great Depression. Despite economic difficulties, Seattle developed as an arts center during this time. The Frye Art Museum and Henry Art Gallery were established, and artists like Mark Tobey and Morris Graves gained national recognition. The Prohibition era saw a thriving speakeasy scene, and by mid-century, Seattle's Jackson Street jazz scene would launch the careers of musicians including Ray Charles and Quincy Jones. Despite the challenges, the city maintained its character, with affordable housing and extensive parks making it an attractive place to live for those who remained employed.

== Leader of the Northwest: 1900 to 1915 ==
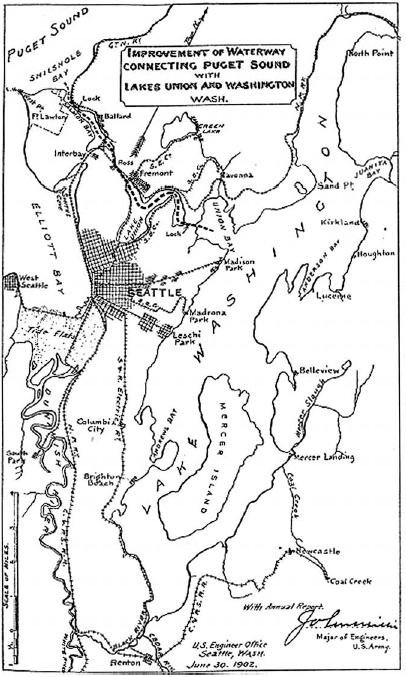
June 1902 map proposing the Lake Washington Ship Canal shows streets and railways from that time.

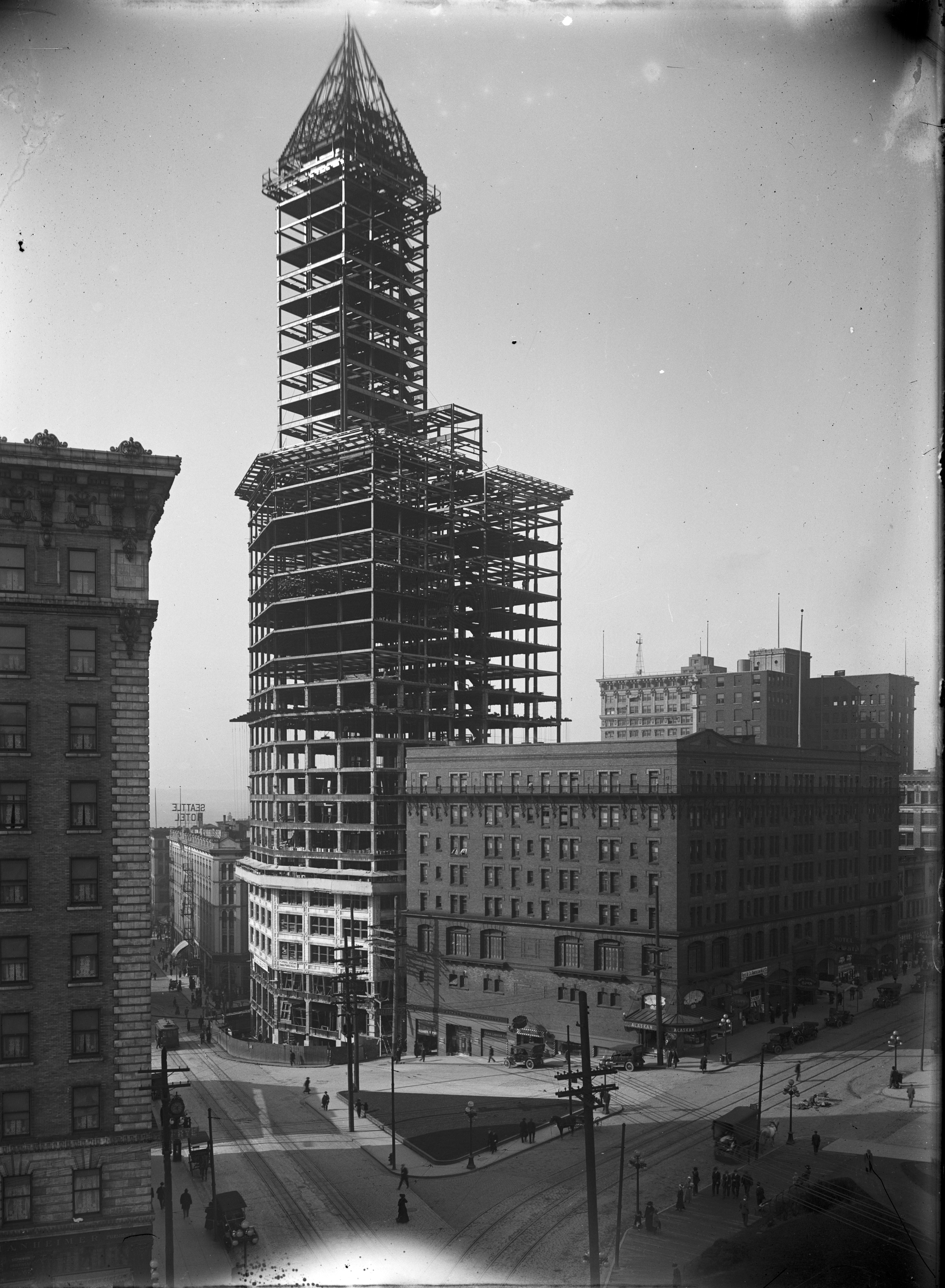
Smith Tower construction, February 1913

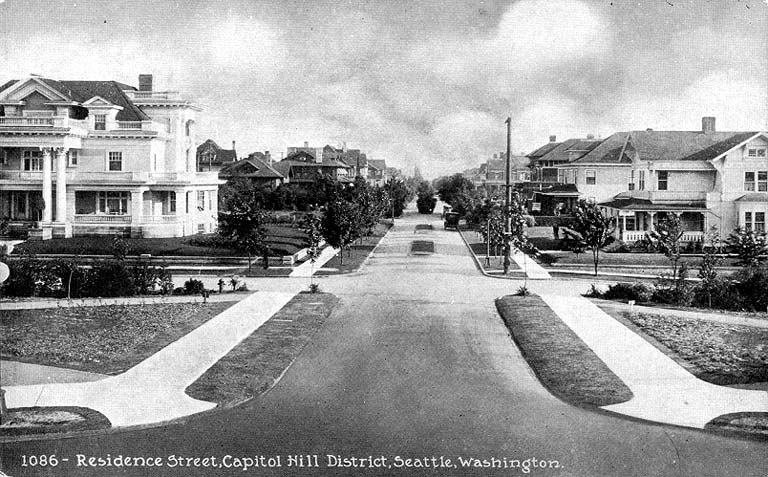
Capitol Hill c. 1917

The gold rush (see History of Seattle before 1900) led to massive immigration, with major arrivals of Japanese, Filipinos, immigrant Europeans, and European-Americans from back east. The arrival of Greeks and Sephardic Jews broadened the city's ethnic mix.

Many of Seattle's neighborhoods got their start around this time. At first, the city grew mainly along the water to the north and south of downtown to avoid steep grades. However, the new rich soon developed the land on First Hill that overlooks downtown "because it was close to downtown without being a part of it, and because it occupied a commanding position."

Downtown Seattle was bustling with activity; as quickly as previous inhabitants moved out to newly created neighborhoods, new immigrants came in to take their place in the city core. There was an enormous apartment boom in the years after 1905. A 1905 city directory lists only 19 apartment buildings. The 1911 directory has twelve columns of such listings.

The last great manhunt of the Wild West was the search for Harry Tracy in Seattle in 1902.

In 1908, the Great White Fleet visited Seattle and the US West Coast, "to demonstrate to the world America's naval prowess.

Construction on the Smith Tower was completed in 1914. It was the tallest building west of the Mississippi River from its completion in 1914 until the Space Needle overtook it in 1962. It remained the tallest office building west of the Mississippi River until the Humble Building (now Exxon Building) was built in 1963.

Following the vision of city engineer R.H. Thomson, who had already played a key role in the development of municipal utilities, a massive effort was made to level the extreme hills that rose south and north of the bustling city. From 1900 to 1914 the Denny Regrade to the north and the Jackson Regrade to the south leveled more than 120 feet (37 m) of Denny Hill and parts of First and Beacon Hills. The Denny Regrade continued in spurts until 1930. Dirt from the Jackson Regrade filled in the swampy tidelands that are now occupied by the SoDo neighborhood as well as Safeco Field and Qwest Field. A seawall containing dirt from the Denny Regrade created the current waterfront. More dirt from the Denny Regrade went to build the industrial Harbor Island at the mouth of the Duwamish River, south of Downtown.

The Denny Regrade wasn't the only radical reshaping of Seattle's topography in this period. The 1911–1917 construction of the Lake Washington Ship Canal included two major "cuts" (the Montlake Cut and the Fremont Cut, four bascule bridges, and the Government Locks (now Hiram M. Chittenden Locks). The level of Lake Washington dropped; the Black River, which formerly ran out of the south end of the lake, dried up completely, and Seward Island became the Seward Peninsula, now the site of Seward Park.

After the obvious geographical expansion from downtown, "other neighborhoods… [came]… into existence… [as]… the result of streetcar lines moving north and east from downtown and providing opportunities for settling that were obviously attractive to all but the poorest." Several lines, running to most of central Seattle's modern neighborhoods, created the communities of Capitol Hill, Queen Anne, Madrona, Madison Park, and Leschi. All of the expansion was happening without zoning, leading to "different land uses and economic classes everywhere [being] mixed."

Seattle also grew by annexation in this period, annexing areas including the previously separately incorporated Columbia City, Ballard, South Park, and West Seattle in 1907 and Georgetown in 1910.

At the same time as the city was expanding dramatically, the city planners began to put in parks. "Four million dollars worth of bonds were sold between 1905 and 1912 to develop the parks and build the boulevards designed by the Olmsteds to connect them." Almost all of Seattle's large parks were constructed during this period: Woodland Park (which includes the Woodland Park Zoo), Volunteer Park, Green Lake, Washington Park (now the site of the University of Washington Arboretum), Ravenna Park, Leschi Park, Seward Park. The Olmsted plan for boulevards was carried out nearly in full. The form of the plan was "a winding parkway of about 20 miles (32 km) which would link most of the existing and planned parks and greenbelts within the city limits." Then, as now, no main park or particular area of Seattle that stood out above the rest. Much of the ambiance of Seattle derives from the fact that whole of the city (with the notable exception of the industrial area in the center of the city, south of downtown, and extending to South Park and Boeing Field; and to a lesser extent, downtown itself) is filled with small parks, hills, and lakes.

Where there had so recently been wilderness, increasingly there was the reality of a major city. The Seattle Symphony was founded in 1903, and while few, if any, other comparably important arts institutions were established, the story was different in more popular entertainments. Vaudeville impresarios Alexander Pantages, John Considine, and John Cort (the last also involved in legitimate theater) were all based in Seattle in this era.

Seattle trumpeted and celebrated its rise with the Alaska-Yukon-Pacific Exposition of 1909, but the city's rapid growth had led to much questioning of the social order. Not only the labor left, but also progressives calling for "good government" challenged the hegemony of the captains of industry. Rail baron James J. Hill, addressing Seattle business leaders in 1909, noted and regretted the change. "Where," he asked, "are the man who used to match your mountains…?"

== World War I and the Bogue Plan: 1914–1920 ==
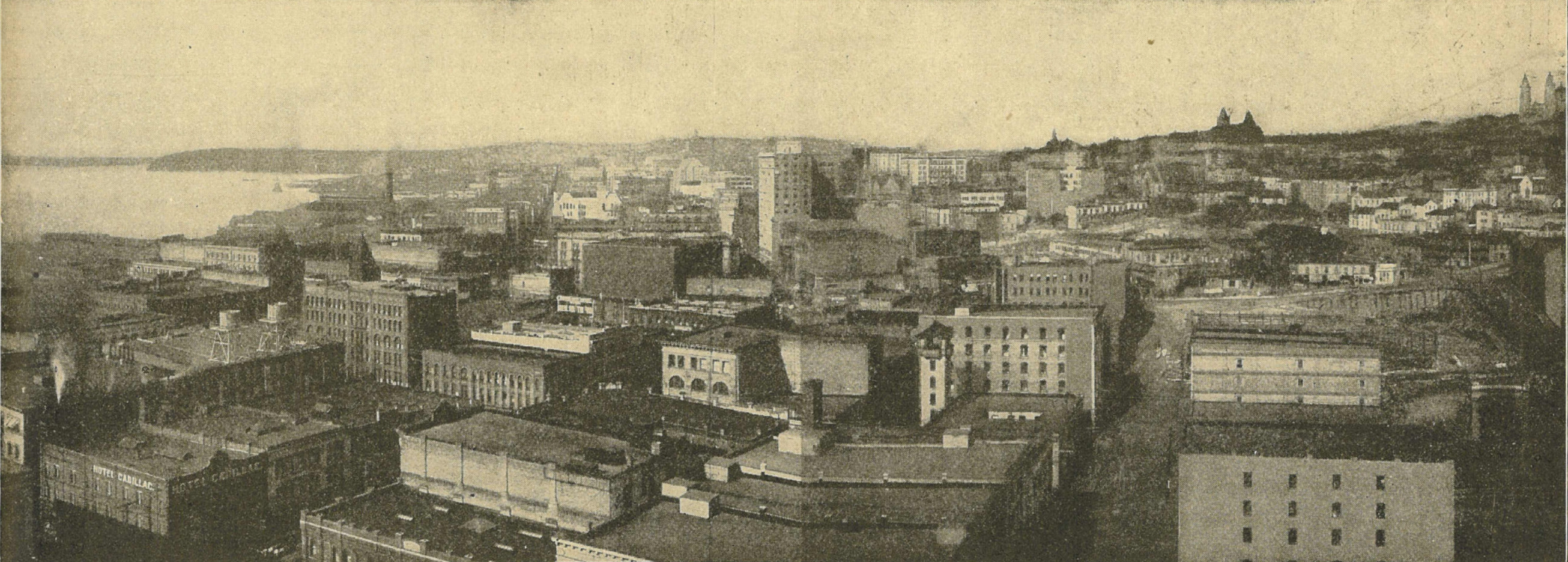
Seattle circa 1910 from the tower of King Street Station, during the brief reign of the Alaska Building as the city's tallest building.

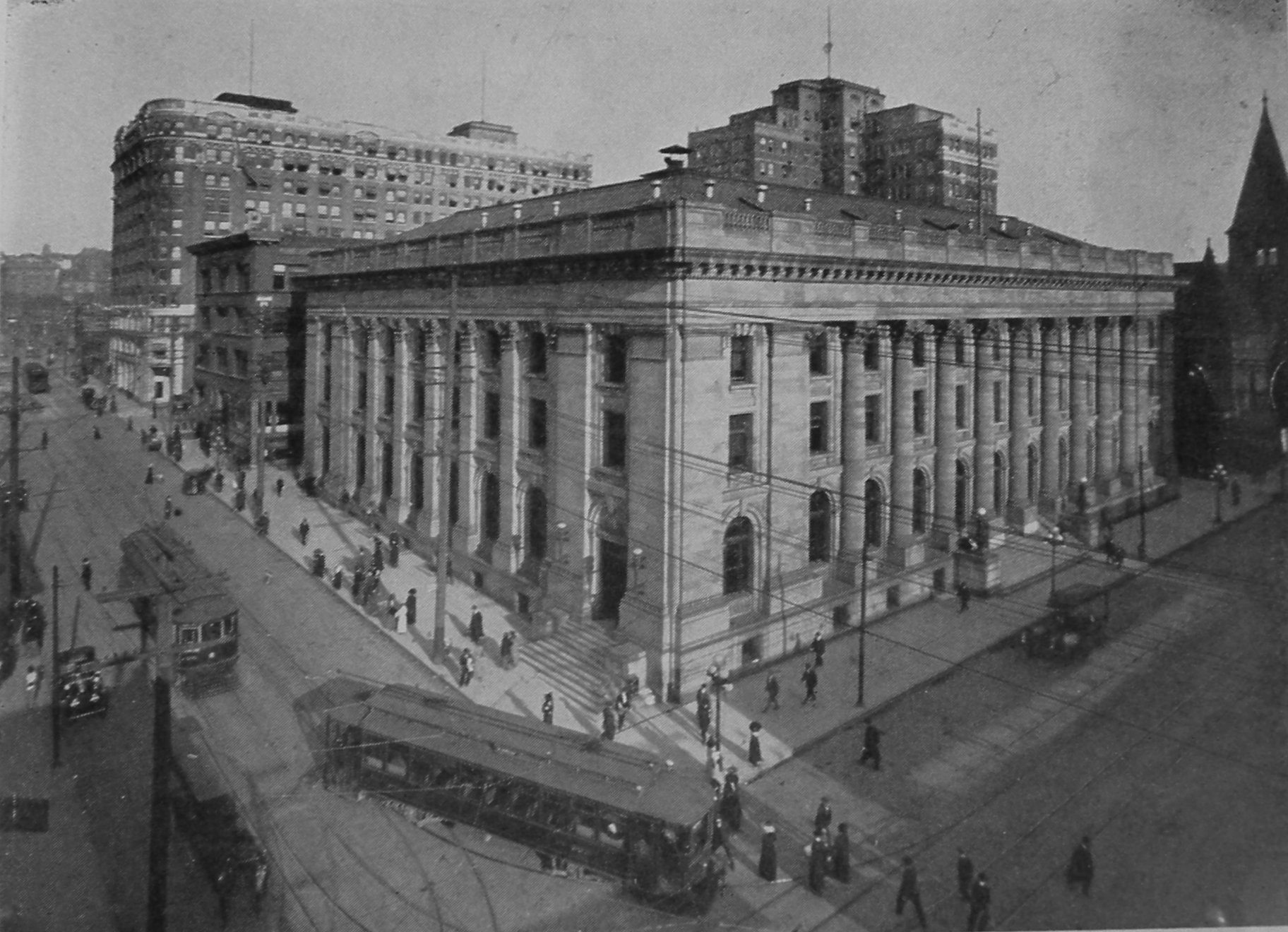
Seattle's old downtown post office, 1914

In 1910, Seattle voters approved a referendum to create a development plan for the whole city. However, the result, known as the Bogue plan, was never to be implemented.

Virgil Bogue had worked for Olmsted and was intimately familiar with the land in Seattle. The Bogue plan had at its heart a grand civic center in Belltown and the Denny Regrade connected to the rest of the city by a rapid transit rail system, with a huge expansion of the park system, crowned by the total conversion of 4,000-acre (16 km^{2}) Mercer Island into parkland. Striking in Bogue's plan is his grasp of the consequences of growth; he foresaw that the city's residents would eventually number in the millions and that such a grand park or efficient transit system could put in place early in the development at much lower cost.

However, the Bogue plan was defeated by an alliance of fiscal conservatives who opposed such a grandiose plan on general principles and populists who argued that the plan would mainly benefit the rich: for example, the proposed massive Mercer Island park could, at that time, only be reached by boat. The Bogue plan sat on the shelf, never to be used. Ultimately, a few of the sites proposed for public parks were developed as such; more became private golf courses and such. The rail system was never built, and Mercer Island is now an upper middle class suburb, connected to the city by an Interstate Highway floating bridge.

At the same time as the government stopped investing for the future, private enterprise also began to stiffen. The war hid this, because it "boomed and expanded Seattle's economy phenomenally, but in false ways." The growth in the size of the economy was unprecedented, increasing nearly tenfold. However, it was almost all in wartime shipbuilding and lumber, and there was very little growth in new industries.

== Seattle between the Wars ==
When the war ended, so did Seattle's prosperity. Economic output crashed as the government stopped buying boats, and there were no new industries to pick up the slack. Seattle stopped being a place of explosive growth and opportunity. Western Washington was a center of radical labor agitation. Most dramatically, a general strike occurred in 1919. The Industrial Workers of the World played a prominent role in the strike. After surviving the general strike, Seattle mayor Ole Hanson became a prominent figure in the First Red Scare, and made an unsuccessful attempt to ride that backlash to the White House in an unsuccessful bid for the Republican nomination for the presidential election of 1920.

Things picked up in the late 1920s, but then came the Great Depression. Times were rough all over the country, but Seattle was hit particularly hard because the manufacturing industries had been crowded out by the war. For example, Seattle issued 2,538 permits for housing construction in 1930, but only 361 in 1932.

Seattle saw some of the country's harshest labor strife of the Depression. During the Maritime Strike of 1934, striking longshoremen faced off with police and strikebreakers in a series of daily skirmishes that became known as "The Battle of Smith Cove". As a result of the violence of the strike, Seattle lost much of its maritime traffic to the Port of Los Angeles. This was followed by the temporary ascendancy of the New Order of Cincinnatus, a "conservative and moralistic reform group" that challenged both the Democratic and Republican parties, and was widely accused of "fascist" or "proto-fascist" tendencies.

Despite this, and despite enormous police corruption, Roger Sale argues that the Seattle between the wars was a pretty nice place to live, especially to grow up in. The city was still full of single-family wood houses and parks from the Olmstead development, but because of the crash they were affordable—at least to those who still had jobs. Seattle between the wars, writes Sale "is what suburbs try to be, but never achieve because they cannot stand things so jammed together, all for a family whose income could be well under two thousand dollars a year." Seattle settled down into a kind of stasis between the wars, as growth subsided while those who lived in the city stayed.

Although no longer the economic powerhouse it had been around the start of the 20th century, it was in the 1920s that Seattle first began seriously to be an arts center. The Frye and Henry families put on public display the collections that would become the core of the Frye Art Museum and Henry Art Gallery, respectively. Nellie Cornish had established the Cornish School (now Cornish College of the Arts) in 1914. Australian painter Ambrose Patterson arrived in 1919; over the next few decades Mark Tobey, Morris Graves, Kenneth Callahan, Guy Irving Anderson, and Paul Horiuchi would establish themselves as nationally and internationally known artists. Bandleader Vic Meyers and others kept the speakeasies jumping through the Prohibition era, and by mid-century the thriving jazz scene in the city's Skid Road district would launch the careers of musicians including Ray Charles and Quincy Jones.

== See also ==
- Timeline of Seattle, 1900s-1940s
