= Chester Morse Lake =

Lake in Washington, United States

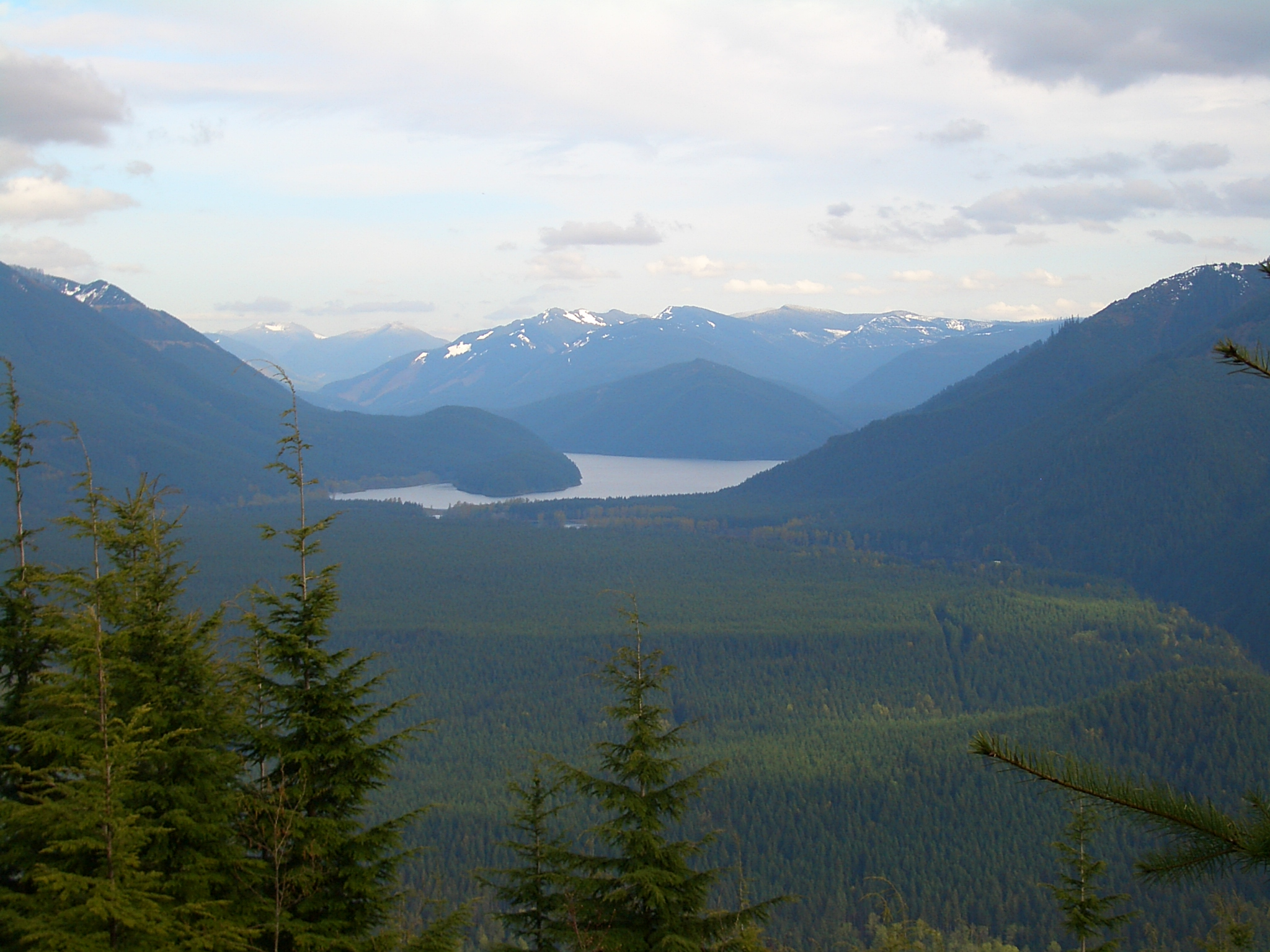
- seen from Rattlesnake Mountain

- Location within Washington (state) Location within the United States
- Location: King County, Washington
- Coordinates: 47°23′13″N 121°42′01″W
- Primary inflows: North Fork of the Cedar River, South Fork of the Cedar River, and the Rex River
- Primary outflows: Cedar River
- Basin countries: United States
- Surface elevation: 1,560 ft (480 m)

Chester Morse Lake (originally Cedar Lake) is a lake in the upper region of the Cedar River watershed in the U.S. state of Washington. The original lake surface was 1,530 feet (466 m) above sea level, but when the river was dammed in 1900, the elevation was raised to 1,560 feet (475 m). Chester Morse Lake is more than four miles (6 km) long, and is primarily fed from the east by the north and south forks of the Cedar River, and from the south by the Rex River. The lake is part of the Seattle area water supply.

Located in the upper watershed, Chester Morse Lake is impounded by the masonry dam and a secondary control structure called the Overflow Dike. The lake now functions as a water supply storage reservoir and powers a 30-megawatt hydroelectric facility.

Chester Morse Lake was previously a natural lake called Cedar Lake. Cedar Lake was formed about 14,000 years ago by the terminal moraine of an alpine glacier descending the Cedar River valley from the upper elevations of the Cascade Mountains.

Because upstream fish passage to Chester Morse Lake is naturally blocked by Cedar Falls, the fish populations in the lake are isolated from those downstream. Bull trout and pygmy whitefish populations in Chester Morse Lake have thus been separated from other populations for at least 13,000 years, and represent unique genetic stocks of these species.

Both of these species spend most of their time in deeper portions of the lake.

The surface of Chester Morse Lake has an average annual fluctuation of about 20 feet in elevation. Inundation of the Cedar and Rex river deltas strongly affects their aquatic and wetland habitats.

Changes in lake level management toward higher lake levels in the past 15 years have resulted in a retreat upslope of sedge and willow communities on the delta. Inundation of the Cedar and Rex river channels within and upstream of the delta causes sedimentation that can negatively affect bull trout eggs. Studies are underway to examine these effects.

== Smaller lakes ==
Smaller lakes in the Cedar River Watershed above Cedar Falls are all subalpine and occur in cirques, which are basins at the head of valleys carved by alpine glaciers.

None of these lakes have fish populations but all support numerous amphibian populations, including Cascades frog, Pacific tree frog, and northwestern salamanders.

== Findley Lake ==
Findley Lake and its watershed have been the site of extensive scientific research since its establishment as a study site under the International Biological Program in the early 1970s. Research has tapered off in recent years.

== Walsh Lake ==
Walsh Lake, 68 acres in area, is the largest lake in the lower watershed. With 11 documented species, it has the greatest diversity of fish species of all lakes in the watershed. A population of kokanee (a landlocked form of sockeye salmon) lives in Walsh Lake and spawns in its major tributary, Webster Creek. Researchers at the University of Washington have claimed that Walsh Lake is among the least disturbed low elevation lakes in the Puget Sound region.

== 14 Lakes ==
14 Lakes are a set of five ponds ranging in size from 0.4 to 3.6 acres. (They are named for their location in Section 14 within the township/range system.)

These lakes are located in depressions and are probably kettle lakes created during the retreat of large glaciers that once covered Puget Sound during the Pleistocene. Kettles are formed by large, stranded pieces of glacial ice that become buried by glacial outwash sediments and after melting, leave behind a depression.

None of these lakes have perennial inflowing streams or outlets. The water levels of 14 Lakes fluctuate seasonally and inter-annually based on the amount of precipitation and rates of groundwater inflow and outflow. Because shrubs and trees can't persist with the periodic flooding, the fluctuating water levels maintain a very diverse herbaceous-dominated shoreline with most plant species adapted to periodic flooding. (See botanical inventory of 14 Lakes (pdf))

Due to the rarity of lake-pond habitat in the watershed and surrounding landscape, 14 Lakes are an important aquatic habitat in the region, particularly for amphibian populations. These ponds are an important refuge for amphibian populations in this area because 14 Lakes do not have fish or non-native bull frogs (which prey on amphibian eggs and larvae and can eliminate native amphibians from lakes and ponds).
