= Interurban Trail (King County) =

Rail trail in Washington, United States

Coordinates: 47°27′49″N 122°14′41″W

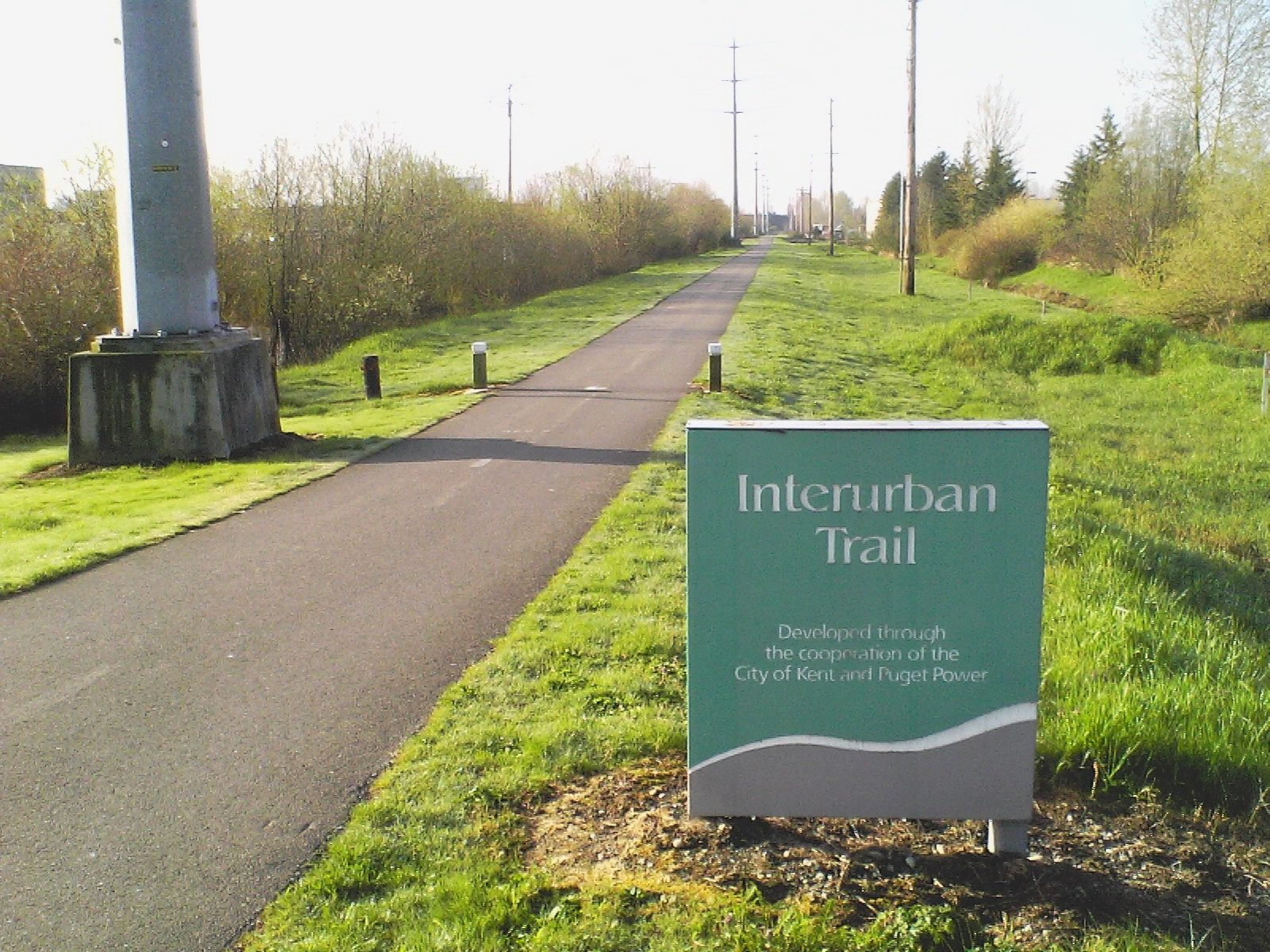
- The Interurban Trail and sign
- Length: 14 miles (23 km), South Trail
- Location: King and Pierce counties
- Use: Non-motorized, bicycle
- Surface: Paved

Trail map
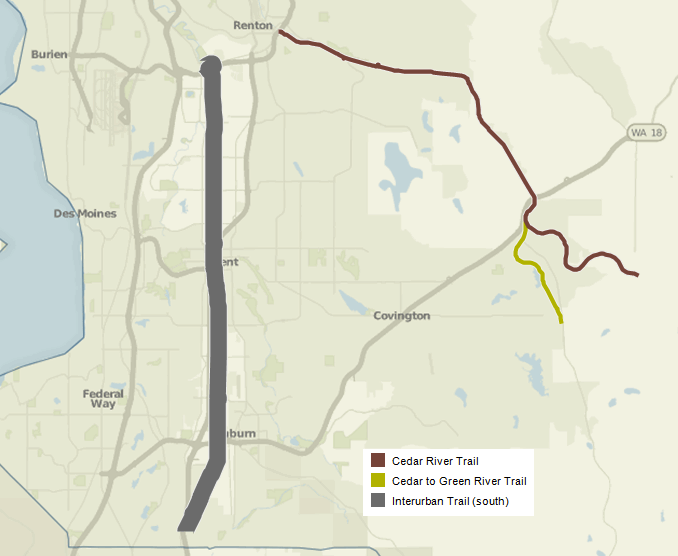
- Interurban Trail (south) route map

The Interurban Trail are a pair of trails in Washington. The interurban Trail North is a bicycle route running from Downtown Seattle through Shoreline and to the Snohomish County, Washington line. The Interurban Trail South is a rail trail in King and Pierce counties.

== Interurban Trail North ==
The Interurban Trail North begins as a signed bicycle route in downtown Seattle running through the Fremont neighborhood, through Phinney Ridge and Greenwood, to 110th and Fremont where it becomes a paved rail trail until 128th and Linden where it will become a cycletrack to the City of Shoreline border. At the City of Shoreline the route becomes a wide non-motorized route for 3 miles until the Snohomish County line.

== Interurban Trail South ==
The Interurban Trail South is a partially paved 14-mile (23 km) recreational trail open for non-motorized use. It connects from Tukwila to Pacific, and the cities of Kent, Auburn, and Algona along the way. As of 2023, the cities of Edgewood, Milton, and Fife completed and opened paved segments of the Interurban trail but are not yet connected to the main segment from Tukwila to Pacific. When the construction is completed to close the gaps in Edgewood, and Milton, the trail will extend from Tukwila to Fife. Additionally, the segment in the City of Fife will connect to the "spuyaləpabš Trail" (the Lushootseed name for the Puyallup people) currently under development by WSDOT that will connect from Tacoma to Puyallup.

The trail occupies an abandoned Puget Sound Electric Railway corridor and connects to the Green River Trail.

In addition to the main line of the Interurban trail between Tukwila and Fife, the Interurban Trail South will connect to the planned northerly extension of the Foothills Trail through Puyallup and Sumner. When that connection is completed, a continuous trail will extend south through Pacific, across the county line into Sumner and Puyallup where it will connect with the existing Pierce County Foothills Trail to South Prairie and the planned extension of the Foothills trail to Buckley and Enumclaw.
