= Puget Sound Electric Railway =

Former interurban railway between Seattle and Tacoma, Washington

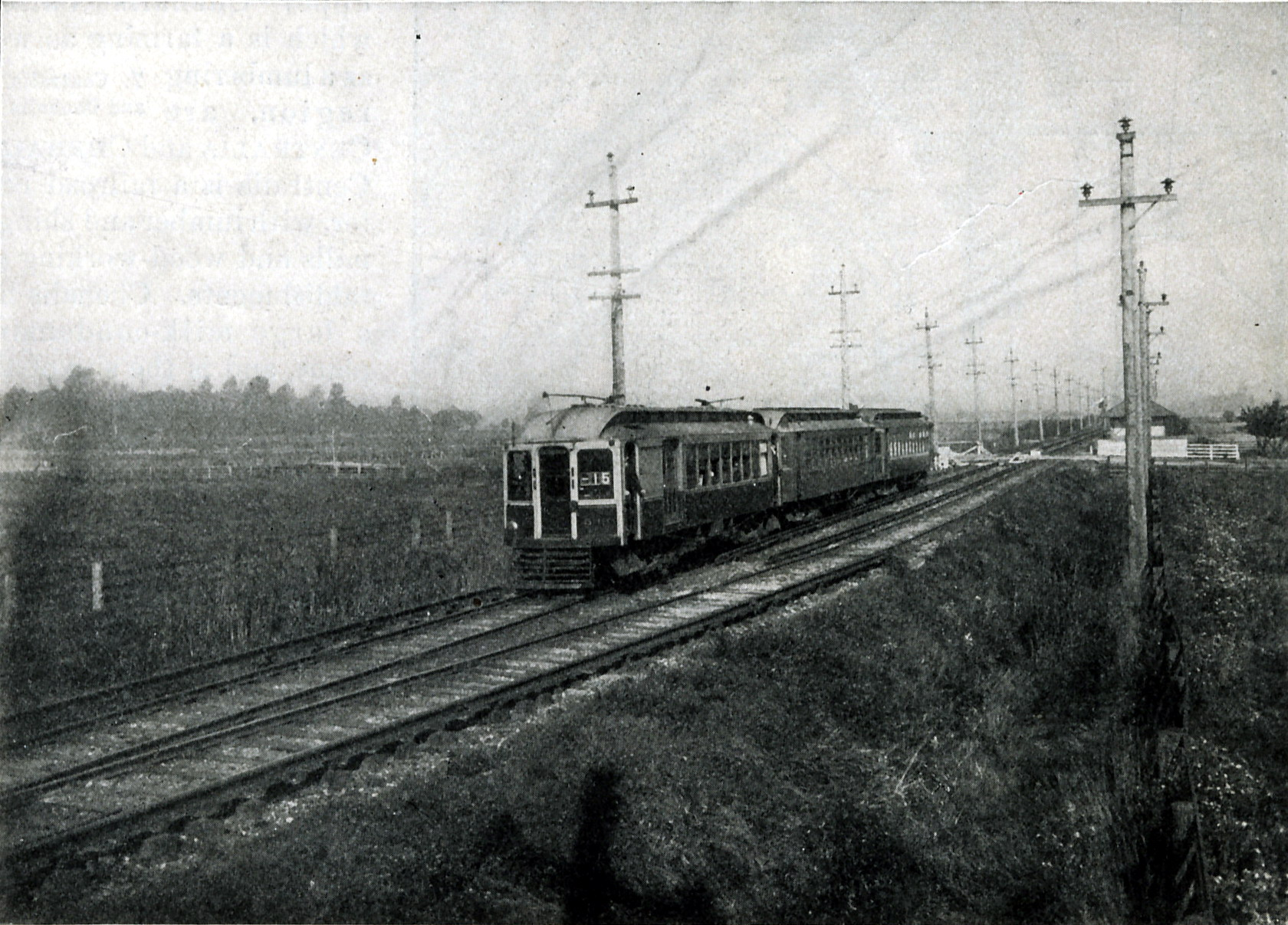
- A train between Seattle and Tacoma c. 1914

Overview
- Locale: Seattle–Tacoma, Washington
- Termini: Seattle; Tacoma
- Stations: 18

Service
- Type: Interurban
- Services: 1

History
- Opened: 1902
- Closed: 1928

Technical
- Line length: 38 mi (61 km)

The Puget Sound Electric Railway was an interurban railway that ran for 38 miles (61 km) between Tacoma and Seattle, Washington in the first quarter of the 20th century. The railway's reporting mark was "PSE".

Portions of the right-of-way still exist as the multi-use Interurban Trail through Fife, Milton, Edgewood, as well as from Pacific to Tukwila, Washington.

== History ==
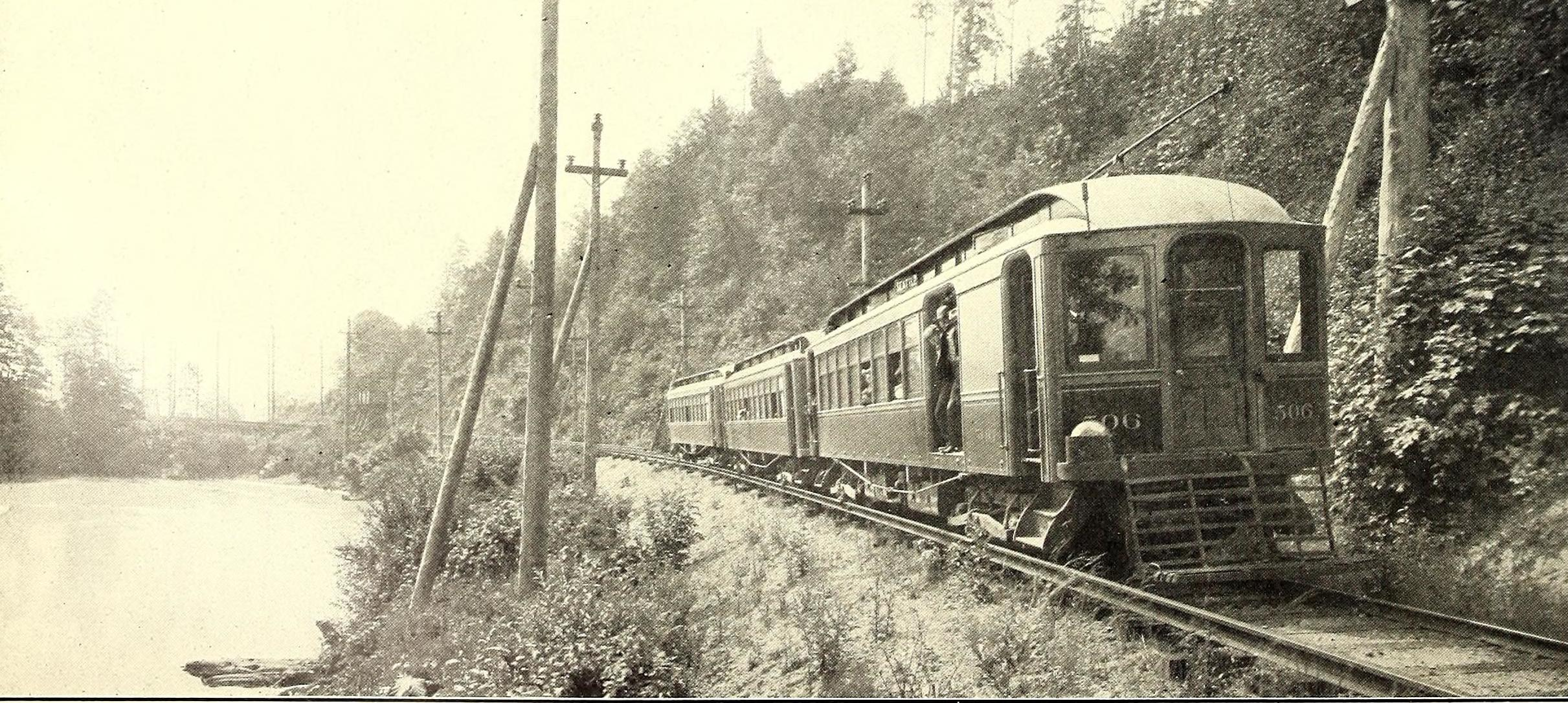
Puget Sound Electric Railway, the Interurban Line near Tacoma

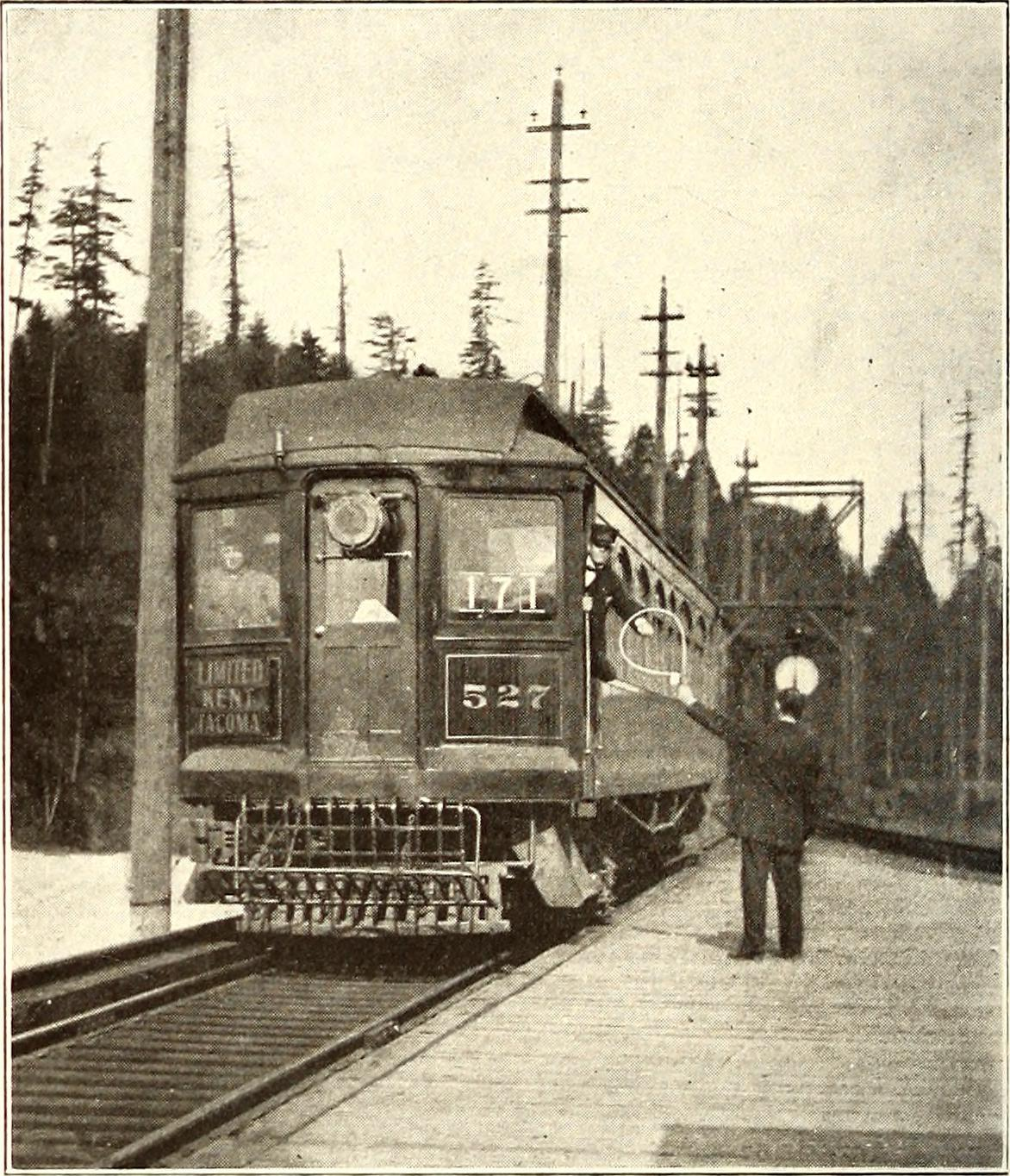
Hoops were used to deliver orders to passing trains

The PSE began operations on September 25, 1902 with a line that started in downtown Tacoma, ran along Pacific and Puyallup Avenues, followed the course of present-day Pacific Highway through Fife and to Milton, turned southeast towards Puyallup and paralleled the path of today's SR 167 through Pacific, Algona, Auburn, Kent, Orillia and Renton, then into Seattle on its own dedicated right-of-way, via South Park, from there running on surface streets to the area near Pioneer Square. There it terminated at Occidental Way and Yesler Way in front of the Interurban Building, then known as the Pacific Block when the depot was located in the building's corner room from 1902 to 1928. From there it interchanged with other interurbans and street car lines in the area. At its peak the line saw 27 daily departures and arrivals split between the Tacoma and Renton branches with trains running from 07:00 to 24:00.

Power was supplied via overhead wire in urban areas, and third rail in rural areas. The third rail was the cause of several accidents throughout the PSE's operations which involved livestock or people being electrocuted, and in some cases dead cows caused accidents involving the trolleys themselves.

The railroad ran for 26 years, until competition from trucks, buses, and automobiles on an ever-expanding road network, as well as the steam railroads, led to reduced ridership in the early 1920s and a decision to shut down operations was made by the operators. Despite protests, the interurban was allowed to suspend operations by a federal judge in a ruling made on October 13, 1928. The final trains ran on December 30, 1928. The rails were not pulled up until 1930.

The financial and competitive challenges that ultimately led the railroad to cease operation came from a variety of factors: not only the increasing availability of cars, but also the existence of ferry services, bus services, and streetcar services along its route. Its fares were also constrained by the regulations of the Railroad Commission of Washington, which explicitly sought to limit its profits.

It was headquartered in Kent, Washington.

== Stations ==
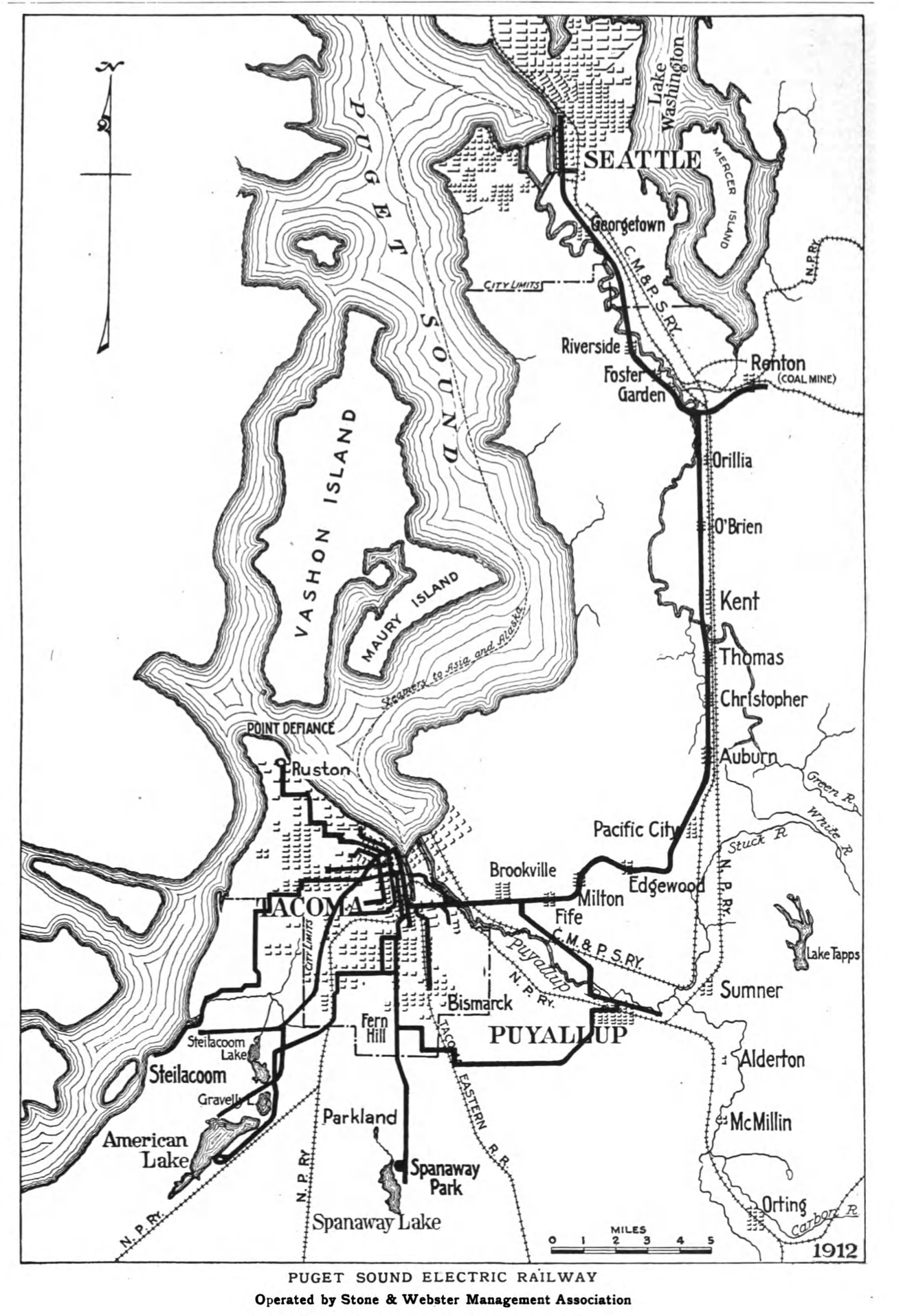
Map of Puget Sound Electric Railway c. 1912

As of 1910.

- Seattle (Yesler Way and Occidental Avenue)
- Georgetown
- Duwamish
- Riverton
- Foster
- Tukwila
- Renton Junction
- Renton
- Orillia
- O'Brien
- Kent
- Thomas
- Cristopher
- Auburn
- Algona
- Pacific City
- Edgewood
- Milton
- Tacoma (South Eighth Street & A Street)

== Second life ==
Portions of the PSE exist today as the multi-use Interurban Trail in Fife, Milton, Edgewood, Pacific, Algona, Auburn, Kent, and Tukwila. It links Pierce County and King County although there are a few remaining gaps in the trail (in Milton, Edgewood, and Sumner) as of 2024. The gap in Sumner (not originally part of the PSE railway, but part of the modern day Interurban Trail) has been designed and funded and is slated for construction in 2025. The gaps in the cities of Milton and Edgewood are currently in the design stage, with construction slated to begin in 2026 pending funding.

== See also ==
- Yakima Valley Transportation Company
- Spokane and Inland Empire Railroad
