= Mount Ruth (Washington) =

Mountain in Washington, United States

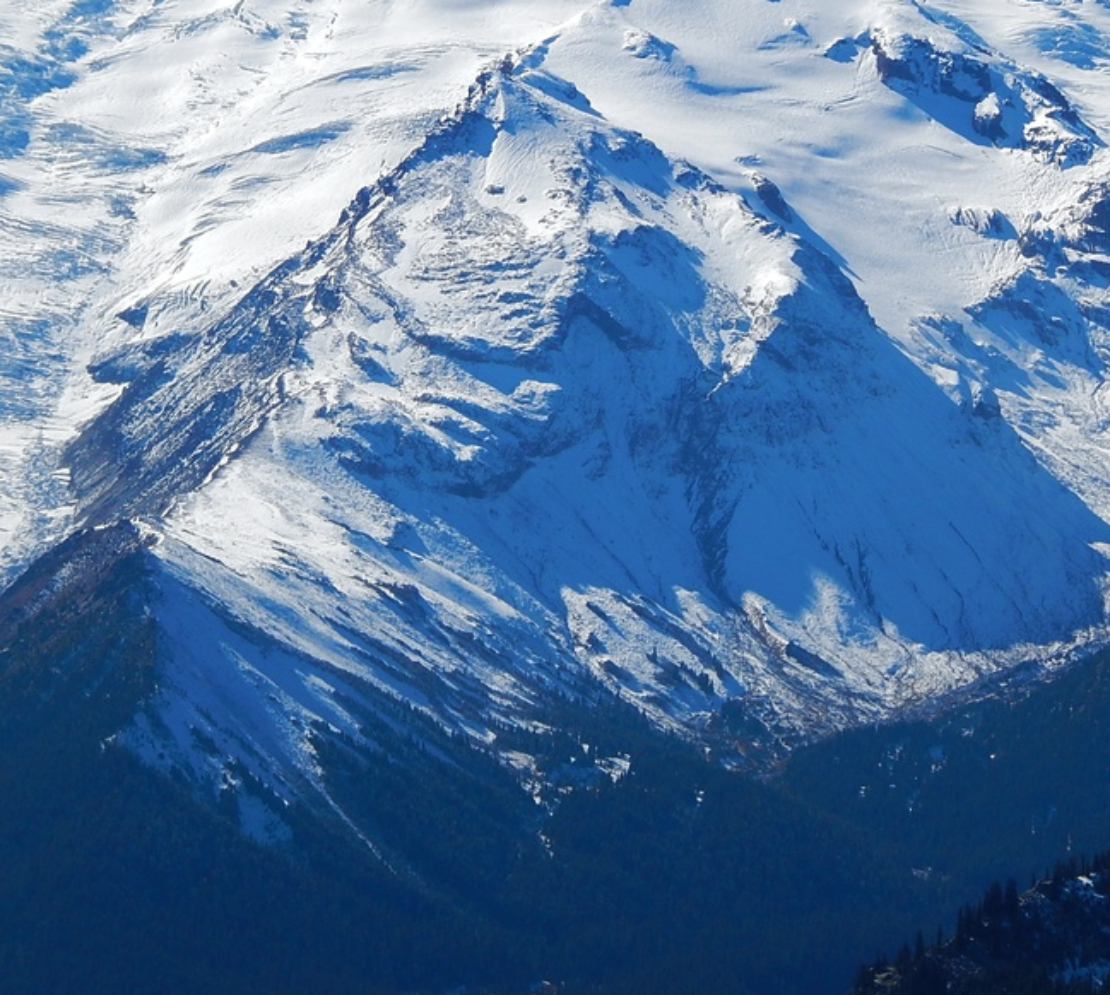
- Mount Ruth seen from Sourdough Ridge

Highest point
- Elevation: 8,690 ft (2,649 m)
- Prominence: 50 ft (15 m)
- Coordinates: 46°52′35″N 121°43′02″W

Geography
- Location within Washington (state) Location within the United States
- Country: United States
- State: Washington
- County: Pierce
- Protected area: Mount Rainier National Park
- Parent range: Cascades
- Topo map: USGS Sunrise

Climbing
- Easiest route: Scrambling class 3

Mount Ruth is an 8,690-foot summit located within Mount Rainier National Park in Pierce County of Washington state. Part of the Cascade Range, Mount Ruth is situated between the Emmons Glacier and the Inter Glacier. Access is via the Glacier Basin Trail. The name of the peak honors Ruth Knapp, daughter of the prospector who built Knapp's Cabin in Glacier Basin below the peak. Precipitation runoff from Mount Ruth drains into the White River.

== Climate ==
Mount Ruth is located in the marine west coast climate zone of western North America. Most weather fronts originating in the Pacific Ocean travel northeast toward the Cascade Mountains. As fronts approach, they are forced upward by the peaks of the Cascade Range (orographic lift), causing them to drop their moisture in the form of rain or snow onto the Cascades. As a result, the west side of the Cascades experiences high precipitation, especially during the winter months in the form of snowfall. Because of maritime influence, snow tends to be wet and heavy, resulting in high avalanche danger. During winter months, weather is usually cloudy, but due to high pressure systems over the Pacific Ocean that intensify during summer months, there is often little or no cloud cover during the summer.

== Gallery ==
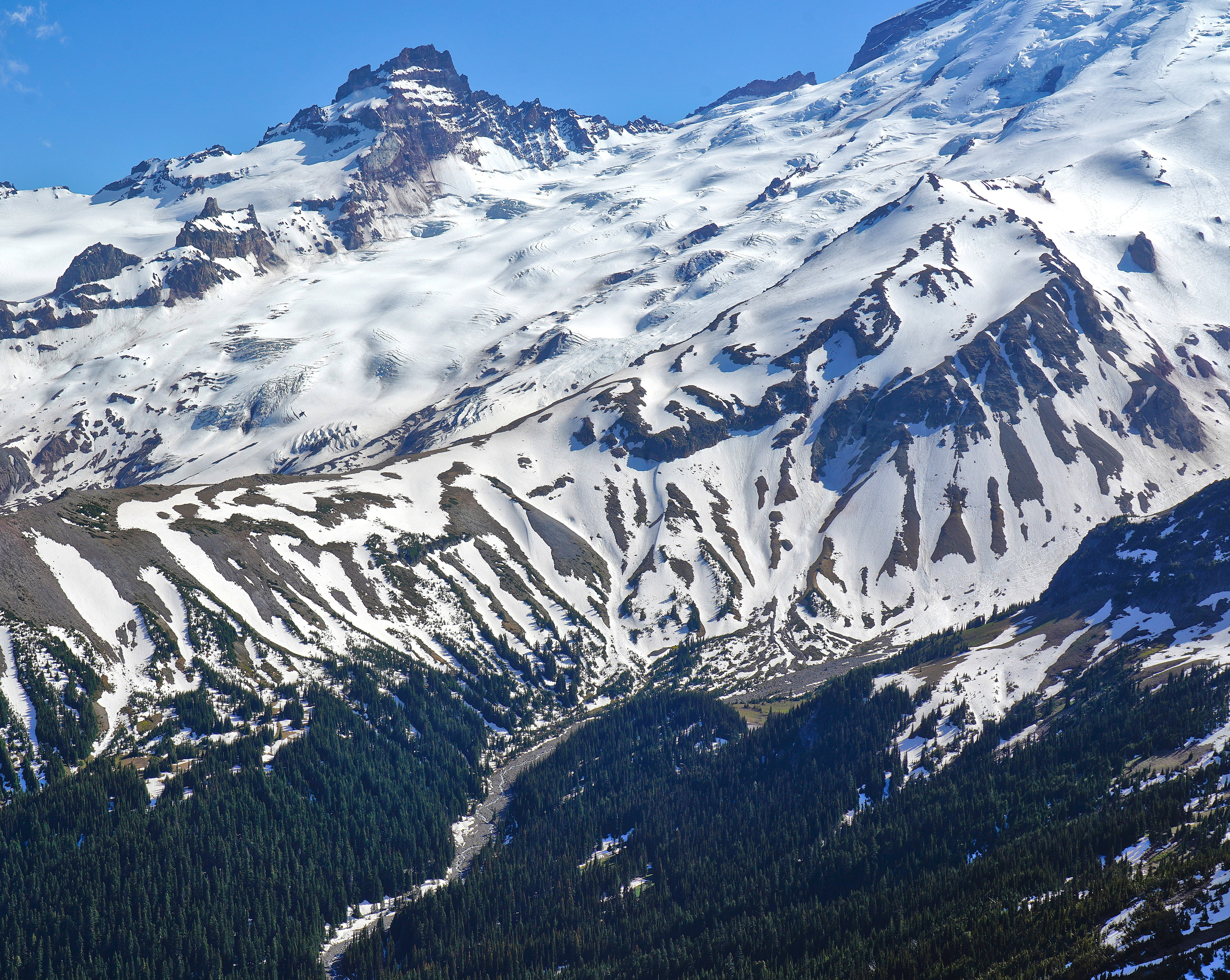
Little Tahoma (left) and Mount Ruth (right)

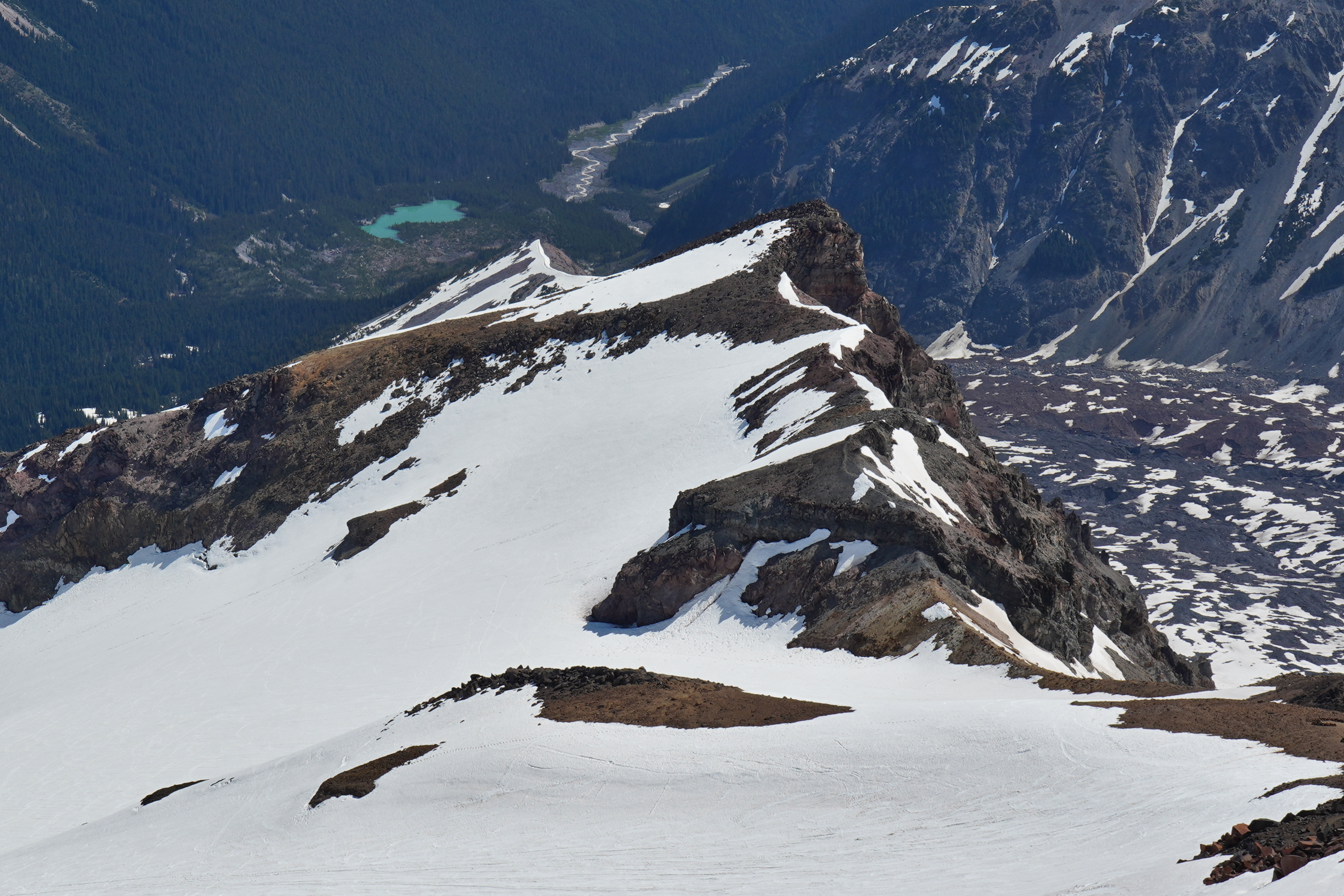
Mt. Ruth from above

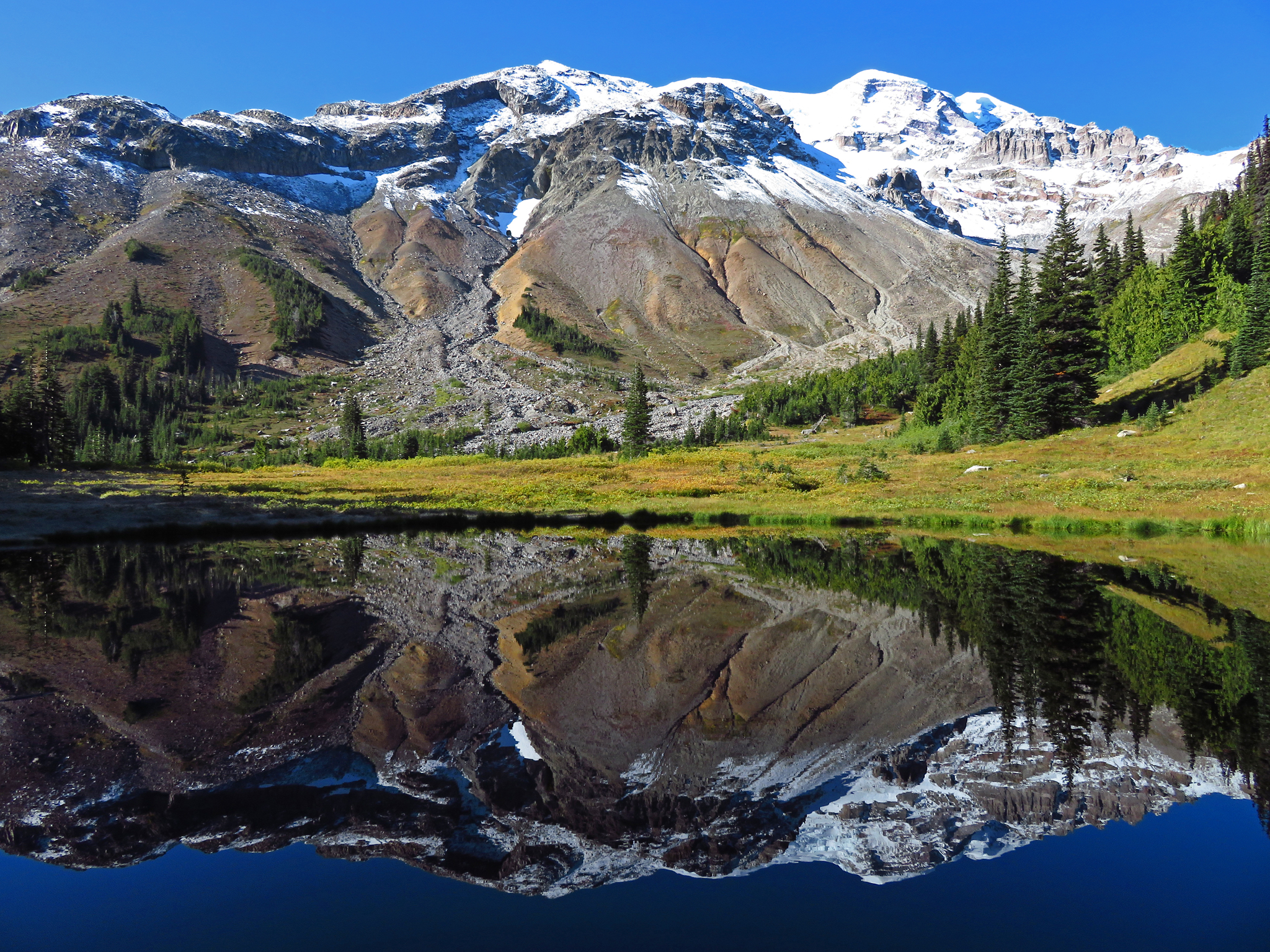
Mount Ruth (left of center) reflected in a pond in Glacier Basin

== See also ==
- Geology of the Pacific Northwest
