= Federation Forest State Park =

State park in the U.S. state of Washington

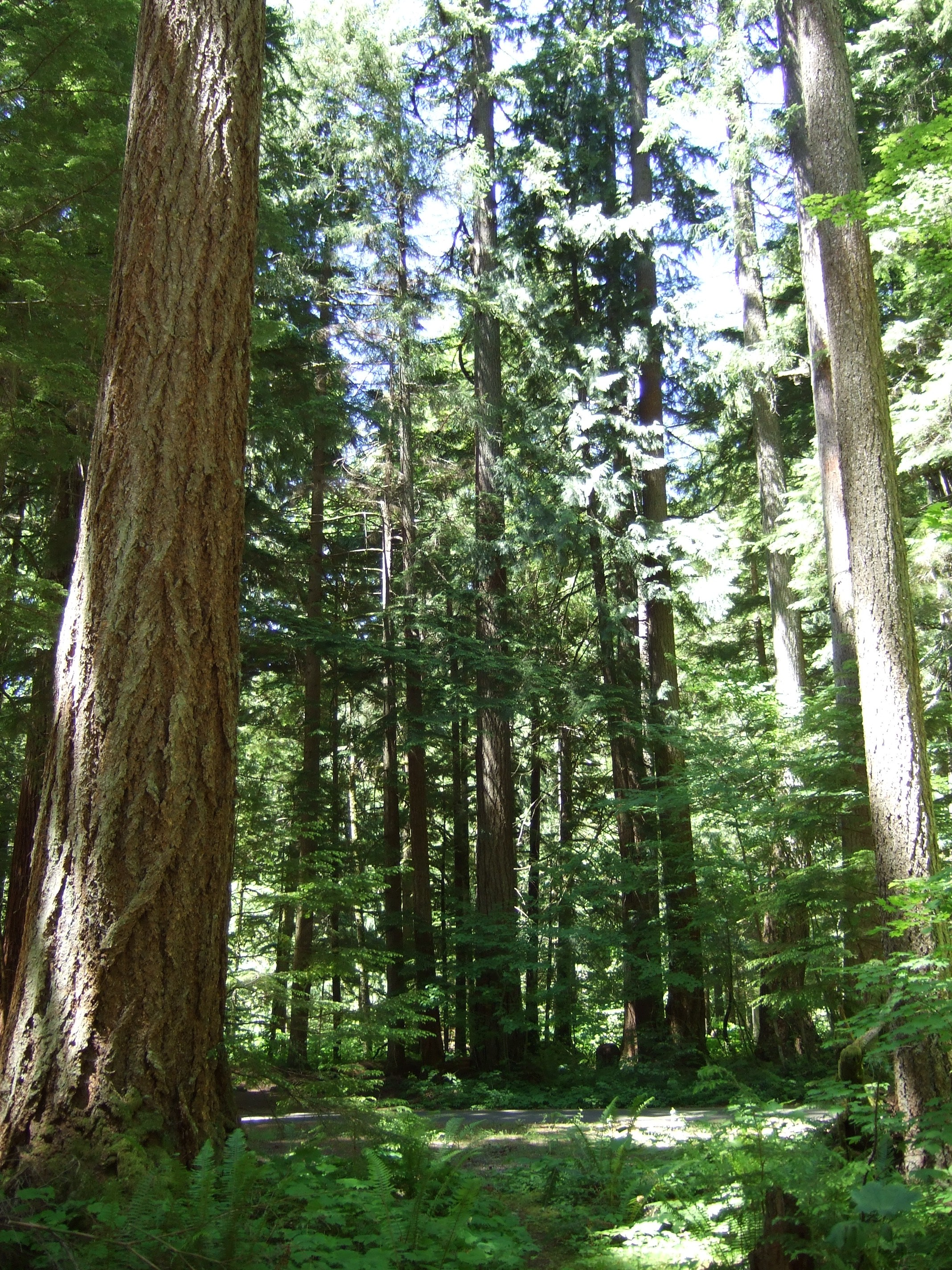
- Federation Forest State Park, July 2007

- Location within Washington (state) Location within the United States
- Location: King County, Washington, United States
- Coordinates: 47°09′11″N 121°41′21″W
- Area: 619 acres (251 ha)
- Elevation: 1,400 ft (430 m)
- Established: 1949
- Administrator: Washington State Parks and Recreation Commission
- Named for: General Federation of Women's Clubs
- Website: Official website

Federation Forest State Park is a 619-acre (251 ha) Washington state park on the White River in King County. The park is located 15 miles (24 km) east of Enumclaw on Route 410 about 30 miles (48 km) below the summit of Chinook Pass. The park features an old-growth forest that includes Douglas fir, western hemlock, Sitka spruce, and western redcedar trees. Park amenities include 7 miles (11 km) of hiking trails, picnicking facilities, and an interpretive center.

== History ==
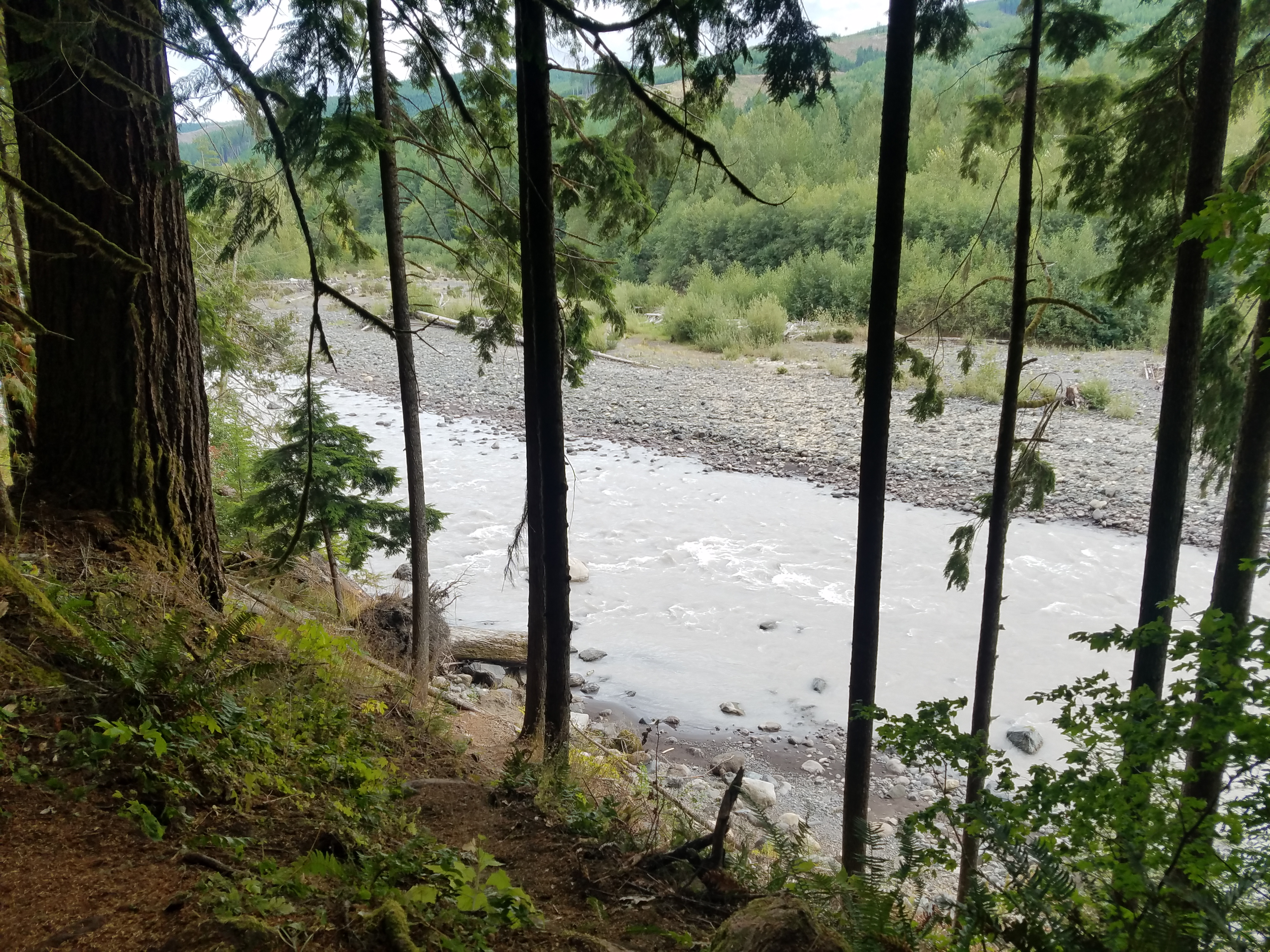
White River viewed from the park

The park gets its name from the Washington state chapter of the General Federation of Women's Clubs (GFWC-WS), which raised the initial $25,000 that was used to purchase the land for the park from a lumber company in 1928. GFWC-WS members were concerned about the rapid pace of deforestation around the country and wanted to preserve the remaining old-growth forest in the state of Washington. The original park was located about 8 miles (13 km) west of Snoqualmie Pass and was dedicated in 1934. In the following years, windstorms, widening of an adjacent highway, and logging on the adjacent property took a toll on the park, and the land was eventually sold back to the lumber company in 1938.

After about a decade, the present-day location along the White River was chosen and dedicated in 1949. In 1958, local educator and GFWC-WS member, Catherine T. Montgomery left the money from her estate to the park. The money was used to build the Catherine Montgomery Interpretive Center.

== Facilities ==
The Catherine Montgomery Interpretive Center has exhibits on the history of the General Federation of Women's Clubs and the Salish people's early presence along the White River. In front of the Interpretive Center is a native plant identification garden with markers identifying over two dozen plants. From the Interpretive Center a series of hiking trails fan out into the park.

- Fred Cleator Interpretive trail includes an east loop (0.5 miles (0.80 km)) and a longer loop (0.9 miles (1.4 km)). Both paths provide information signs along the route, explaining the diversity of the forest landscape.
- The Naches Trail is the original path first used by the Salish traversing the Cascades by the Naches Pass. It later became an early route for travel to Fort Steilacoom. By 1884 it was abandoned for easier routes across the mountains.
- Land of the Giants Interpretive Trail is a self-guided trail (0.5 miles (0.80 km)) through an old-growth forest.
- Wind in the Woods Trail (.15 miles (0.24 km)) is a loop with an educational sign describing the effects of wind on a forest.
- The Esther Maltby Trail on the River (0.5 miles (0.80 km)) is a primitive trail along the White River. This is a difficult trail due to the changes that occur each year from winter weather and spring floods. Part of the trail uses a boardwalk and a stairway creates a return loop. The trail is dedicated to Esther Maltby, a leader in the GFWC.
- North Trail (2.75 miles (4.43 km)) is across or north of Highway 410 and travels through hills, marshes and over mud slides.
