= Pacific, Washington =

City in Washington, United States

Pacific
- City
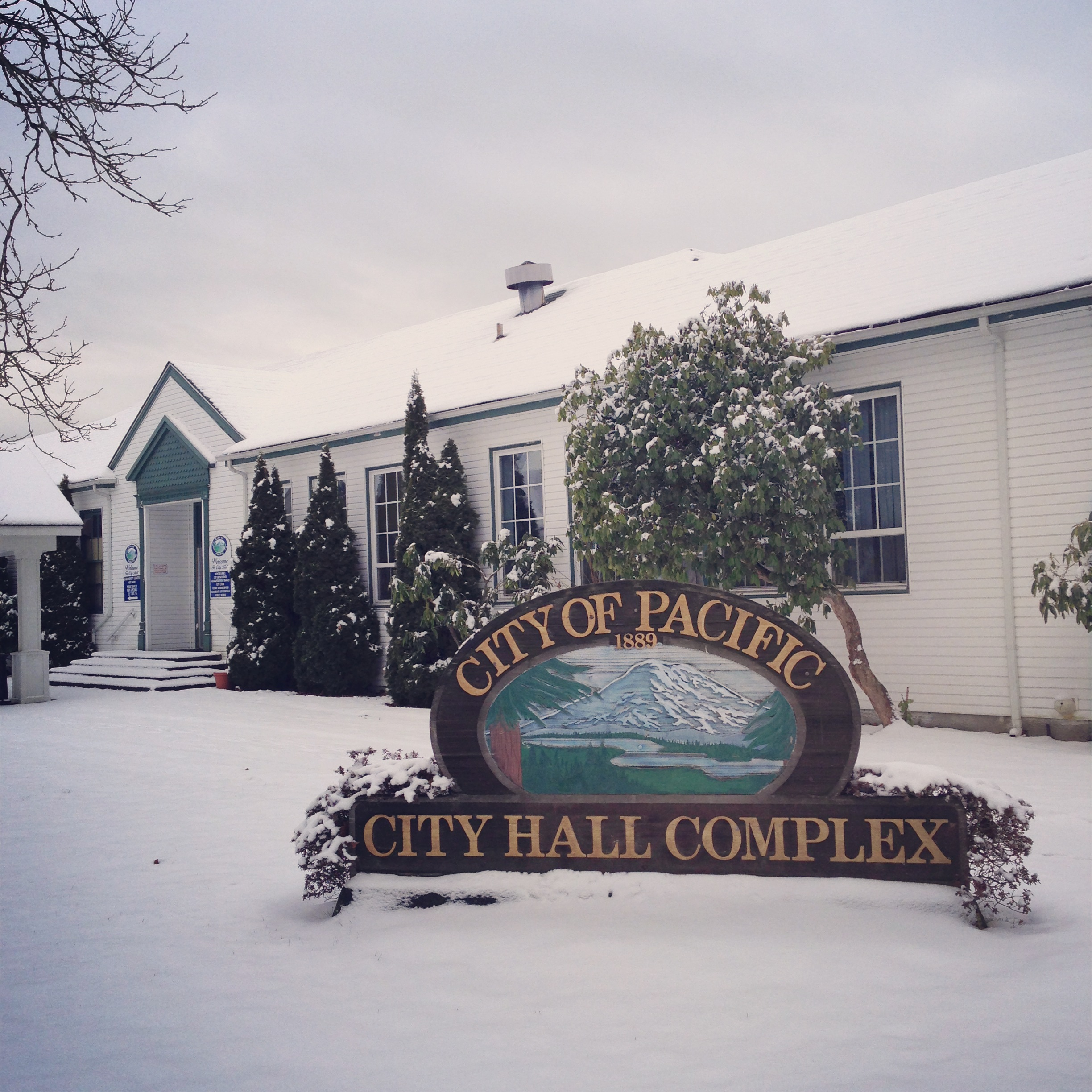
- Pacific City Hall

- Location of Pacific, Washington within King County
- Coordinates: 47°15′30″N 122°14′57″W
- Country: United States
- State: Washington
- Counties: King, Pierce

Government
  - Type: Mayor–council
  - Mayor: Vic Kave

Area
  - Total: 2.44 sq mi (6.31 km^{2})
  - Land: 2.42 sq mi (6.27 km^{2})
  - Water: 0.019 sq mi (0.05 km^{2})
- Elevation: 72 ft (22 m)

Population (2020)
  - Total: 7,235
  - Estimate (2021): 7,105
  - Density: 2,966.4/sq mi (1,145.35/km^{2})
- Time zone: UTC-8 (PST)
  - Summer (DST): UTC-7 (PDT)
- ZIP Code: 98047
- Area code: 253
- FIPS code: 53-52495
- GNIS feature ID: 2411349
- Website: pacificwa.gov

Pacific is a city in King and Pierce counties in the State of Washington. Located primarily in King County, the population was 7,235 at the 2020 census.

== History ==
Pacific was platted on April 10, 1906, by real estate promoter Clarence Dayton Hillman as "C.D. Hillman's Pacific City Addition to the City of Seattle". The development would take advantage of the nearby Puget Sound Electric Railway, which provided connections to Seattle and Tacoma. It was officially incorporated as a town on August 10, 1909.

In 1995, it annexed a portion of unincorporated Pierce County.

Record-breaking rains in November 2006 pushed the White River over its river banks along Pacific City Park, creating a temporary 25-acre (100,000 m^{2}) lake.

=== 2009 flooding ===
On January 8, 2009, the Army Corps of Engineers released water from the Mud Mountain Dam into the White River. The action was done to relieve pressure in the reservoir, which had reached its capacity due to heavy rain that was causing flooding around the Puget Sound region. A large amount of water was released very quickly, causing rapid and massive flooding in Pacific. Those affected had virtually no notice of the impending disaster. One of those affected by the flooding was noted local and international musician Jerry Miller, a founding member of Moby Grape, who had recently moved to Pacific from Tacoma. Miller lost virtually all of his possessions, including over forty years of memorabilia from his music career. Assistance to those affected by the flooding was provided by the Federal Emergency Management Agency (FEMA).

== Geography ==
According to the United States Census Bureau, the city has a total area of 2.43 square miles (6.29 km^{2}), of which, 2.42 square miles (6.27 km^{2}) is land and 0.01 square miles (0.03 km^{2}) is water. The lower White River, also known as the Stuck River, runs through the east side of Pacific, between Auburn and Sumner.

== Demographics ==
Historical population
Census	Pop.	Note	%±
1910	413		—
1920	320		−22.5%
1930	347		8.4%
1940	357		2.9%
1950	755		111.5%
1960	1,577		108.9%
1970	1,831		16.1%
1980	2,261		23.5%
1990	4,622		104.4%
2000	5,527		19.6%
2010	6,606		19.5%
2020	7,235		9.5%
2021 (est.)	7,105		−1.8%
U.S. Decennial Census; 2020 Census

=== 2020 census ===
As of the 2020 census, Pacific had a population of 7,235. The median age was 34.3 years. 26.6% of residents were under the age of 18 and 10.0% of residents were 65 years of age or older. For every 100 females there were 104.8 males, and for every 100 females age 18 and over there were 103.4 males age 18 and over.

100.0% of residents lived in urban areas, while 0.0% lived in rural areas.

There were 2,400 households in Pacific, of which 40.0% had children under the age of 18 living in them. Of all households, 49.1% were married-couple households, 19.1% were households with a male householder and no spouse or partner present, and 21.0% were households with a female householder and no spouse or partner present. About 18.7% of all households were made up of individuals and 6.4% had someone living alone who was 65 years of age or older.

There were 2,485 housing units, of which 3.4% were vacant. The homeowner vacancy rate was 0.4% and the rental vacancy rate was 4.6%.

Racial composition as of the 2020 census
Race	Number	Percent
White	3,873	53.5%
Black or African American	432	6.0%
American Indian and Alaska Native	115	1.6%
Asian	745	10.3%
Native Hawaiian and Other Pacific Islander	322	4.5%
Some other race	901	12.5%
Two or more races	847	11.7%
Hispanic or Latino (of any race)	1,489	20.6%

=== 2010 census ===
As of the 2010 census, there were 6,606 people, 2,269 households, and 1,605 families living in the city. The population density was 2,729.8 inhabitants per square mile (1,054.0/km^{2}). There were 2,422 housing units at an average density of 1,000.8 per square mile (386.4/km^{2}). The racial makeup of the city was 69.2% White, 3.1% African American, 1.9% Native American, 9.0% Asian, 1.8% Pacific Islander, 8.5% from other races, and 6.4% from two or more races. Hispanic or Latino of any race were 15.1% of the population.

There were 2,269 households, of which 43.0% had children under the age of 18 living with them, 46.5% were married couples living together, 15.0% had a female householder with no husband present, 9.2% had a male householder with no wife present, and 29.3% were non-families. 20.9% of all households were made up of individuals, and 5.5% had someone living alone who was 65 years of age or older. The average household size was 2.88 and the average family size was 3.32.

The median age in the city was 32.8 years. 28.1% of residents were under the age of 18; 10.1% were between the ages of 18 and 24; 28.7% were from 25 to 44; 25.7% were from 45 to 64; and 7.2% were 65 years of age or older. The gender makeup of the city was 50.0% male and 50.0% female.

=== 2000 census ===
As of the 2000 census, there were 5,527 people, 1,992 households, and 1,444 families living in the city. The population density was 2,158.1 people per square mile (833.6/km^{2}). There were 2,090 housing units at an average density of 816.1 per square mile (315.2/km^{2}). The racial makeup of the city was 85.38% White, 1.43% African American, 1.61% Native American, 4.72% Asian, 0.20% Pacific Islander, 2.95% from other races, and 3.71% from two or more races. Hispanic or Latino of any race were 6.48% of the population.

There were 1,992 households, out of which 44.2% had children under the age of 18 living with them, 49.8% were married couples living together, 15.3% had a female householder with no husband present, and 27.5% were non-families. 19.8% of all households were made up of individuals, and 3.2% had someone living alone who was 65 years of age or older. The average household size was 2.77 and the average family size was 3.16.

In the city, the population was spread out, with 31.2% under the age of 18, 9.5% from 18 to 24, 35.2% from 25 to 44, 18.7% from 45 to 64, and 5.4% who were 65 years of age or older. The median age was 31 years. For every 100 women there were 99.4 men. For every 100 women age 18 and over, there were 98.9 men.

The median income for a household in the city was $45,673, and the median income for a family was $47,694. Males had a median income of $36,594 versus $28,301 for females. The per capita income for the city was $18,228. About 7.9% of families and 10.8% of the population were below the poverty line, including 10.4% of those under age 18 and none of those age 65 or over.

== Government ==
Presidential Elections Results
Year	Republican	Democratic	Third Parties
2020	46.14% 1,334	50.85% 1,470	3.01% 87

The city has a mayor, city council and police department. In 2013, mayor Cy Sun was recalled by voters and replaced by a city councilmember following his firing of most of the government's department heads. Sun was later arrested by the city police department for attempting to enter the sealed clerk's office during an investigation into alleged destruction of city documents by the mayor's office.
