= Foster, Washington =

Ghost town in Washington (state)

- Ghost town
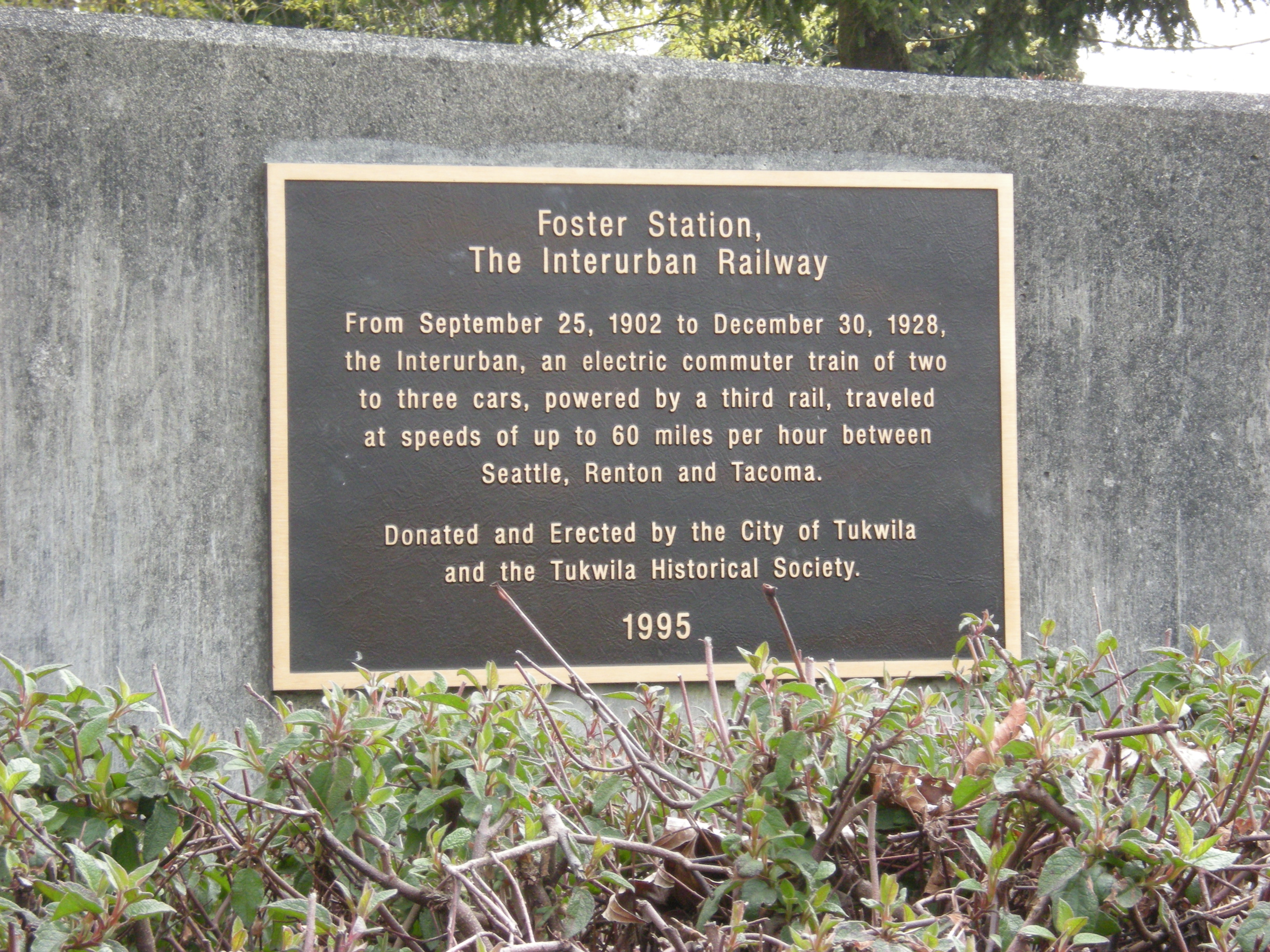
- Plaque memorializing the former Foster Station on the Puget Sound Electric Railway

- Location within Washington (state) Location within the United States
- Coordinates: 47°28′53″N 122°16′32″W
- Country: United States
- State: Washington
- County: King
- Established: 1903
- Time zone: UTC-8 (Pacific (PST))
  - Summer (DST): UTC-7 (PDT)

Foster, Washington was a former community in King County in the U.S. state of Washington. After being annexed in 1989, Foster's former area is a part of the city of Tukwila.

A post office called Foster was established in 1903, and remained in operation until 1907. The community was named after Joseph Foster, an early settler.

Besides the post office, at one time it had a school. In the 19th century, there was a Foster Ferry Landing on the Duwamish River near the junction of the river, 56th Avenue South, and the Green River Trail. The name lingers on in the Foster Golf Links immediately upstream of that point and in Joseph Foster Memorial Park about 0.25 miles (0.40 km) to the south-southwest. A rail station, known as Foster Station on the Puget Sound Electric Railway (the "Interurban"), existed at the location of a Tukwila Park and Ride.
