= Mud Mountain Dam =

Coordinates: 47°08′32″N 121°55′53″W

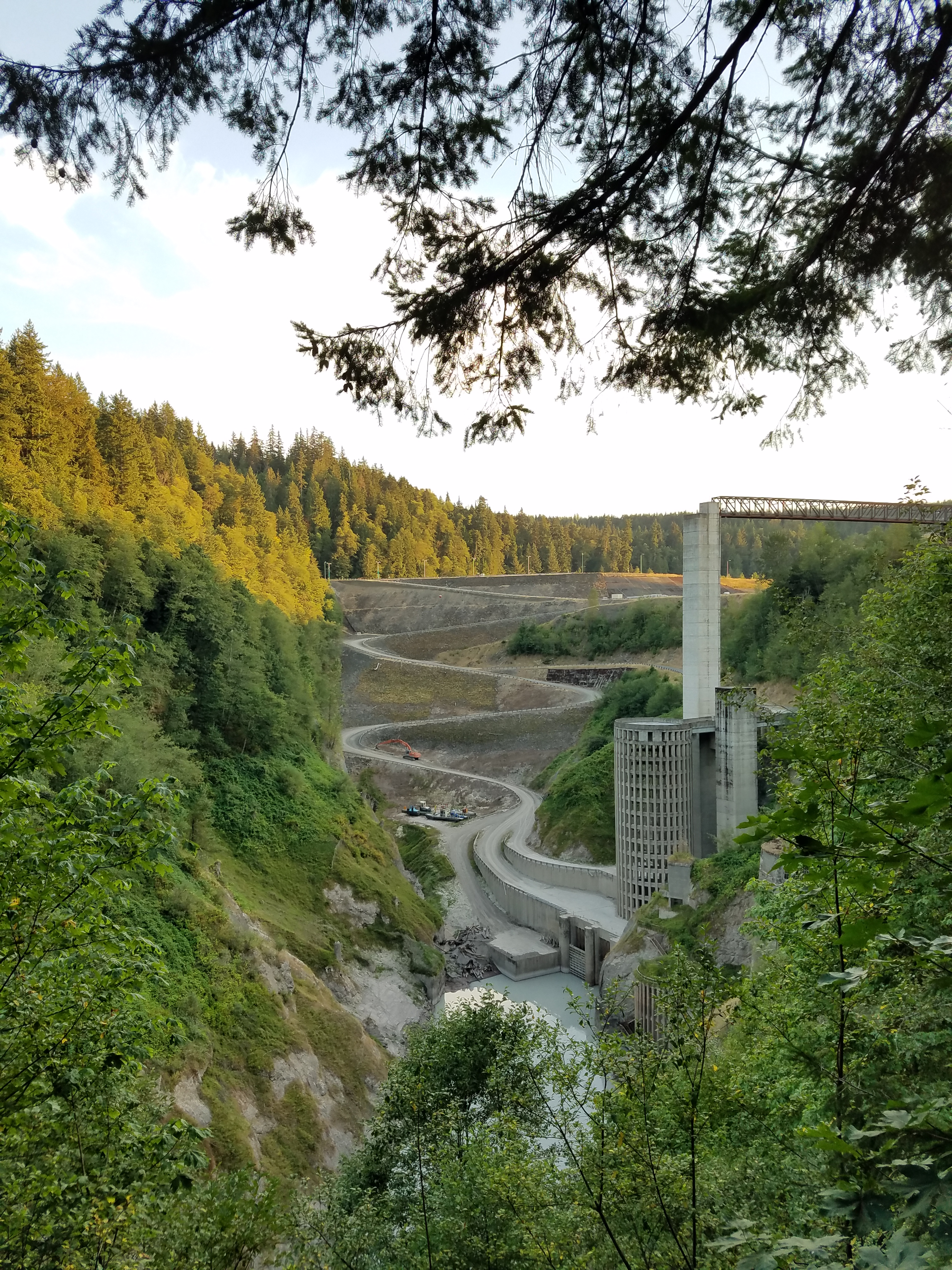
- View of the back of the dam from day-use park.
- Interactive map of Mud Mountain Dam
- Location: King County, Washington, USA
- Construction began: 1939
- Opening date: 1948
- Operator: U.S. Army Corps of Engineers

Dam and spillways
- Impounds: White River
- Height: 432 ft (132 m)

Reservoir
- Creates: Mud Mountain Lake
- Total capacity: 106,000 acre⋅ft (131,000,000 m^{3})

Mud Mountain Dam is a dam in King County, Washington, a few miles southeast of Enumclaw. The dam impounds the White River and is used for flood control.

The dam was finished in 1948 by the United States Army Corps of Engineers, although the project had been authorized by an act of Congress in June 1936. Construction had begun in 1939 and was delayed by World War II. At 432 feet high, it was the highest rock- and earth-filled dam in the world at its completion.

Mud Mountain Dam protects the lower White and Puyallup River valleys from flooding by holding back water from heavy rains or excessive snow melt and slowly releasing it downstream. From the 1870s local farmers of King and Pierce County competed for water from the White River, dealing not only with periodic flooding but with changes in its channel, notably in 1906 when the White permanently broke through to the shorter, southward channel of the Stuck River. Consultation with the engineer Hiram M. Chittenden eventually led to the decision to dam the river.

The created reservoir, Mud Mountain Lake, is a riverine, marshy intermittent lake. The lake is usually dry except for the normal flow of the White River, but it fills with water during periods of high flow. The Corps of Engineers operates a day-use park at the dam site, the Mud Mountain Recreational Area, with picnic facilities, interpretive exhibits, and ten miles of hiking trails.
