= Clearwater Wilderness =

Wilderness area in Washington, United States

- IUCN category Ib (wilderness area)
- Location within the United States
- Location: Mount Baker-Snoqualmie National Forest, Pierce County, Washington, United States
- Nearest city: Enumclaw
- Coordinates: 47°03′28″N 121°49′27″W
- Area: 14,647 acres (5,927 ha)
- Established: 1984
- Governing body: United States Forest Service

Clearwater Wilderness is a 14,647-acre (5,927 ha) wilderness area in the North Cascades mountain range, in northern Washington state, of the Northwestern United States. It is located in the Mount Baker-Snoqualmie National Forest, southeast of Tacoma in northeastern Pierce County.

It was created by Congress in 1984, under the 1964 Wilderness Act that established the National Wilderness Preservation System. Its southern border reaches Mount Rainier National Park, affording views of Mount Rainier from its trails.

== Description ==
Bearhead Mountain, the highest peak of the Clearwater Wilderness, is 6,089 feet (1,856 m) in elevation. Below are the headwaters of the north-flowing Clearwater River, and many streams. Eight small lakes, including Summit Lake, are within the wilderness area.

Old-growth forests of Douglas fir, western hemlock and western redcedar are protected, and are reachable by hiking trails. The forest understory is made up mostly of ferns and mosses.

The season between October and May receives 90 percent of the area's annual precipitation. Snow in amounts reaching 25 ft (7.6 m) can remain as late as July in high areas.

Wildlife in the area includes bears, deer, marmots, elk, cougars and pikas, as well as birds like eagles, grouse and songbirds.

== Trails ==
- Summit Lake Trail is an easy 2.5-mile-long (4.0 km) hike up 1,500 feet (460 m) to Summit Lake. Mount Rainier can be seen from a high point near the lake.
- Clearwater Trail is a difficult 8.1-mile (13.0 km) hike over the Clearwater River and a number of creeks, and through old growth and meadows.
- Carbon Trail has the same trailhead as Clearwater Trail and meanders south for 9.4 miles (15.1 km) to join the Summit Lake Trail.

== Gallery ==
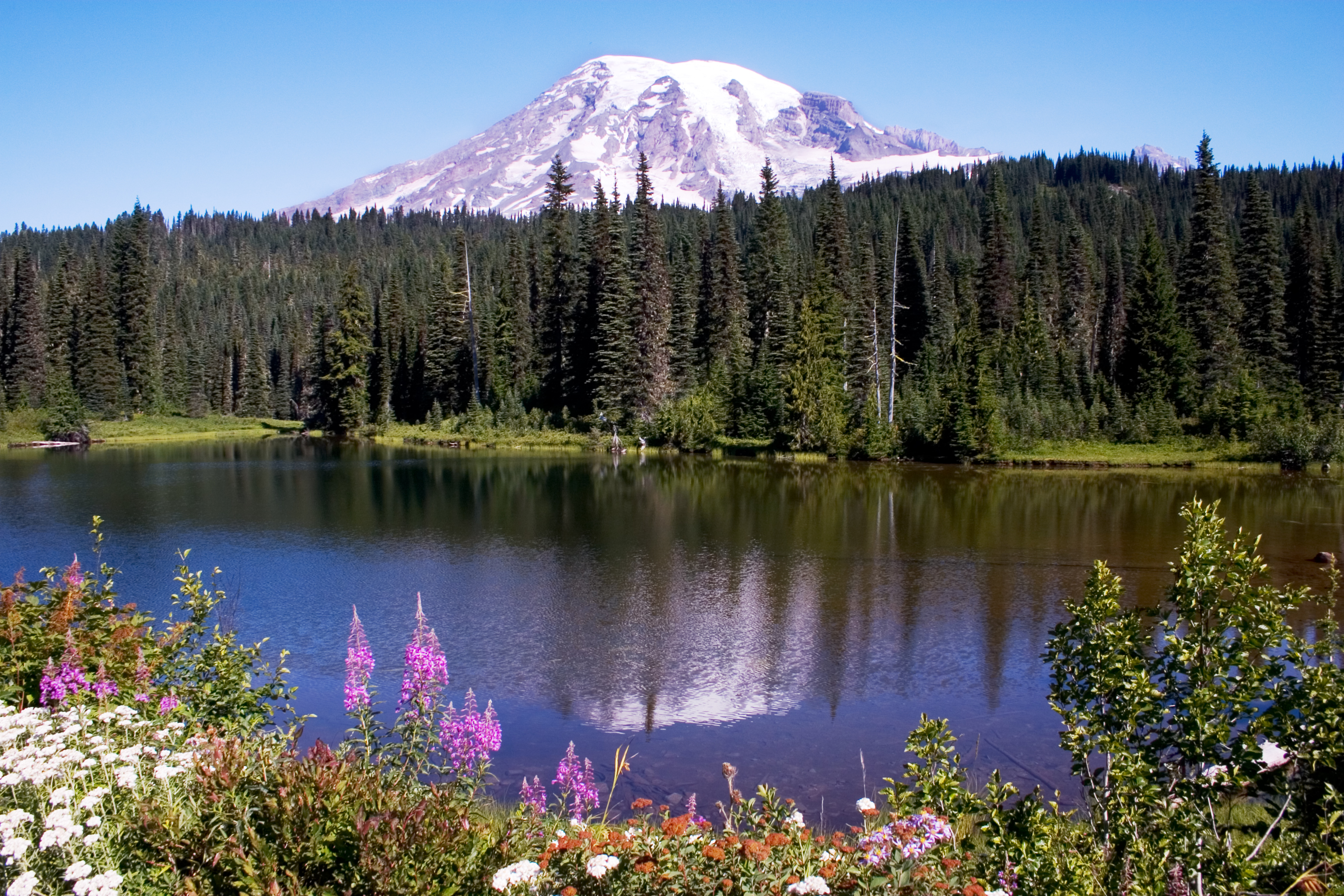
Mount Rainier, seen from the Clearwater Wilderness

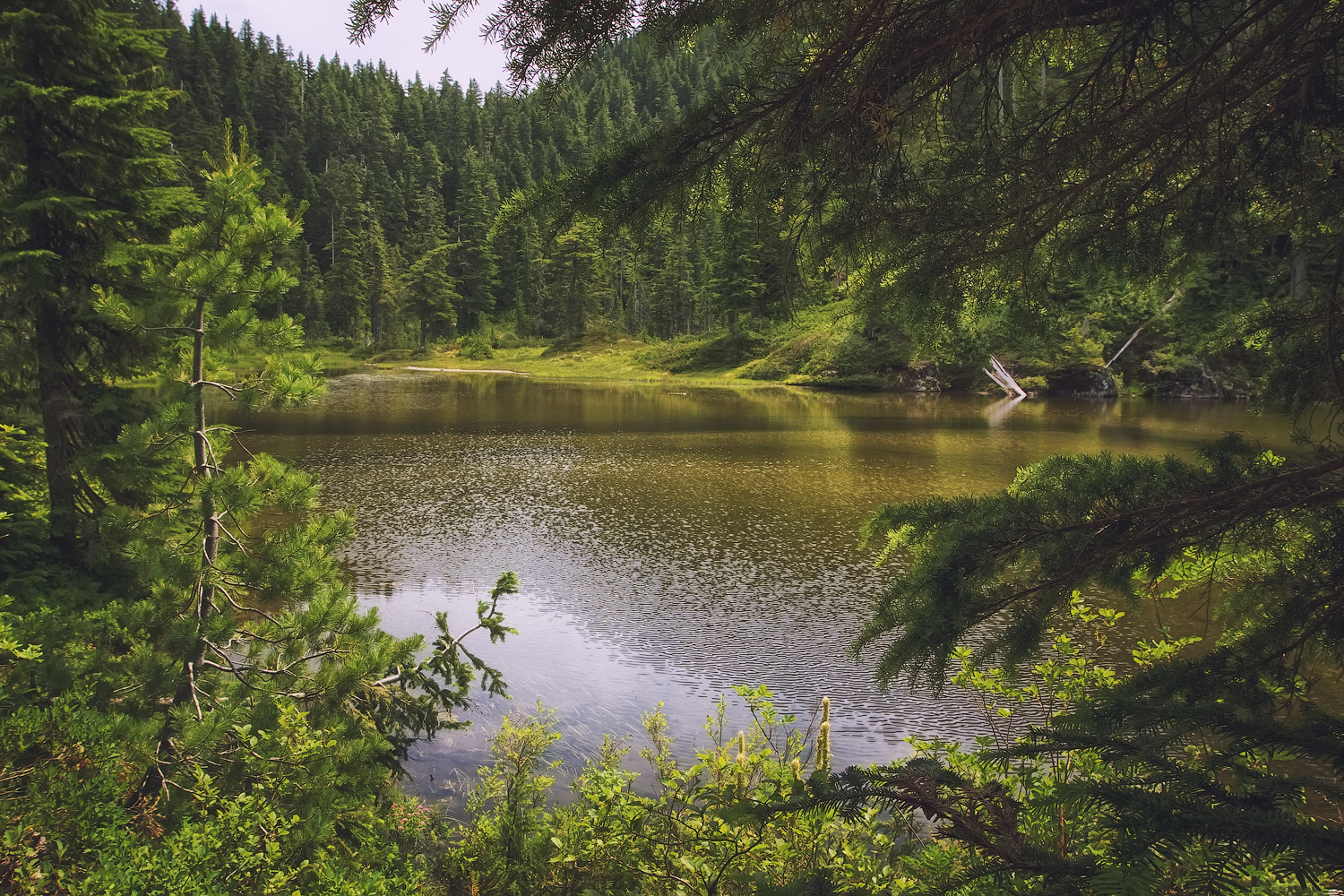
Twin Lake, on the Summit Lake Trail

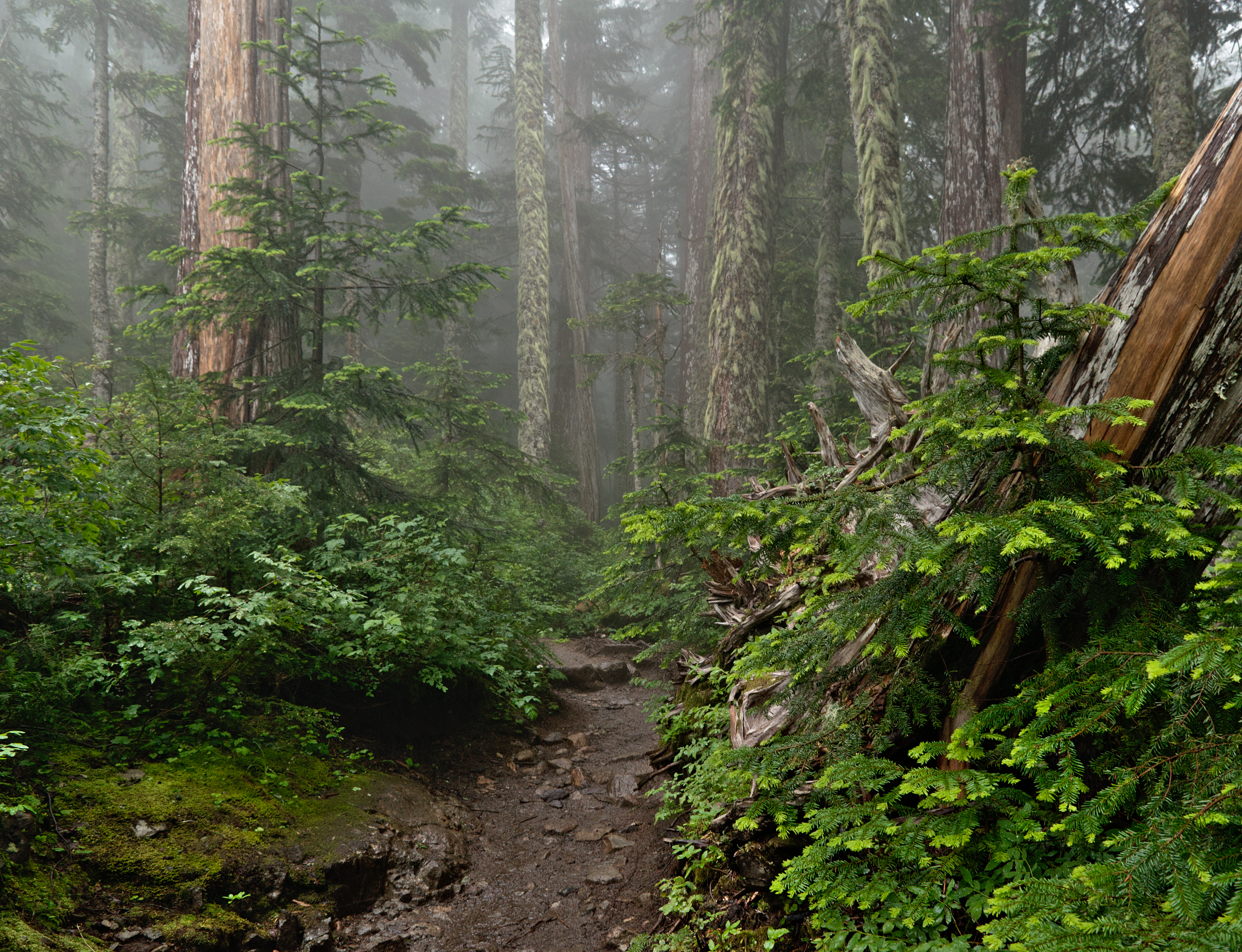
Summit Lake trail
