= Catherine T. Montgomery =

American educator

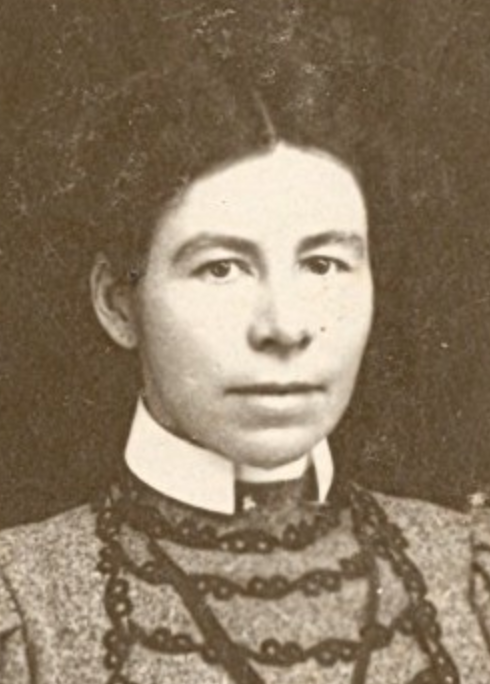
- Catherine Montgomery as a young educator in Washington state
- Born: April 1, 1867; Prince Edward Island
- Died: September 17, 1957 (aged 90); Bellingham, Washington
- Occupations: Educator, clubwoman, philanthropist, hiker
- Known for: "Mother of the Pacific Crest Trail"

Catherine T. Montgomery (April 1, 1867 – September 17, 1957) was a Canadian-born American educator, clubwoman, and hiker based in Bellingham, Washington. She donated money and land to improve Federation Forest State Park, and is known as the "Mother of the Pacific Crest Trail".

== Early life ==
Montgomery was born in Valleyfield, Prince Edward Island, and raised in Schuyler, Nebraska. Her father was a railroad carpenter; her parents, William Montgomery and Jessie MacPherson Montgomery, were born in Scotland. She described herself as a cousin or niece of author Lucy Maud Montgomery. She graduated from the University of Washington.

== Career ==
When Montgomery was 20, she moved to Chehalis, Washington, to become a teacher. In 1899, Montgomery joined the first faculty of New Whatcom Normal School, a precursor institution to Western Washington University. She educated hundreds of teachers in this role. She also chaired the Bellingham Lecture Course, a public program of speakers and performers.

Montgomery supported women's suffrage, prohibition, and labor reform laws. She was active in women's clubs and helped found Bellingham's Progressive, Literary, and Fraternal Club (PLF) in 1900. Although she decried the bureaucracy of state-run education, she ran for state superintendent of schools in 1920. She was president of the PLF from 1922 to 1923.

Montgomery retired from teaching in 1926. She ran for county superintendent of schools in 1930. In 1931 she proposed parent education classes in Bellingham. She was active in the Washington State Federation of Women's Clubs.

== Hiking and travel ==
Montgomery was an avid traveler and hiker. In 1905 she traveled with writer Ella Rhoads Higginson around Alaska by train for almost two months. She felt the 1908 Messina earthquake while studying in Rome.

Montgomery was part of a 1906 Portland Mazamas mountaineering attempt to climb Mount Baker's northeast face. The group had 71 men and eight women, with the women wearing feathered hats during the trip. They used sleeping bags and sledded down the Mazama Dome in tin basins, steering with cedar poles. This trip initiated the creation of the Seattle Mountaineers.

In January 1926, Montgomery met mountaineer and textbook salesman Joseph Hazard, and described her hope for a hike in the West to match the Appalachian Trail through fourteen eastern states. That evening, he shared the idea at a meeting of the Mount Baker Club in Bellingham. This spurred the outdoor groups of the Pacific Northwest to organize around building the trail, along with the aid of the Forest Service. While Clinton C. Clarke is called "the Father of the Pacific Crest Trail", his involvement in the project came several years later. Montgomery's contributions were not known until recently, and not recorded in documents like her obituary. However, she is now labeled as the "Mother of the Pacific Crest Trail".

== Personal life and legacy ==
Montgomery lived with fellow educator Ida Agnes Baker; they were both among the founding members of the PLF. "Memories of financial struggle, of trans-continental trips, of farming together, come to me as I recall the locking of Ida Baker’s life with mine, but above all comes the memory of tramping together", she wrote in a eulogy for her partner, who died when she was struck by a street car in 1921.

Montgomery died in 1957, aged 90 years, in Bellingham. She left much of her estate to the Washington State Federation of Women's Clubs to enlarge and improve Federation Forest State Park, where the Catherine Montgomery Nature Interpretive Center hosts educational programs about the forest. In 2010, she was inducted into the Northwest Women's Hall of Fame, as "the Mother of the Pacific Crest Trail".

Montgomery's former home in Bellingham became housing for the Sisters of Newark serving at St. Joseph's Hospital.
