= Inter Glacier =

Glacier in Washington, United States

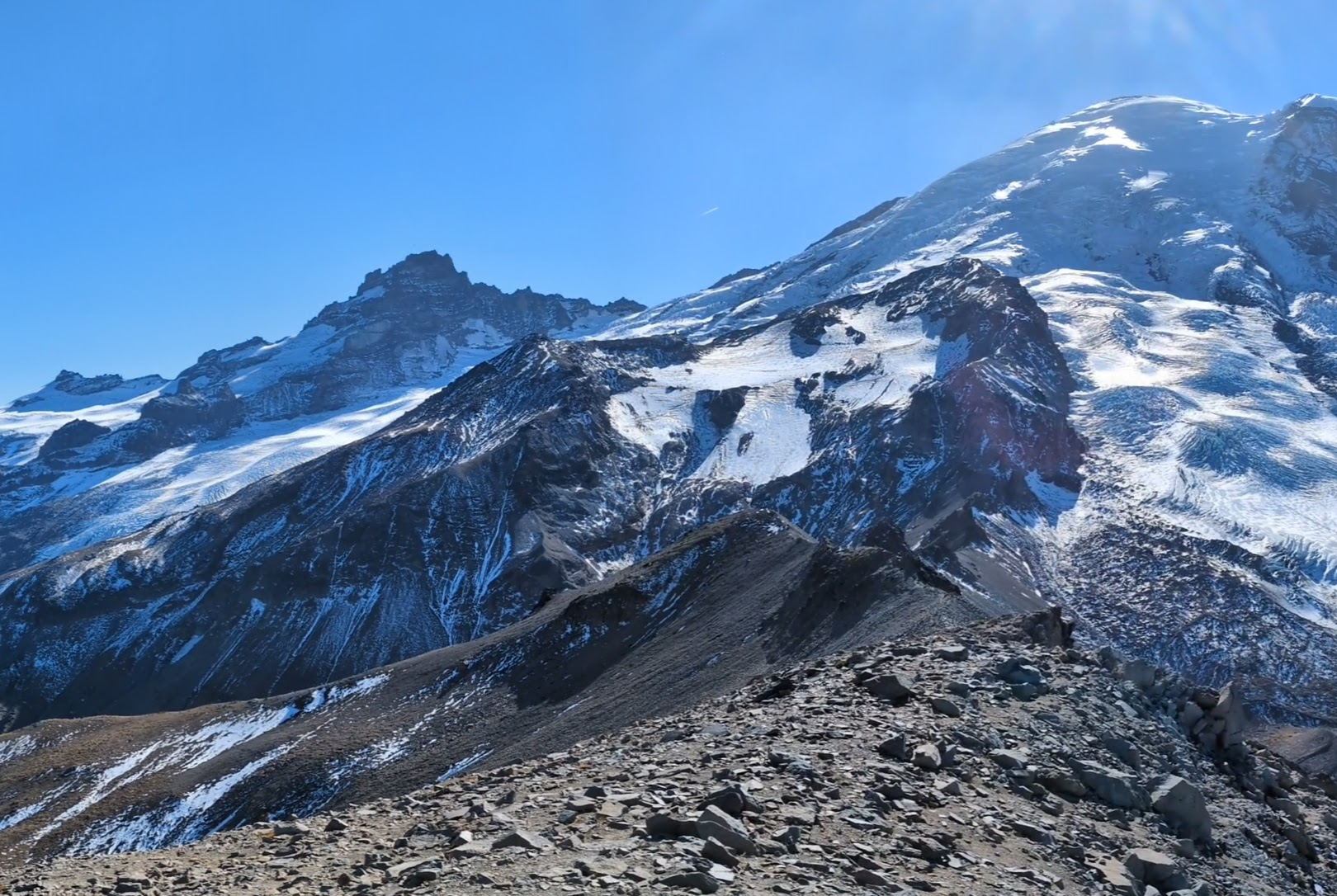
- Steamboat Prow, 9,680 feet (2,950 m), (center) with the small Inter Glacier on its northeast face
- Interactive map of Inter Glacier
- Type: Mountain glacier
- Location: Mount Rainier, Pierce County, Washington, USA
- Coordinates: 46°52′35″N 121°43′37″W
- Area: 0.206 square miles (0.53 km^{2}), 2021; 0.3 square miles (0.78 km^{2}), 1983

The Inter Glacier or Interglacier is a small glacier on the northeast face of Mount Rainier in Washington. As of 2021, the body of ice covers an estimated area of 0.206 square miles (0.53 km^{2}). The glacier lies on top of a wedge called the Steamboat Prow in between the Emmons Glacier to the south and the Winthrop Glacier to the north. The glacier starts below the Steamboat Prow at about 9,400 feet (2,900 m) and flows northeast down to its moraine at 7,000 feet (2,100 m). A small subsidiary peak of Rainier, named Mount Ruth, lies adjacent to the glacier. Meltwater from the glacier is the source of the Inter Fork of the White River.

People climbing the Emmons Glacier route to the Mount Rainier summit typically travel via the Inter Glacier to Camp Curtis or Camp Schurman, located near the head of the glacier. Crevasses are a hazard that injured Chris Kapaun in 1998 while descending unroped.

== See also ==
- List of glaciers
