= Clearwater River (White River tributary) =

River in Washington, United States

Coordinates: 47°8′47″N 121°50′5″W

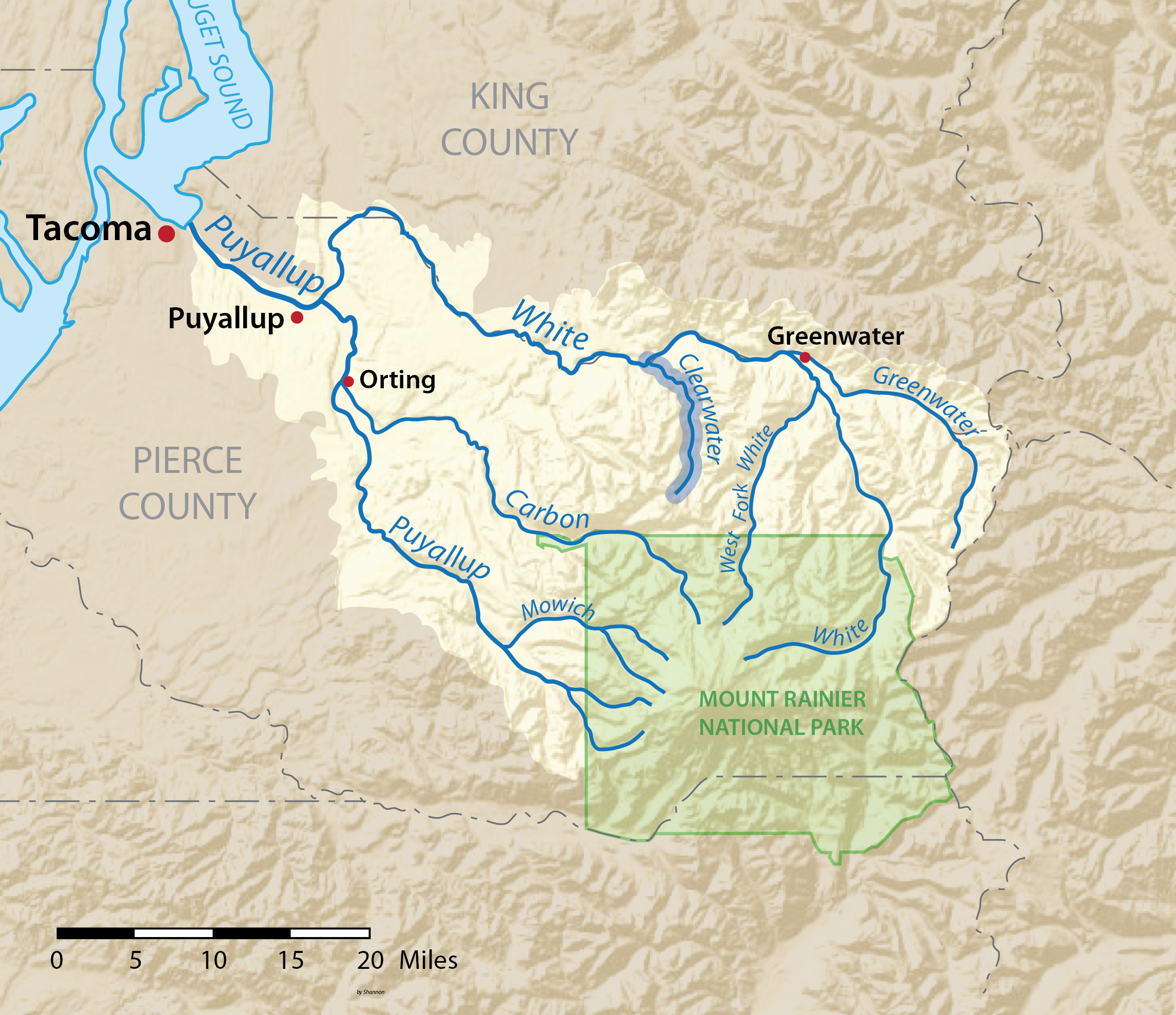
The Clearwater River is shown highlighted in the Puyallup River watershed.

The Clearwater River is a river located in the Clearwater Wilderness, in the Cascade Range in Pierce County, Washington. The river drains the wilderness area and is a tributary of the White River.

== See also ==
- List of rivers in Washington
