= White River (Puyallup River) =

White River Stuck River
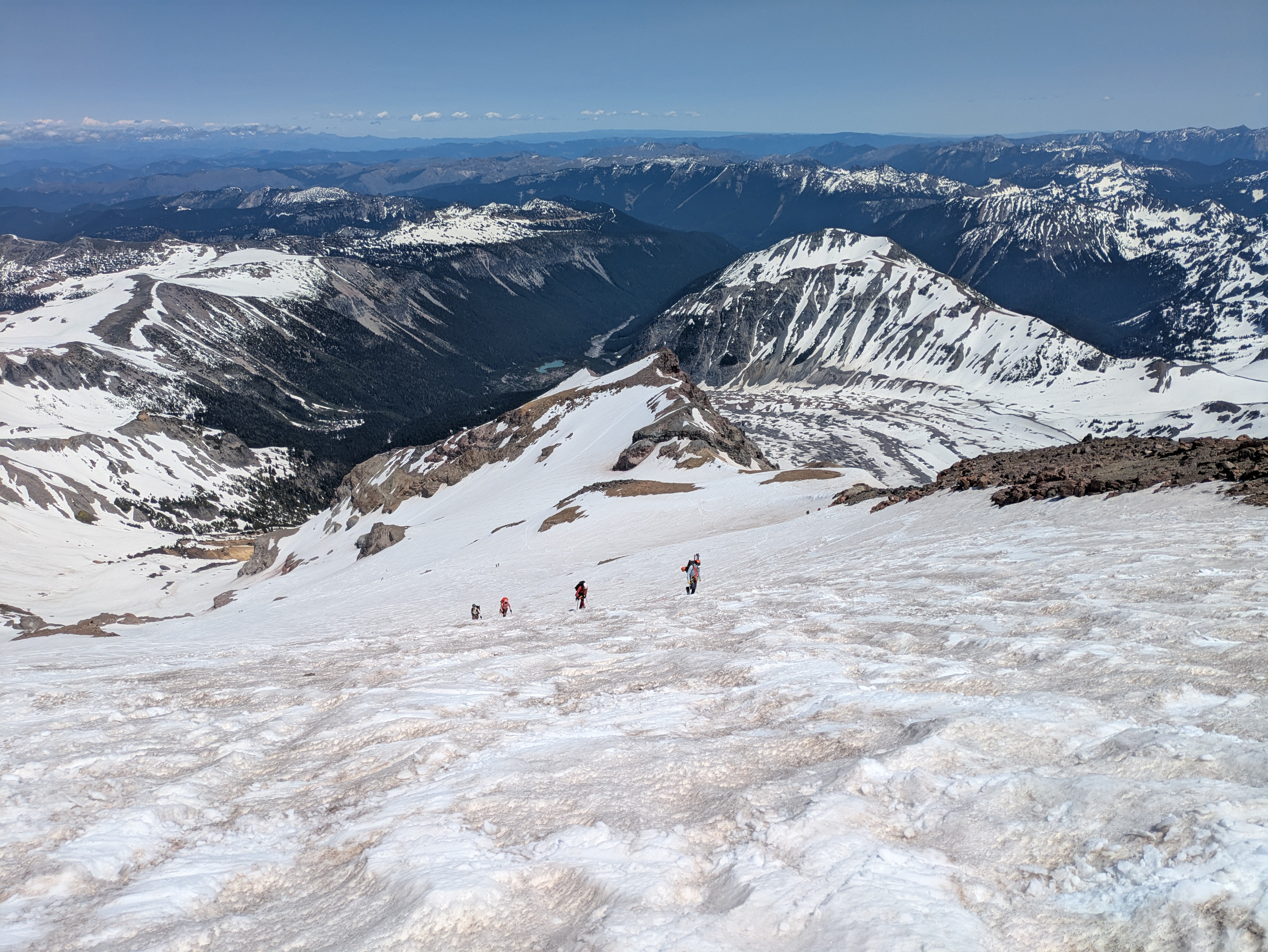
- From Steamboat Prow looking down at the Inter Glacier, source of the Inter Fork (left), and the moraine of the Emmons Glacier (right)

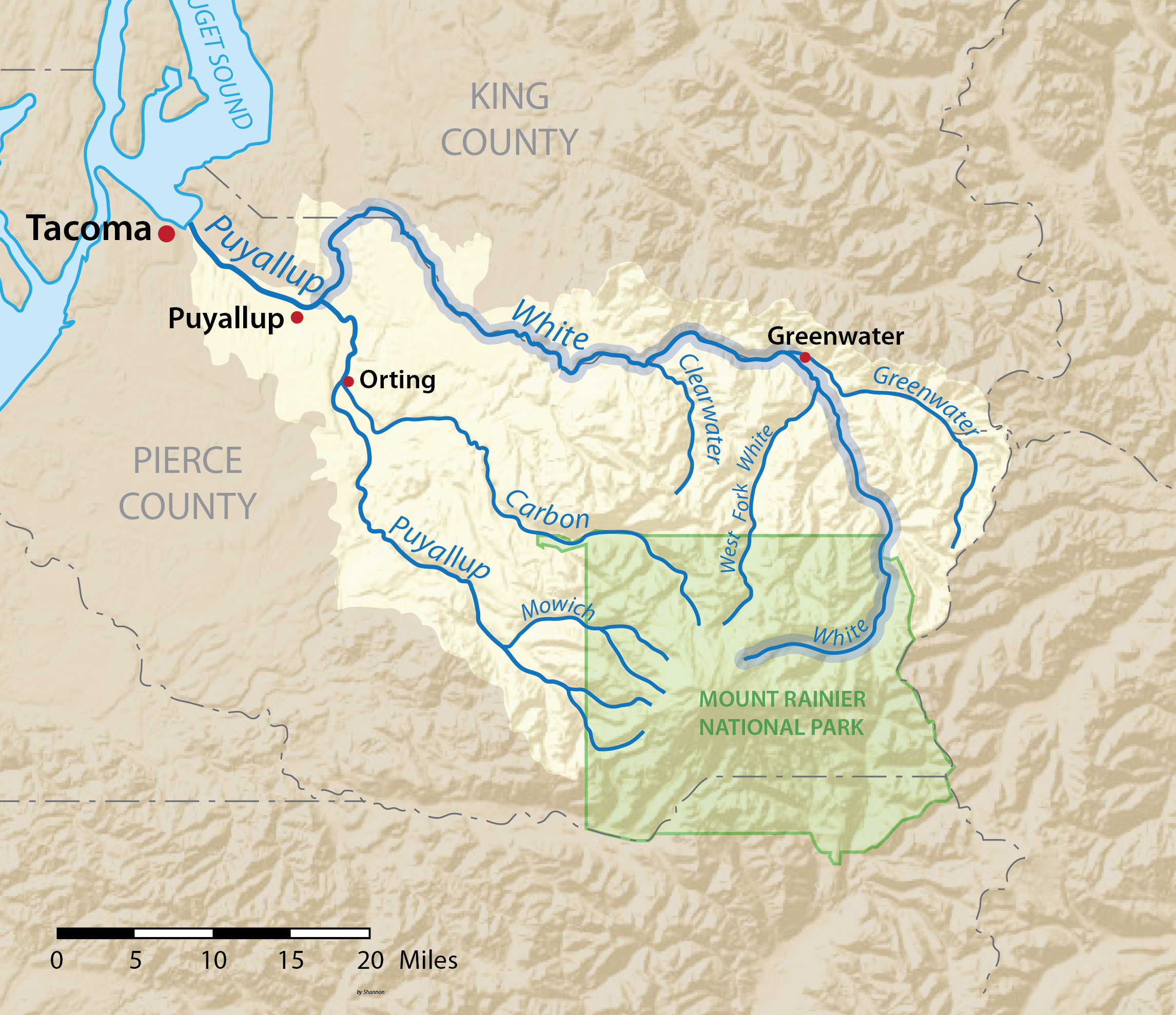
- The White River is shown highlighted in the Puyallup River watershed

Location
- Country: United States
- State: Washington
- Counties: Pierce, King
- City: Buckley

Physical characteristics
- Source: Mount Rainier
  - location: Emmons Glacier
  - coordinates: 46°53′7″N 121°40′24″W
  - elevation: 5,050 ft (1,540 m)
- Mouth: Puyallup River
  - coordinates: 47°11′59″N 122°15′31″W
  - elevation: 29 ft (8.8 m)
- Length: 75 mi (121 km)
- Basin size: 494 sq mi (1,280 km^{2})
- Discharge
  - location: Buckley
  - average: 1,435 cu ft/s (40.6 m^{3}/s)
  - minimum: 59 cu ft/s (1.7 m^{3}/s)
  - maximum: 17,000 cu ft/s (480 m^{3}/s)

Basin features
- Tributaries
  - left: West Fork White River, Clearwater River
  - right: Greenwater River

The White River is a white, glacial river in the U.S. state of Washington. It flows about 75 miles (121 km) from its source, the Emmons Glacier on Mount Rainier, to join the Puyallup River at Sumner. It defines part of the boundary between King and Pierce counties.

== Course ==
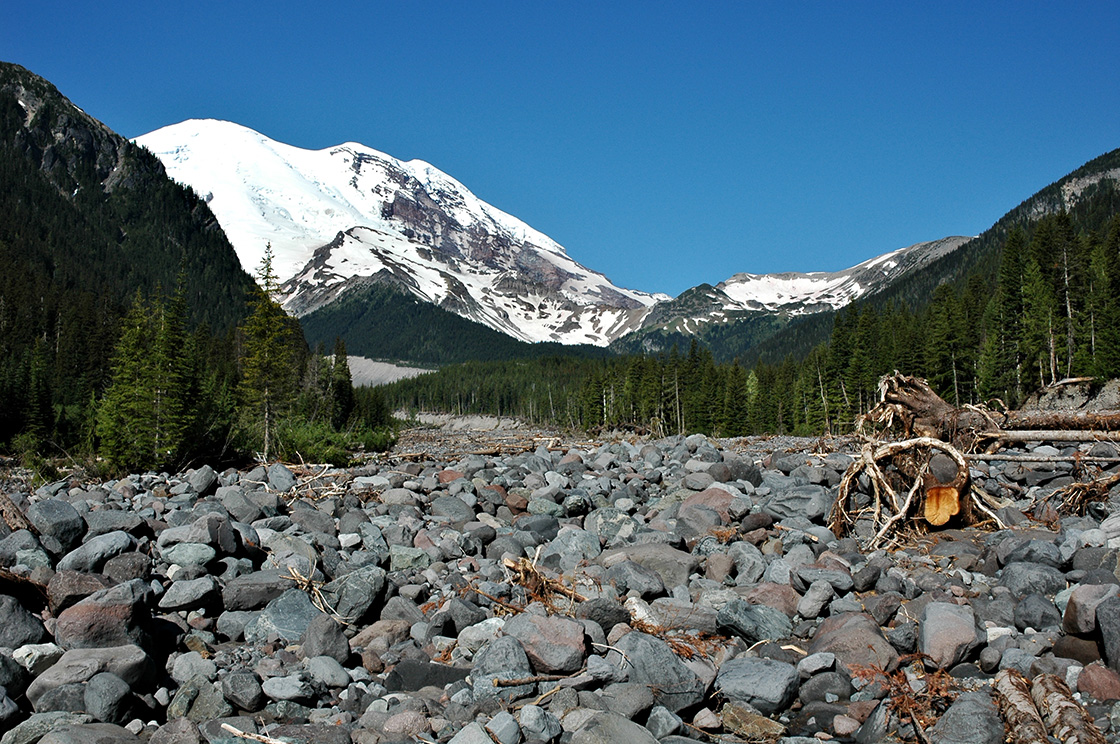
The dry gravel bed of the White River floodplain near the campground in Mount Rainier National Park.

The source of the White River is the Emmons Glacier on the northeast side of Mount Rainier. The river flows from ice caves at the toe of the glacier. Its upper reach is contained within Mount Rainier National Park. Shortly after emerging from the Emmons Glacier, the White River flows generally east, by the White River Campground, then the White River Ranger Station, after which it turns north. The river is paralleled by much of its upper course by State Route 410, called the Mather Memorial Parkway in the national park. After several miles the river exits Mount Rainier National Park and enters Mount Baker-Snoqualmie National Forest.

The river turns gradually westward, passing several national forest campgrounds. Huckleberry Creek joins just below The Dalles Campground. Several miles downriver from there the White River is joined by one of its main tributaries, the West Fork White River, which also originates at a glacier in Mount Rainier National Park, in this case, Winthrop Glacier. A few miles downriver from the West Fork confluence another major tributary joins, the Greenwater River. The small settlement of Greenwater is located at the confluence.

Below Greenwater, the White River flows generally west. It passes Federation Forest State Park and is then joined by another tributary, the Clearwater River. Several miles downriver from there the White River is impounded by Mud Mountain Dam, which creates a marshy intermittent lake called Mud Mountain Lake. The dam was built for flood control purposes. Mud Mountain Lake only fills with water during conditions of exceptionally high stream flow.

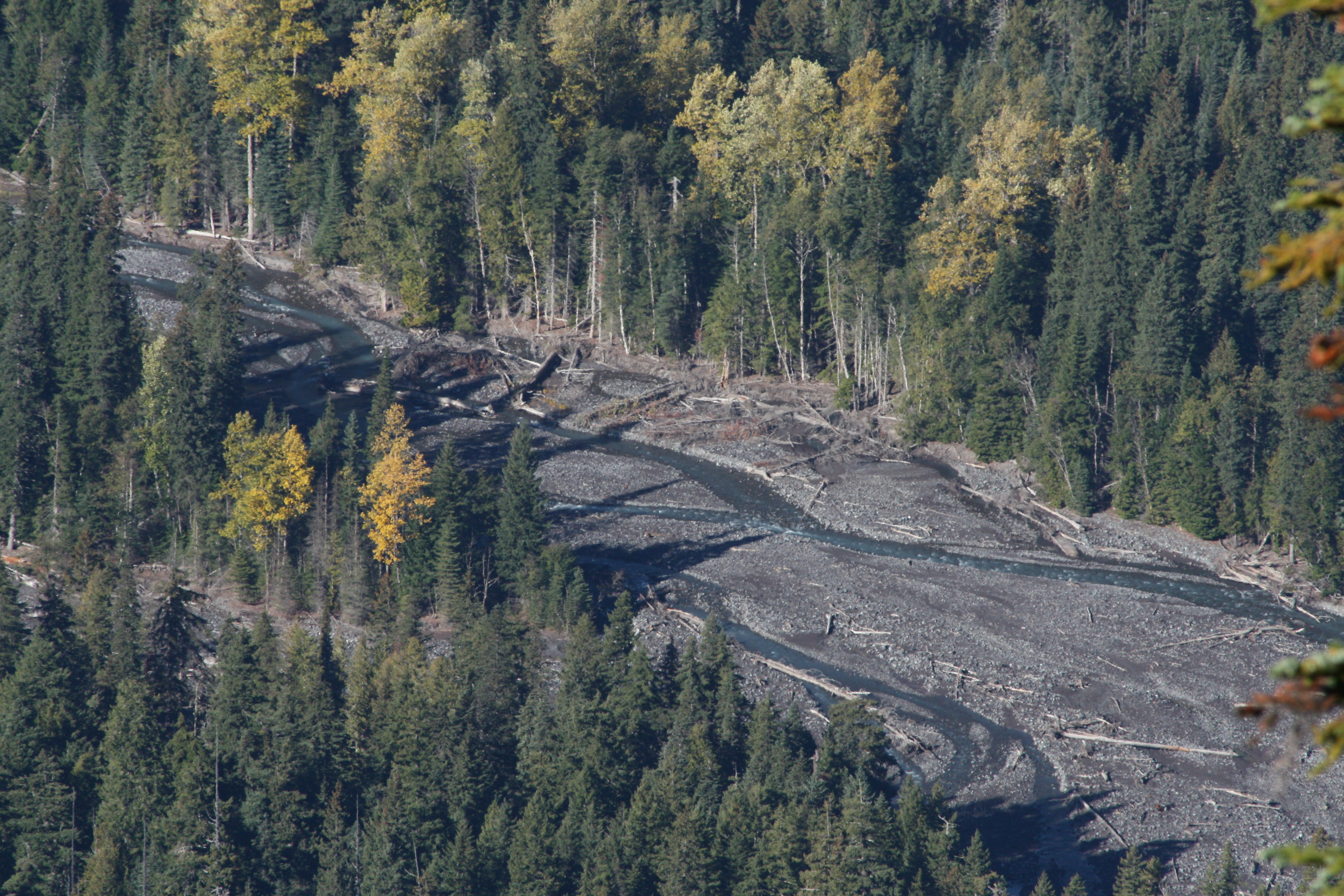
The White River exhibits braided river and meander behavior with coarse woody debris deposited on extensive gravel bars. Populus trichocarpa, with its brilliant yellow fall foliage, grows alongside in the Abies amabilis forest.

Below Mud Mountain Dam the White River enters the greater Tacoma metropolitan area. It flows between the cities of Buckley and Enumclaw, after which it makes a large bend northwest and then southwest, essentially flowing around Lake Tapps. North of the lake, the White River flows through the Muckleshoot Indian Reservation. Below that, to the west of Lake Tapps, the White River enters a broad floodplain and flows past the city of Pacific before emptying into the Puyallup River at Sumner.

Lake Tapps is a reservoir created in 1911 for hydroelectric purposes. A diversion dam near Buckley taps the White River's water, sending a portion of it through a flume, a canal, and a pipeline to Lake Tapps. An outlet canal on the west side of the lake routes water through the turbines of the Dieringer Powerhouse, after which the water is returned to the lower White River (or Stuck River as it is locally called in this area) via the Dieringer "tailrace".

== River modifications ==
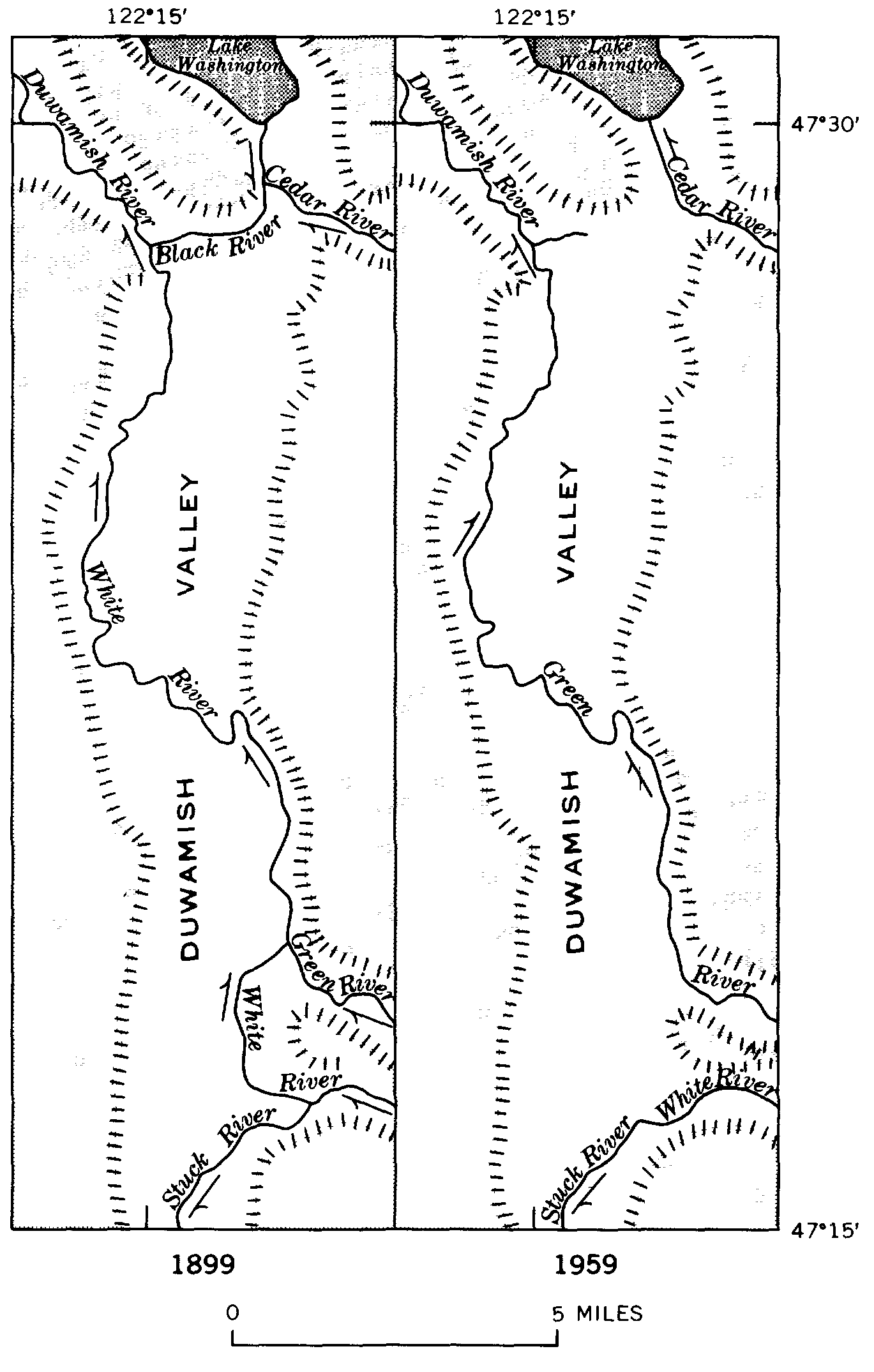
Maps showing the changes of course and nomenclature of rivers in the Duwamish Valley, 1899-1959.

Before 1906, the White River joined the Green River near Auburn, and the combined river (under the name "White") joined the Black River at Tukwila, forming the Duwamish River, which emptied into Elliott Bay at Seattle. In 1906, a great flood coupled with a large log and debris jam diverted the White River southward into the Stuck River thence into the Puyallup River, which empties into Commencement Bay at Tacoma. The debris dam was replaced with a permanent diversion wall. Thus the White River remains a tributary of the Puyallup River today.

In the late 19th century farmers along the White River were subjected to nearly annual floods. Sometimes farmers would use dynamite to divert the river into different channels. In 1899 one such explosion went awry and ended up diverting most of the White River into the Stuck River, thence the Puyallup. Dynamiting the river channels continued until the major flood of 1906 which ended up sending the entire White River down the Stuck River. Because of the risk of floods, the diversion was not wanted by Pierce County, which sued King County in an attempt to have the White River rediverted away from the Stuck River. The lawsuit dragged on for years until 1913 when the two counties reached an agreement. Pierce County would keep the White River, but King County would pay 60% of the cost of flood control. Dams, levees, and barriers were built along the White River in hopes of preventing major flooding, but in 1933 a large flood inundated the region. The two counties realized they were unable to tame the river and so turned to the federal government. The result was Mud Mountain Dam.

Mud Mountain Dam, built by the United States Army Corps of Engineers for flood control purposes, was completed in 1948. The dam blocks anadromous fish passage, so a "trap and haul" system is used, in which fish are transported around the dam by truck. After Mud Mountain Dam was built, the farmers of the lower White River were freed from the previously near-constant worry about flooding.

In 1911 a diversion dam was built near Buckley which, along with a system of dikes around the originally small Lake Tapps, created a larger reservoir. Over the years a small community has developed around the lake. The reservoir's water is returned to the White River about 20 miles (32 km) downstream from the diversion dam. Ownership and operation was transferred to Puget Sound Energy. Recently, Puget Sound Energy sold the lake to Cascade Water Alliance (CWA). CWA is currently undergoing environmental studies intending to use the lake as a drinking water source. The lake has also been the focus of water quality issues through a planning process identified in the Pierce County "White River Basin Plan", adopted November 26, 2013.

== Natural history ==
The White River and its tributaries provide habitat for salmon species including chinook, pink, chum, and coho salmon, as well as bull, rainbow, steelhead, and coastal cutthroat trout. Pink and chum salmon dominate the runs. Although no large natural lakes occur in the basin, sockeye salmon are also present in very small numbers. The White River coho salmon are a mixed population of hatchery and wild fish. The Puget Sound chinook salmon evolutionary significant unit (2005), the Puget Sound steelhead distinct population segment (2011), and Puget Sound/Coastal bull trout (1998) are listed as threatened under the Endangered Species Act.

== History ==
The White River valley was the scene of violent clashes between Native Americans and the militias of Washington Territory as well as the U.S. Army during the Puget Sound War of 1855-1856. Volunteer US troops were ambushed while on their way to work on a construction project near a ferry across the river in the last altercation in the war.

== See also ==
- List of Washington rivers
