= Algona, Washington =

- City
- Flag Seal
- Nickname: City of the Great Blue Heron
- Location of Algona, Washington

- Location within Washington (state) Location within the United States
- Coordinates: 47.281987°N 122.250467°W
- Country: United States
- State: Washington
- County: King
- Incorporated: August 22, 1955

Government
  - Type: Mayor–council
  - Mayor: Troy Linnell
  - Council Member: Bill Thomas; Lynda Osborn; Tim Fairley; Gordon Cook; David White

Area
  - Total: 1.292 sq mi (3.346 km^{2})
  - Land: 1.292 sq mi (3.346 km^{2})
  - Water: 0 sq mi (0.000 km^{2}) 0.0%
- Elevation: 75 ft (23 m)

Population (2020)
  - Total: 3,290
  - Estimate (2024): 3,269
  - Density: 2,530.7/sq mi (977.11/km^{2})
- Time zone: UTC−8 (Pacific (PST))
  - Summer (DST): UTC−7 (PDT)
- ZIP Code: 98001
- Area code: 253
- FIPS code: 53-01290
- GNIS feature ID: 2409680
- Website: algonawa.gov

Algona (/ælˈɡoʊnə/) is a city in King County, Washington, United States, and the Seattle metropolitan area, surrounded by the suburbs of Auburn to the north and east, Pacific to the south, and unincorporated King County to the west. The population was 3,290 at the 2020 census, and was estimated at 3,269 in 2024.

== History ==
The community was originally called "Algoma". (A recording error by postal officials accounts for the error in spelling, which was never corrected.)

Algona was officially incorporated on August 22, 1955.

== Events ==
Every year Algona has a city-run festival called "Algona Days". The event includes an assortment of food vendors, lawn mower racing, small rides, live music and other events.

== Geography ==
According to the United States Census Bureau, the city has a total area of 1.292 square miles (3.35 km^{2}), all land.

== Demographics ==
Historical population
Census	Pop.	Note	%±
1960	1,311		—
1970	1,276		−2.7%
1980	1,467		15.0%
1990	1,694		15.5%
2000	2,460		45.2%
2010	3,014		22.5%
2020	3,290		9.2%
2024 (est.)	3,269		−0.6%
U.S. Decennial Census; 2020 Census

The typical home for sale in Algona was built in 1981, which is about the same age as the typical home for sale in Washington.

As of the 2024 American Community Survey, there were 930 estimated households in Algona with an average of 3.5 persons per household. The city had a median household income of $84,583, and approximately 11.5% of the population lived at or below the poverty line. Algona had an estimated 60.4% employment rate, with 15.5% of the population holding a bachelor's degree or higher and 75.8% holding a high school diploma.

=== Racial and ethnic composition ===
Algona, Washington – racial and ethnic composition Note: the US Census treats Hispanic/Latino as an ethnic category. This table excludes Latinos from the racial categories and assigns them to a separate category. Hispanics/Latinos may be of any race.
Race / ethnicity (NH = non-Hispanic)	Pop. 1980	Pop. 1990	Pop. 2000	Pop. 2010	Pop. 2020
White alone (NH)	1,372 (93.52%)	1,505 (88.84%)		1,843 (61.15%)	1,687 (51.28%)
Black or African American alone (NH)	5 (0.34%)	14 (0.83%)		96 (3.19%)	
Native American or Alaska Native alone (NH)	—	46 (2.72%)		37 (1.23%)	
Asian alone (NH)	—	49 (2.89%)		349 (11.58%)	
Pacific Islander alone (NH)	—	—		60 (1.99%)	
Other race alone (NH)	71 (4.84%)	5 (0.30%)		3 (0.10%)	
Mixed race or multiracial (NH)	—	—		148 (4.91%)	
Hispanic or Latino (any race)	19 (1.30%)	75 (4.43%)	147 (5.98%)	478 (15.86%)	619 (18.81%)
Total	1,467 (100.00%)	1,694 (100.00%)	2,460 (100.00%)	3,014 (100.00%)	3,290 (100.00%)

=== 2020 census ===
As of the 2020 census, there were 3,290 people and 1,013 households in Algona. The median age was 36.6 years, with 24.3% of residents under the age of 18 and 11.2% aged 65 or older. For every 100 females, there were 104.9 males, and for every 100 females age 18 and over there were 104.4 males.

The population density was 2,546.44 inhabitants per square mile (983.2/km^{2}). There were 1,048 housing units at an average density of 811.15 per square mile (313.2/km^{2}); 3.3% were vacant, the homeowner vacancy rate was 0.4%, and the rental vacancy rate was 1.8%. Of the 1,013 households, 39.7% had children under the age of 18 living in them, 53.7% were married-couple households, 20.7% were households with a male householder and no spouse or partner present, 18.3% were households with a female householder and no spouse or partner present, 15.3% were made up of individuals, and 6.2% had someone living alone who was 65 years of age or older.

100.0% of residents lived in urban areas, while 0.0% lived in rural areas.

Racial composition as of the 2020 census
Race	Number	Percent
White	1,795	54.6%
Black or African American	146	4.4%
American Indian and Alaska Native	68	2.1%
Asian	488	14.8%
Native Hawaiian and Other Pacific Islander	51	1.6%
Some other race	345	10.5%
Two or more races	397	12.1%
Hispanic or Latino (of any race)	619	18.8%

=== 2010 census ===
As of the 2010 census, there were 3,014 people, 953 households, and 722 families living in the city. The population density was 2,336.4 inhabitants per square mile (902.1/km^{2}). There were 1,018 housing units at an average density of 789.1 per square mile (304.7/km^{2}). The racial makeup of the city was 67.05% White, 3.25% African American, 1.73% Native American, 11.68% Asian, 1.99% Pacific Islander, 7.50% from some other races and 6.80% from two or more races. Hispanic or Latino people of any race were 15.86% of the population.

There were 953 households, of which 46.5% had children under the age of 18 living with them, 54.6% were married couples living together, 12.1% had a female householder with no husband present, 9.1% had a male householder with no wife present, and 24.2% were non-families. 17.0% of all households were made up of individuals, and 3.8% had someone living alone who was 65 years of age or older. The average household size was 3.15 and the average family size was 3.49.

The median age in the city was 33.1 years. 28.4% of residents were under the age of 18; 10.4% were between the ages of 18 and 24; 27.2% were from 25 to 44; 27.3% were from 45 to 64; and 6.5% were 65 years of age or older. The gender makeup of the city was 50.8% male and 49.2% female.

=== 2000 census ===
As of the 2000 census, there were 2,460 people, 845 households, and 643 families living in the city. The population density was 1,827.6 inhabitants per square mile (705.6/km^{2}). There were 878 housing units at an average density of 652.3 per square mile (251.9/km^{2}). The racial makeup of the city was 84.80% White, 1.67% African American, 1.87% Native American, 5.93% Asian, 0.12% Pacific Islander, 2.28% from some other races and 3.33% from two or more races. Hispanic or Latino people of any race were 5.98% of the population.

There were 845 households, out of which 43.3% had children under the age of 18 living with them, 56.4% were married couples living together, 11.7% had a female householder with no husband present, and 23.8% were non-families. 18.6% of all households were made up of individuals, and 3.8% had someone living alone who was 65 years of age or older. The average household size was 2.91 and the average family size was 3.29.

In the city, the age distribution of the population shows 30.7% under the age of 18, 6.8% from 18 to 24, 36.6% from 25 to 44, 19.6% from 45 to 64, and 6.3% who were 65 years of age or older. The median age was 34 years. For every 100 females, there were 107.6 males. For every 100 females age 18 and over, there were 104.8 males.

The median income for a household in the city was $50,833, and the median income for a family was $52,462. Males had a median income of $40,450 versus $28,370 for females. The per capita income for the city was $19,734. About 3.2% of families and 4.5% of the population were below the poverty line, including 3.7% of those under age 18 and 10.4% of those age 65 or over.

== Politics ==
Presidential Elections Results
Year	Republican	Democratic	Third Parties
2020	45.38% 599	52.65% 635	1.97% 26

As of the 2004 presidential election, Algona consists of three voting precincts. All three gave pluralities to Democrat John Kerry, although only one (which consists the southern half of the city) gave him a majority. However, the remaining precinct was sufficiently Democratic to give Kerry a moderate majority overall. The 2004 Presidential results were as follows.

- John F. Kerry (Democrat) – 509 (51.41%)
- George W. Bush (Republican) – 458 (46.26%)
- Ralph Nader (Independent) – 15 (1.52%)
- Other candidates and write-ins – 8 (0.81%)

== Economy ==
Tim's Cascade Snacks is headquartered in Algona and has a processing plant in the city that employs 80 people.
