= Stuck River (Washington) =

River in the United States

Coordinates: 47°12′09″N 122°15′00″W

The Stuck River in Washington state is a former small stream turned distributary and later final course of the White River, near Auburn to the Puyallup River at Sumner. The river's name comes from the Lushootseed word /stəq/, "log jam", or /stəx̌ʷ/, "gouged through", or "plowed through".

Throughout the late 19th century, farmers in the valley attempted various flood control efforts that eventually allowed the White River to partially flow into the Stuck River in 1899. In 1906, a great flood diverted the White River's entire flow into the Stuck River. The entire length of the former Stuck is now considered the final reach of the White River, though the Stuck River name still appears on many maps, in local place names, and in legal descriptions of property near the river.

== See also ==
- List of rivers in Washington
