= Clark Lake =

Clark Lake may refer to:

- Clark Lake (Jackson County, Michigan)
- Clark Lake (Gogebic County, Michigan)
- Clark Lake (Kent, Washington)
- Clark Lake (Stevens County, Washington)
- Clark Lake (Door County, Wisconsin)
- a lake in Scott County, Minnesota
- Clark/Lake station
