= Door to Door =

Door to Door may refer to:

== Business ==
- Door-to-door, a sales technique
- Door to Door Storage, a U.S. self-storage company

== Film and television ==
- Door to Door (film), a 2002 American TV movie about salesman Bill Porter, played by William H. Macy
- Door to Door (1985 film), an American film with cinematography by Reed Smoot
- "Door to Door" (Beavis and Butt-head), an episode of Beavis and Butt-head
- "Door to Door" (Invader Zim), an episode of Invader Zim
- "Door to Door" (Modern Family), an episode of Modern Family

== Music ==
- Door to Door (album) or the title song, by The Cars, 1987
- Door to Door, a compilation album by Albert King
- "Door to Door", a song by Creedence Clearwater Revival from Mardi Gras
- "Door to Door", a song by FireHouse from Prime Time
