= Robert Morris Earthwork =

Coordinates: 47.407501°N 122.283607°W

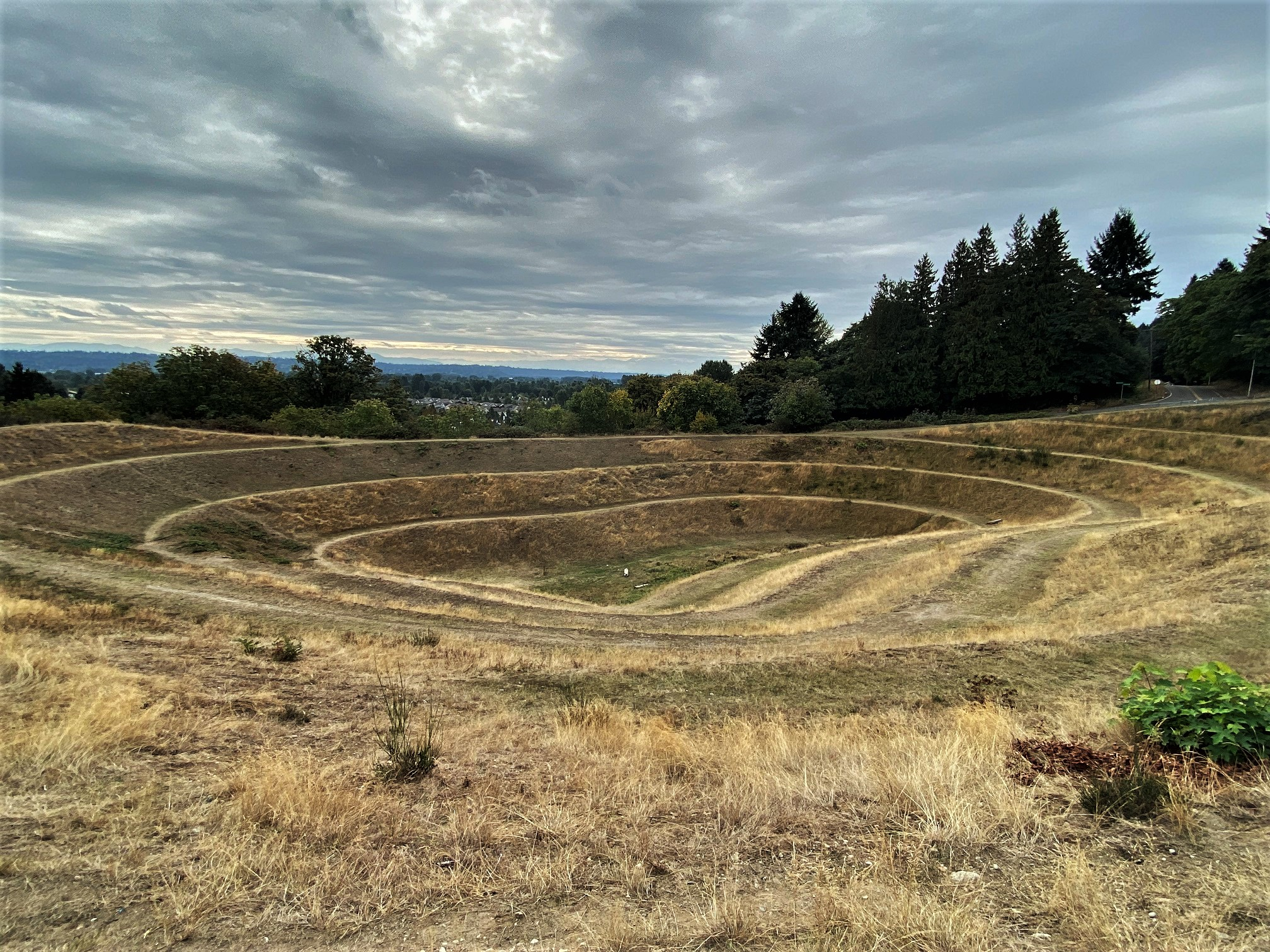
Untitled Earthwork-Johnson Pit #30 Completed by Robert Morris in 1979 on the site of an abandoned 3.7 acre gravel pit. South view.

The Robert Morris Earthwork is a 1979 public art earthworks installation in Seatac, Washington by Robert Morris. The area surrounding the piece, a former gravel pit overlooking the Kent Valley outside of Seattle, has been rapidly filled in with urban growth, leading to efforts to both protect it and to enhance public access and enjoyment. The earthwork was the result of a King County government symposium titled Earthworks: Land Reclamation as Sculpture. The same symposium also gave impetus to the creation of the Mill Creek Canyon Earthworks. According to the former director of public art for the city and county, the two pieces are the major earthworks in King County. According to 4Culture, the piece is of "international importance". The site was listed on the National Register of Historic Places in 2021.
