= X10 =

X10 may refer to:

- North American X-10, an unmanned technology demonstrator for advanced missile technologies
- SL X10, a Swedish suburban train
- X10 industry standard, communication over wired power line or wireless used for home automation
  - X10 Wireless Technology, a vendor of home automation products
- X-10, a code name for the Metallurgical Project
  - X-10 Graphite Reactor, one of the world's first nuclear reactors
- Sony Ericsson Xperia X10, a smartphone using the Android operating system
- X10 (video game), a video game by Warthog Games Limited
- X Ten, a gene-sequencing machine in the HiSeq series produced by the San Diego–based biotech firm Illumina
- Fujifilm X10, a digital compact camera from 2011
- Skydio X10 autonomous drone

== Computer related ==
- X10 programming language
- Microsoft X10 Event, a Microsoft conference demonstrating Xbox 360 games/technologies for 2010 on 11 February 2010
- X Window System, 10th protocol version from 1986 to 1988
