= Fenwick (fishing) =

Fenwick is a brand name of Pure Fishing.

Fenwick is named after Lake Fenwick in Kent, Washington where 5 Seattle businessmen founded the company in 1952. Fenwick was an early pioneer in the use of fiberglass blanks to create fishing rods that were corrosive resistant to salt water and that quickly replaced metal and traditional wood and bamboo fishing rods for their durability and ease of maintenance.

Fenwick was purchased by Phil Clock and moved to Westminster, California in 1968 and focused on the fishing rod needs of Bass fisherman.

Fenwick was the first to market with an all graphite fishing rod in 1973.

Both Fenwick's fiberglass and graphite fishing rods led fisherman to innovate new ways to fish using the unique material properties of Fenwick fishing rods.
