= Mill Creek Canyon Earthworks =

Public park, dam, and piece of art in Kent, Washington

Mill Creek Earthworks Park
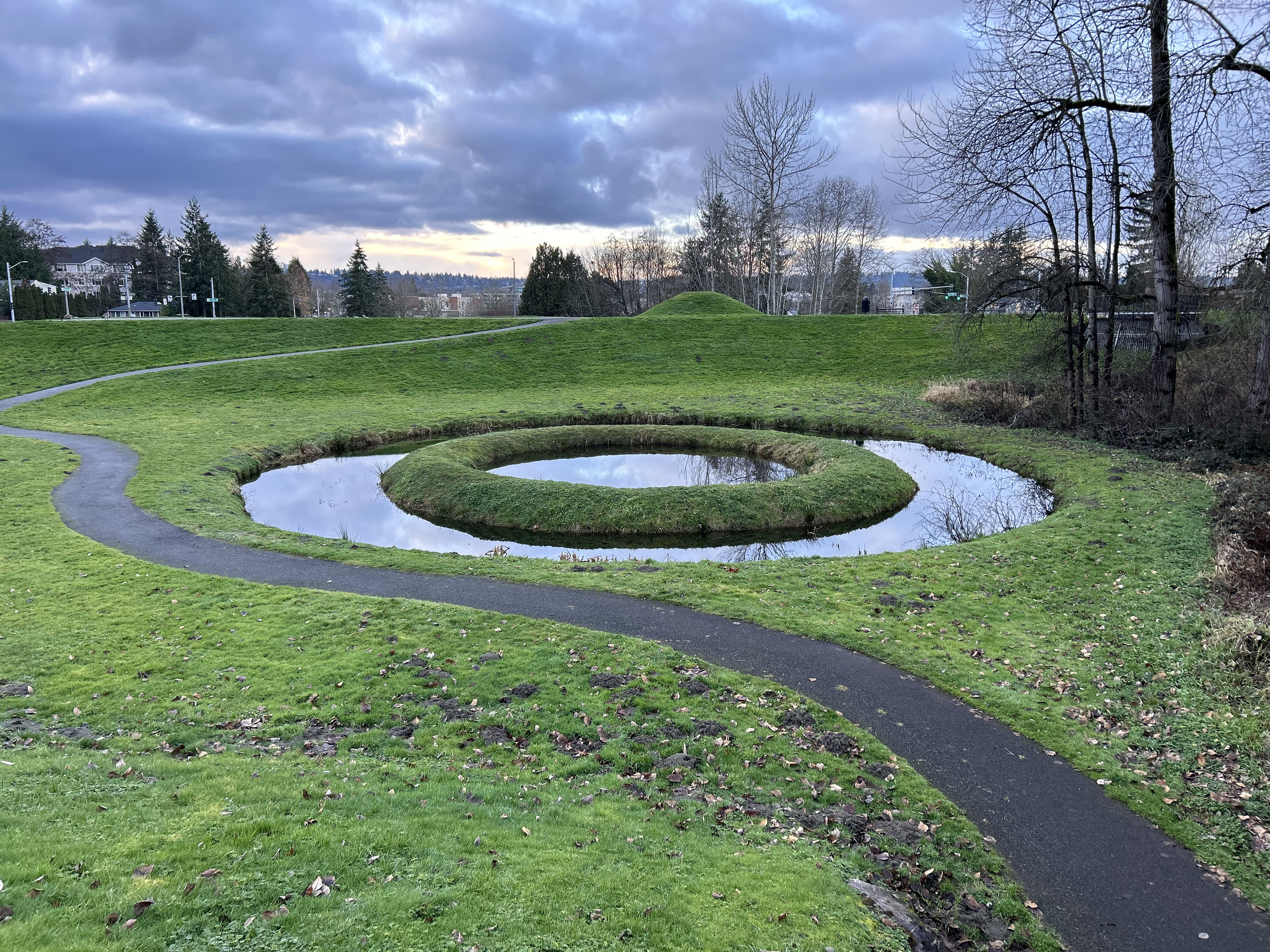
- Interactive map of Mill Creek Earthworks Park
- Type: Public park
- Location: Kent, Washington, Washington, United States
- Coordinates: 47°22′59″N 122°13′26″W
- Area: 2.5 acres (1.0 ha)
- Created: 1982
- Status: Open
- Website: http://kentwa.gov/content.aspx?id=11914

The Mill Creek Canyon Earthworks is a public park, storm water detention dam and Modernist "masterpiece" of environmental art located in Kent, Washington, United States. The earthworks was created by Bauhaus artist Herbert Bayer in 1982 and designated a landmark by King County Landmarks Commission in 2008. The earthworks site covers 2.5 acres (1.0 ha).

In 2008, the earthworks was upgraded to handle a 10,000-year flood by raising the dam approximately 2 feet (0.61 m).

== See also ==
- Robert Morris Earthwork
