= Simon Peter Randolph =

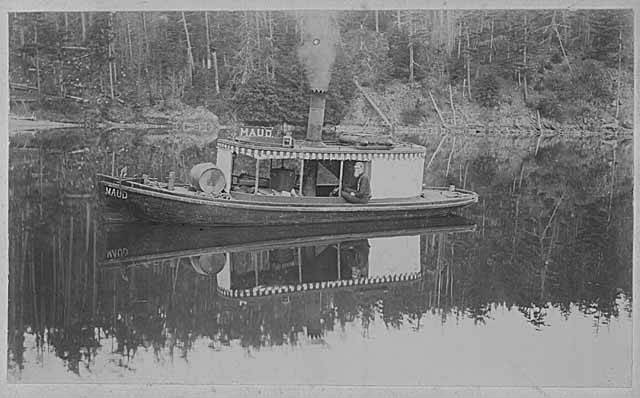

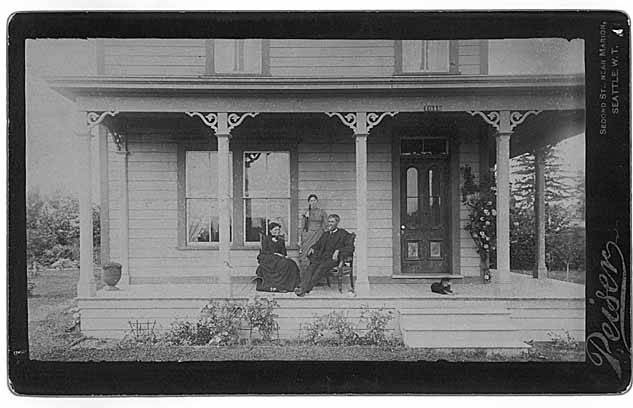
The Randolph family in front of their house on Columbia Street in 1888

Simon Peter Randolph (January 10, 1835 – January 15, 1909) was a pioneer steamboat captain in the Kent Valley near Seattle, Washington. He was born in Logan County, Illinois to Brooks Randolph and Susan Dotson. His daughter's name was Edith. He went into business with his son-in-law.

His obituary states that he came to Seattle in 1868 and "...was engaged in transporting coal for the Lake Washington Coal Company..."

"In 1871, a new entry joined the growing competition for the White River transportation trade. Captain Simon Peter Randolph had been active in boating on the Duwamish and Black Rivers and Lake Washington since 1868, and was responsible for dredging much of the lower White River, clearing it of many logs and snags."

At first the round trip took four days, gradually he dredged the river clearing it of snags. He also cleared the Black River between its outlet and the Duwamish River.
