= Omax Corporation =

American water jet system manufacturer

OMAX Corporation
- Industry: Industrial Water Jet machinery
- Founded: 1993
- Headquarters: Kent, Washington
- Key people: Dr. John Cheung, CEO & Founder; Dr. John H. Olsen, VP of Operations & Co-Founder
- Number of employees: 240
- Website: http://www.omax.com/

OMAX Corporation is a large American provider of multi-axis (the ability to cut non-flat objects) water jet systems for use in the fabrication and manufacturing industry. It is the largest water jet machining company in the United States of America. The company was acquired by Hypertherm in 2019.

== History ==
OMAX was established in 1993 by Dr. John Cheung and Dr. John Olsen. They made high-pressure abrasive jet machining (a machining and fabrication process using a mixture of strong abrasives and liquid propelled by a high velocity gas) to erode material to form intricate shapes or specific edge shapes.

== Aviation High School Robotics ==
Each year OMAX sponsors the FIRST Robotics Competition team from Aviation High School. OMAX supervises the Aviation "Skunkworks" Team as members cut parts for their robot at OMAX's headquarters. The Aviation High Robotics team won the Creativity Award at the FIRST Championship held in St. Louis, Missouri in April 2011.

== Competitors ==
OMAX's largest competitor is Flow International Corp. To avoid competition Flow International attempted to buy OMAX for $109 million, but because of the downturn in the economy, the offer was reduced to $75 million. In 2009 it was announced that Flow called off the merger stating "We believe that our path forward alone is far superior to one combined with OMAX at the wrong price". John Olsen co-founder of OMAX stated that had the companies merged there would have certainly been layoffs. Other competitors include Jet Edge Waterjets, and ESAB Cutting Products.

== See also ==
- Water jet cutter
