= Hypertherm =

Hypertherm Associates
- Type: Private (employee-owned)
- Industry: Industrial equipment
- Founded: 1968
- Founders: Dick Couch; Bob Dean
- Headquarters: Hanover, New Hampshire, U.S.
- Key people: Aaron Brandt (CEO)
- Products: Plasma cutting systems, waterjet cutting systems, CNC controls, CAD/CAM software, laser and plasma consumables
- Number of employees: ~2,000 (2024)
- Website: www.hypertherm.com

Hypertherm Associates is an American manufacturer of industrial cutting systems headquartered in Hanover, New Hampshire. Founded in 1968 by Dick Couch and Bob Dean following their invention of water-injection plasma-arc cutting, the company designs and manufactures plasma and waterjet cutting systems, along with CNC controls, software, and laser and plasma consumables used in industries including shipbuilding, manufacturing, and automotive repair. Since January 2014 the company has been 100% owned by its employees through an employee stock ownership plan.

== History ==
=== Founding ===
The technology that spawned Hypertherm was crafted in 1968 in New Hampshire, by Dick Couch and Bob Dean, who was Couch's former professor at Dartmouth College. The pair invented and later patented water-injection cutting, which injects water into a plasma cutting nozzle, producing a cutting arc with temperatures estimated at nine times the surface of the sun. From a workshop in Etna, New Hampshire, Couch and Dean started the company as a subsidiary of Dean's company, Creare. In early 1971, Couch bought control of Hypertherm, moving the equipment and a few employees into a garage behind the Creare building. By 1975, the company bought out its small cadre of investors.

=== Growth and acquisition ===
A 25th-anniversary profile in 1993 described the company with over $30 million in annual revenues, with 325 employees, a 65,000-square-foot building in Hanover, New Hampshire, and 25 to 35 patents granted or in process. At that time, 40 percent of the company's revenue came from overseas sales. Couch recalled that when he started Hypertherm he thought improving plasma cutting technology would take two or three years -- "twenty-five years later, he's still at it." The news profile credited the company's no-layoffs policy and providing stability in the local technology sector during economic downturns.

In October 2018, the company launched Hypertherm Ventures, a corporate venture capital arm investing in robotics, automation, machine learning, additive manufacturing, and the industrial internet of things. The venture unit was closed in 2026 after more than seven years, with corporate venture activity paused in July 2025 and the portfolio liquidated.

In March 2019 Hypertherm announced a definitive agreement to acquire OMAX Corporation, a Kent, Washington-based manufacturer of abrasive waterjet systems, and the acquisition closed in April 2019. OMAX's 367-employee workforce was kept intact with no consolidations, and both companies' waterjet brands continued.

=== Workplace practices ===
In 2005, The Wall Street Journal used Hypertherm as a case study in team-based management, describing its cross-functional product line teams, profit-sharing practices, workforce structure, and reported business outcomes like lowered employee attrition rates.

During the 2008–2009 recession, Hypertherm maintained its no-layoff policy despite declining sales, redeploying employees to other assignments and training rather than eliminating their positions, according to NPR.

=== Employee ownership ===
The company established an employee stock ownership plan (ESOP) in 2001, initially holding 30% of the company as its primary retirement plan. In January 2014, principals Dick and Barbara Couch transferred their majority interest to the ESOP, making Hypertherm 100% employee-owned; the Couches cited their children's lack of interest in running the company and declined offers to sell it. At the time the company had a 1,400-member workforce; longtime employee Larry Benson, the 14th person hired by the company 35 years earlier, said he had "never imagined" employee ownership when he started.

=== Rebrand ===
In June 2022 the company changed its corporate name to Hypertherm Associates, reflecting its evolution from a plasma-cutting manufacturer to a multi-technology provider organized into four businesses: Hypertherm (plasma), OMAX (waterjet), a software group, and an aftermarket group.

=== Leadership ===
Founder Dick Couch served as CEO from 1968 to 2014. In February 2012 Couch stepped down as president, and longtime Hypertherm executive Evan Smith succeeded him as president, while Couch remained chief executive officer and chairman of the board. Smith, who had joined the company in 1992, then served as CEO from 2015 to 2024. In January 2024 the company announced that Aaron Brandt, executive vice president of technology, would succeed Smith as CEO upon Smith's planned retirement at the end of 2024 -- making Brandt the third CEO in the company's history.

== Products ==
Hypertherm Associates designs and manufactures handheld and mechanized plasma cutting systems, abrasive waterjet systems, CNC motion and torch-height controls, CAD/CAM cutting software, and laser and plasma consumables.

== Corporate social responsibility ==
In its 2020 corporate social responsibility report, the company set goals to become climate neutral by 2030, eliminate 50% of its waste by 2030, and cut carbon emissions from customer use of its products (identified as the company's largest negative environmental impact) by half. The company funds education and workforce-development philanthropy, including its "Spark Something Great" school grants across North America and support for the Plasma Technology Center at Pennsylvania College of Technology.

Hypertherm began a recovery-friendly workplace program in 2015. The Washington Post reported that the company supported employees affected by substance-use disorder through measures including paid community volunteering, recovery-coach training, naloxone training, and temporary light-duty assignments following relapse. In 2023, Fortune described Hypertherm Associates as a pioneer in the recovery-friendly workplace movement and profiled an employee who became chair of the company's substance-use disorder task force.
