= Puget Systems =

Custom computer business

Puget Sound Systems, Inc.
- Trade name: Puget Systems
- Type: Private
- Industry: Computer systems
- Founded: Kent, Washington (2000)
- Founder: Jon Bach
- Headquarters: Auburn, Washington
- Area served: United States
- Website: pugetsystems.com

Puget Sound Systems, Inc., doing business as Puget Systems, is a custom computer business based in Auburn, Washington. It operates primarily through its website, and sell a mixture of custom and preconfigured computers including desktops, workstations, and servers. The business was founded by Jon Bach in 2000.

== History ==
Puget Systems was founded by Jon Bach, a student at the University of Washington, in 2000 under the name Puget Sound Systems. The business was named for the Puget Sound region in which it is located, but the name caused confusion about its services and was changed to Puget Custom Computers for clarity early in the firm's life. In early 2008, it was shortened to Puget Systems.

The company was originally run out of the owner's home, and moved to an industrial warehouse as it grew. Puget Systems is currently located in Auburn, Washington.

== Products ==
For many years, Puget focused on building custom computer systems with an emphasis on quiet performance. During that time, the company catered to home users and gamers as well as specialists who wanted a computer tailored to their needs, such as video editing. Puget offered fans to reduce sound levels, which became its specialty.

Along with custom systems, Puget also sold a range of preconfigured computers, with names indicative of their purpose (e.g., the Deluge was water-cooled and the Genesis was optimized for content creation).

In 2007, Puget built a computer submerged in mineral oil. The project was inspired by similar computers submerged in vegetable oil, which provides very even cooling but has the disadvantages of being translucent yellow and going rancid after a few months. The mineral oil used for this project is clear and does not decay. Oil has a high specific heat capacity, so it takes this computer approximately twelve hours of operation to reach its peak temperature of eighty degrees Celsius. A radiator and pump could be attached to lower the temperature significantly. After more than a year of reported use, the only minor problem indicated was from oil wicking into peripherals and making a mess. While Puget never sold mineral oil computers, it offered a DIY kit and provided a construction tutorial on its website. This kit was discontinued in November 2014 after another company made patent licensing demands.

In the late 2010s, Puget Systems developed in-house benchmark testing for applications such as Adobe After Effects and Blackmagic DaVinci Resolve. This appears to have coincided with a shift away from their earlier focus on customization and gaming, toward selling software-specific workstations for content creation, engineering, and scientific computing.
