= Robert C. Dean Jr. =

American mechanical engineer

- Born: 1928
- Died: January 7, 2023
- Education: Massachusetts Institute of Technology (BS, SM, ScD)
- Occupations: Mechanical engineer, educator, entrepreneur
- Known for: Mechanical design of fluid machinery; serial entrepreneurship
- Spouse: Nancy Dean
- Awards: Fellow, National Academy of Engineering (1977); ASME Robert Henry Thurston Lecture Award (1977); ASME Gold Medal (1966); Fellow, National Academy of Inventors (2015)
- Scientific career
- Fields: Mechanical engineering, fluid machinery
- Workplaces: Thayer School of Engineering, Dartmouth College; MIT; Ingersoll-Rand

Robert C. Dean Jr. (1928 – January 7, 2023) was an American mechanical engineer, educator, entrepreneur, and Professor of Engineering Emeritus at the Thayer School of Engineering, Dartmouth College. He was elected to the National Academy of Engineering (NAE) in 1977 for "contributions to theory and reduction to practice in the field of mechanical design of fluid machinery," and was the recipient of the 1977 American Society of Mechanical Engineers (ASME) Robert Henry Thurston Lecture Award in 1977.

== Education and early career ==
Dean earned BS, SM, and ScD degrees in mechanical engineering at MIT, where he served as an assistant professor in the gas turbine laboratory from 1951 to 1956. He then became head of advanced engineering at Ingersoll-Rand Co., before joining the faculty of the Thayer School of Engineering at Dartmouth College in 1960.

== Career and entrepreneurship ==
An inventor holding more than 28 U.S. patents, Dean was the founder or cofounder of ten companies spanning fields from fluid machinery to biotechnology. These included Creare, a thermal/flow and medical-sciences contract R&D firm, and Hypertherm, which grew into the world's largest manufacturer of plasma-arc metal-cutting equipment. His other ventures included Creare Innovations, Verax, Synosys, Synergy Research Corporation, Synergy Innovations, Simbex, NanoComp Technologies, and Synticos.

== Honors and recognition ==
Dean was elected to the National Academy of Engineering in 1977, the same year he received the ASME Robert Henry Thurston Lecture Award. A Fellow of both ASME and the National Academy of Inventors (elected 2015), he received the ASME Gold Medal (1966). In 1996 the U.S. Small Business Administration awarded him one of the first Tibbett's Pioneer Awards for his contributions to the Small Business Innovation Research (SBIR) program, and in 1998 the New Hampshire High Technology Council named him Entrepreneur of the Year.
