= East Hill-Meridian, Washington =

- Former CDP
- Location of East Hill-Meridian, Washington
- Coordinates: 47°24′38″N 122°10′25″W
- Country: United States
- State: Washington
- County: King

Area
  - Total: 9.0 sq mi (23.2 km^{2})
  - Land: 8.9 sq mi (23.1 km^{2})
  - Water: 0.039 sq mi (0.1 km^{2})
- Elevation: 505 ft (154 m)

Population (2010)
  - Total: 29,878
  - Density: 3,282/sq mi (1,267.3/km^{2})
- Time zone: UTC-8 (Pacific (PST))
  - Summer (DST): UTC-7 (PDT)
- FIPS code: 53-19515
- GNIS feature ID: 2408709

East Hill-Meridian is a former census-designated place (CDP) in King County, Washington. The population was 29,878 at the time of the 2010 census. The majority of the census area is now within the limits of Kent and Renton.

== Geography ==
According to the United States Census Bureau, the CDP has a total area of 9.0 square miles (23.2 km^{2}), of which, 8.9 square miles (23.1 km^{2}) of it is land and 0.04 square miles (0.1 km^{2}) of it (0.45%) is water.

== Demographics ==
Historical population
Census	Pop.	Note	%±
1990	42,696		—
2000	29,308		−31.4%
2010	29,878		1.9%

As of the census of 2000, there were 29,308 people, 9,845 households, and 7,856 families residing in the CDP. The population density was 3,282.4 people per square mile (1,267.2/km^{2}). There were 10,084 housing units at an average density of 1,129.4/sq mi (436.0/km^{2}). The racial makeup of the CDP was 73.41% White, 4.65% African American, 0.60% Native American, 14.54% Asian, 0.65% Pacific Islander, 1.70% from other races, and 4.44% from two or more races. Hispanic or Latino of any race were 3.81% of the population.

There were 9,845 households, out of which 44.1% had children under the age of 18 living with them, 65.7% were married couples living together, 9.8% had a female householder with no husband present, and 20.2% were non-families. 15.1% of all households were made up of individuals, and 3.8% had someone living alone who was 65 years of age or older. The average household size was 2.97 and the average family size was 3.31.

In the CDP, the population was spread out, with 30.3% under the age of 18, 6.9% from 18 to 24, 32.5% from 25 to 44, 23.1% from 45 to 64, and 7.3% who were 65 years of age or older. The median age was 35 years. For every 100 females, there were 99.4 males. For every 100 females age 18 and over, there were 97.6 males.

The median income for a household in the CDP was $65,721, and the median income for a family was $70,598. Males had a median income of $49,623 versus $35,241 for females. The per capita income for the CDP was $23,621. About 3.6% of families and 4.4% of the population were below the poverty line, including 5.9% of those under age 18 and 2.7% of those age 65 or over.

== Politics ==
On the national level, East Hill-Meridian leans toward the Democratic Party, delivering John Kerry a victory with 54 percent of the vote in the 2004 presidential election to Republican George W. Bush's 45 percent.
