= Novara (company) =

Bicycle brand

Novara headbadge consists of a lower case n in a circle.

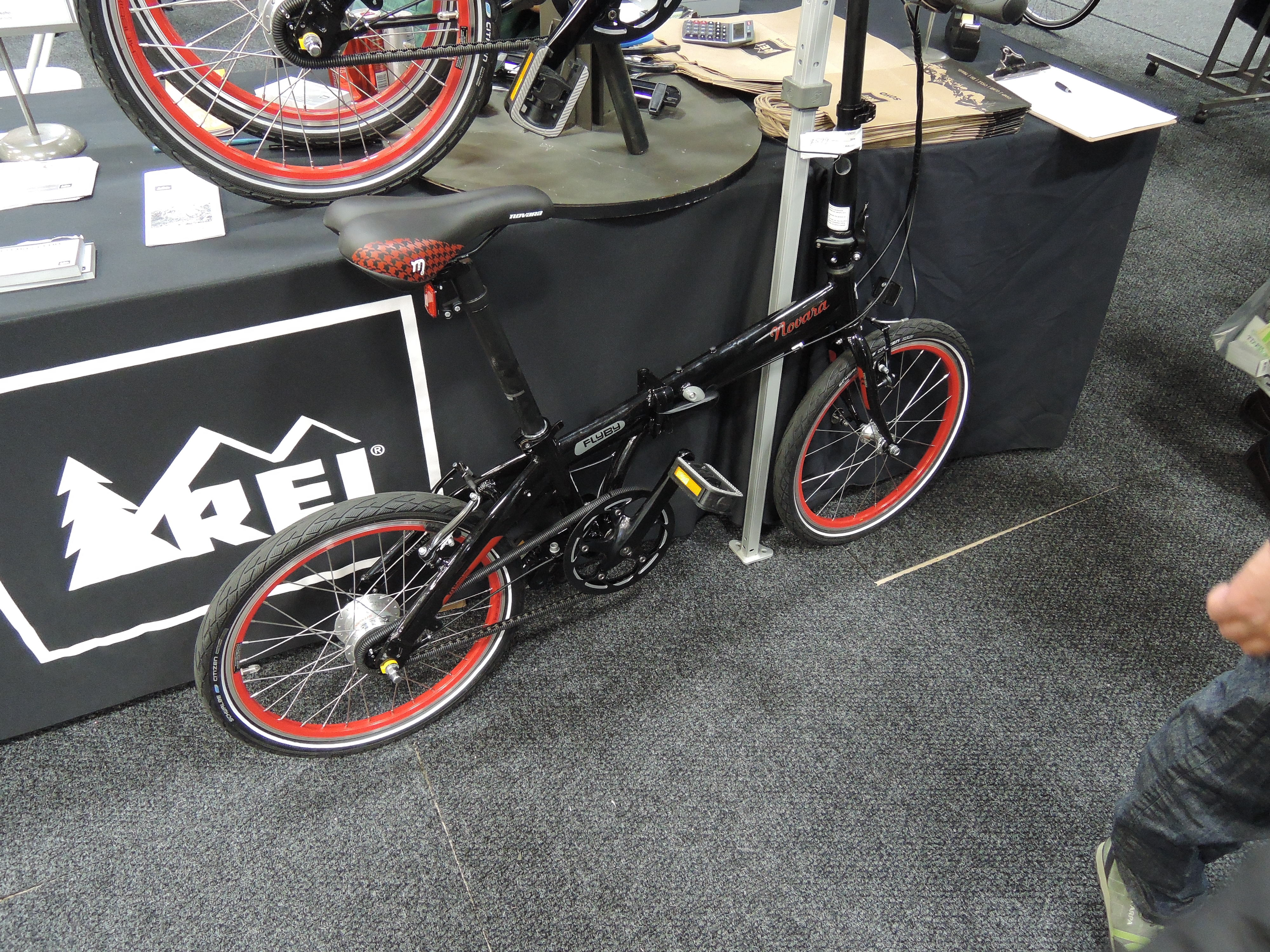
Flyby Novara folding bike

Novara, was the private label brand of bicycles, apparel and bicycle accessories, that was exclusively available through the consumer cooperative REI. The brand was introduced in 1983 and was headquartered in Kent, Washington. Novara bikes are designed in house; outsourced for manufacturing, then finished by REI.

The Novara brand was also used for REI's line of cycling clothing and accessories.

Since 2008, REI has settled both in and out of court with an undisclosed number of individuals who suffered injuries while riding Novara bicycles.

In 2016, REI announced the Novara line would be discontinued.

== Models ==
Types with model amount in parentheses.

- Kids' Bikes (13)
  - Novara Pulse
  - Ponderosa 24"
  - Tractor 24"
  - Moxie 24"
  - Duster 6
  - Pixie 6
  - Duster Single Speed
  - Pixie SS
  - Stinger 16
  - Firefly 16"
  - Stinger 12"
  - Firefly 12"
  - Afterburner SS Single-Speed Trailer Bike
- Road Bikes (7)
  - Verita
  - Strada
  - Carema Pro
  - Novara Divano
  - Novara Carema
  - Novara Express
  - Novara Express XX
  - Novara Trionfo
  - Novara Zeno (650C)
- Touring Bikes (2)
  - Randonee
  - Safari
- Recreation bikes (6)
  - Forza
  - Fiona
  - Corsa
  - Mia
  - Jaunt Bike
  - Jaunt XX
- City Bikes (5)
  - E.T.A.
  - Novara Buzz
  - Novara Buzz One
  - Novara Fusion
  - Novara Gotham
  - Novara Transfer
- Mountain Bikes (6)
  - Ponderosa 29
  - Tupelo 29
  - Tupelo 27.5
  - Matador 29
  - Bonanza
  - Bonita
  - Portal
  - Pika
  - Novara Method 1.0
  - Novara Method 2.0
