= Lake Fenwick =

Lake in Kent, Washington

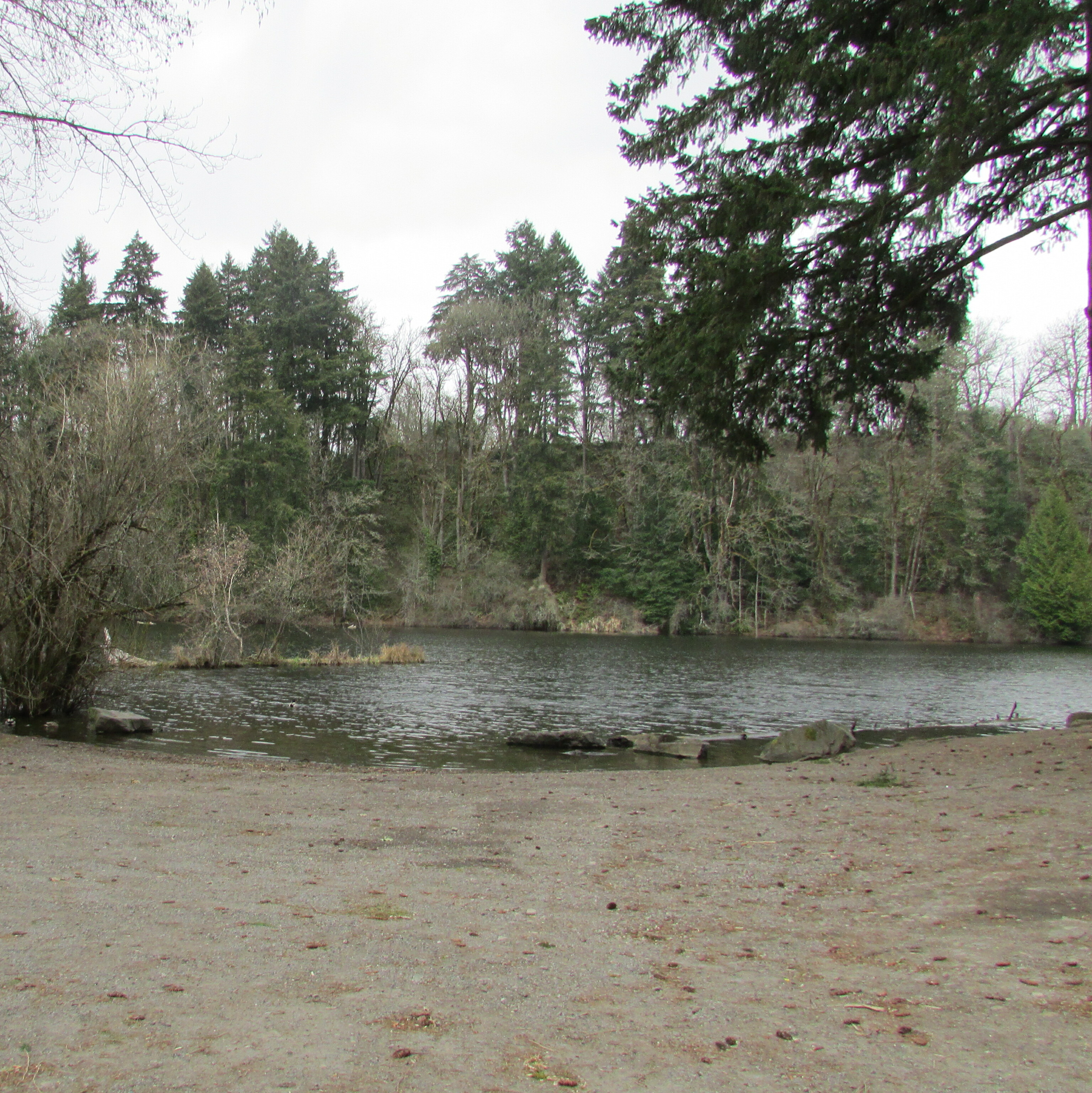
- Lake Fenwick from the public boat launch

- Location within Washington (state) Location within the United States
- Location: Kent, Washington
- Coordinates: 47°21′57″N 122°16′16″W
- Basin countries: United States
- Surface area: 17.20 acres (6.96 ha)
- Max. depth: 31 ft (9.4 m)
- Surface elevation: 119 ft (36 m)

Lake Fenwick is located in King County, Washington, United States, mostly within the city of Kent. The lake is known for its recreational opportunities including fishing and a large public park. The lake has suffered from poor water quality, algae, and infestation by aquatic weeds. Fenwick fishing rods are named after the lake.

== Lake description ==
Lake Fenwick is long and narrow, with a north–south orientation. The lake has a 580-acre (230 ha) watershed, lying almost entirely on its west side. While the lake is 31 feet (9.4 m) deep at its deepest point, it averages only 13 feet (4.0 m) deep.

=== Water quality issues ===
Lake Fenwick has suffered from issues with water quality. The lake has high nutrient concentrations, and is borderline eutrophic. Furthermore, the nitrogen to phosphorus ratio promotes the growth of cyanobacteria, which can cause toxins when present in algal blooms. In August 2018, water quality tests revealed high levels of algal toxins in the lake. This necessitated a closure of Lake Fenwick, and warnings at Lake Fenwick Park. This occurred again in October 2019.

Lake Fenwick also suffers from a large population of invasive Egeria densa, or Brazilian elodea. This plant, classified as a noxious weed in the state of Washington, forms dense mats that harm ecosystems, reduce water quality, and stifle recreational activities.

== Fishing ==
Lake Fenwick is known for fishing. The lake is stocked with rainbow trout annually by the Washington State Department of Fish and Wildlife. Other species naturally present in the lake include black crappie, brown bullhead, largemouth bass, pumpkinseed sunfish, and yellow perch. The Department of Fish and Wildlife also provides a public boat ramp. The city of Kent has a wooden dock for anglers, located within Lake Fenwick Park.

Lake Fenwick is the birthplace of Fenwick fishing rods. The company was founded in 1952, in a garage on the shores of Lake Fenwick.

== Lake Fenwick Park ==
One of the primary attractions at Lake Fenwick is the 140.9-acre (57.0 ha) city-owned Lake Fenwick Park. In addition to its fishing opportunities, the park is also home to a disc golf course and hiking trails. The park is largely forested, making the trails popular for wildlife viewing and nature walks.

The greenbelt surrounding Lake Fenwick continues to the west as West Fenwick Park, a 15-acre (6.1 ha) neighborhood park. The park has a large playground, several sports courts, picnic and grilling areas, and a skate park nearby.

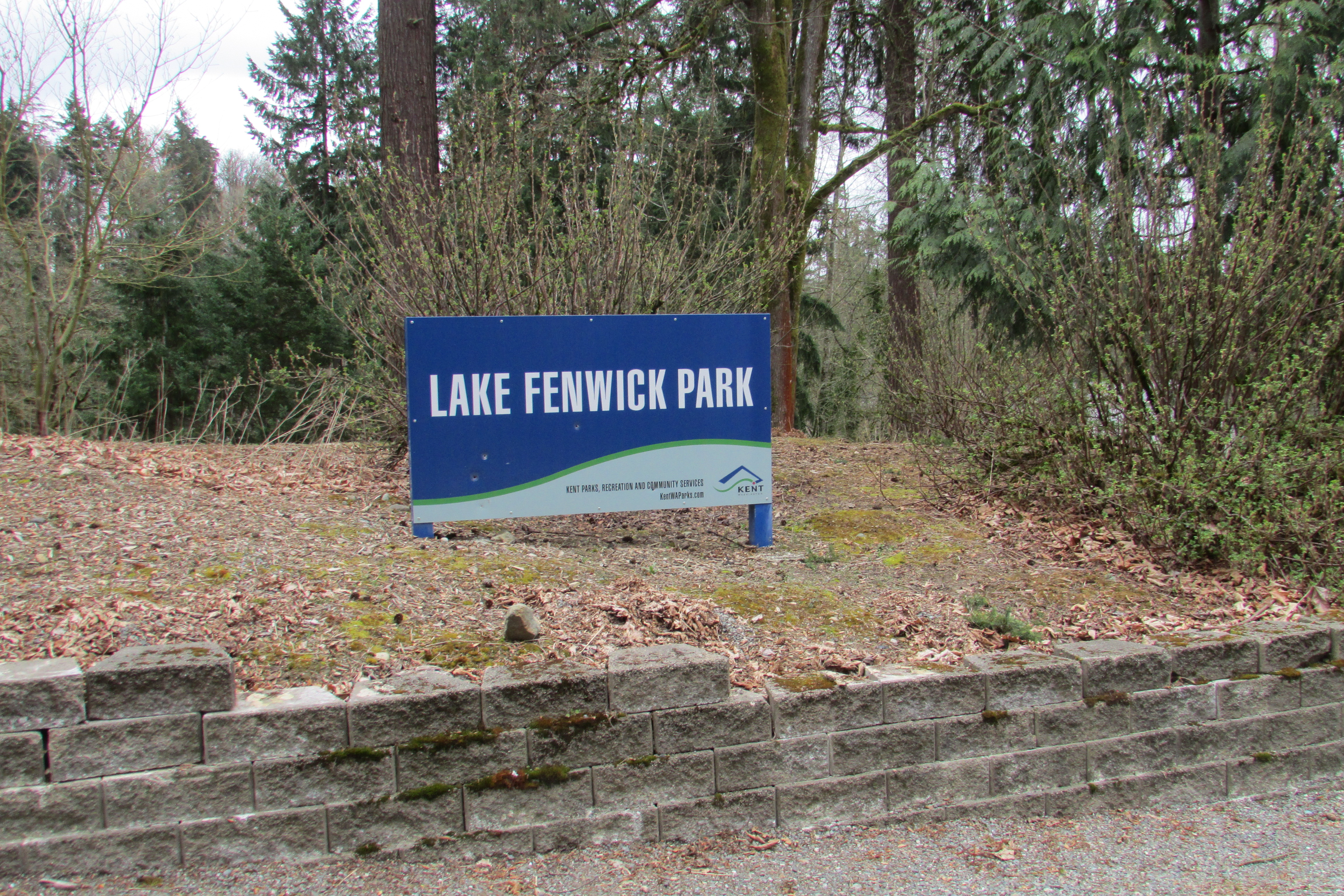
Sign for Lake Fenwick Park

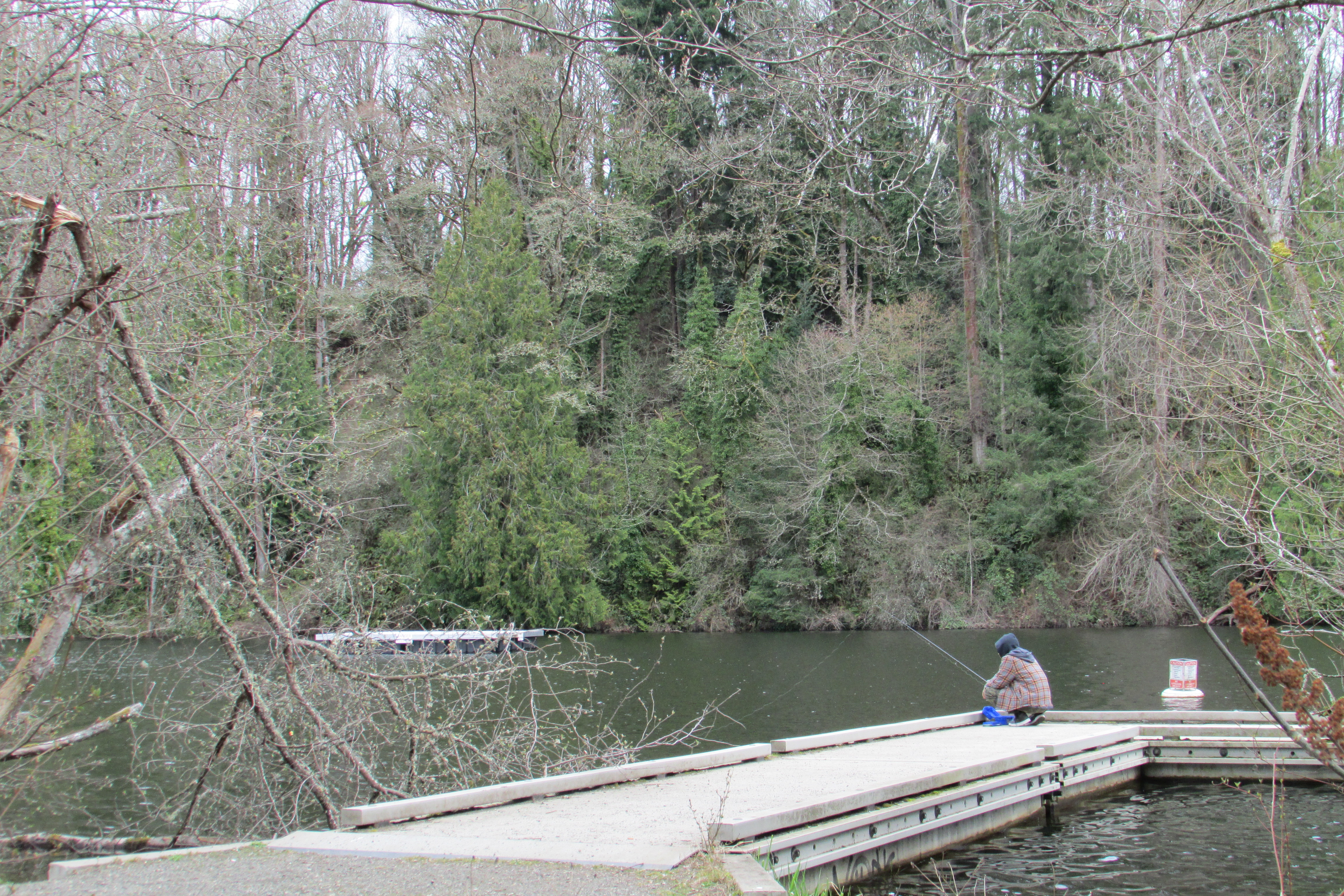
The fishing dock

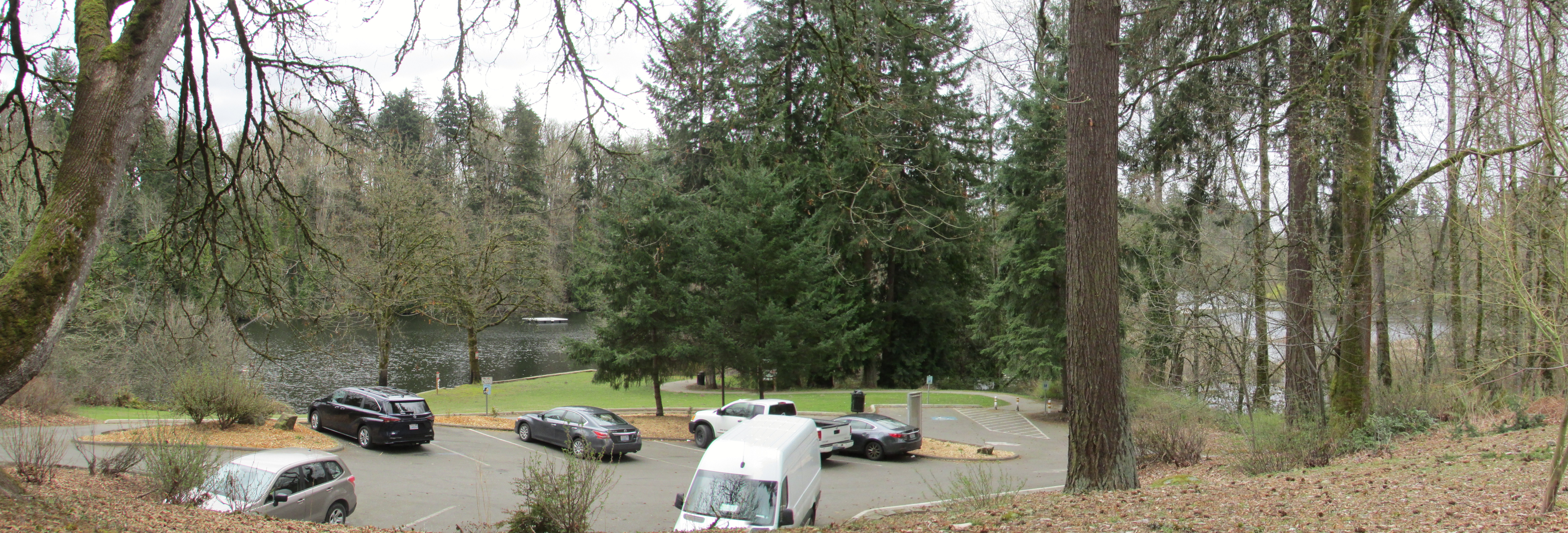
The parking lot at Lake Fenwick Park
