= Clark Lake (Door County, Wisconsin) =

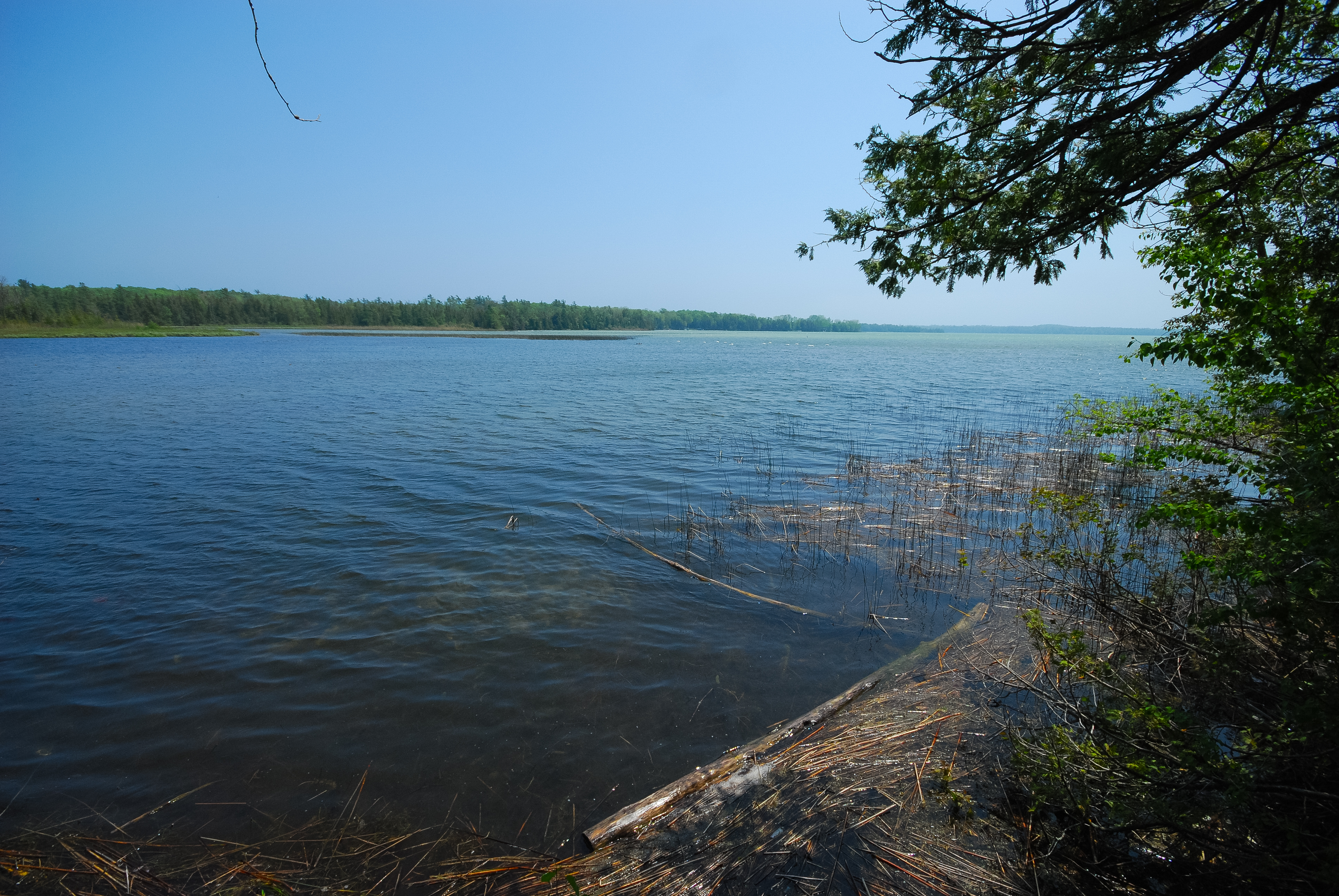

- Location within Wisconsin Location within the United States
- Location: Door County, Wisconsin
- Coordinates: 44.937496°N 87.203991°W
- Type: Drainage Lake
- Basin countries: United States
- Average depth: 7 ft (2.1 m)
- Max. depth: 25 ft (7.6 m)
- Surface elevation: 587 ft (179 m)

Clark Lake is the second largest lake in Door County, Wisconsin. Fish species enzootic to the lake include bluegill, brook trout, largemouth bass, northern pike, smallmouth bass and walleye. The nearest town is Jacksonport. Fish populations have been declining in the lake since 2013 and fishing now is extremely difficult.

On May 16, 2021, the state live-release record for largemouth bass was set at Clark Lake at 22 inches.

== Gallery ==
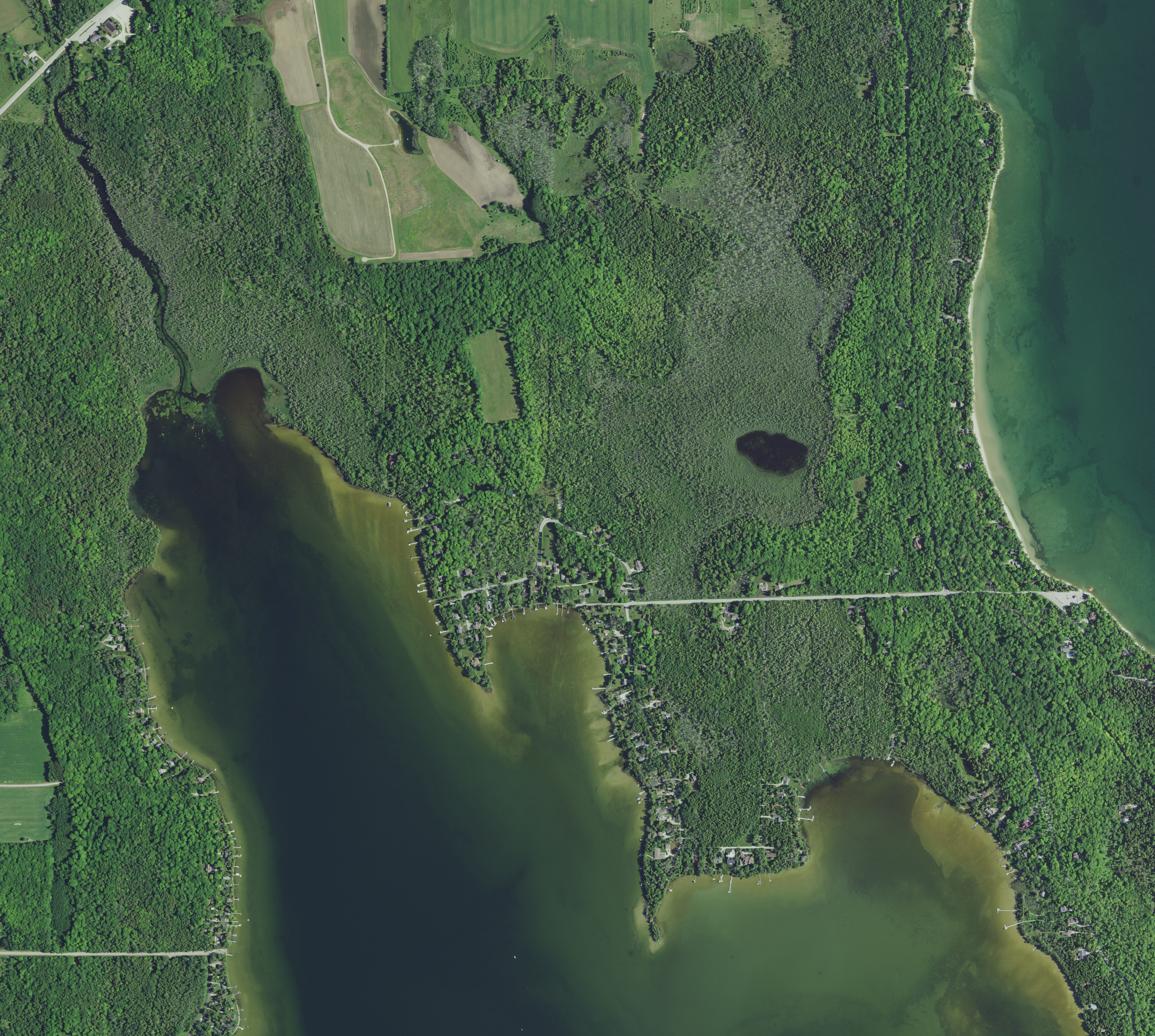
Logan Creek and northern Clark Lake

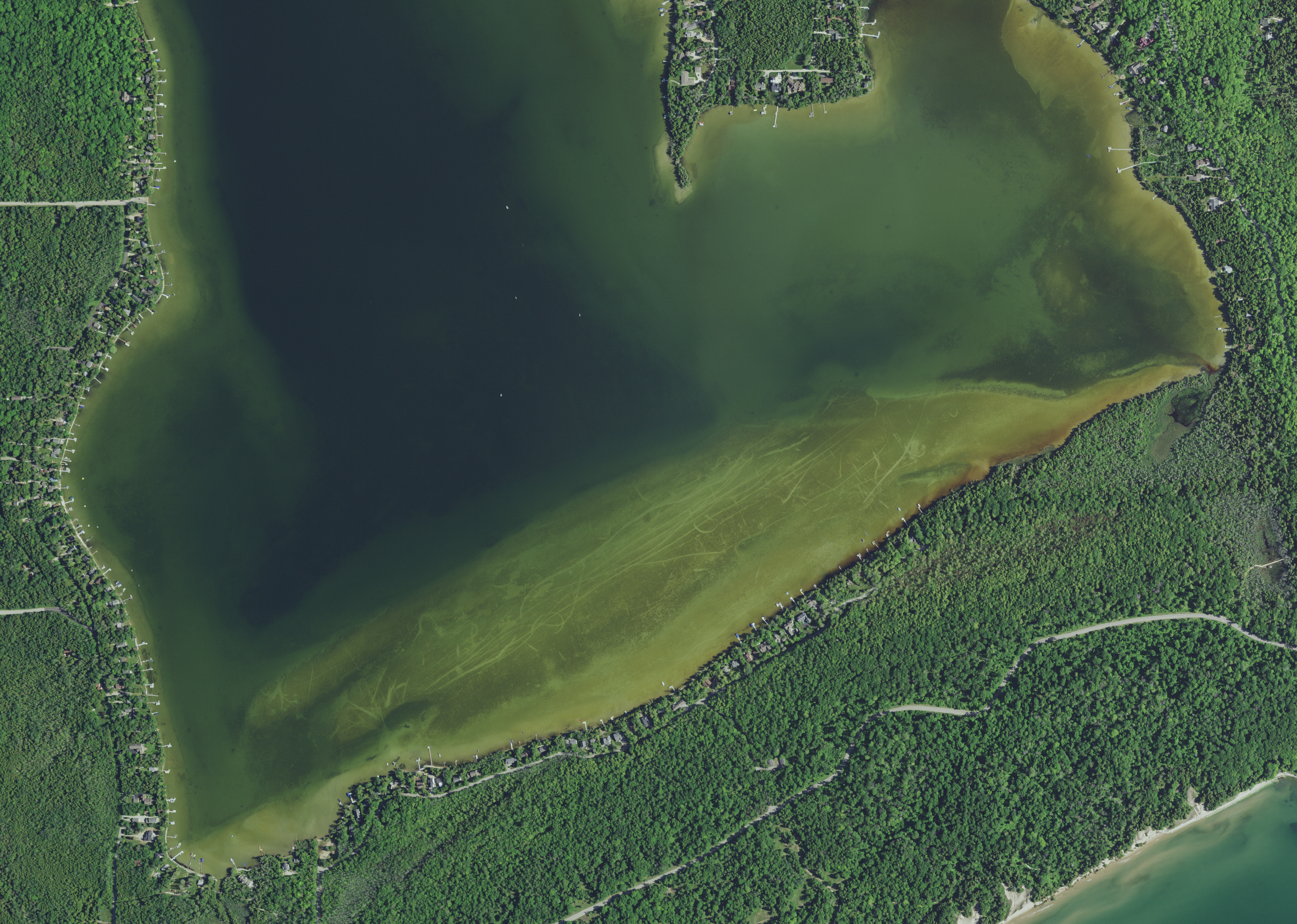
Southern and central Clark Lake

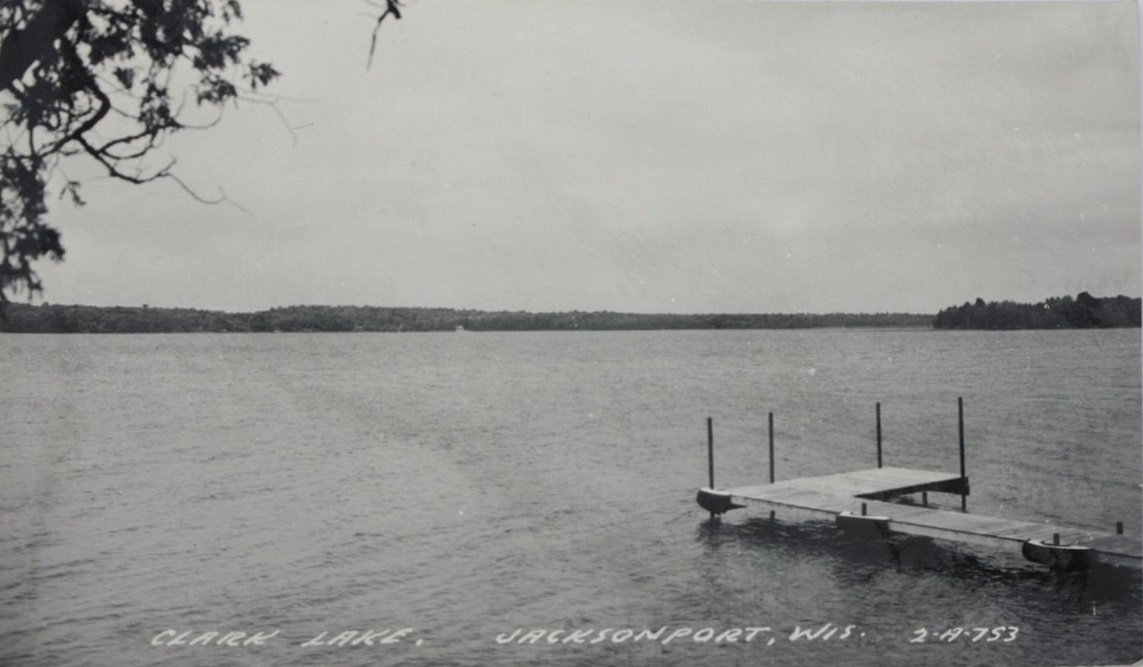
From a postcard postmarked in 1932
