= X10 Wireless Technology =

- Defunct: 2013
- Fate: filed for Chapter 7 bankruptcy in 2013

X10 Wireless Technology, Inc. was an American subsidiary of a Hong Kong-Bermuda company best known for marketing wireless video cameras using controversial pop-under advertisements. Also marketed a remote control system for lamps and appliances that used the home's electrical wiring as the signaling network, using the X10 industry standard protocol. It was founded in 1999 in Kent, Washington.

== History ==
X10 sprang from a small engineering company in Scotland called Pico Electronics, Ltd. in 1974. Pico later fit under the umbrella of X10 Ltd. X10 was a founding member of the Home Automation and Networking Association.

In the latter 1970s, X10 products were introduced in the US through hobbyist catalogue sales. Radio Shack broadened the market to the American public in 1978. Soon after, Sears, Roebuck and other companies joined the market with X10 and other branded products.

In 1989, X10 introduced a self-installed wireless security system, the SS5400.

In 1995, X10 set up ORCA Monitoring Services in Seattle, Washington to handle the monitoring of their security systems.

X10's website went live on the web at x10.com on 26 December 1996, becoming one of the first aggressive internet marketers. In 2001, X10 was receiving more hits than Amazon and eBay, due to its use of pop-under advertising.

Under the One-For-All brand, X10 started manufacturing universal remotes for Universal Electronics, Inc. (UEI) in 1998. The operation grew so large that soon X10 was manufacturing 1 million remotes per month. X10 made remotes for many original equipment manufacturers, including Philips, and is recognised for its infrared (IR) code library. This made X10 one of the largest manufacturers of universal remotes in the world.

On 2 August 2013, X10 filed for Chapter 7 bankruptcy at the U.S. Bankruptcy Court for the Western District of Washington. As of the filing date, total company liabilities were listed as being in the realm of US$1.0M to $10.0M (one to ten million U.S. dollars).
