= Clark Lake (Stevens County, Washington) =

Man-made lake in Washington state, United States

- Location within Washington (state) Location within the United States
- Location: Stevens County, Washington
- Coordinates: 48.2238736°N 118.1367659°W
- Type: Lake
- Surface elevation: 1,903 feet (580 m)

Clark Lake is a lake in the U.S. state of Washington.

Clark Lake was named after James Clarke.

== See also ==
- List of lakes in Washington
