= Kent, Washington =

- City
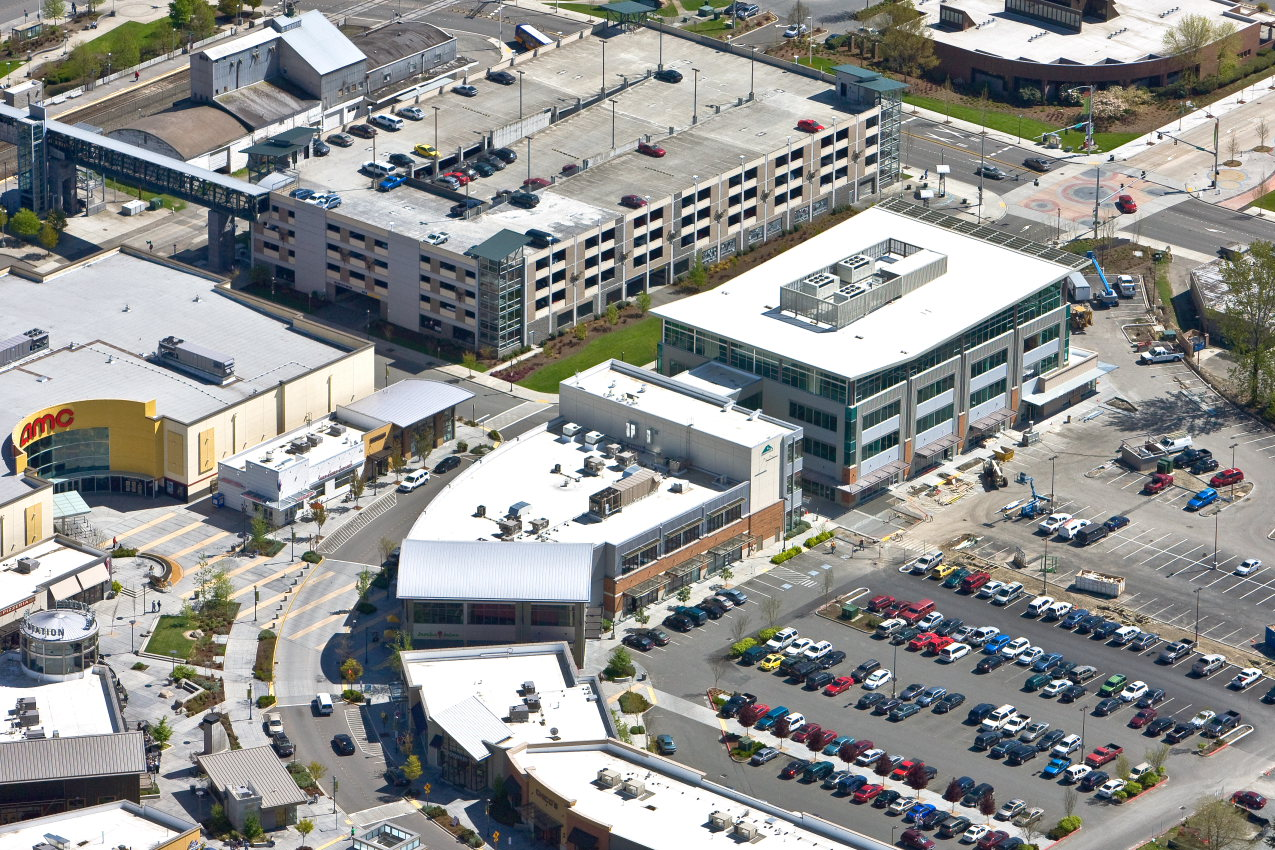
- Kent Station, Kent Regional Library (top right) and Kent Sounder Station in 2009

- Logo
- Interactive map of Kent, Washington
- Location within Washington (state) Location within the United States
- Coordinates: 47.390008°N 122.213528°W
- Country: United States
- State: Washington
- County: King
- Founded: July 3, 1888
- Incorporated: May 28, 1890
- Founder: Ezra Meeker
- Named for: Kent, England

Government
  - Type: Mayor–council
  - Mayor: Dana Ralph
  - Council Member: Satwinder Kaur; Bill Boyce; John Boyd; Brenda Fincher; Marli Larimer; Zandria Michaud; Toni Troutner

Area
  - Total: 34.167 sq mi (88.492 km^{2})
  - Land: 33.584 sq mi (86.982 km^{2})
  - Water: 0.583 sq mi (1.511 km^{2}) 1.71%
- Elevation: 390 ft (120 m)

Population (2020)
  - Total: 136,588
  - Estimate (2025): 134,871
  - Rank: US: 214th WA: 6th
  - Density: 4,037.8/sq mi (1,558.99/km^{2})
- Time zone: UTC−8 (Pacific (PST))
  - Summer (DST): UTC−7 (PDT)
- ZIP Codes: 98030, 98031, 98032, 98035, 98042, 98064, 98089
- Area code: 253
- FIPS code: 53-35415
- GNIS feature ID: 2410185
- Website: kentwa.gov

Kent is a city in King County, Washington, United States. It is part of the Seattle metropolitan area and had a population of 136,588 as of the 2020 census. The population was estimated at 134,871 in 2025, making it the fourth-most populous municipality in greater Seattle and the sixth-most populous in Washington. The city is connected to Seattle, Bellevue, and Tacoma via State Route 167 in addition to Interstate 5, Sounder commuter rail, and commuter buses.

Incorporated in 1890, Kent is the second-oldest incorporated city in the county, after the county seat of Seattle. It is generally divided into three areas: West Hill (mixed residential and commercial along Interstate 5), Valley (primarily industrial and commercial with some medium-density residential; significant parkland along the Green River), and East Hill (primarily residential with retail).

== History ==
The Kent area was first permanently settled by European Americans in the 1850s along the banks of what was then the White River. The first settler was Samuel Russell, who sailed the White and Duwamish Rivers until he claimed a plot of land southeast of modern-day downtown Kent in the spring of 1853. Russell was followed by several other settlers, who quickly staked claims around the area. The settlements were originally known as "White River" and later the town was called "Titusville" after an early settler by the name of James Henry Titus. (There is still a "Titusville Station" sign on Gowe Street near First Avenue.)

In 1861, a post office was established under the name White River and was located at the farm of David and Irena Neely, who settled in modern-day Kent in 1854. In 1855, their farm was attacked by Native Americans when David Neely served as a lieutenant in the territorial army. Another settler was Henry L. Yesler, who was the first sawmill operator in Seattle. By 1870, the population was 277 and all of the quality bottomland had been claimed.

Throughout the 1860s and '70s, grain and forage crops such as wheat, barley, oats, hay, and timothy accounted for much of the annual return of farmers in the valley. During the late 1870s, the town discovered hops production as a major source of income. Due to an aphid invasion, which affected hops crops in Europe, hops from the Puget Sound area began to command high prices. Hops were shipped from Titusville either by the river or rail. In 1889, the town was renamed for the County of Kent, the major hops-producing region in England. Ezra Meeker was asked by the Northern Pacific Railroad to name its station. Meeker suggested that it be known as Kent as it was "Hop Capitol of the West". Hops production in the White River Valley came to an end soon after its own invasion of aphids in 1891. Kent was officially incorporated on May 28, 1890, with a population of 793, the second city incorporated in King County (after Seattle).

After the turn of the 20th century, the area turned to dairy farming and was home to a Carnation condensed milk plant. Flooding from both the Green and the White Rivers was a constant problem. In 1906, flooding changed the course of the White River, which reduced the flood hazard by half. The Green River continued to present problems until the Howard A. Hanson Dam was built at Eagle Gorge in 1962. During and after the Great Depression, Kent was known as the "Lettuce Capital of the World". After World War II, the city began to grow more rapidly. From 1953 to 1960, its size grew 12-fold. In 1965, Boeing began building in Kent, followed a few years later by other aerospace and high-technology companies.

In keeping with the King County Annexation Initiative, which seeks to annex large urban unincorporated areas into city limits or incorporate new cities out of those areas, the Panther Lake area (known officially as the Kent Northeast Potential Annexation Area) was proposed for annexation to the city of Kent. The annexation was voted on by residents of the potential annexation area on November 3, 2009; the area was officially annexed on July 1, 2010. The city grew in area by approximately 5 square miles (13 km^{2}) and 24,000 residents.

== Geography ==
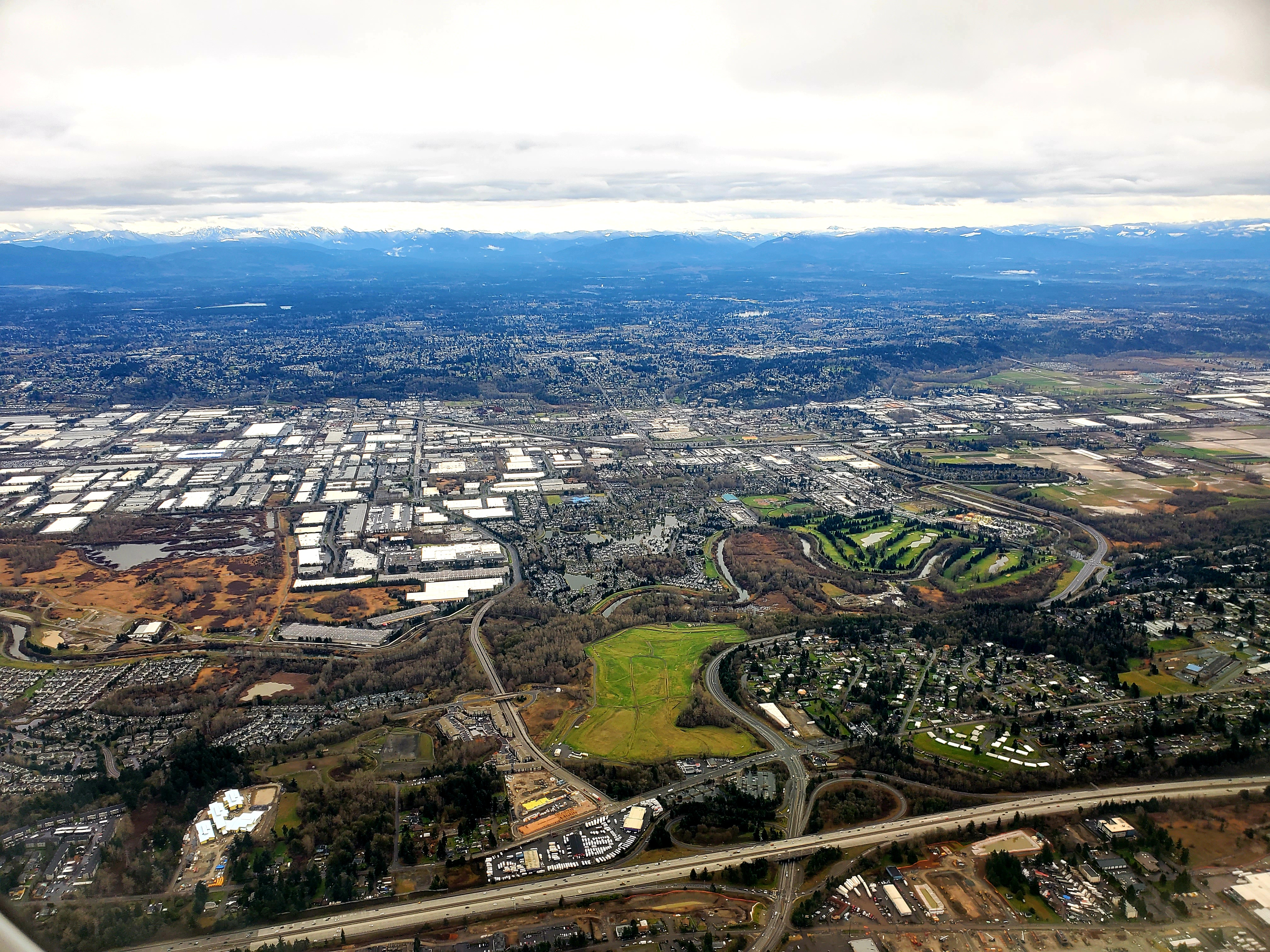
Aerial view of Kent, looking west to east: All three main sections of the city are visible (West Hill, Valley, and East Hill), with downtown Kent near the center of the image.

Kent is located in southern King County and is part of Seattle's metropolitan area. The city is divided into three geographic sections: West Hill, the Kent Valley, and East Hill. Downtown Kent is located on the east side of the valley, about 16 miles from downtown Seattle and downtown Bellevue. Adjoining cities are Renton to the north, Covington to the east, Auburn to the south, Federal Way to the southwest, Des Moines to the west, SeaTac to the northwest, and Tukwila to the north. According to the United States Census Bureau, the city has a total area of 34.167 square miles (88.49 km^{2}), of which 0.583 sq mi (1.51 km^{2}) (1.71%) is covered by water.

Major waterways include the Green River, which flows north through Kent on its way to Puget Sound. The largest lake is Lake Meridian on the city's East Hill. Clark Lake and Lake Fenwick are both surrounded by city parks. Mount Rainier is a prominent geographical landmark to the southeast.

=== Climate ===
Kent has a warm/cool-summer Mediterranean climate (Köppen Csb).

Climate data for Kent, Washington (1991–2020 normals, extremes 1912–present)
Month	Jan	Feb	Mar	Apr	May	Jun	Jul	Aug	Sep	Oct	Nov	Dec	Year
Record high °F (°C)	70 (21)	71 (22)	81 (27)	89 (32)	95 (35)	106 (41)	104 (40)	99 (37)	96 (36)	87 (31)	78 (26)	69 (21)	106 (41)
Mean maximum °F (°C)	57.9 (14.4)	61.0 (16.1)	68.4 (20.2)	75.4 (24.1)	82.1 (27.8)	85.2 (29.6)	90.3 (32.4)	88.8 (31.6)	83.5 (28.6)	73.1 (22.8)	63.0 (17.2)	57.4 (14.1)	93.0 (33.9)
Mean daily maximum °F (°C)	48.4 (9.1)	51.2 (10.7)	55.8 (13.2)	61.4 (16.3)	68.0 (20.0)	71.9 (22.2)	78.3 (25.7)	78.3 (25.7)	72.5 (22.5)	61.3 (16.3)	52.7 (11.5)	47.0 (8.3)	62.2 (16.8)
Daily mean °F (°C)	42.2 (5.7)	43.7 (6.5)	47.4 (8.6)	52.1 (11.2)	58.4 (14.7)	62.6 (17.0)	67.8 (19.9)	67.8 (19.9)	62.5 (16.9)	53.4 (11.9)	45.9 (7.7)	41.2 (5.1)	53.8 (12.1)
Mean daily minimum °F (°C)	36.1 (2.3)	36.2 (2.3)	39.0 (3.9)	42.8 (6.0)	48.7 (9.3)	53.3 (11.8)	57.3 (14.1)	57.3 (14.1)	52.4 (11.3)	45.6 (7.6)	39.1 (3.9)	35.4 (1.9)	45.3 (7.4)
Mean minimum °F (°C)	23.6 (−4.7)	25.2 (−3.8)	29.1 (−1.6)	33.8 (1.0)	40.1 (4.5)	46.7 (8.2)	51.1 (10.6)	50.7 (10.4)	43.4 (6.3)	33.8 (1.0)	25.6 (−3.6)	23.5 (−4.7)	19.4 (−7.0)
Record low °F (°C)	−10 (−23)	−5 (−21)	10 (−12)	23 (−5)	22 (−6)	33 (1)	34 (1)	34 (1)	26 (−3)	19 (−7)	−1 (−18)	0 (−18)	−10 (−23)
Average precipitation inches (mm)	5.77 (147)	3.99 (101)	4.36 (111)	3.06 (78)	2.10 (53)	1.68 (43)	0.67 (17)	0.92 (23)	1.49 (38)	4.07 (103)	6.23 (158)	5.75 (146)	40.09 (1,018)
Average precipitation days (≥ 0.01 in)	19.2	14.7	16.8	14.9	11.6	8.8	3.9	4.4	5.7	12.6	18.3	18.9	149.8
Source: NOAA

== Economy ==
The economy of Kent consists of commuters traveling to the main urban centers of the Seattle metropolitan area (particularly downtown Seattle), extensive manufacturing and warehousing within the city, and retail/personal services catering to residents. The manufacturing and distribution industry in Kent and the surrounding area ranks 4th among markets in the United States.

Kent is a hub for the space industry with the corporate headquarters of Blue Origin and Stoke Space, as well as facilities for Cowboy Space. Other corporate headquarters in Kent include Oberto Sausage Company, Seattle Bicycle Supply, and Omax Corporation. Amazon, Boeing, Whirlpool, and General Electric operate sizable facilities in the city. Due to its central location within the metropolitan area, Kent is home to a large and growing warehouse district. Honoring the 100th anniversary of Oberto Sausage Company's presence there, the city designated a section of South 238th Street as Oberto Drive in May 2018.

=== Boeing ===
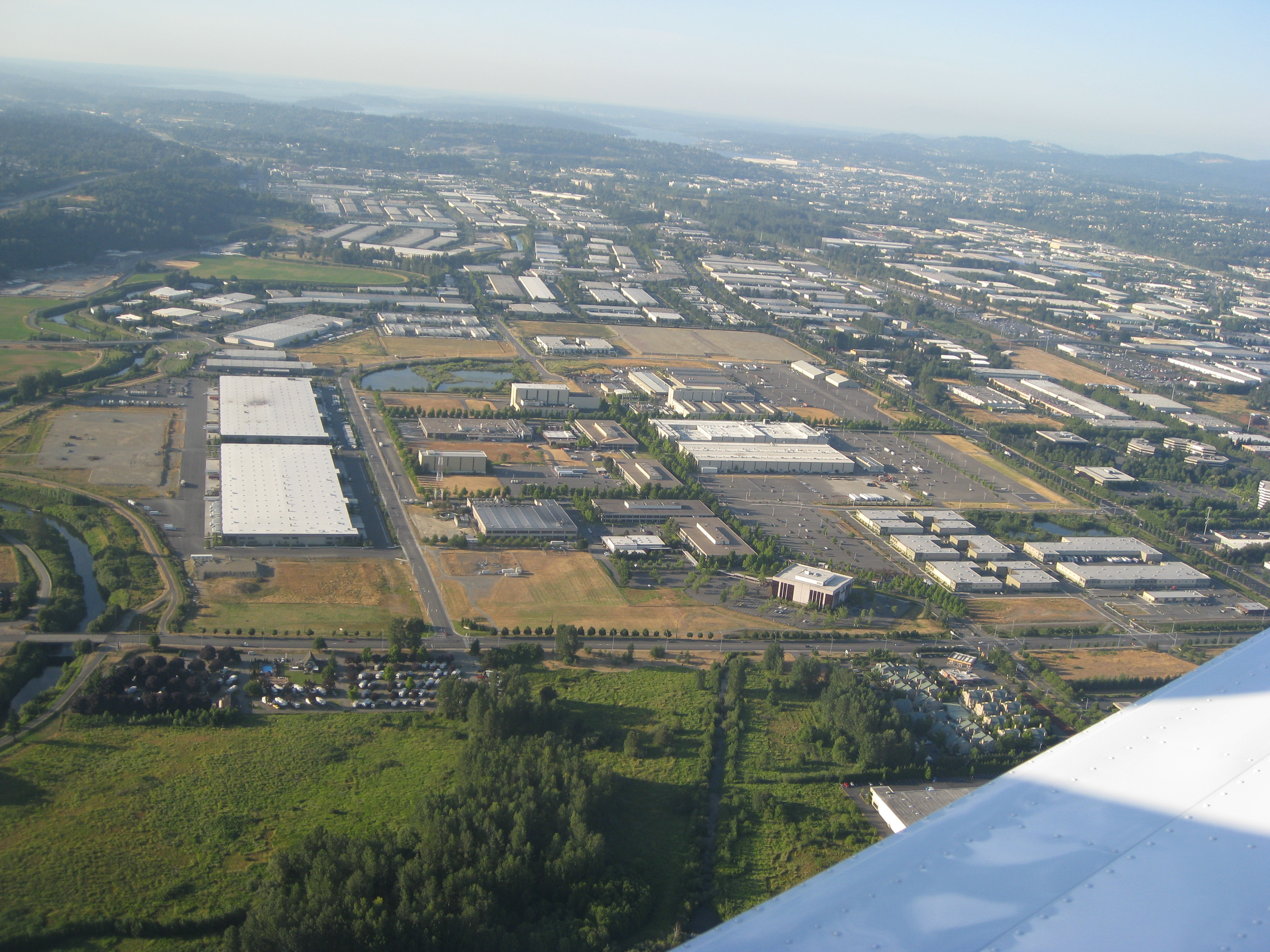
Aerial view of the Kent Space Center

The Boeing Kent Space Center was opened with a public dedication ceremony on October 24, 1964. Keynote speakers at the event were William "Bill" Allen, chairman and CEO of the Boeing Company; future Washington Governor Dan Evans; and Alex Thorton, mayor of the City of Kent. The event featured public tours of the laboratories and facilities used to build the Lunar Roving Vehicles used in the Apollo program.

=== Steel ===
Kent is home to a large steel industry dating back to the early 20th century. Steel and metal manufacturers include:

- Salmon Bay Steel Company operated in Kent for 50 years before closing. Birmingham Steel purchased Salmon Bay in 1991. Salmon Bay went on to buy Bethlehem Steel (Seattle Steel) in West Seattle. Years after the purchase, complaints were made of pollution in the Green River Valley about pollution from the Salmon Bay melting facility, and the facility was shut down.
- Puget Sound Steel is an independently owned and operated-unique specialty fabricator of reinforcing steel and a supplier of related reinforcement products since 1961. It has been the Northwest's select supplier of fabricated rebar and steel reinforcement to commercial, highway, industrial, and residential building contractors. Works include large-scale projects, including bridges and skyscrapers.
- Pacific Metal Company (PMC) in Seattle in 1947 opened a 19,000-square-foot plant. The business and facilities continued to grow for 30 years to meet local needs, as well as the emerging markets of Alaska. Even the expanded 40,000 sq ft warehouse and sales office was deemed insufficient, and in 1979, an 80,000 sq ft facility was built south of the city of Seattle in the Kent Valley at Tukwila. In September 2010, PMC moved to a new location just 3 miles southeast in the city of Kent. PMC is a stocking distributor of nonferrous metals, specializing in stainless steel, copper, aluminum, and brass products, as well as ferrous products specializing in cold=rolled, coated (zinc and aluminum), and painted coils and sheets.
- TMX Aerospace, a division of ThyssenKrupp Steel North America, provides materials including steel, brass, and copper, as well as exclusive supply-chain management support for the Boeing Commercial Airplanes group.

=== Largest employers ===
According to the city's 2021 Annual Comprehensive Financial Report, the largest employers in the city are:

#	Employer	# of Employees
1	Amazon.com LLC	3,073
2	Kent Public Schools	2,970
3	The Boeing Company	2,522
4	Blue Origin, LLC	1,600
5	Exotic Metals Forming Company	1,047
6	Taylor Farms NW	850
7	City of Kent	719
8	King County Maleng Regional Justice Center	630
9	Coho Distributing LLC	628
10	Carlisle Interconnect Industries	615

=== Other companies ===
- Diamondback Bicycles - a major bicycle brand
- Door to Door Storage - self-storage company, introduced portable, containerized storage to the industry
- Fenwick is a pioneer in fiberglass and graphite fishing rods. They were founded in 1952 and named after Fenwick Lake in Kent, Washington. They were bought and moved to Columbia, South Carolina.
- Novara - REI's brand of bicycles and cycling clothing
- Oberto Sausage Company - family-owned, makes beef jerky, pepperoni, and other snack sausages
- Omax Corporation - 2nd largest water jet manufacturer in the U.S.
- Pacific Coast Condensed Milk Company - manufactured and marketed food products including Carnation evaporated milk, with its famous slogan that it is from "Contented Cows"
- Pay 'n Pak - home improvement chain, operated 112 stores on the West Coast
- Powerlight Technologies (formerly LaserMotive) - engineering firm developing technologies for efficiently transmitting power via lasers, a form of wireless energy transfer commonly called "laser power beaming"
- Puget Sound Electric Railway - interurban railway that ran between Tacoma and Seattle
- Puget Systems - custom computer business operating primarily through their website, sells custom and preconfigured computers, including laptops, desktops, and servers
- Raleigh Bicycle Company USA - U.S. headquarters of one of the oldest manufacturers of bicycles, motorcycles, and three-wheel cars
- Redline - manufacturer of BMX, freestyle, cyclocross, mountain, and road bicycles and components
- REI - retail corporation organized as a consumers' co-operative, selling outdoor recreation gear, sporting goods, and clothing
- Seattle–Tacoma Box Company - manufacturer of shipping containers, crates, boxes, and other wooden products
- Stoke Space - private spaceflight company
- Tazo - tea and tisane manufacturer specializing in New Age-style marketing and product labeling
- ThyssenKrupp Aerospace - engineers and manufactures carbon fiber for a variety of Boeing products, including commercial aviation aircraft, military aircraft, and space and communications systems
- Torker - brand of bicycles, unicycles, strollers, and trailers, as well as cycling clothing
- X10 Wireless Technology - manufactures and markets wireless video cameras

== Demographics ==
Historical population
Census	Pop.	Note	%±
1890	853		—
1900	755		−11.5%
1910	1,908		152.7%
1920	2,282		19.6%
1930	2,320		1.7%
1940	2,586		11.5%
1950	3,278		26.8%
1960	9,017		175.1%
1970	17,711		96.4%
1980	22,961		29.6%
1990	37,960		65.3%
2000	79,524		109.5%
2010	92,411		16.2%
2020	136,588		47.8%
2025 (est.)	134,871		−1.3%
U.S. Decennial Census; 2020 Census

As of the 2024 American Community Survey, an estimated 46,607 households were in Kent, with an average of 2.6 persons per household. The city has a median household income of $92,497. About 14.4% of the city's population lives at or below the poverty line. Kent has an estimated 65.3% employment rate, with 30.3% of the population holding a bachelor's degree or higher and 87.8% holding a high-school diploma. The 49,952 housing units had an average density of 1,487.37 per square mile (574.3/km^{2}). The median age in the city was 37.6 years.

=== Racial and ethnic composition ===
Kent, Washington – racial and ethnic composition Note: the US Census treats Hispanic/Latino as an ethnic category. This table excludes Latinos from the racial categories and assigns them to a separate category. Hispanics/Latinos may be of any race.
Race / ethnicity (NH = non-Hispanic)	Pop. 1980	Pop. 1990	Pop. 2000	Pop. 2010	Pop. 2020
White alone (NH)	21,312 (92.82%)	33,002 (86.94%)	53,964 (67.86%)	45,969 (49.74%)	51,132 (37.44%)
Black or African American alone (NH)	314 (1.37%)	1,409 (3.71%)	6,444 (8.10%)	10,088 (10.92%)	17,058 (12.49%)
Native American or Alaska Native alone (NH)	—	464 (1.22%)	682 (0.86%)	677 (0.73%)	673 (0.49%)
Asian alone (NH)	—	1,597 (4.21%)	7,407 (9.31%)	13,841 (14.98%)	32,021 (23.44%)
Pacific Islander alone (NH)	—	—	587 (0.74%)	1,731 (1.87%)	3,534 (2.59%)
Other race alone (NH)	1,004 (4.37%)	26 (0.07%)	406 (0.51%)	235 (0.25%)	805 (0.59%)
Multiracial (NH)	—	—	3,568 (4.49%)	4,484 (4.85%)	8,916 (6.53%)
Hispanic or Latino (any race)	522 (2.27%)	1,462 (3.85%)	6,466 (8.13%)	15,386 (16.65%)	22,449 (16.44%)
Total	22,961 (100.00%)	37,960 (100.00%)	79,524 (100.00%)	92,411 (100.00%)	136,588 (100.00%)

=== 2020 census ===
As of the 2020 census, 136,588 people, 47,058 households, and 31,887 families resided in the city. The population density was 4,047.05 inhabitants per square mile (1,562.6/km^{2}). The 49,157 housing units had an average density of 1,456.50 per square mile (562.4/km^{2}). The median age was 35.5 years, with 23.6% of residents under 18 and 12.2% 65 years or older. For every 100 females, there were 100.1 males, and for every 100 females 18 and over, there were 98.3 males.

Of the 47,058 households, 34.7% had children under 18 living in them, 46.3% were married-couple households, 19.7% were a male householder with no spouse or partner present, and 26.1% were households with a female householder and no spouse or partner present. About 23.8% of all households were made up of individuals, and 8.2% had someone living alone who was 65 or older. Of the housing units, 4.3% were vacant; the homeowner vacancy rate was 0.8% and the rental vacancy rate was 5.3%. All of theresidents lived in urban areas, while none lived in rural areas.

Racial composition as of the 2020 census
Race	Number	Percent
White	54,164	39.7%
Black or African American	17,423	12.8%
American Indian and Alaska Native	1,316	1.0%
Asian	32,240	23.6%
Native Hawaiian and other Pacific Islander	3,591	2.6%
Some other race	13,258	9.7%
Two or more races	14,596	10.7%
Hispanic or Latino (of any race)	22,449	16.4%

=== 2010 census ===
As of the 2010 census, 92,411 people, 34,044 households, and 21,816 families were residing in the city. The population density was 3,228.3 inhabitants per square mile (1,246.5/km^{2}). The 36,424 housing units had an average density of 1,272.2 per square mile (491.2/km^{2}). The racial makeup of the city was 55.55% White, 11.29% African American, 0.99% Native American, 15.16% Asian, 1.92% Pacific Islander, 8.49% from some other races, and 6.61% from two or more races. Hispanic or Latino people of any race were 16.65% of the population.

Of the 34,044 households, 37.0% had children under 18 living with them, 43.6% were married couples living together, 14.3% had a female householder with no husband present, 6.1% had a male householder with no wife present, and 35.9% were not families; 28.1% of all households were made up of individuals, and 7.5% had someone living alone who was 65 or older. The average household size was 2.67, and the average family size was 3.31. The median age in the city was 33 years. About 26.2% of residents were under 18; 10.1% were between 18 and 24; 30.6% were from 25 to 44; 24.3% were from 45 to 64; and 8.8% were 65 or older. The gender makeup of the city was 49.9% male and 50.1% female.

=== 2000 census ===
As of the 2000 census, 79,524 people, 31,113 households, and 19,601 families were living in the city. The population density was 2,836.7 inhabitants per square mile (1,095.3/km^{2}). The 32,488 housing units had an average density of 1,158.9 per square mile (447.5/km^{2}). The racial makeup of the city was 70.81% White, 8.23% African American, 0.98% Native American, 9.42% Asian, 0.76% Pacific Islander, 4.70% from some other race, and 5.37% from two or more races. Hispanic or Latino people of any race were 8.13% of the population.

Of the 32,998 households, 35.5% had children under 18 living with them, 45.1% were married couples living together, 12.8% had a female householder with no husband present, and 37.0% were not families. About 28.5% of all households were made up of individuals, and 5.8% had someone living alone who was 65 or older. The average household size was 2.53, and the average family size was 3.15.

In the city, the age distribution was 27.7% under 18, 10.3% from 18 to 24, 35.0% from 25 to 44, 19.6% from 45 to 64, and 7.3% were 65 or older. The median age was 32 years. For every 100 females, there were 98.4 males. For every 100 females 18 and over, there were 96.2 males. The median income in the city for a household was $50,053 and for a family was $61,016. Males had a median income of $43,136 versus $36,995 for females. The per capita income for the city was $21,390. About 8.7% of families and 11.6% of the population were below the poverty line, including 16.7% of those under 18 and 9.3% of those 65 and older.

== Government ==
Presidential Elections Results
Year	Republican	Democratic	Third Parties
2020	32.32% 18,219	64.50% 36,359	3.18% 1,795

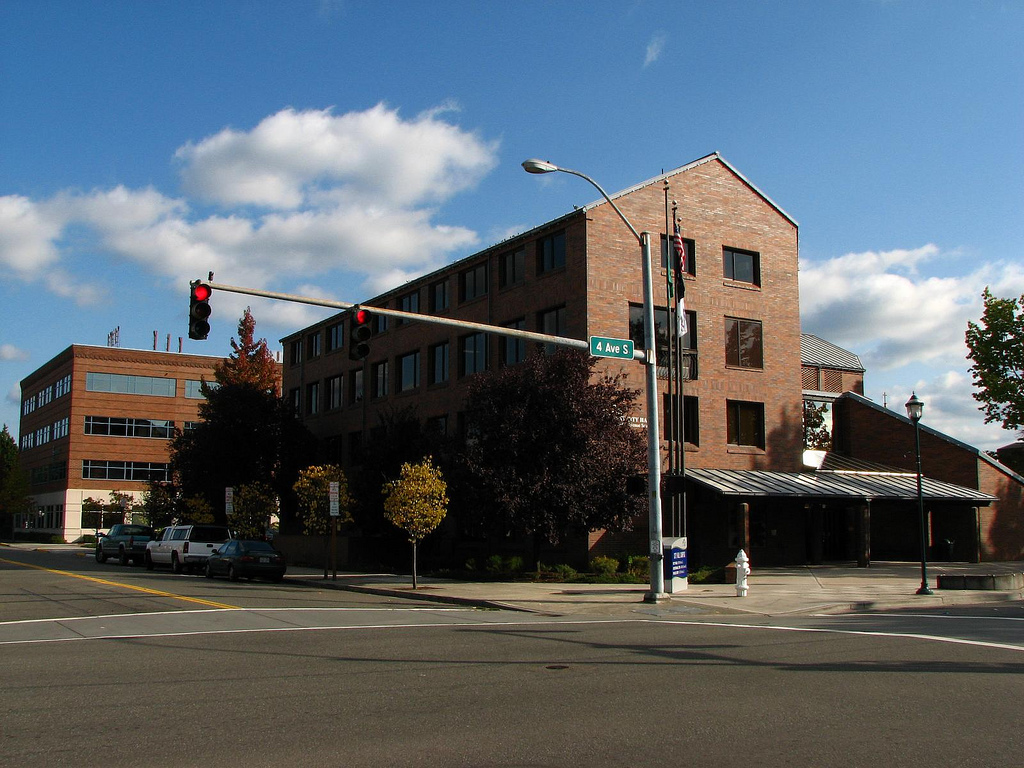
Kent City Hall (right) and the Centennial Center (left), 2008

Maleng Regional Justice Center in Kent

The city is governed by a mayor–council government, with a directly elected mayor and a seven-member city council. Each is elected at-large (that is, by the entire voting population, rather than by districts) to four-year terms. The mayor is Dana Ralph. The city maintains its own municipal police department, unlike some neighboring municipalities who contract police service out to King County.

Regional Animal Services of King County (RASKC, formerly King County Animal Control), an agency of the county government, operates its animal shelter in Kent. The agency renovated a dairy barn into being an animal shelter in 1974. In 2025 the county purchased a facility in Kent which would be the replacement shelter, scheduled to open in 2027. The facility consists of office space and warehouse space.

=== Fire protection ===
The city is served by the Puget Sound Regional Fire Authority, with seven of the department's 13 stations located within municipal boundaries.

== Culture ==
ShoWare Center, home of the Seattle Thunderbirds

In 1992, the Greater Kent Historical Society was formed to promote the discovery, preservation, and dissemination of knowledge about the history of the greater Kent area. In 1996, the City of Kent purchased the historic Bereiter house, the home of one of Kent's early mayors, for use as the Kent Historical Museum, which is operated by the Greater Kent Historical Society.

=== City landmarks ===
Kent has designated these landmarks:

Name	Constructed	Designated
Lunar Roving Vehicles	1970	2019
Emil W. Bereiter House	1907	2008
Mill Creek Canyon Earthworks	1982	2008
Saar Pioneer Cemetery	1873	2010

=== Events ===
- Canterbury Faire was an arts festival held in mid-August every year at Mill Creek Canyon Earthworks park, which stopped in 2006.
- Kent Cornucopia Days in July
- Kent Farmers Market
- Kent Saturday Market

=== Sports and entertainment ===
In 2003, Kent was named Sports Illustrated's Sportstown of the year for Washington. In January 2006, a shopping and entertainment center, known as Kent Station, opened in downtown Kent adjacent to the transit station of the same name.

The accesso ShoWare Center is a 6,500-seat indoor arena that hosts two minor-league sports teams: the Seattle Thunderbirds play ice hockey in the U.S. Division of the Western Hockey League, and the Tacoma Stars play indoor soccer in the Major Arena Soccer League. The Seattle Kraken of the National Hockey League played a preseason game at the arena on October 2, 2021, losing to the Calgary Flames in front of a sellout crowd. The arena hosted the 2012 Skate America figure skating competition, which drew a total of 13,172 spectators over its three-day run, and the 2015 Junior Roller Derby World Cup.

== Parks and recreation ==
Kent's park system includes 55 parks, miniparks, playfields, skateparks, greenbelts, and other related facilities. The parks range in size from as small as 4,300 square feet (400 m^{2}) to over 310 acres (1.3 km^{2}). Riverbend Golf Complex, featuring an 18-hole course which is one of the busiest in Washington, is located in Kent. An adjacent par-3 course was actively used by locals for years before being shut down in 2017 to make room for a mixed-used development.

== Education ==
Public primary and secondary education in the vast majority of Kent and a number of neighboring cities and unincorporated areas is provided by the Kent School District, which includes four high schools, seven middle schools, 28 elementary schools, and two academies. The Kent School District has an individualized graduation and degree program named iGrad, which is aimed at helping dropouts aged 16–21 who are willing to get back to school.

Federal Way Public Schools, which includes a portion of Kent, has several schools within the city limits. Residents of far east Kent are zoned in the Tahoma School District. Other portions are in the Highline Public Schools and the Renton School District. A branch of Green River Community College opened in Kent Station in 2007; it is now called Green River College.

== Infrastructure ==
=== Transportation ===
The main north–south highway serving Kent is State Route 167, a freeway that connects the city to Renton and Puyallup. The city includes portions of Interstate 5 to the west and State Route 18 to the east; both are major freeways that provide inter-regional connections. State Route 516 travels east–west across Kent and connects all three freeways, while State Route 181 and State Route 515 provide further north–south connections as city streets. The older portions of the city, primarily in downtown and the valley floor, are laid out with a continuous grid of arterial streets.

The city is served by two public transit providers: King County Metro and Sound Transit. The main hub is Kent Station, a Sounder commuter rail station with service to downtown Seattle, Tacoma Dome Station, and bus connections. Sound Transit operates Sounder service primarily during peak hours on weekdays and has three Sound Transit Express bus routes connecting to Bellevue, Redmond, and Seattle–Tacoma International Airport. King County Metro operates local and regional service from Kent Station and other hubs, including park and ride facilities. Metro's RapidRide bus rapid transit system includes the A Line, which runs on State Route 99 in western Kent; the I Line, scheduled to open in 2027, will connect downtown Kent to Renton and Auburn. The Link light rail system is planned to be extended to Federal Way, Washington in late 2025, with intermediate stops at the Kent Des Moines station near Highline College and the Star Lake station at South 272nd Street.

Heavy rail service includes two major north–south lines through the Kent Valley, with freight traffic operations by the BNSF and Union Pacific railroads.

== Notable people ==
- Ely Allen, soccer player
- Earl Anthony, professional bowler
- Kelly Bachand, contestant of History Channel's Top Shot Season 1, grew up in Kent
- Red Badgro, NFL and MLB player, inductee Pro Football Hall of Fame
- John Bastyr, influential advocate of naturopathic medicine, namesake of Bastyr University
- Joseph and Melissa Batten, Microsoft software developers in 2008 murder case
- Karl Best, former MLB relief pitcher for Seattle Mariners and Minnesota Twins
- Josie Bissett, actress, Melrose Place
- Betty Bowen, journalist and art promoter
- Demitrius Bronson, NFL running back
- John Bronson, NFL tight end for the Arizona Cardinals
- Conner Cappelletti, soccer player and coach who represented Guam
- Ernie Conwell, NFL tight end, St Louis Rams and New Orleans Saints
- Suzette Cooke, former mayor of Kent, Washington
- Rebecca Corry, comedian/actress
- Billy Crook, Major League Soccer (MLS) defender
- Daphne Loves Derby, indie-pop rock band
- Michael Dickerson, professional basketball player, Houston Rockets and Vancouver/Memphis Grizzlies
- Jeff Dye, comedian and actor, was born in Kent and grew up there
- Robin Earl, NFL player with the Chicago Bears, USFL player
- Jason Ellis, professional basketball player in the Netherlands and Switzerland
- Kai Ellis, CFL player
- The Fung Brothers, comedians, rappers; grew up in Kent
- Melissa Goad, actress and model
- Abdulameer Yousef Habeeb, Iraqi artist and calligrapher, lived in the U.S. as refugee
- Matt Hague, first baseman for the Toronto Blue Jays of MLB
- Benjamin Haggerty, rapper Macklemore
- Marcus Hahnemann, professional soccer goalkeeper
- Al Hairston, professional basketball player for Seattle SuperSonics, head coach for Bowling Green University
- Peter Hallock, composer and organist
- Tess Henley, singer-songwriter and pianist
- Shannon Higgins-Cirovski, soccer player in Hall of Fame
- Jeff Jaeger, NFL kicker
- Billy Jones, college baseball player, coach of Appalachian State Mountaineers
- Reggie Jones, NFL]cornerback
- Nicole Joraanstad, curler, 2009 Olympic gold medalist
- Mike Karney, college and professional football player
- Stefano Langone, American Idol contestant
- Danny Lorenz, professional hockey player for New York Islanders
- Ellen MacGregor, author
- William M. Marutani, judge
- Kenny Mayne, ESPN analyst
- Victor Aloysius "Vic" Meyers, jazz bandleader and Democratic politician, "Clown Prince of Politics"
- PZ Myers, biology professor at University of Minnesota Morris and intelligent design critic
- Bob Nelson, screenwriter and Almost Live! cast member, Academy Award nominee for Nebraska
- Danny Pierce, painter, printmaker, and sculptor
- Mark Prothero, attorney, defense co-counsel for Green River Killer
- Brenda Raganot, professional bodybuilder
- Simon Peter Randolph, pioneer steamboat captain
- Dave Reichert, U.S. Representative, Republican Party
- Gary Ridgway, "Green River Killer" (former resident)
- Mike Roberg, NFL tight end
- Jerry "The King" Ruth, professional drag racer
- Peter Schweizer, journalist
- Joshua Smith, Georgetown and UCLA basketball player
- Rick Sortun, NFL player, St. Louis Cardinals
- Usaia Sotutu, runner who represented Fiji at 1972 Summer Olympics
- Rodney Stuckey, basketball player, Detroit Pistons and Indiana Pacers
- Alameda Ta'amu, NFL player for Kansas City Chiefs
- Harvey Thomas, luthier, built distinctive guitars in 1960s
- Courtney Thompson, UW and US national team volleyball player, set NCAA assist record
- Mason Tobin, MLB pitcher, Texas Rangers
- Kyle Townsend, record producer, composer, and musician
- Toussaint Tyler, NFL running back, New Orleans Saints
- Brian Tyms, NFL wide receiver, New England Patriots
- Courtney Vandersloot, basketball player and 2021 WNBA Finals Champion for Chicago Sky
- Dave Wainhouse, MLB pitcher
- Cam Weaver, professional soccer player, Seattle Sounders FC
- Olivia Van der Jagt, professional soccer player, Seattle Reign FC

== Sister cities ==
Kent has the following sister cities:

- Sunnfjord, Norway
- Tamba, Hyōgo Prefecture, Japan
- Yangzhou, Jiangsu, China
- Gangdong District, Seoul, South Korea
- Lutsk, Ukraine.

Historical sister city relationships:

- Castlereagh, Northern Ireland, United Kingdom
- Kaibara, Hyōgo Prefecture, Japan
- Kherson, Ukraine.

== See also ==
- List of companies based in Kent, Washington
