= Clark Lake Park =

Lake in Kent, Washington, U.S.

Clark Lake
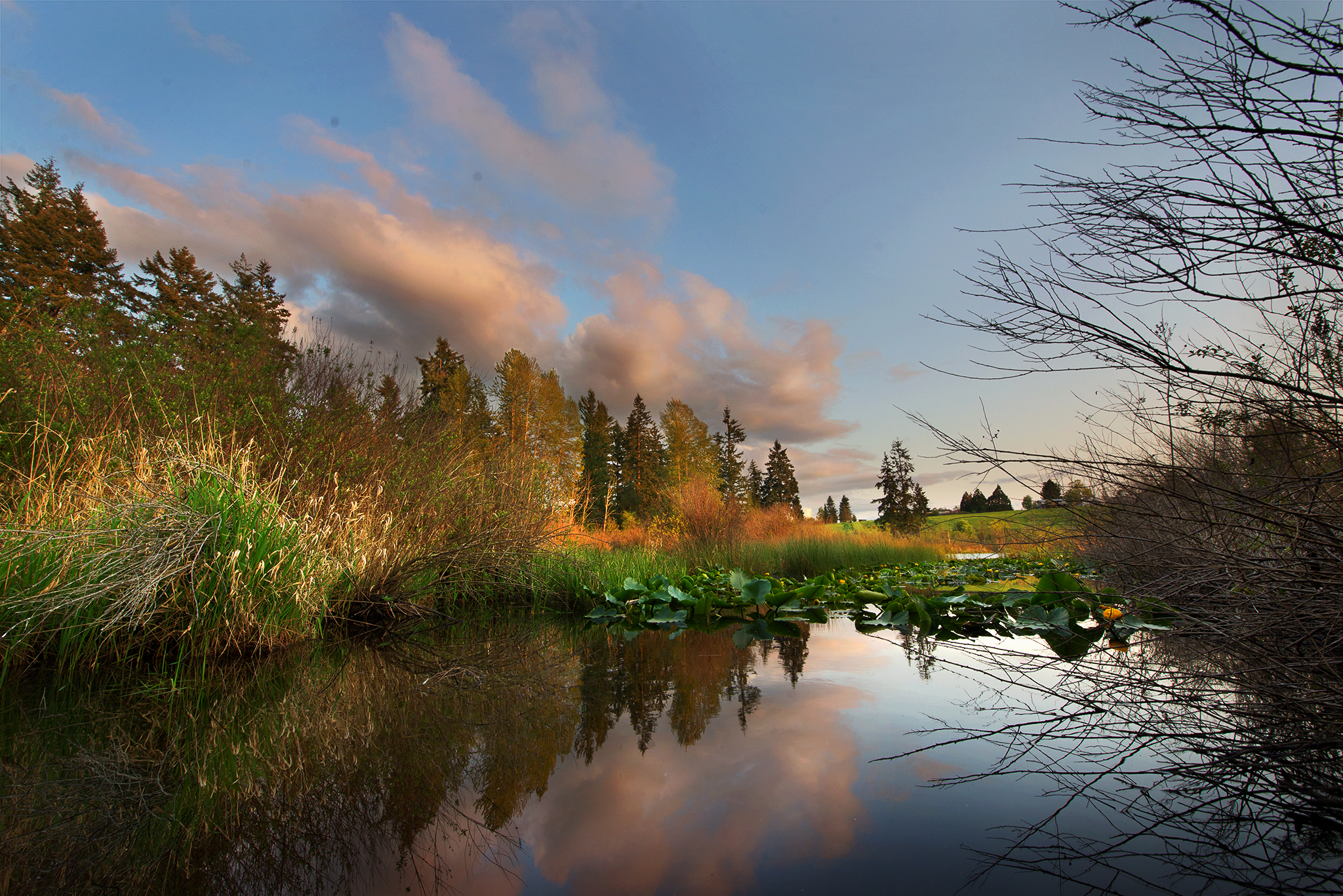
- Sunset at Clark Lake

- Location within Washington (state) Location within the United States
- Location: Kent, Washington, United States
- Coordinates: 47°23′00″N 122°10′30″W
- Basin countries: United States
- Surface area: 8 acres (3.2 ha)
- Max. depth: 45 ft (14 m)

Clark Lake Park is a 150-acre (61 ha) park in Kent, Washington, United States, with the eponymous Clark Lake, 8-acre (3.2 ha) in size, the main highlight of the park.

== Description ==
Clark Lake is surrounded by a 150-acre (61 ha) park. The park's major feature is a loop trail, which partially encircles the lake. The trail will be completed once the Ruth property is integrated into the park. The park is rural and forested, which contrasts with the denser development surrounding it. Activities include fishing from a dock on the lake, wildlife viewing, BMX biking, and hiking/walking. Clark Lake has a 338-acre (137 ha) watershed, which includes most of the park as well as areas northwest of the lake. Measurements of its water quality were only taken in 2003 and 2004, but both measurements indicated that the lake was borderline eutrophic. Overall, the water quality was classified as fair or good.

The final 17 acres (6.9 ha) of land, known as the Ruth Property, were acquired by Kent City Council in 2022 for $7.2 million. Acquiring this property was a long-term goal for the city, since at least 1971. King County provided over $2 million in funding to help acquire this land, as part of a $52 million open space preservation initiative. The Ruth property was the last private property surrounding the lake. Its purchase will allow the city to complete the loop trail around the lake. City and county officials hope that completing the loop trail will help increase the popularity of the park. In addition, the city wished to control the entire shoreline of the lake to better protect water quality and wildlife habitat. If the property remained privately owned, development of the parcel could threaten the lake and the integrity of the park.
