= Door to Door Storage =

Self-storage company in Kent, Washington

- Type: Private
- Industry: self-storage; transport
- Founded: Kent, Washington, United States (May 1996)
- Founder: Tim Riley
- Website: doortodoor.com

Door To Door Storage was a self-storage company which provided a self-storage box service for customers to fill at their premises. It was acquired in May 2017 by U-Haul. The company delivers the storage boxes which customers load and then ships the boxes to their storage facilities.

== History ==
Door To Door Storage was founded in Kent, Washington, in May 1996 by Tim Riley, a first-time entrepreneur who had previously worked for Shurgard Storage Centers. The company has locations in metropolitan areas all across the U.S., from Washington to Florida and California to New Hampshire.

== Dimensions ==
The containers are 7 feet (2.1 m) tall and measure 5 by 8 feet (1.5 m × 2.4 m). Each will typically accommodate one to one-and-one-half rooms of household goods. They stand about 4 inches (100 mm) above the ground and are made of pressure-treated 3/4" plywood with a weather-resistant cover.

== See also ==
- Extra Space Storage
